= Second government of María Chivite =

2nd government of María Chivite
- Government of Navarre
- 2023–present
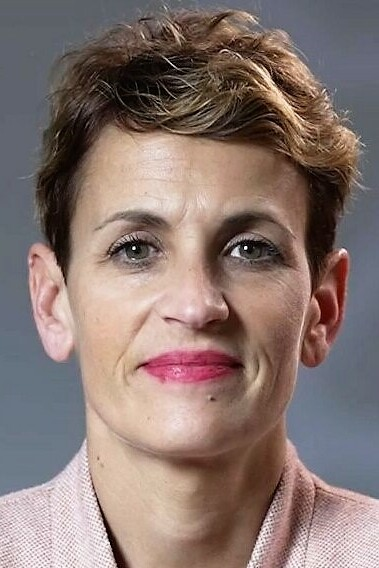
- María Chivite in March 2023.
- Date formed: 18 August 2023

People and organisations
- Monarch: Felipe VI
- President: María Chivite
- Vice Presidents: Ana Ollo ^{(2nd)} Begoña Alfaro ^{(3rd)} Javier Remírez ^{(1st)} (2026–present); Félix Taberna ^{(1st)} (2023–2026)
- No. of ministers: 13 (Note: Does not include the President.)
- Total no. of members: 17
- Member party: PSN–PSOE; GBai; Contigo/Zurekin
- Status in legislature: Minority (coalition)
- Opposition party: UPN
- Opposition leader: Javier Esparza

History
- Election: 2023 regional election
- Legislature term: 11th Parliament
- Budget: 2024, 2025, 2026
- Predecessor: Chivite I

The second government of María Chivite was formed on 18 August 2023, following the latter's election as president of the Government of Navarre by the Parliament of Navarre on 15 August and her swearing-in on 17 August, as a result of the Socialist Party of Navarre (PSN–PSOE) being able to muster a majority of seats in the Parliament together with Geroa Bai (GBai) and Contigo Navarra (Contigo/Zurekin), with external support from EH Bildu, following the 2023 Navarrese regional election. It succeeded the first Chivite government and is the incumbent Government of Navarre since 18 August 2023, a total of 1,061 days.

The cabinet comprises members of the PSN–PSOE, GBai—with the involvement of the Basque Nationalist Party (EAJ/PNV) and Future Social Greens (GSB/GSV)—and Contigo/Zurekin (represented in the cabinet by Podemos), as well as a number of independents proposed by the first two parties.

== Investiture ==
Investiture; María Chivite (PSN)
Ballot →	14 August 2023	15 August 2023
Required majority →	26 out of 50	Simple
Yes: • PSN (11); • GBai (7); • Contigo/Zurekin (3)	21 / 50	21 / 50
No: • UPN (15); • PP (3); • Vox (2)	20 / 50	20 / 50
Abstentions: • EH Bildu (9)	9 / 50	9 / 50
Absentees	0 / 50	0 / 50

== Cabinet changes ==
Chivite's first government saw a number of cabinet changes during its tenure:

- On 16 August 2023, José Luis Arasti was proposed as Economy and Finance minister in the new Chivite's cabinet, but his swearing-in had to wait until he could step down from his post as Government Delegate in Navarre. In the meantime, Juan Cruz Cigudosa was temporarily entrusted with the office's portfolio until Arasti could take office on 30 August.
- On 3 October 2023, the duties of government's spokesperson—which had been temporarily entrusted to the first vice president, Félix Taberna—were assigned to Interior, Civil Service and Justice minister, Amparo López, on a permanent basis.
- On 1 December 2023, Cigudosa was announced for the post of Secretary of State in the Ministry of Science, Innovation and Universities of the newly-formed Sánchez III Government, resulting in him stepping down as University, Innovation and Digital Transformation minister on 5 December. Patricia Fanlo was announced as Cigudosa's successor, taking office on 11 December.
- On 4 April 2024, Amparo López temporarily resigned her post as regional minister for Interior, Civil Service and Justice in order to take up a vacant technical position at the Valle de Egüés City Council after participating in a merit-based competition, with the latter post being incompatible with her regional minister responsibilities. Vice President Taberna was temporarily entrusted with the office's portfolio until López's resumed her post.
- On 22 January 2025, Fanlo resigned as University, Innovation and Digital Transformation minister for "professional reasons", being replaced in the post by the director-manager of the Navarre Centre for Self-Learning of Languages (CNAI), Juan Luis García, who took office on 28 January. Vice President Taberna was temporarily entrusted with the office's portfolio until García was sworn in.
- On 8 January 2026, President Chivite announced her largest cabinet reshuffle since 2019 by replacing his first vice president and presidency minister, Félix Taberna, and interior minister and spokesperson, Amparo López, by Javier Remírez and Inma Jurío, respectively; Remírez also assumed the post of government's spokesperson. Chivite justified the reshuffle in the need to "give new impetus" to her government, amid an ongoing scandal related to the Koldo case and former PSN organization secretary and Chivite's key ally Santos Cerdán, but was attributed by the media to disagreements between Taberna and the president on the management of the ongoing scandals and Chivite's wish to surround herself with party allies.

== Council of Government ==
The Council of Government is structured into the offices for the president, the three vice presidents and 13 ministries.

← Chivite II Government → (18 August 2023 – present)
Portfolio	Name	Party	Took office	Left office	Ref.
President	María Chivite	PSN–PSOE	17 August 2023	Incumbent	
First Vice President; Minister of the Presidency and Equality	Félix Taberna	PSN–PSOE	18 August 2023	9 January 2026	
Second Vice President; Minister of Memory and Coexistence, Foreign Action and Basque Language	Ana Ollo	GBai (GSV)	18 August 2023	Incumbent	
Third Vice President; Minister of Housing, Youth and Migration Policies	Begoña Alfaro	Contigo (Podemos)	18 August 2023	Incumbent	
Minister of Economy and Finance	Juan Cruz Cigudosa was temporarily entrusted with the office's portfolio from 18 to 30 August 2023.				
Minister of Education	Carlos Gimeno	PSN–PSOE	18 August 2023	Incumbent	
Minister of Health	Fernando Domínguez	Independent	18 August 2023	Incumbent	
Minister of Territorial Cohesion	Óscar Chivite	PSN–PSOE	18 August 2023	Incumbent	
Minister of Industry and Ecological and Digital Business Transition	Mikel Irujo	GBai (PNV)	18 August 2023	Incumbent	
Minister of Social Rights, Social Economy and Employment	Mari Carmen Maeztu	PSN–PSOE	18 August 2023	Incumbent	
Minister of University, Innovation and Digital Transformation	Juan Cruz Cigudosa	PSN–PSOE	18 August 2023	5 December 2023	
Minister of Interior, Civil Service and Justice	Amparo López	PSN–PSOE	18 August 2023	3 October 2023	
Minister of Rural Development and Environment	José María Aierdi	GBai (GSV)	18 August 2023	Incumbent	
Minister of Culture, Sports and Tourism	Rebeca Esnaola	Independent	18 August 2023	Incumbent	
Spokesperson of the Government	Félix Taberna was temporarily entrusted with the office's portfolio from 18 August to 3 October 2023.				
=== Changes August 2023 ===
Portfolio	Name	Party	Took office	Left office	Ref.
Minister of Economy and Finance	José Luis Arasti	PSN–PSOE	30 August 2023	Incumbent	
=== Changes October 2023 ===
Portfolio	Name	Party	Took office	Left office	Ref.
Minister of Interior, Civil Service and Justice; Spokesperson of the Government	Amparo López	PSN–PSOE	3 October 2023	4 April 2024	
=== Changes 6 December 2023 ===
Portfolio	Name	Party	Took office	Left office	Ref.
Minister of University, Innovation and Digital Transformation	Félix Taberna was temporarily entrusted with the office's portfolio from 6 to 11 December 2023.				
=== Changes 11 December 2023 ===
Portfolio	Name	Party	Took office	Left office	Ref.
Minister of University, Innovation and Digital Transformation	Patricia Fanlo	PSN–PSOE	11 December 2023	22 January 2025	
=== Changes October 2023 ===
Portfolio	Name	Party	Took office	Left office	Ref.
Minister of Interior, Civil Service and Justice; Spokesperson of the Government	Félix Taberna was temporarily entrusted with the offices' portfolios from 4 to 8 April 2024.				
=== Changes 8 April 2024 ===
Portfolio	Name	Party	Took office	Left office	Ref.
Minister of Interior, Civil Service and Justice; Spokesperson of the Government	Amparo López	PSN–PSOE	8 April 2024	9 January 2026	
=== Changes 22 January 2025 ===
Portfolio	Name	Party	Took office	Left office	Ref.
Minister of University, Innovation and Digital Transformation	Félix Taberna was temporarily entrusted with the office's portfolio from 22 to 28 January 2025.				
=== Changes 28 January 2025 ===
Portfolio	Name	Party	Took office	Left office	Ref.
Minister of University, Innovation and Digital Transformation	Juan Luis García	PSN–PSOE	28 January 2025	Incumbent	
=== Changes January 2026 ===
Portfolio	Name	Party	Took office	Left office	Ref.
First Vice President; Minister of the Presidency and Equality; Spokesperson of the Government	Javier Remírez	PSN–PSOE	9 January 2026	Incumbent	
Minister of Interior, Civil Service and Justice	Inma Jurío	PSN–PSOE	9 January 2026	Incumbent	

== Departmental structure ==
María Chivite's government is organised into several superior and governing units, whose number, powers and hierarchical structure may vary depending on the ministerial department.

Unit/body rank

- (■) Director-general
- (■) Service / Subdirectorate
- (●) Autonomous agency

Office (Original name)	Portrait	Name	Took office	Left office	Alliance/party	Ref.
=== Presidency ===
Presidency (Presidencia del Gobierno)		María Chivite	17 August 2023	Incumbent	PSN–PSOE	
First Vice Presidency (Vicepresidencia Primera del Gobierno)		Félix Taberna	18 August 2023	9 January 2026	PSN–PSOE	
First Vice Presidency (Vicepresidencia Primera del Gobierno)		Javier Remírez	9 January 2026	Incumbent	PSN–PSOE	
First Vice Presidency (Vicepresidencia Primera del Gobierno)	See Department of the Presidency and Equality					
Second Vice Presidency (Vicepresidencia Segunda del Gobierno)		Ana Ollo	18 August 2023	Incumbent	GBai (GSB/GSV)	
Second Vice Presidency (Vicepresidencia Segunda del Gobierno)	See Department of Memory and Coexistence, Foreign Action and Basque Language					
Third Vice Presidency (Vicepresidencia Tercera del Gobierno)		Begoña Alfaro	18 August 2023	Incumbent	Contigo/Zurekin (Podemos)	
Third Vice Presidency (Vicepresidencia Tercera del Gobierno)	See Department of Housing, Youth and Migration Policies					
=== Department of the Presidency and Equality ===
Department of the Presidency and Equality (Departamento de Presidencia e Igualdad)		Félix Taberna	18 August 2023	9 January 2026	PSN–PSOE	
Department of the Presidency and Equality (Departamento de Presidencia e Igualdad)		Javier Remírez	9 January 2026	Incumbent	PSN–PSOE	
Department of the Presidency and Equality (Departamento de Presidencia e Igualdad)	31 August 2023 – present: (■) Directorate-General for the Presidency, Open Government and Relations with the Parliament of Navarre; (■) Service for Legal Advisory; (■) Service for Government Secretariat and Normative Action (until 24 Nov 2023) / Service for Government Secretariat, Institutional Relations and Normative Action (from 24 Nov 2023); (■) Service for Open Government and Citizen Attention; (■) Delegated Unit for Data Protection of the Government of Navarre; (■) Administrative Court of Navarre; (■) Directorate-General for Planning, Coordination, Innovation and Evaluation of Public Policies; (■) Service for Social Policy Planning, Innovation and Evaluation; (■) Navarre Statistical Institute–Nastat; (●) Analysis and Prospecting Office (est. 21 Oct 2023); (■) Service for Analysis, Evaluation, Innovation, Prospecting and Operational Strategy (est. 21 Oct 2023); (■) Directorate-General for Communication and Institutional Projection; (■) Service for Communication; (■) Service for Institutional Projection and Navarre Brand; (■) Technical General Secretariat of the Presidency and Equality; (●) Navarrese Institute for Equality; (■) Subdirectorate for Equality Governance; (■) Subdirectorate for Women Citizenship, Empowerment and Participation; (■) Subdirectorate for LGTBI+ Equality					
=== Department of Memory and Coexistence, Foreign Action and Basque Language ===
Department of Memory and Coexistence, Foreign Action and Basque Language (Departamento de Memoria y Convivencia, Acción Exterior y Euskera)		Ana Ollo	18 August 2023	Incumbent	GBai (GSB/GSV)	
Department of Memory and Coexistence, Foreign Action and Basque Language (Departamento de Memoria y Convivencia, Acción Exterior y Euskera)	31 August 2023 – present: (■) Directorate-General for Memory and Coexistence; (■) Service for Coexistence and Human Rights; (■) Navarrese Institute of Memory; (■) Directorate-General for Foreign Action; (■) Service for Interregional Cooperation and Foreign Citizenship; (■) Service for the European Projects Office; (■) Technical General Secretariat of Memory and Coexistence, Foreign Action and Basque Language; (●) Navarrese Institute of the Basque Language; (■) Service for the Development of the Basque Language in the Public Administrations; (■) Service for Language Resources; (■) Service for Planning and Promotion of the Basque Language					
=== Department of Housing, Youth and Migration Policies ===
Department of Housing, Youth and Migration Policies (Departamento de Vivienda, Juventud y Políticas Migratorias)		Begoña Alfaro	18 August 2023	Incumbent	Contigo/Zurekin (Podemos)	
Department of Housing, Youth and Migration Policies (Departamento de Vivienda, Juventud y Políticas Migratorias)	31 August 2023 – present: (■) Directorate-General for Housing; (■) Service for Housing; (■) Service for Inspection and Diffusion of Programs (until 24 Nov 2023) / Service for Innovation, Participation, Inspection and Diffusion (from 24 Nov 2023); (■) Directorate-General for Migration Policies; (■) Karibu Service for Migrant Reception and Accompaniment; (■) Ayllu Service for Intercultural Coexistence and Fight against Racism and Xenophobia; (■) Technical General Secretariat of Housing, Youth and Migration Policies; (●) Navarrese Youth Institute; (■) Subdirectorate for Youth					
=== Department of Economy and Finance ===
Department of Economy and Finance (Departamento de Economía y Hacienda)		Juan Cruz Cigudosa (temporary entrustment)	18 August 2023	30 August 2023	PSN–PSOE	
Department of Economy and Finance (Departamento de Economía y Hacienda)		José Luis Arasti	30 August 2023	Incumbent	PSN–PSOE	
Department of Economy and Finance (Departamento de Economía y Hacienda)	31 August 2023 – present: (■) Directorate-General for Economy–Next Generation; (■) Service for Economy and Financing; (■) Service for Coordination of the Recovery Plan and National Accounting; (■) Directorate-General for Budgets and Heritage; (■) Service for Budgets and Economic Programming; (■) Service for Heritage; (■) Directorate-General for the Comptroller's Office; (■) Service for Comptrolling; (■) Service for Financial Control and Audit; (■) Service for General and Budgetary Accounting; (■) Technical General Secretariat of Economy and Finance; (■) Foral Economic-Administrative Court of Navarre; (●) Foral Treasury of Navarre					
=== Department of Education ===
Department of Education (Departamento de Educación)		Carlos Gimeno	18 August 2023	Incumbent	PSN–PSOE	
Department of Education (Departamento de Educación)	31 August 2023 – present: (■) Directorate-General for Education; (■) Service for Planning, Training and Quality; (■) Service for Multilingualism and Artistic Teaching; (■) Service for Inclusion, Equality and Coexistence; (■) Service for Educational Inspection; (■) Service for Nursery Schools; (■) Directorate-General for Vocational Training, Digitalization and Educational Resources; (■) Service for Vocational Training Planning and Integration; (■) Service for Vocational Training Modernization and Innovation; (■) Service for Education Information Systems; (■) Service for Educational ICT Technologies and Infrastructure; (■) Service for Study Aids and Educational Services; (■) Directorate-General for Personnel and Infrastructure; (■) Service for Personnel Legal Regime; (■) Service for Teaching Personnel Selection and Provision; (■) Service for Temporary Personnel Management; (■) Service for Payroll and Social Security; (■) Service for Economic Studies and Centre Financing; (■) Service for Educational Infrastructure; (■) Technical General Secretariat of Education					
=== Department of Health ===
Department of Health (Departamento de Salud)		Fernando Domínguez	18 August 2023	Incumbent	GBai (Independent)	
Department of Health (Departamento de Salud)	31 August 2023 – present: (■) Directorate-General for Health; (■) Technical General Secretariat of Health; (●) Navarrese Health Service; (●) Institute of Public and Occupational Health of Navarre					
=== Department of Territorial Cohesion ===
Department of Territorial Cohesion (Departamento de Cohesión Territorial)		Óscar Chivite	18 August 2023	Incumbent	PSN–PSOE	
Department of Territorial Cohesion (Departamento de Cohesión Territorial)	31 August 2023 – present: (■) Directorate-General for Local Administration and Depopulation; (■) Service for Management and Economic Cooperation; (■) Service for Local Infrastructure; (■) Service for Legal Advice and Cooperation with the Local Entities; (■) Service for Demographic Challenge and Territorial Structuring; (■) Directorate-General for Public Works and Infrastructure; (■) Service for Studies and Projects; (■) Service for New Infrastructure; (■) Service for Conservation; (■) Directorate-General for Transport and Sustainable Mobility; (■) Service for Transport Inspection and Legal Regime; (■) Service for Transport Planning and Modernization; (■) Service for Transport Management, Planning and Mobility Service; (■) Directorate-General for Territory Planning; (■) Service for Territory and Landscape; (■) Legal–Administrative Service for Territory; (■) Service for Budget Economic Management and Expenditure Control; (■) Technical General Secretariat of Territorial Cohesion					
=== Department of Industry and Ecological and Digital Business Transition ===
Department of Industry and Ecological and Digital Business Transition (Departamento de Industria y Transición; Ecológica y Digital Empresarial)		Mikel Irujo	18 August 2023	Incumbent	GBai (EAJ/PNV)	
=== Department of Social Rights, Social Economy and Employment ===
Department of Social Rights, Social Economy and Employment (Departamento de Derechos Sociales, Economía Social y Empleo)		Mari Carmen Maeztu	18 August 2023	Incumbent	PSN–PSOE	
=== Department of University, Innovation and Digital Transformation ===
Department of University, Innovation and Digital Transformation (Departamento de Universidad, Innovación y Transformación Digital)		Juan Cruz Cigudosa	18 August 2023	5 December 2023 (resigned)	PSN–PSOE	
Department of University, Innovation and Digital Transformation (Departamento de Universidad, Innovación y Transformación Digital)		Félix Taberna (temporary entrustment)	6 December 2023	11 December 2023	PSN–PSOE	
Department of University, Innovation and Digital Transformation (Departamento de Universidad, Innovación y Transformación Digital)		Patricia Fanlo	11 December 2023	22 January 2025 (resigned)	PSN–PSOE	
Department of University, Innovation and Digital Transformation (Departamento de Universidad, Innovación y Transformación Digital)		Félix Taberna (temporary entrustment)	22 January 2025	28 January 2025	PSN–PSOE	
Department of University, Innovation and Digital Transformation (Departamento de Universidad, Innovación y Transformación Digital)		Juan Luis García	28 January 2025	Incumbent	PSN–PSOE	
=== Department of Interior, Civil Service and Justice ===
Department of Interior, Civil; Service and Justice (Departamento de Interior, Función; Pública y Justicia)		Amparo López	18 August 2023	9 January 2026	PSN–PSOE	
Department of Interior, Civil; Service and Justice (Departamento de Interior, Función; Pública y Justicia)		Félix Taberna (temporary entrustment)	4 April 2024	8 April 2024	PSN–PSOE	
Department of Interior, Civil; Service and Justice (Departamento de Interior, Función; Pública y Justicia)		Amparo López	8 April 2024	9 January 2026	PSN–PSOE	
Department of Interior, Civil; Service and Justice (Departamento de Interior, Función; Pública y Justicia)		Inma Jurío	9 January 2026	Incumbent	PSN–PSOE	
=== Department of Rural Development and Environment ===
Department of Rural Development and Environment (Departamento de Desarrollo Rural y Medio Ambiente)		José María Aierdi	18 August 2023	Incumbent	GBai (GSB/GSV)	
=== Department of Culture, Sports and Tourism ===
Department of Culture, Sports and Tourism (Departamento de Cultura, Deporte y Turismo)		Rebeca Esnaola	7 August 2019	18 August 2023	PSN–PSOE (Independent)	
=== Spokesperson of the Government ===
Spokesperson of the Government (Portavoz del Gobierno)		Félix Taberna (temporary entrustment)	18 August 2023	3 October 2023	PSN–PSOE	
Spokesperson of the Government (Portavoz del Gobierno)		Amparo López	3 October 2023	4 April 2024	PSN–PSOE	
Spokesperson of the Government (Portavoz del Gobierno)		Félix Taberna (temporary entrustment)	4 April 2024	8 April 2024	PSN–PSOE	
Spokesperson of the Government (Portavoz del Gobierno)		Amparo López	8 April 2024	9 January 2026	PSN–PSOE	
Spokesperson of the Government (Portavoz del Gobierno)		Javier Remírez	9 January 2026	Incumbent	PSN–PSOE	

== Notes ==
Preceded by Chivite I	Government of Navarre; 2023–present	Incumbent
