= First government of María Chivite =

1st government of María Chivite
- Government of Navarre
- 2019–2023
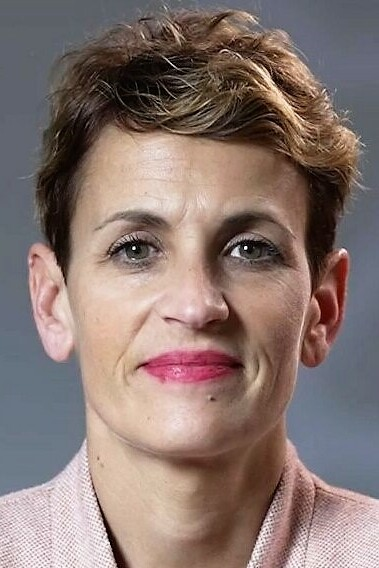
- María Chivite in March 2023.
- Date formed: 7 August 2019
- Date dissolved: 18 August 2023

People and organisations
- Monarch: Felipe VI
- President: María Chivite
- Vice Presidents: Javier Remírez ^{(1st)} José María Aierdi ^{(2nd)}
- No. of ministers: 13 (Note: Does not include the President.)
- Total no. of members: 14
- Member party: PSN–PSOE; GBai; Podemos
- Status in legislature: Minority (coalition)
- Opposition party: NA+
- Opposition leader: Javier Esparza

History
- Election: 2019 regional election
- Legislature term: 10th Parliament
- Budget: 2020, 2021, 2022, 2023
- Predecessor: Barkos
- Successor: Chivite II

The first government of María Chivite was formed on 7 August 2019, following the latter's election as president of the Government of Navarre by the Parliament of Navarre on 2 August and her swearing-in on 6 August, as a result of the Socialist Party of Navarre (PSN–PSOE) being able to muster a majority of seats in the Parliament together with Geroa Bai (GBai) and Podemos, with external support from EH Bildu and Izquierda-Ezkerra (I–E), following the 2019 Navarrese regional election. It succeeded the Barkos government and was the Government of Navarre from 7 August 2019 to 18 August 2023, a total of 1,472 days, or 4 years and 11 days.

The cabinet comprised members of the PSN–PSOE, GBai—with the involvement of the Basque Nationalist Party (EAJ/PNV) and, from September 2020, also Future Social Greens (GSB/GSV)—and Podemos, as well as a number of independents proposed by the first two parties. It was automatically dismissed on 29 May 2023 as a consequence of the 2023 regional election, but remained in acting capacity until the next government was sworn in.

== Investiture ==
Investiture; María Chivite (PSN)
Ballot →	1 August 2019	2 August 2019
Required majority →	26 out of 50	Simple
Yes: • PSN (11); • GBai (9); • Podemos (2); • I–E (n) (1)	23 / 50	23 / 50
No: • NA+ (20); • EH Bildu (7) (2 on 2 Aug)	27 / 50	22 / 50
Abstentions: • EH Bildu (5) (on 2 Aug)	0 / 50	5 / 50
Absentees	0 / 50	0 / 50

== Cabinet changes ==
Chivite's first government saw a number of cabinet changes during its tenure:

- On 29 January 2021, Minister of Economic and Business Development Manu Ayerdi resigned after being accused of embezzlement by the Supreme Court of Spain in the "Davalor case", the alleged irregular grant of 2.6 million euros to a company that was in crisis in the 2015–2017 period. Mikel Irujo was appointed to replace Ayerdi in his post.
- On 7 September 2022, Economy and Finance minister Elma Saiz replaced Javier Remírez in the post of spokesperson of the Government, in what said to constitute a move to advance her candidacy for the mayorship of Pamplona in the 2023 local election. On 28 April 2023, less than one month before the election, Saiz resigned from all her cabinet posts to focus on her candidacy, with Remírez recovering the post of spokesperson and the economy and finance ministry being temporarily handed over to Minister of University, Innovation and Digital Transformation Juan Cruz Cigudosa.

== Council of Government ==
The Council of Government is structured into the offices for the president, the two vice presidents and 13 ministries.

← Chivite I Government → (7 August 2019 – 18 August 2023)
Portfolio	Name	Party	Took office	Left office	Ref.
President	María Chivite	PSN–PSOE	6 August 2019	17 August 2023	
First Vice President; Minister of the Presidency, Equality, Civil Service and Interior; Spokesperson of the Government	Javier Remírez	PSN–PSOE	7 August 2019	7 September 2022	
Second Vice President; Minister of Territory Planning, Housing, Landscape and Strategic Projects	José María Aierdi	GBai (PNV / GSV) (Note: Joined GSV in September 2020.)	7 August 2019	18 August 2023	
Minister of Territorial Cohesion	Bernardo Ciriza	PSN–PSOE	7 August 2019	18 August 2023	
Minister of Economy and Finance	Elma Saiz	PSN–PSOE	7 August 2019	7 September 2022	
Minister of Economic and Business Development	Manu Ayerdi	GBai (PNV)	7 August 2019	29 January 2021	
Minister of Migration Policies and Justice	Eduardo Santos	Podemos	7 August 2019	18 August 2023	
Minister of Education	Carlos Gimeno	PSN–PSOE	7 August 2019	18 August 2023	
Minister of Social Rights	Mari Carmen Maeztu	PSN–PSOE	7 August 2019	18 August 2023	
Minister of Health	Santos Induráin	Independent	7 August 2019	18 August 2023	
Minister of Citizen Relations	Ana Ollo	GBai (Ind. / GSV)	7 August 2019	18 August 2023	
Minister of University, Innovation and Digital Transformation	Juan Cruz Cigudosa	PSN–PSOE	7 August 2019	18 August 2023	
Minister of Rural Development and Environment	Itziar Gómez	GBai (Ind. / GSV)	7 August 2019	18 August 2023	
Minister of Culture and Sports	Rebeca Esnaola	Independent	7 August 2019	18 August 2023	
=== Changes February 2021 ===
Portfolio	Name	Party	Took office	Left office	Ref.
Minister of Economic and Business Development	Mikel Irujo	GBai (PNV)	4 February 2021	18 August 2023	
=== Changes September 2022 ===
Portfolio	Name	Party	Took office	Left office	Ref.
First Vice President; Minister of the Presidency, Equality, Civil Service and Interior	Javier Remírez	PSN–PSOE	7 September 2022	2 May 2023	
Minister of Economy and Finance; Spokesperson of the Government	Elma Saiz	PSN–PSOE	7 September 2022	28 April 2023	
=== Changes May 2023 ===
Portfolio	Name	Party	Took office	Left office	Ref.
First Vice President; Minister of the Presidency, Equality, Civil Service and Interior; Spokesperson of the Government	Javier Remírez	PSN–PSOE	2 May 2023	14 August 2023	
Minister of Economy and Finance	Juan Cruz Cigudosa was temporarily entrusted with the office's portfolio from 2 May to 18 August 2023.				
=== Changes August 2023 ===
First Vice President	Vacant from 14 to 18 August 2023.				
Minister of the Presidency, Equality, Civil Service and Interior	Bernardo Ciriza was temporarily entrusted with the office's portfolio from 14 to 18 August 2023.				
Spokesperson of the Government	Vacant from 14 to 18 August 2023.				

== Departmental structure ==
María Chivite's government is organised into several superior and governing units, whose number, powers and hierarchical structure may vary depending on the ministerial department.

Unit/body rank

- (■) Director-general
- (■) Service

Office (Original name)	Portrait	Name	Took office	Left office	Alliance/party	Ref.
=== Presidency ===
Presidency (Presidencia del Gobierno)		María Chivite	6 August 2019	17 August 2023	PSN–PSOE	
First Vice Presidency (Vicepresidencia Primera del Gobierno)		Javier Remírez	7 August 2019	14 August 2023 (renounced)	PSN–PSOE	
First Vice Presidency (Vicepresidencia Primera del Gobierno)	See Department of the Presidency, Equality, Civil Service and Interior					
Second Vice Presidency (Vicepresidencia Segunda del Gobierno)		José María Aierdi	7 August 2019	18 August 2023	GBai (GSB/GSV from Sep 2020; EAJ/PNV until Sep 2020)	
Second Vice Presidency (Vicepresidencia Segunda del Gobierno)	See Department of Territory Planning, Housing, Landscape and Strategic Projects					
=== Department of the Presidency, Equality, Civil Service and Interior ===
Department of the Presidency, Equality, Civil Service and Interior (Departamento de Presidencia, Igualdad, Función Pública e Interior)		Javier Remírez	7 August 2019	14 August 2023 (renounced)	PSN–PSOE	
Department of the Presidency, Equality, Civil Service and Interior (Departamento de Presidencia, Igualdad, Función Pública e Interior)		Bernardo Ciriza (temporary entrustment)	14 August 2023	18 August 2023	PSN–PSOE	
Department of the Presidency, Equality, Civil Service and Interior (Departamento de Presidencia, Igualdad, Función Pública e Interior)	15 August 2019 – 31 August 2023: (■) Directorate-General for the Presidency and Open Government; (■) Service for Legal Advisory; (■) Service for Government Secretariat and Normative Action; (■) Service for Open Government and Citizen Attention; (■) Delegated Unit for Data Protection of the Government of Navarre; (■) Administrative Court of Navarre; (■) Directorate-General for Civil Service; (■) Service for Personnel Expenditure Control and Payroll; (■) Service for Personnel Management; (■) Service for Civil Service Ordinance; (■) Service for Labour Relations and Social Benefits; (■) Service for Personnel Structure, Post Organization and Staff; (■) Directorate-General for the Interior; (■) Service for Security Policy Development; (■) Service for Legal Regime of the Interior; (■) Fire Service of Navarre; (■) Service for Civil Protection and Emergencies; (■) Directorate-General for Communication and Institutional Relations; (■) Service for Communication–Office of the Spokesperson of the Government (until 15 Sep 2022) / Service for Communication (from 15 Sep 2022); (■) Service for Institutional Projection; (■) Technical General Secretariat of the Presidency, Equality, Civil Service and Interior					
=== Department of Territory Planning, Housing, Landscape and Strategic Projects ===
Department of Territory Planning, Housing, Landscape and Strategic Projects (Departamento de Ordenación del Territorio, Vivienda, Paisaje y Proyectos Estratégicos)		José María Aierdi	7 August 2019	18 August 2023	GBai (GSB/GSV from Sep 2020; EAJ/PNV until Sep 2020)	
Department of Territory Planning, Housing, Landscape and Strategic Projects (Departamento de Ordenación del Territorio, Vivienda, Paisaje y Proyectos Estratégicos)	15 August 2019 – 31 August 2023: (■) Directorate-General for Territory Planning; (■) Service for Territory and Landscape; (■) Legal Service and for Territorial Planning; (■) Directorate-General for Housing; (■) Service for Housing; (■) Service for Inspection and Diffusion of Programs; (■) Directorate-General for Strategic Projects; (■) Service for Planning and Development of Strategic Projects; (■) Technical General Secretariat of Territory Planning, Housing, Landscape and Strategic Projects					
=== Department of Territorial Cohesion ===
Department of Territorial Cohesion (Departamento de Cohesión Territorial)		Bernardo Ciriza	7 August 2019	18 August 2023	PSN–PSOE	
Department of Territorial Cohesion (Departamento de Cohesión Territorial)	15 August 2019 – 31 August 2023: (■) Directorate-General for Local Administration and Depopulation; (■) Service for Management and Economic Cooperation; (■) Service for Local Infrastructure; (■) Service for Legal Advice and Cooperation with the Local Entities; (■) Directorate-General for Public Works and Infrastructure; (■) Service for Studies and Projects; (■) Service for New Infrastructure; (■) Service for Conservation; (■) Directorate-General for Transport (until 1 Jul 2021) / Directorate-General for Transport and Sustainable Mobility (from 1 Jul 2021); (■) Service for Transport Planning and Legal Regime; (■) Service for Inspection, Management, Transport Planning and Mobility; (■) Service for Budget Economic Management and Expenditure Control; (■) Technical General Secretariat of Territorial Cohesion					
=== Department of Economy and Finance ===
Department of Economy and Finance (Departamento de Economía y Hacienda)		Elma Saiz	7 August 2019	28 April 2023 (resigned)	PSN–PSOE	
Department of Economy and Finance (Departamento de Economía y Hacienda)		Juan Cruz Cigudosa (temporary entrustment)	2 May 2023	18 August 2023	PSN–PSOE	
Department of Economy and Finance (Departamento de Economía y Hacienda)	15 August 2019 – 10 February 2021: (■) Directorate-General for Budgets, Heritage and Economic Policy; (■) Service for Budgets and Economic Programming; (■) Service for Economy and Financing; (■) Service for Heritage; (■) Directorate-General for the Comptroller's Office and Accounting; (■) Service for Comptrolling; (■) Service for Permanent Financial Control and Audit; (■) Service for Accounting; (■) Service for Legal Control; (■) Technical General Secretariat of Economy and Finance; (■) Foral Economic-Administrative Court of Navarre; 10 February 2021 – 30 March 2022: (■) Directorate-General for Budgets, Heritage and Economic Policy; (■) Service for Budgets and Economic Programming; (■) Service for Economy and Financing; (■) Service for Heritage; (■) General Comptroller's Office (until 12 Mar 2021) / Directorate-General for the Comptroller's Office (from 12 Mar 2021); (■) Service for Comptrolling; (■) Service for Permanent Financial Control and Audit; (■) Service for Legal Control; (■) Next Generation Office (until 12 Mar 2021) / Directorate-General for the Next Generation Office (from 12 Mar 2021); (■) Technical General Secretariat of Economy and Finance; (■) Foral Economic-Administrative Court of Navarre; 30 March 2022 – 31 August 2023: (■) Directorate-General for Budgets, Heritage and Economic Policy; (■) Service for Budgets and Economic Programming; (■) Service for Economy and Financing; (■) Service for Heritage; (■) Directorate-General for the Comptroller's Office; (■) Service for Comptrolling; (■) Service for Permanent Financial Control and Audit; (■) Service for General and Budgetary Accounting; (■) Service for Coordination of the Recovery, Transformation and Resilience Plan and National Accounting; (■) Service for Legal Control; (■) Technical General Secretariat of Economy and Finance; (■) Foral Economic-Administrative Court of Navarre					
=== Department of Economic and Business Development ===
Department of Economic and Business Development (Departamento de Desarrollo; Económico y Empresarial)		Manu Ayerdi	7 August 2019	29 January 2021 (resigned)	GBai (EAJ/PNV)	
Department of Economic and Business Development (Departamento de Desarrollo; Económico y Empresarial)		Mikel Irujo	4 February 2021	18 August 2023	GBai (EAJ/PNV)	
Department of Economic and Business Development (Departamento de Desarrollo; Económico y Empresarial)	15 August 2019 – 31 August 2023: (■) Directorate-General for Business Policy, International Projection and Labour; (■) Service for Competitiveness; (■) Service for International Projection; (■) Service for Industry Promotion; (■) Service for Labour; (■) Directorate-General for Industry, Energy and S3 Strategic Projects (until 19 May 2022) / Directorate-General for Industry, Energy and S4 Strategic Projects (from 19 May 2022); (■) Service for S3 Strategic Projects (until 19 May 2022) / Service for S4 Strategic Projects (from 19 May 2022); (■) Service for Energy Transition; (■) Service for Industrial Planning, Energy Infrastructure and Mines; (■) Directorate-General for Tourism, Trade and Consumer Affairs; (■) Service for Tourism Planning and Innovation; (■) Service for Tourism Marketing and Internationalization; (■) Service for Tourism and Trade Management and Promotion; (■) Service for Consumer Affairs and Arbitration; (■) Technical General Secretariat of Economic and Business Development					
=== Department of Migration Policies and Justice ===
Department of Migration; Policies and Justice (Departamento de Políticas; Migratorias y Justicia)		Eduardo Santos	7 August 2019	18 August 2023	Podemos	
Department of Migration; Policies and Justice (Departamento de Políticas; Migratorias y Justicia)	15 August 2019 – 31 August 2023: (■) Directorate-General for Migration Policies; (■) Karibu Service for Migrant Reception and Accompaniment; (■) Ayllu Service for Intercultural Coexistence and Fight against Racism and Xenophobia; (■) Directorate-General for Justice; (■) Service for Human Resources and New Judicial and Fiscal Office; (■) Service for Judicial Infrastructure; (■) Social Service for Justice; (■) Technical General Secretariat of Migration Policies and Justice					
=== Department of Education ===
Department of Education (Departamento de Educación)		Carlos Gimeno	7 August 2019	18 August 2023	PSN–PSOE	
Department of Education (Departamento de Educación)	15 August 2019 – 31 August 2023: (■) Directorate-General for Education; (■) Service for Planning, Training and Quality; (■) Service for Multilingualism and Artistic Teaching; (■) Service for Inclusion, Equality and Coexistence; (■) Service for Educational ICT Technologies and Infrastructure; (■) Service for Education Information Systems; (■) Service for Educational Inspection; (■) Directorate-General for Vocational Training; (■) Service for Vocational Training Planning and Innovation; (■) Service for Professional Qualifications, Business and Employment; (■) Directorate-General for Educational Resources; (■) Service for Personnel Legal Regime; (■) Service for Teaching Personnel Selection and Provision; (■) Service for Temporary Personnel Management; (■) Service for Economic Studies and Payroll; (■) Service for Centre Financing, Study Aids and Complementary Services; (■) Service for Educational Infrastructure; (■) Technical General Secretariat of Education					
=== Department of Social Rights ===
Department of Social Rights (Departamento de Derechos Sociales)		Mari Carmen Maeztu	7 August 2019	18 August 2023	PSN–PSOE	
Department of Social Rights (Departamento de Derechos Sociales)	15 August 2019 – 31 August 2023: (■) Directorate-General for Social Protection and Development Cooperation; (■) Service for Primary Care and Social Inclusion; (■) Service for Income Guarantee and Development Cooperation; (■) Directorate-General for the Observatory of Social Reality and Social Policy Planning and Evaluation; (■) Service for the Observatory of Social Reality; (■) Service for Digital Promotion and Transformation; (■) Technical General Secretariat of Social Rights					
=== Department of Health ===
Department of Health (Departamento de Salud)		Santos Induráin	7 August 2019	18 August 2023	PSN–PSOE (Independent)	
Department of Health (Departamento de Salud)	15 August 2019 – 31 August 2023: (■) Directorate-General for Health; (■) Service for Health Citizenship, Insurance and Guarantees; (■) Service for Planning, Evaluation and Knowledge Management; (■) Technical General Secretariat of Health					
=== Department of Citizen Relations ===
Department of Citizen Relations (Departamento de Relaciones Ciudadanas)		Ana Ollo	7 August 2019	18 August 2023	GBai (GSB/GSV from Sep 2020; Indep. until Sep 2020)	
Department of Citizen Relations (Departamento de Relaciones Ciudadanas)	15 August 2019 – 31 August 2023: (■) Directorate-General for Foreign Action; (■) Service for European Action, Interregional Cooperation and Foreign Citizenship; (■) Directorate-General for Peace, Coexistence and Human Rights; (■) Service for Coexistence and Human Rights; (■) Navarrese Institute of Memory; (■) Technical General Secretariat of Citizen Relations					
=== Department of University, Innovation and Digital Transformation ===
Department of University, Innovation and Digital Transformation (Departamento de Universidad, Innovación y Transformación Digital)		Juan Cruz Cigudosa	7 August 2019	18 August 2023	PSN–PSOE	
Department of University, Innovation and Digital Transformation (Departamento de Universidad, Innovación y Transformación Digital)	15 August 2019 – 31 August 2023: (■) Directorate-General for University; (■) Service for University; (■) Directorate-General for Innovation; (■) Service for RDI; (■) Directorate-General for Digital Transformation (until 22 Feb 2020) / Directorate-General for Telecommunications and Digitization (from 22 Feb 2020); (■) Service for Technological Infrastructure and Support Centre; (■) Service for Departmental Information Systems; (■) Service for Health Technologies; (■) Service for Electronic Administration, Finance, HR and SITNA; (■) Service for Digital Advance; (■) Technical General Secretariat of University, Innovation and Digital Transformation					
=== Department of Rural Development and Environment ===
Department of Rural Development and Environment (Departamento de Desarrollo Rural y Medio Ambiente)		Itziar Gómez	7 August 2019	18 August 2023	GBai (GSB/GSV from Sep 2020; Indep. until Sep 2020)	
Department of Rural Development and Environment (Departamento de Desarrollo Rural y Medio Ambiente)	15 August 2019 – 31 August 2023: (■) Directorate-General for Rural Development; (■) Service for Agricultural Operations and Food Development; (■) Service for Paying Agency; (■) Service for Rural Diversification and Development; (■) Directorate-General for Agriculture and Livestock; (■) Service for Agriculture; (■) Service for Livestock; (■) Service for Agricultural Infrastructure; (■) Directorate-General for Environment; (■) Service for Circular Economy and Climate Change; (■) Service for Biodiversity; (■) Service for Forest and Hunting; (■) Service for Nursery and Quality of Environmental Management; (■) Technical General Secretariat of Rural Development and Environment					
=== Department of Culture and Sports ===
Department of Culture and Sports (Departamento de Cultura y Deporte)		Rebeca Esnaola	7 August 2019	18 August 2023	PSN–PSOE (Independent)	
Department of Culture and Sports (Departamento de Cultura y Deporte)	15 August 2019 – 31 August 2023: (■) Directorate-General for Culture–Prince of Viana Institution; (■) Service for Historical Heritage; (■) Service for Archives and Documentary Heritage; (■) Service for Museums; (■) Service for Libraries; (■) Service for Cultural Action; (■) Technical General Secretariat of Culture and Sports					
=== Spokesperson of the Government ===
Spokesperson of the Government (Portavoz del Gobierno)		Javier Remírez	7 August 2019	7 September 2022	PSN–PSOE	
Spokesperson of the Government (Portavoz del Gobierno)		Elma Saiz	7 September 2022	28 April 2023 (resigned)	PSN–PSOE	
Spokesperson of the Government (Portavoz del Gobierno)		Javier Remírez	2 May 2023	14 August 2023 (renounced)	PSN–PSOE	

== Notes ==
Preceded by Barkos	Government of Navarre; 2019–2023	Succeeded by Chivite II
