= Bernardo Ciriza =

Spanish politician

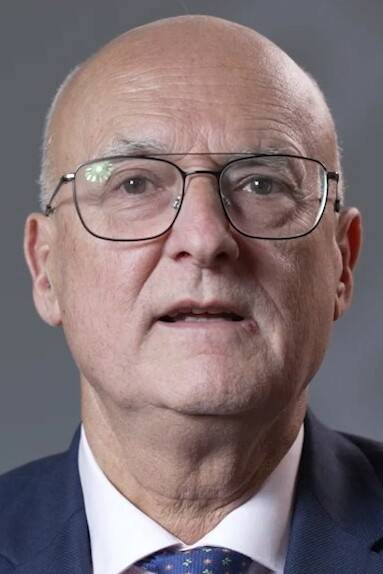
- Bernardo Ciriza in 2023.

Minister of Territorial Cohesion of Navarre
- In office 7 August 2019 – 18 August 2023
- President: María Chivite
- Preceded by: Isabel Elizalde
- Succeeded by: Óscar Chivite

Personal details
- Born: Bernardo Ciriza Pérez; 1955 (age 70–71) Falces, Navarre
- Party: Socialist Party of Navarre

Bernardo Ciriza Pérez (born 1955) is a Navarrese politician, and Minister of Territorial Cohesion of Navarre since August 2019.
