= Juan Luis García Martín =

Spanish politician (born 1971)

Juan Luis García

Minister of University, Innovation and Digital Transformation of Navarre
- Incumbent
- Assumed office 28 January 2025
- President: María Chivite
- Preceded by: Patricia Fanlo

Personal details
- Born: Juan Luis García Martín; 1971 (age 54–55) Cáceres, Spain
- Party: Socialist Party of Navarre

Juan Luis García Martín (born 1971) is a Navarrese politician, who has served as Minister of university, Innovation and Digital Transformation of Navarre since January 2025.
