= Elma Saiz =

Spanish politician and lawyer (born 1975)

The Most Excellent Elma Saiz
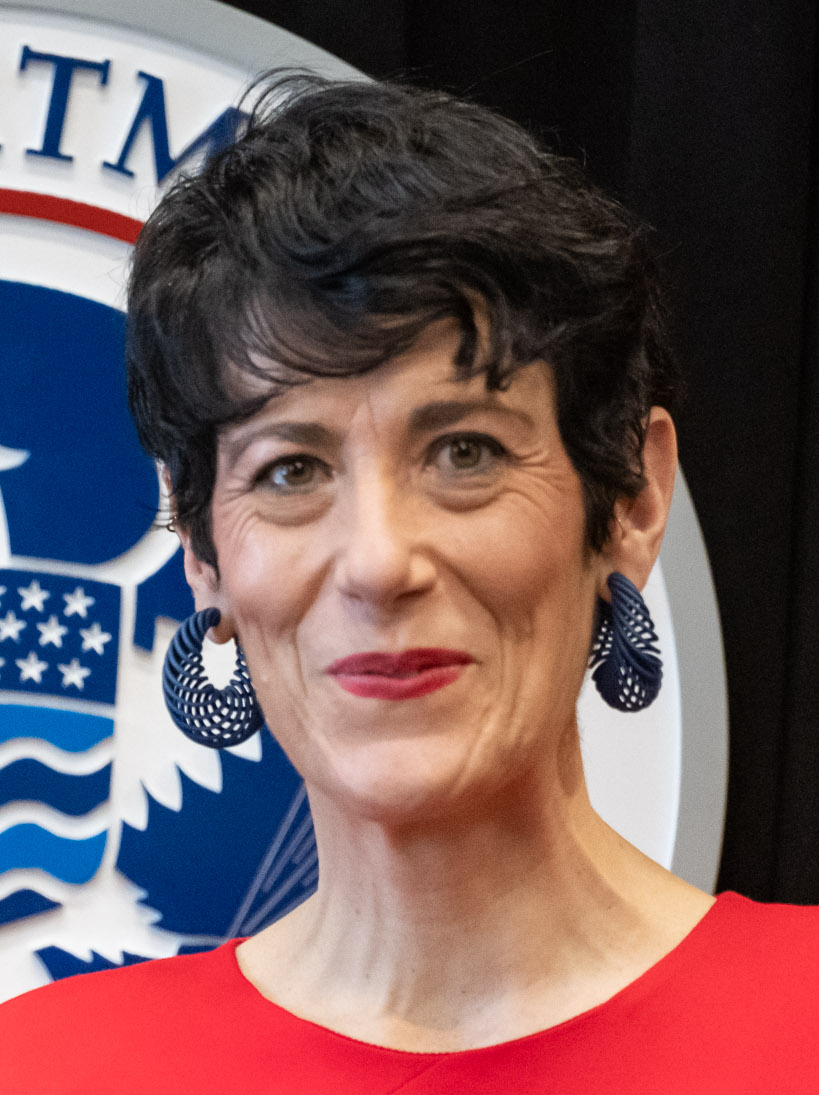
- Elma Saiz in 2024

Minister of Inclusion, Social Security and Migration
- Incumbent
- Assumed office 21 November 2023
- Monarch: Felipe VI
- Prime Minister: Pedro Sánchez
- Preceded by: José Luis Escrivá

Regional Minister of Economy and Finance of Navarre
- In office 7 August 2019 – 2 May 2023
- President: María Chivite
- Preceded by: Mikel Aranburu
- Succeeded by: José Luis Arasti

Delegate of the Government in Navarre
- In office 30 April 2008 – 9 January 2012
- Preceded by: Vicente Ripa
- Succeeded by: Carmen Alba

Member of the Pamplona City Council
- In office 17 June 2023 – 20 November 2023

Personal details
- Born: Elma Saiz Delgado; 2 December 1975 (age 50) Pamplona, Spain
- Party: Spanish Socialist Workers' Party (2004–present)
- Other political affiliations: Socialist Party of Navarre (2004–present)
- Education: University of Navarra
- Occupation: Politician and lawyer

Elma Saiz Delgado (pronounced [ˈelma ˈsajθ]; born 2 December 1975) is a Spanish politician who is serving as minister of Inclusion, Social Security and Migration since 2023. Before her incumbency, she was Regional Minister of Economy and Finance of Navarre between 2019 and 2023, and a member of the Pamplona City Council.

Saiz was born in Pamplona, Spain, in 1975. She is graduated in Law from the University of Navarra and has a Master's degree in Tax Consulting from the same university.

On 20 November 2024 it was announced that she intended to grant work permits to 300,000 undocumented migrants a year in a 3 year scheme to boost the nation's labour force by 900,000.
