= Eduardo Santos Itoiz =

Navarrese politician

Eduardo Santos
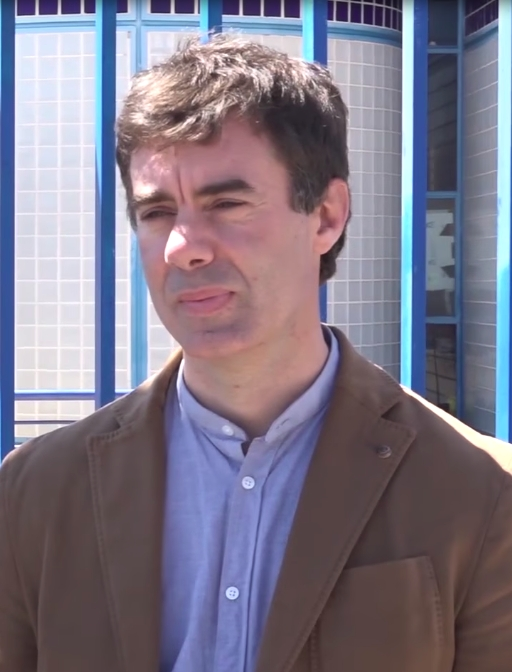

Minister of Migration Policies and Justice of Navarre
- In office 7 August 2019 – 18 August 2023
- President: María Chivite
- Preceded by: María José Beaumont
- Succeeded by: Amparo López

Personal details
- Born: Eduardo Santos Itoiz; 20 November 1973 (age 52) Pamplona, Navarre
- Party: Podemos

Eduardo Santos Itoiz (born 20 November 1973) is a Navarrese politician, current Minister of Migration Policies and Justice of Navarre (2019-2023). He was elected deputy for the Navarra constituency in Congress of Deputies during the XI and XII legislatures between 2015 and 2019.

He graduated in law from the University of Navarre (UN - Universidad de Navarra), he conducted research at the Public University of Navarre (UPNA - Universidad Pública de Navarra) and is an academic expert in mediation and family guidance from National University for Distance Education (UNED - Universidad Nacional de Educación a Distancia).

He had been an associate professor at UPNA in criminal law, criminology and penitentiary law (2007-2015) and professor at the School of Legal Practice "Estanislao de Aranzadi” (2003-2015).

Between 1996 and 2005, Eduardo was a practicing lawyer and, starting from 2008, he had been a penal mediator, participating also in the mediation processes between victims and former ETA members (2010-2011).

Under his mandate, Navarre has been one of the most fruitful regions in Spain in terms of restorative justice developments and migrations policies which stands to protect the most vulnerable such as unaccompanied migrant minors (with the KIDEAK program, based on social mentorship) or promoting new ways of international protection for refugee people such as community sponsorship based programs.

Also during this legislative period the Parliament of Navarre has approved two pioneering laws prompted by the Department of Migration Policies and Justice: the approval of the new Foral Law of restorative justice, mediation, and community restorative practices stands as an avant-garde element at the Spanish policy level, being the only specific restorative justice legislation in the country. Also, with the collaboration of many associations, collectives and social activists it has been passed the Law against racism and xenophobia, that will be a transversal tool to fight against racism and discrimination in several scenarios such as education, public administration, artificial intelligence or the media.
