= Inma Jurío =

Navarrese politician

Minister of Interior, Civil Service and Justice of Navarre
- Incumbent
- Assumed office 9 January 2026
- President: María Chivite
- Preceded by: Amparo López

Personal details
- Born: Inmaculada Jurío Macaya; 1970 (age 55–56) Tafalla, Spain
- Party: Socialist Party of Navarre

Inmaculada "Inma" Jurío Macaya (born 1970) is a Navarrese politician, who will be assuming office as Minister of Interior, Civil Service and Justice of Navarre in January 2026.
