= Patricia Fanlo =

Spanish researcher, politician (born 1978)

Minister of University, Innovation and Digital Transformation of Navarre
- In office 11 December 2023 – 22 January 2025
- President: María Chivite
- Preceded by: Juan Cruz Cigudosa
- Succeeded by: Juan Luis García

Personal details
- Born: Patricia Fanlo Mateo; 24 May 1978 (age 48) Huesca, Spain
- Party: Socialist Party of Navarre

Patricia Fanlo Mateo (born 24 May 1978) is a Navarrese politician, who served as Minister of University, Innovation and Digital Transformation of Navarre from 2023 to 2025.
