= 1995 Navarrese regional election =

Election in the Spanish region of Navarre

- 28 May 1995

All 50 seats in the Parliament of Navarre 26 seats needed for a majority
- Opinion polls
- Registered: 437,797 ▲5.5%
- Turnout: 299,545 (68.4%) ▲1.7 pp
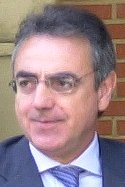

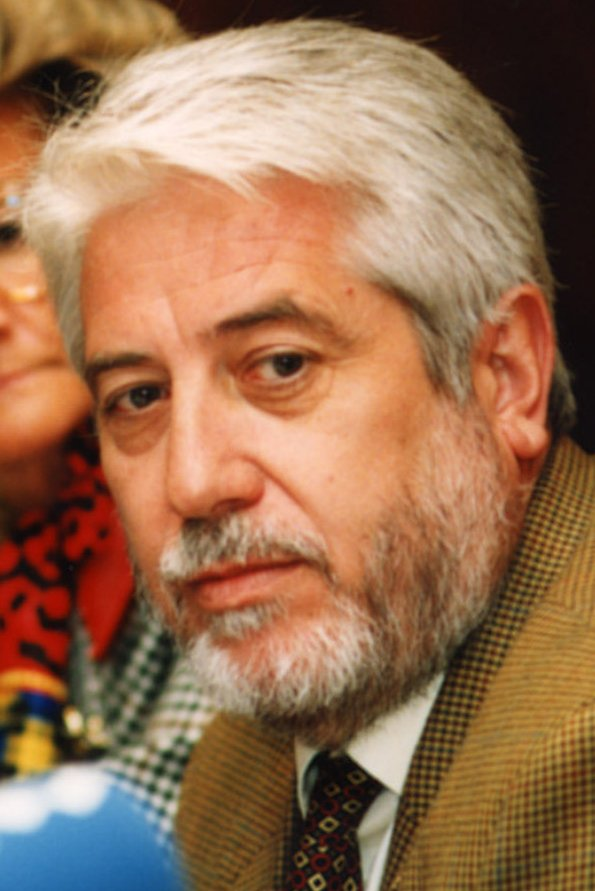

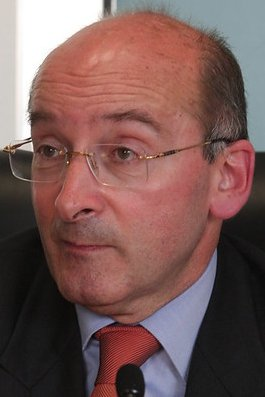

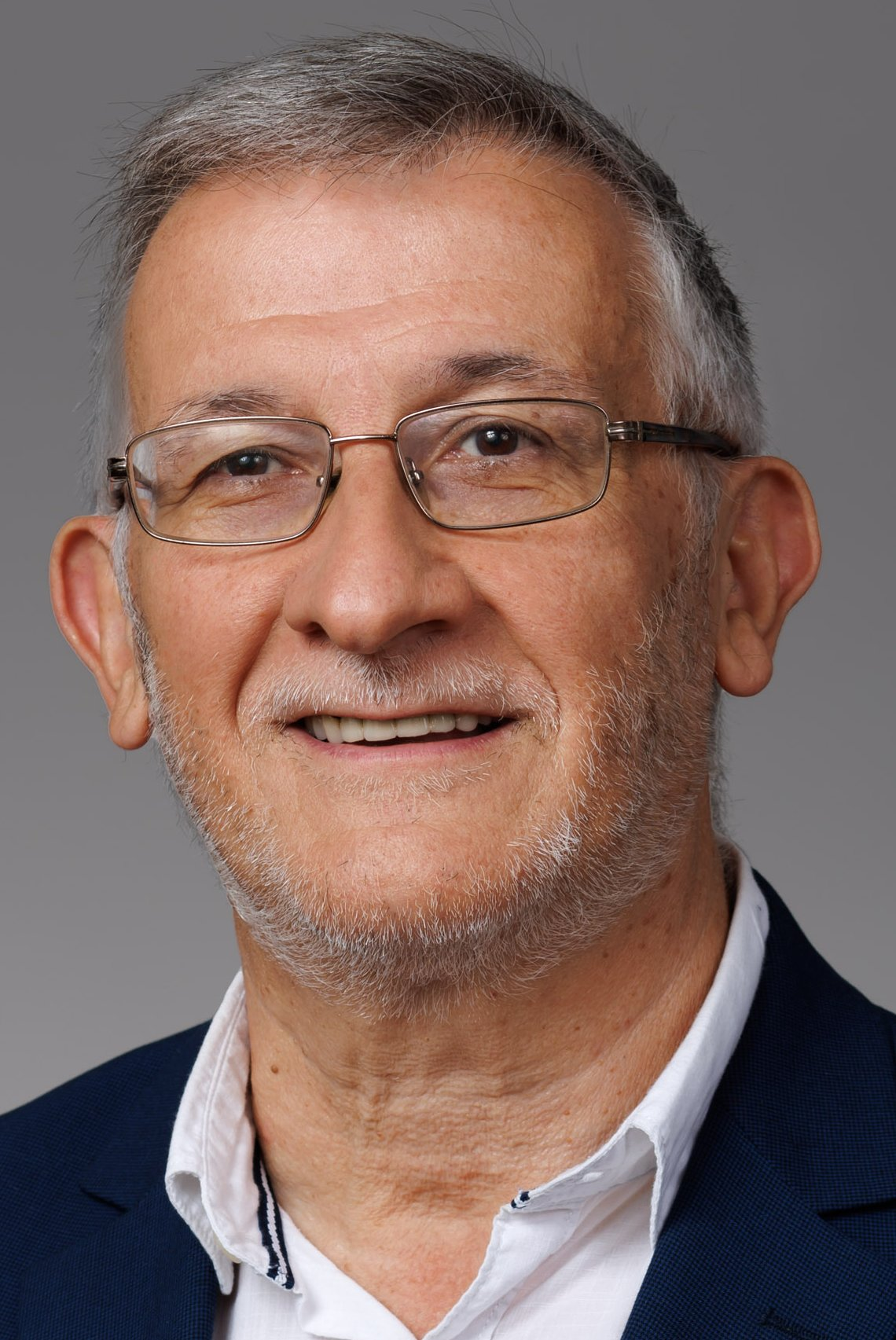

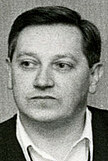

	First party	Second party	Third party
Leader	Miguel Sanz	Javier Otano	Juan Cruz Alli
Party	UPN	PSN–PSOE	CDN
Leader since	17 January 1995	20 June 1994	10 April 1995
Last election	20 seats, 35.0%	19 seats, 35.5% (Note: Results for PSOE (33.4%, 19 seats) and EE (2.1%, 0 seats) in the 1991 election.)	Did not contest
Seats won	17	11	10
Seat change	▼3	▼8	▲10
Popular vote	93,163	62,021	55,153
Percentage	31.3%	20.9%	18.6%
Swing	▼3.6 pp	▼14.6 pp	New party
	Fourth party	Fifth party	Sixth party
Leader	Félix Taberna	Patxi Zabaleta	Fermín Ciaurriz
Party	IU/EB	HB	EA
Leader since	1991	1991	1991
Last election	2 seats, 4.1%	6 seats, 11.2%	3 seats, 5.5%
Seats won	5	5	2
Seat change	▲3	▼1	▼1
Popular vote	27,773	27,404	13,568
Percentage	9.3%	9.2%	4.6%
Swing	▲5.2 pp	▼2.0 pp	▼0.9 pp
President before election
Juan Cruz Alli
CDN
President after election
Javier Otano
PSN–PSOE

A regional election was held in Navarre on 28 May 1995 to elect the 4th Parliament of the chartered community. All 50 seats in the Parliament were up for election. It was held concurrently with regional elections in twelve other autonomous communities and local elections all across Spain.

== Overview ==
Under the 1982 Reintegration and Improvement of the Chartered Regime, the Parliament of Navarre was the unicameral legislature of the homonymous chartered community, having legislative power in devolved matters, as well as the ability to grant or withdraw confidence from a regional president. The electoral and procedural rules were supplemented by national law provisions.

=== Date ===
The term of the Parliament of Navarre expired four years after the date of its previous ordinary election, with election day being fixed for the fourth Sunday of May every four years. The election decree was required to be issued no later than 54 days before the scheduled election date and published on the following day in the Official Gazette of Navarre (BON). The previous election was held on 26 May 1991, setting the date for election day on the fourth Sunday of May four years later, which was 28 May 1995.

The Parliament of Navarre could not be dissolved before the expiration date of parliament.

The election to the Parliament of Navarre was officially called on 4 April 1995 with the publication of the corresponding decree in the BON, setting election day for 28 May and scheduling for the chamber to reconvene on 26 June.

=== Electoral system ===
Voting for the Parliament was based on universal suffrage, comprising all Spanish nationals over 18 years of age, registered in Navarre and with full political rights, provided that they had not been deprived of the right to vote by a final sentence, nor were legally incapacitated.

The Parliament of Navarre had a minimum of 40 and a maximum of 60 seats, with electoral provisions fixing its size at 50. All were elected in a single multi-member constituency—corresponding to the chartered community's territory—using the D'Hondt method and closed-list proportional voting, with a three percent-threshold of valid votes (including blank ballots) regionally.

The law did not provide for by-elections to fill vacant seats; instead, any vacancies arising after the proclamation of candidates and during the legislative term were filled by the next candidates on the party lists or, when required, by designated substitutes.

== Parties and candidates ==
The electoral law allowed for parties and federations registered in the interior ministry, alliances and groupings of electors to present lists of candidates. Parties and federations intending to form a coalition ahead of an election were required to inform the relevant electoral commission within 10 days of the election call, whereas groupings of electors needed to secure the signature of at least one percent of the electorate in Navarre, disallowing electors from signing for more than one list.

Below is a list of the main parties and alliances which contested the election:

Candidacy	Parties and alliances	Leading candidate	Ideology	Previous result		Gov.	Ref.
Candidacy	Parties and alliances	Leading candidate	Ideology	Vote %	Seats	Gov.	Ref.
UPN	List: Navarrese People's Union (UPN)	Miguel Sanz	Conservatism; Christian democracy Regionalism	35.0%	20	No	
PSN–PSOE	List: Socialist Party of Navarre (PSN–PSOE)	Javier Otano	Social democracy	35.5%	19	No	
HB	List: Popular Unity (HB) – Basque Nationalist Action (EAE/ANV)	Patxi Zabaleta	Basque independence Abertzale left Revolutionary socialism	11.2%	6	No	
EA	List: Basque Solidarity (EA)	Fermín Ciaurriz	Basque nationalism Social democracy	5.5%	3	15	
IU/EB	List: United Left of Navarre (IUN/NEB) – Communist Party of the Basque Country (PCE/EPK) – Socialist Action Party (PASOC) – Republican Left (IR)	Félix Taberna	Socialism; Communism	4.1%	2	No	
CDN	List: Convergence of Democrats of Navarre (CDN)	Juan Cruz Alli	Christian democracy Regionalism	Did not contest		Yes	

== Opinion polls ==
The tables below list opinion polling results in reverse chronological order, showing the most recent first and using the dates when the survey fieldwork was done, as opposed to the date of publication. Where the fieldwork dates are unknown, the date of publication is given instead. The highest percentage figure in each polling survey is displayed with its background shaded in the leading party's colour. If a tie ensues, this is applied to the figures with the highest percentages. The "Lead" column on the right shows the percentage-point difference between the parties with the highest percentages in a poll.

=== Voting intention estimates ===
The table below lists weighted voting intention estimates. Refusals are generally excluded from the party vote percentages, while question wording and the treatment of "don't know" responses and those not intending to vote may vary between polling organisations. When available, seat projections determined by the polling organisations are displayed below (or in place of) the percentages in a smaller font; 26 seats were required for an absolute majority in the Parliament of Navarre.

Color key:

Exit poll

Polling firm/Commissioner	Fieldwork date	Sample size	Turnout	UPN	PSN–PSOE	HB	EA	IU	Batzarre	PNV	CDN	Lead
1995 regional election	28 May 1995	—N/a	68.4	31.3; 17	20.9; 11	9.2; 5	4.6; 2	9.3; 5	2.2; 0	1.0; 0	18.6; 10	10.4
Eco Consulting/RTVE	28 May 1995	?	?	33.8; 18/20	19.1; 10/11	10.0; 4/5	–	11.8; 6/7	–	–	14.0; 7/8	14.7
CIES/Diario de Navarra	12–16 May 1995	1,502	70	33.6; 17/19	20.1; 10/12	9.3; 4/5	3.6; 1/2	11.0; 5/6	1.9; 0	1.7; 0	15.7; 8/9	13.5
Demoscopia/El País	10–15 May 1995	600	?	33.5; 19	17.2; 9	8.3; 4	4.9; 2	13.1; 7	–	0.8; 0	15.5; 9	16.3
CIS (Note: "Preelectoral Autonómicas Navarra (Estudio nº 2170. Abril-Mayo 1995)". CIS (in Spanish). 10 May 1995. Archived from the original on 26 June 2018.)	24 Apr–10 May 1995	500	67.9	29.5	20.9	10.4	3.6	14.3	–	0.6	14.2	8.6
CIES/Diario de Navarra	21–25 Apr 1995	1,201	65	31.8; 17	19.7; 11	8.8; 4	3.6; 2	11.5; 6	1.9; 0	1.5; 0	18.9; 10	12.1
Sigma Dos/El Mundo	13 Mar 1995	?	?	43.7; 24/25	23.4; 12/13	8.8; 4/5	3.2; 1	14.1; 7/8	–	–	–	20.3
CIES/Diario de Navarra	9–13 Dec 1994	504	56	43.0; 23	22.0; 12	9.0; 5	5.0; 2	15.0; 8	–	–	–	21.0
1994 EP election	12 Jun 1994	—N/a	53.6	40.8 (23)	24.8 (13)	10.4 (5)	3.7 (2)	12.8 (7)	–	1.2 (0)	–	16.0
1993 general election	6 Jun 1993	—N/a	73.6	36.1 (20)	34.9 (19)	10.4 (5)	3.7 (2)	8.7 (4)	–	1.1 (0)	–	1.2
1991 regional election	26 May 1991	—N/a	66.7	35.0; 20	33.4; 19	11.2; 6	5.5; 3	4.1; 2	2.4; 0	1.1; 0	–	1.6

=== Voting preferences ===
The table below lists raw, unweighted voting preferences.

Polling firm/Commissioner	Fieldwork date	Sample size	UPN	PSN–PSOE	HB	EA	IU	Batzarre	PNV	CDN	Question	X mark	Lead
1995 regional election (Note: Does not include non-resident citizens.)	28 May 1995	—N/a	21.5	14.3	6.4	3.2	6.4	1.5	0.7	12.7	—N/a	30.8	7.2
CIS	24 Apr–10 May 1995	500	20.0	14.0	7.0	3.0	8.6	–	0.8	9.4	23.6	10.8	6.0
CIS	2–17 Mar 1995	499	22.9	15.1	6.6	0.8	9.2	–	1.2	–	26.5	15.1	7.8
1994 EP election	12 Jun 1994	—N/a	21.9	13.3	5.6	2.0	6.9	–	0.7	–	—N/a	46.0	8.6
1993 general election	6 Jun 1993	—N/a	26.5	25.6	7.7	2.7	6.4	–	0.8	–	—N/a	25.9	0.9
CIS	9–17 Nov 1992	520	13.5	14.4	6.9	3.1	3.1	–	–	–	39.7	17.9	0.9
1991 regional election	26 May 1991	—N/a	23.2	22.2	7.5	3.7	2.7	1.4	0.7	–	—N/a	31.8	1.0

=== Victory preferences ===
The table below lists opinion polling on the victory preferences for each party in the event of a regional election taking place.

Polling firm/Commissioner	Fieldwork date	Sample size	UPN	PSN–PSOE	Other/ None	Question	Lead
CIS	24 Apr–10 May 1995	500	31.6	23.0	–	45.3	8.6
CIS	2–17 Mar 1995	499	37.8	28.5	–	33.7	9.3

=== Victory likelihood ===
The table below lists opinion polling on the perceived likelihood of victory for each party in the event of a regional election taking place.

Polling firm/Commissioner	Fieldwork date	Sample size	UPN	PSN–PSOE	Other/ None	Question	Lead
CIS	24 Apr–10 May 1995	500	51.5	6.8	–	41.7	44.7
CIS	2–17 Mar 1995	499	63.8	7.6	–	28.5	56.2

=== Preferred President ===
The table below lists opinion polling on leader preferences to become president of the Government of Navarre.

Polling firm/Commissioner	Fieldwork date	Sample size				Other/ None/ Not care	Question	Lead
Polling firm/Commissioner	Fieldwork date	Sample size	Sanz UPN	Otano PSN	Alli CDN	Other/ None/ Not care	Question	Lead
CIS	24 Apr–10 May 1995	500	13.9	12.2	47.0	4.0	22.9	33.1
CIS	2–17 Mar 1995	499	11.1	14.5	40.2	9.9	24.3	25.7

== Results ==
← Summary of the 28 May 1995 Parliament of Navarre election results →
Parties and alliances	Popular vote			Seats	
Parties and alliances	Votes	%	±pp	Total	+/−
Navarrese People's Union (UPN)	93,163	31.35	−3.60	17	−3
Socialist Party of Navarre (PSN–PSOE)^{1}	62,021	20.87	−14.61	11	−8
Convergence of Democrats of Navarre (CDN)	55,153	18.56	New	10	+10
United Left (IU/EB)	27,773	9.35	+5.28	5	+3
Popular Unity (HB)	27,404	9.22	−1.98	5	−1
Basque Solidarity (EA)	13,568	4.57	−0.95	2	−1
Assembly (Batzarre)	6,509	2.19	−0.19	0	±0
Nationalists of Navarre (NA)	2,943	0.99	−0.13	0	±0
Platform of Independents of Spain (PIE)	2,041	0.69	New	0	±0
Carlist Party (PC)	843	0.28	−0.21	0	±0
Blank ballots	5,761	1.94	+0.62		
Total	297,179			50	±0
Valid votes	297,179	99.21	−0.03		
Invalid votes	2,366	0.79	+0.03		
Votes cast / turnout	299,545	68.42	+1.71		
Abstentions	138,252	31.58	−1.71		
Registered voters	437,797				
Sources
Footnotes: ^{1} Socialist Party of Navarre results are compared to the combined totals of Socialist Party of Navarre and Basque Country Left in the 1991 election.

Popular vote
UPN	31.35%
PSN–PSOE	20.87%
CDN	18.56%
IU/EB	9.35%
HB	9.22%
EA	4.57%
Batzarre	2.19%
Others	1.96%
Blank ballots	1.94%

Seats
UPN	34.00%
PSN–PSOE	22.00%
CDN	20.00%
IU/EB	10.00%
HB	10.00%
EA	4.00%

== Aftermath ==
=== Government formation ===
Investiture; Nomination of Javier Otano (PSN)
Ballot →	18 July 1995	20 July 1995	22 July 1995
Required majority →	26 out of 50	26 out of 50	Simple
Yes: • PSN (11); • CDN (10); • EA (2)	23 / 50	23 / 50	23 / 50
No: • UPN (17) (16 on 20 Jul); • HB (5)	22 / 50	21 / 50	22 / 50
Abstentions: • IU (5)	5 / 50	5 / 50	5 / 50
Absentees: • UPN (1) (on 20 Jul)	0 / 50	1 / 50	0 / 50

=== 1996 investiture ===
On 19 June 1996, Javier Otano resigned as President of Navarre after judicial investigations uncovered a Swiss bank account in his name and that of his wife, triggering a new investiture process in which Miguel Sanz from UPN was automatically elected on 18 September 1996, being the candidate from the party with the highest number of seats and with the investiture process having failed to elect a regional premier.

Investiture; Nomination of Miguel Sanz (UPN)
Ballot →	16 July 1996	18 July 1996	20 July 1996	22 July 1996
Required majority →	26 out of 50	26 out of 50	Simple	Simple
Yes: • UPN (17)	17 / 50	17 / 50	17 / 50	17 / 50
No: • PSN (11) (10 from 18 Jul); • CDN (10); • IU (5); • HB (5) (on 16 Jul); • EA (2)	33 / 50	27 / 50	27 / 50	27 / 50
Abstentions	0 / 50	0 / 50	0 / 50	0 / 50
Absentees: • HB (5) (from 18 Jul); • PSN (1) (from 18 Jul)	0 / 50	6 / 50	6 / 50	6 / 50

== Bibliography ==
- Ley Orgánica 13/1982, de 10 de agosto, de reintegración y amejoramiento del Régimen Foral de Navarra (Organic Law 13/1982). Official State Gazette (in Spanish). 10 August 1982 [version as of 16 August 1982]. BOE-A-1982-20824.
- Ley Orgánica 5/1985, de 19 de junio, del Régimen Electoral General (Organic Law 5/1985). Official State Gazette (in Spanish). 19 June 1985 [version as of 24 March 1995]. BOE-A-1985-11672.
- Ley Foral 16/1986, de 17 de noviembre, reguladora de las elecciones al Parlamento de Navarra (Foral Law 16/1986). Official State Gazette (in Spanish). 17 November 1986 [version as of 25 March 1991]. BOE-A-1987-1255.
- Decreto Foral 5/1995, de 3 de abril, del Presidente del Gobierno de Navarra, por el que se convocan elecciones al Parlamento de Navarra (Foral Decree 5/1995). Official State Gazette (in Spanish). 3 April 1995. BOE-A-1995-8141.
