= Javier Remírez =

Spanish politician

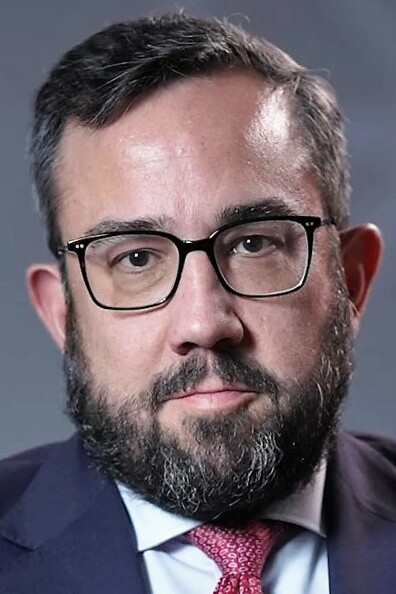

First Vice President of Navarre
- Incumbent
- Assumed office 9 January 2026
- President: María Chivite
- Preceded by: Félix Taberna
- In office 7 August 2019 – 18 August 2023
- President: María Chivite
- Preceded by: Manuel Ayerdi
- Succeeded by: Félix Taberna

Minister of the Presidency and Equality of Navarre
- Incumbent
- Assumed office 9 January 2026
- President: María Chivite
- Preceded by: Félix Taberna

Spokesperson of the Government of Navarre
- Incumbent
- Assumed office 9 January 2026
- President: María Chivite
- Preceded by: Amparo López
- In office 7 August 2019 – 7 September 2022
- President: María Chivite
- Preceded by: María Solana
- Succeeded by: Elma Saiz

Minister of the Presidency, Equality, Civil Service and Interior of Navarre
- In office 7 August 2019 – 18 August 2023
- President: María Chivite
- Preceded by: María José Beaumont
- Succeeded by: Félix Taberna

Personal details
- Born: Javier Remírez Apesteguía; 5 April 1975 (age 51) Pamplona, Navarre
- Party: Socialist Party of Navarre

Javier Remírez Apesteguía (born 5 April 1975) is a Navarrese politician, who served as First Vice President of Navarre and Minister of the Presidency, Equality, Civil Service and Interior from 2019 to 2023, and again since 2026.
