= Amparo López =

Spanish politician (born 1971)

Spokesperson of the Government of Navarre
- In office 3 October 2023 – 9 January 2026
- President: María Chivite
- Preceded by: Félix Taberna
- Succeeded by: Javier Remírez

Minister of Interior, Civil Service and Justice of Navarre
- In office 18 August 2023 – 9 January 2026
- President: María Chivite
- Preceded by: Javier Remírez; Eduardo Santos
- Succeeded by: Inma Jurío

Personal details
- Born: Amparo López Antelo; 1971 (age 54–55) San Sebastián, Basque Country
- Party: Socialist Party of Navarre

Amparo López Antelo (born 1971) is a Basque and Navarrese politician, Minister of Interior, Civil Service and Justice of Navarre from 2023 to 2026.
