= Manu Ayerdi =

Basque politician (born 1967)

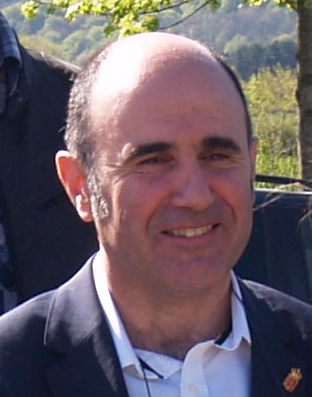
- Aierdi in April 2016

Minister of Economic Development and Business of Navarre (Note: Minister for Economic Development from July 2015 to August 2019. Minister of Economic Development and Business since August 2019.)
- In office 23 July 2015 – 4 February 2021
- President: Uxue Barkos; María Chivite
- Succeeded by: Mikel Irujo

First Vice President of Navarre
- In office 23 July 2015 – 6 August 2019
- President: Uxue Barkos
- Preceded by: Lourdes Goicoechea
- Succeeded by: Javier Remírez

Member of the Parliament of Navarre
- In office 15 June 2011 – 27 July 2015
- Succeeded by: Consuelo Satrustegi
- Incumbent
- Assumed office 19 June 2019

Personal details
- Born: Manuel Ayerdi Olaizola; 13 January 1967 (age 59) San Sebastián, Basque Country, Spain
- Party: Basque Nationalist Party
- Other political affiliations: Geroa Bai
- Education: University of Deusto
- Occupation: Economist, Politician

Manuel Ayerdi Olaizola (born 13 January 1967) is a Spanish economist, politician, Minister of Economic Development and Business of Navarre and a member of the Parliament of Navarre. He was previously First Vice President of Navarre.

== Early life ==
Aierdi was born on 13 January 1967 in San Sebastián (Donostia), Basque Country, Spain. In 1989, he received a degree in economics and business administration from the San Sebastián campus of the University of Deusto. He has a post-graduate degree (1996) in financial management in SMEs.

== Career ==
Aierdi joined the marketing department of information and communications technology company Ibermática in 1989. He was economic and financial director of Alcer, a construction company, from 1991 to 2001, as well as director of quality systems, prevention and environment at Alcer. Between 2001 and 2012, he was director of economic-financial and corporate services at Arian and the company's legal representative in China between 2004 and 2011.

In the 1990s, Aierdi taught human resources management models at the University of Deusto's Faculty of Economic and Business Sciences.

Aierdi has been affiliated with the Basque Nationalist Party (EAJ) since 2003 and was an executive member of its Navarrese branch, the Napar Buru Batzarra (NBB), from 2008 to 2012. He was president of NBB from 2012 to 2015.

Aierdi contested the 2011 regional election in Navarre as an Nafarroa Bai electoral alliance candidate and was elected to the Parliament of Navarre. He was re-elected at the 2015 regional election as a Geroa Bai candidate.

In July 2015, he was appointed First Vice President of Navarre and Minister of Economic Development by President Uxue Barkos. He resigned from parliament on 27 July 2015. In his ministerial role, Aierdi has been president of various state-owned companies including Sodena, Cener and Naitec. He came under criticism after Sodena loaned €3 million to Davalor Salud, a company that was in financial difficulties and subsequently went into administration.

Aierdi was re-elected at the 2019 regional election. In August 2019, he was appointed Minister of Economic Development and Business by President María Chivite.

== Electoral history ==
Electoral history of Manu Aierdi
Election	Constituency	Party	Alliance	No.	Result
2011 regional	Navarre	Basque Nationalist Party	Nafarroa Bai	4	Elected
2015 regional	Navarre	Basque Nationalist Party	Geroa Bai	2	Elected
2019 regional	Navarre	Basque Nationalist Party	Geroa Bai	5	Elected
