= Itziar Gómez =

Spanish politician (born 1965)

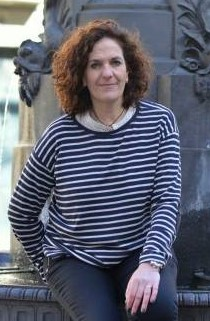

Minister of Rural Development and Environment of Navarre
- Incumbent
- Assumed office 7 August 2019
- President: María Chivite
- Preceded by: Isabel Elizalde

Personal details
- Born: Itziar Gómez López; 29 January 1965 (age 61) Pamplona, Navarre
- Party: Geroa Socialverdes (2020–present)
- Other political affiliations: Independent (until 2020)

Itziar Gómez López (born 29 January 1965) is a Navarrese politician, Minister of Rural Development and Environment of Navarre since August 2019.
