= Isabel Elizalde =

Navarrese politician

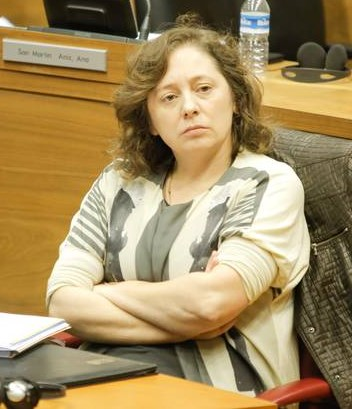

Minister of Rural Development, Local Administration and Environment of Navarre
- In office 23 July 2015 – 7 August 2019
- President: Uxue Barkos
- Preceded by: Javier Esparza
- Succeeded by: Itziar Gómez

Personal details
- Born: María Isabel Elizalde Arretxea; November 13, 1964 (age 61) Pamplona, Navarre
- Party: Independent

María Isabel Elizalde Arretxea (born 13 November 1964) is a Navarrese politician, Minister of Rural Development, Local Administration and Environment of Navarre from July 2015 to August 2019.
