= José Luis Arasti =

Spanish politician

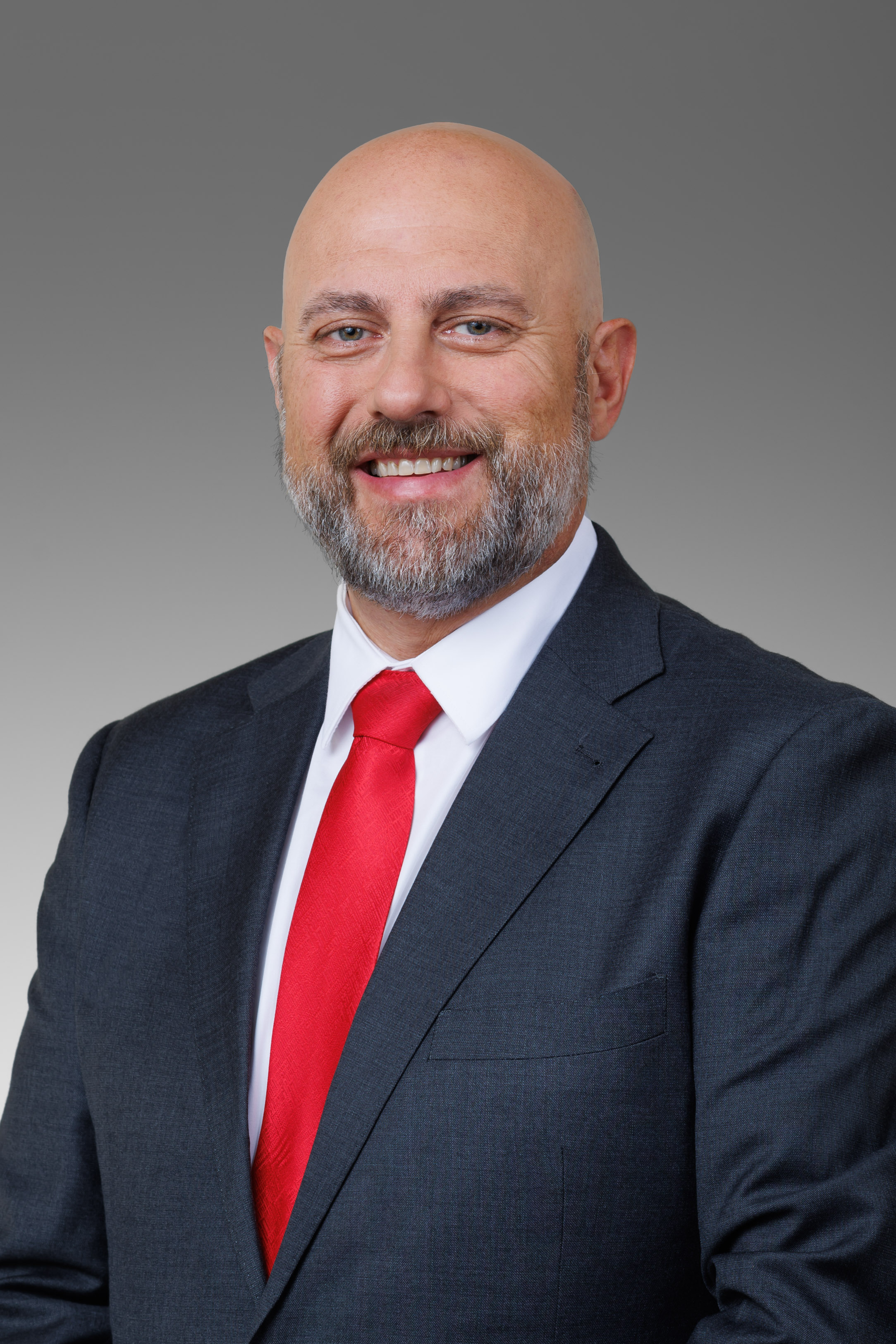

Minister of Economy and Finance of Navarre
- Incumbent
- Assumed office 30 August 2023
- President: María Chivite
- Preceded by: Juan Cruz Cigudosa (acting)

Personal details
- Born: José Luis Arasti Pérez; 26 August 1971 (age 54) Milagro, Navarre
- Party: Socialist Party of Navarre

José Luis Arasti Pérez (born 26 August 1971) is a Navarrese politician, Minister of Economy and Finance of Navarre since August 2023.
