= Indurain (surname) =

Indurain is a surname. Notable people with the surname include:

- Miguel Induráin (born 1964), retired Spanish road racing cyclist
- Prudencio Induráin (born 1968), Spanish retired road racing cyclist
- Rafael Gurrea Induráin (1940–2021), Spanish politician
- Santos Induráin (born 1959), Navarrese politician

== Other ==
- GP Miguel Induráin, Spanish one-day road bicycle race
