= Carlos Gimeno =

Navarrese politician

Minister of Education of Navarre
- Incumbent
- Assumed office 7 August 2019
- President: María Chivite
- Preceded by: María Solana

Personal details
- Born: Carlos Gimeno Gurpegui; 1965 (age 60–61) San Adrián, Navarre
- Party: Socialist Party of Navarre

Carlos Gimeno Gurpegui (born 1965) is a Navarrese politician and the Minister of Education of Navarre since August 2019.
