= Óscar Chivite =

Spanish politician (born 1967)

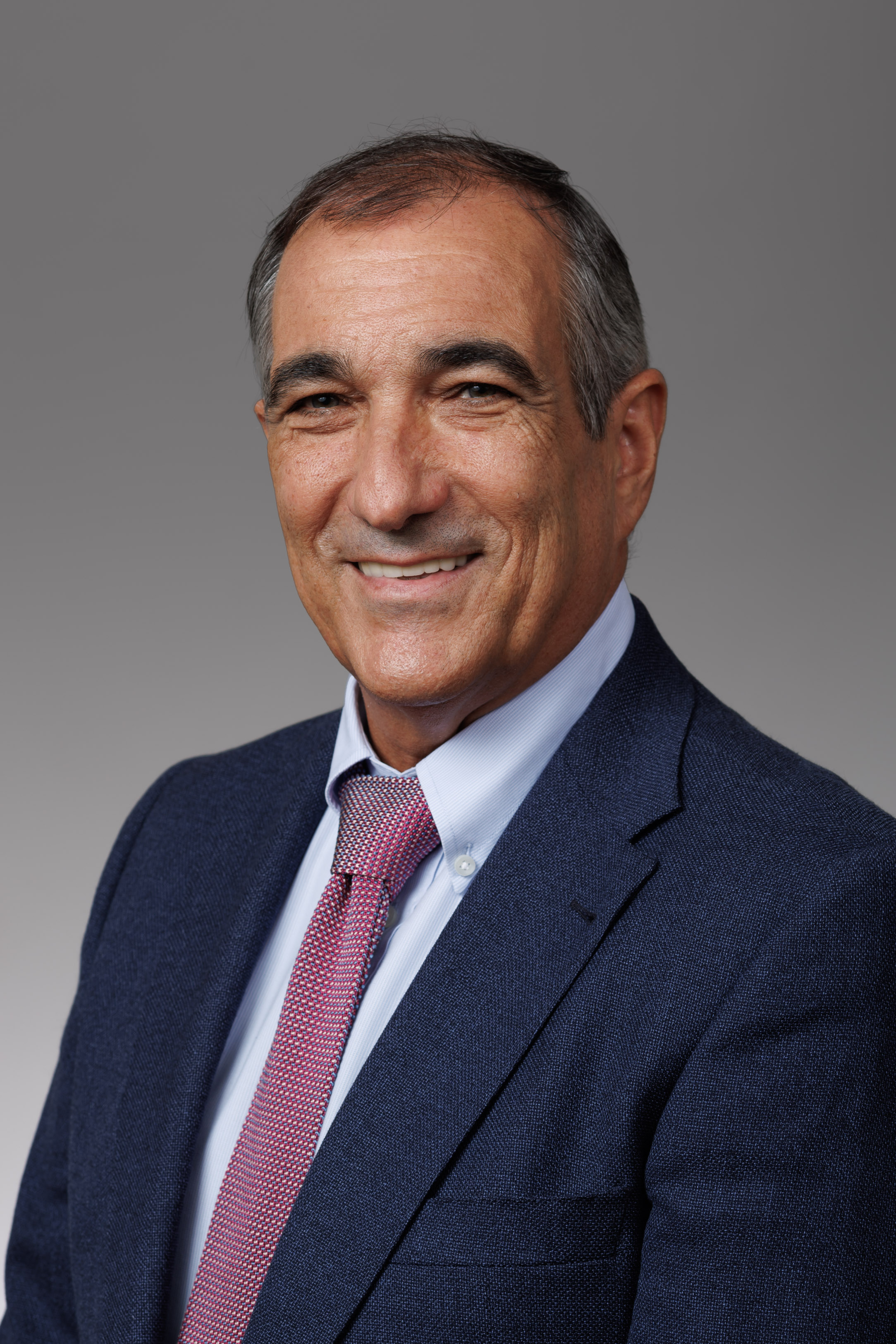

Minister of Territorial Cohesion of Navarre
- Incumbent
- Assumed office 18 August 2023
- President: María Chivite
- Preceded by: Bernardo Ciriza

Personal details
- Born: Óscar Chivite Cornago; 1967 (age 58–59) Cintruénigo, Navarre
- Party: Socialist Party of Navarre

Óscar Chivite Cornago (born 1967) is a Navarrese politician, Minister of Territorial Cohesion of Navarre since August 2023.
