= Esnaola =

Esnaola is a surname. Notable people with the surname include:

- José Ramón Esnaola (born 1946), Spanish footballer
- Josu Esnaola (born 1986), Spanish footballer
- Juan Pedro Esnaola (1808–1878), Argentine composer
- Rebeca Esnaola (born 1975), Navarrese politician
