= Sergio Sayas =

Spanish politician (born 1979)

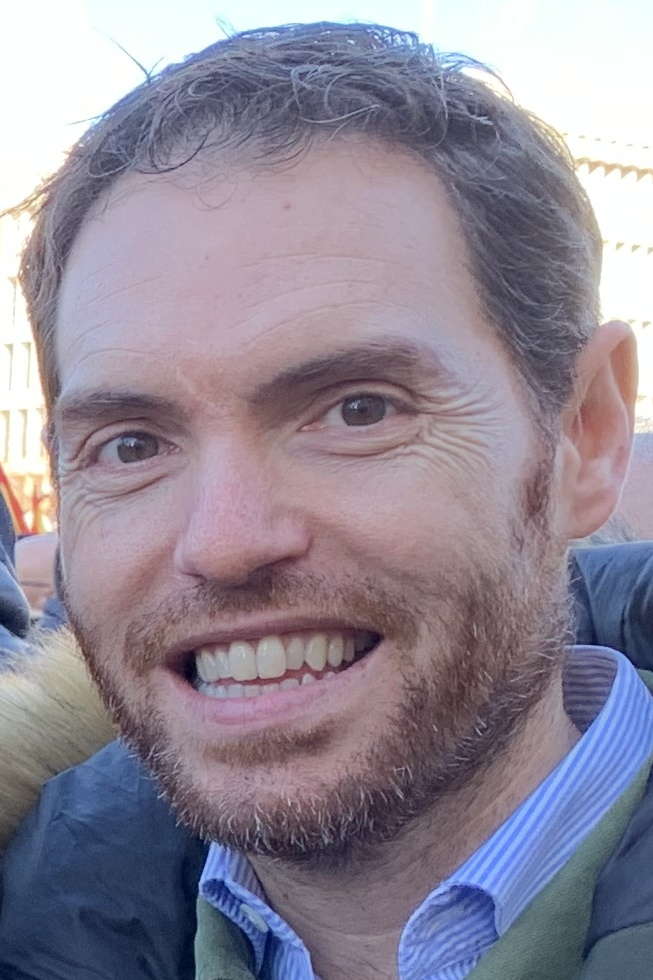

Sergio Sayas López (born 6 July 1979) is a Spanish politician who has served in the Congress of Deputies representing Navarre since the April 2019 election. Previously, he served in the Parliament of Navarre from 2007 to 2019. He was a member of the Navarrese People's Union (UPN) until his expulsion in 2022, after which he established the Navarre Platform (PN). After allying with the People's Party of Navarre in 2023, he officially joined it in 2024.

== Biography ==
Born in Buñuel, Navarre, Sayas graduated in Hispanic Philology from the University of Navarra and obtained a master's degree in Business Management from its IESE Business School. As a member of the Navarrese People's Union (UPN), he served on the town council in Berriozar from 2003 to 2011, and led the party's youth wing from 2006 to 2010. At the age of 27 in the 2007 elections, he was elected to the Parliament of Navarre.

Ahead of the April 2019 Spanish general election, the UPN formed the Navarra Suma coalition with Citizens and the People's Party of Navarre (PPN). Sayas was chosen to lead their list, despite his history of criticising the other two member parties. The coalition gained two seats in the Congress of Deputies, and repeated in the November election.

In June 2020, Sayas ran for president of the UPN against incumbent Javier Esparza, losing with 41.7% of the votes.

Sayas is an opponent of Basque nationalism in Navarre, particularly the Abertzale left parties Batasuna and EH Bildu. In November 2021, he opposed the expansion of the Basque language children's television channel ETB 3 into Navarre, accusing it of indoctrination.

In February 2022, Sayas and fellow Congressman Carlos García Adanero disobeyed instruction by Esparza and voted against labour reform. They were expelled from UPN for two-and-a-half years. In June, the pair founded the Navarre Platform (PN). In January 2023, it was announced that PN and the PPN would contest the upcoming local and regional elections together.

== Personal life ==
Sayas is openly gay. In 2009, as youth leader of the UPN, he vocally disagreed with the party's opposition to same-sex marriage.
