= Begoña Alfaro =

Spanish politician

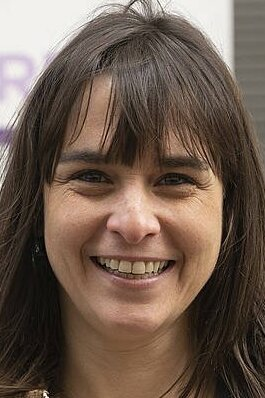

Third Vice President of the Government of Navarre
- Incumbent
- Assumed office 18 August 2023
- President: María Chivite
- Preceded by: Office established

Minister of Housing, Youth and Migration Policies of Navarre
- Incumbent
- Assumed office 18 August 2023
- President: María Chivite
- Preceded by: Office established

Personal details
- Born: Begoña Alfaro García; 4 March 1983 (age 43) Terrassa, Catalonia
- Party: Podemos

Begoña Alfaro García (born 1982) is a Spanish politician from Navarre, serving as Third Vice President and Minister of Housing, Youth and Migration Policies of Navarre since August 2023.
