= Mari Carmen Maeztu =

Navarrese politician (born 1962)

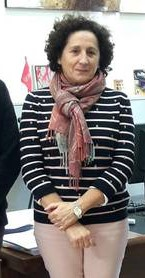

Minister of Social Rights of Navarre
- Incumbent
- Assumed office 7 August 2019
- President: María Chivite
- Preceded by: Miguel Laparra

Personal details
- Born: María Carmen Maeztu Villafranca; 1962 (age 63–64) Valtierra, Navarre
- Party: Socialist Party of Navarre

María Carmen Maeztu Villafranca (born 1962) is a Navarrese politician who has served as Minister of Social Rights of Navarre since August 2019.
