= Santos Induráin =

Spanish politician (born 1959)

Minister of Health of Navarre
- In office 7 August 2019 – 18 August 2023
- President: María Chivite
- Preceded by: Fernando Domínguez Cunchillos
- Succeeded by: Fernando Domínguez Cunchillos

Personal details
- Born: María Santos Induráin Orduna; 1959 (age 66–67) Uztárroz, Navarre
- Party: Independent

María Santos Induráin Orduna (born 1959) is a Navarrese politician, Minister of Health of Navarre since August 2019.
