= José María Aierdi =

Spanish politician (born 1958)

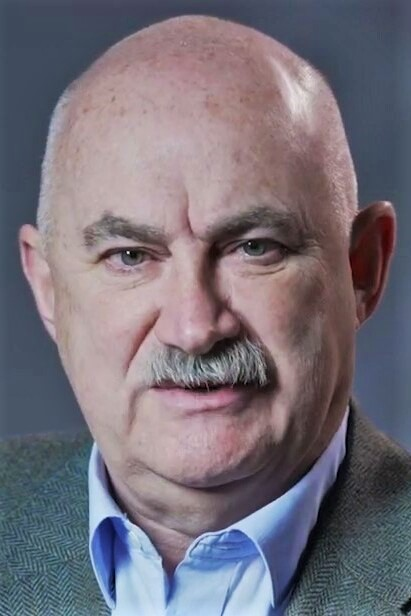
- José María Aierdi in 2023.

Second Vice President of Navarre
- In office 7 August 2019 – 18 August 2023
- President: María Chivite
- Preceded by: Miguel Laparra
- Succeeded by: Ana Ollo

Minister of Territorial Planning, Housing, Landscape and Strategic Projects of Navarre
- In office 7 August 2019 – 18 August 2023
- President: María Chivite

Member of the Parliament of Navarre
- In office 2 July 1999 – 1 April 2003

Second Secretary of the Parliament of Navarre
- In office 2 July 1999 – 1 April 2003
- Preceded by: Alberto Catalán
- Succeeded by: Félix Taberna

Mayor of Lekunberri
- In office 1984–2015

Personal details
- Born: José María Aierdi Fernández de Barrena; 1958 (age 67–68) Etxauri, Navarre, Spain
- Party: Basque Nationalist Party
- Other political affiliations: Geroa Bai

José María Aierdi Fernández de Barrena (Basque: Jose Mari Aierdi; born 1958) is a Spanish politician, Second Vice President of Navarre and Minister of Territorial Planning, Housing, Landscape and Strategic Projects of Navarre. He was previously a member of the Parliament of Navarre and mayor of Lekunberri.

== Early life ==
Aierdi was born in 1958 in Etxauri, Navarre. He has a diploma in basic general education.

== Career ==
Aierdi was one of the founders of the Cooperativa Napar Bideak and the Asociación de Alimentos Artesanos de Navarra. He was in charge of the Sociedad Agraria de Transformación Bikain until 2015. He was a founder and president of the Consorcio Turístico del Plazaola from 1994 to 2006. He was president of the Cederna-Garalur local development association from 1991 to 1999 and from 2011 to 2015. Since 2015, he has been managing director of Nasuvinsa (Navarra de Suelo y Vivienda S.A.) and a manager of CAT (Ciudad Agroalimentaria de Tudela S.A.).

Aierdi was mayor of Lekunberri from 1984 to 2015. He contested the 1999 regional election in Navarre as a Basque Solidarity–Basque Nationalist Party electoral alliance candidate and was elected to the Parliament of Navarre. He was second secretary during the 5th Parliament.

In August 2019, Aierdi was appointed Second Vice President of Navarre and Minister of Territorial Planning, Housing, Landscape and Strategic Projects by President María Chivite.

== Electoral history ==
Electoral history of José Mari Aierdi
Election	Constituency	Party	Alliance	No.	Result
1995 local	Lekunberri	Basque Nationalist Party	Lekunberriko Taldea		Elected
1999 local	Lekunberri	Basque Nationalist Party	Lekunberriko Taldea	1	Elected
1999 regional	Navarre	Basque Nationalist Party	Basque Solidarity–Basque Nationalist Party	2	Elected
2003 local	Lekunberri	Basque Nationalist Party	Lekunberriko Taldea	1	Elected
2007 local	Lekunberri	Basque Nationalist Party	Lekunberriko Taldea	1	Elected
2011 local	Lekunberri	Basque Nationalist Party	Lekunberriko Taldea	1	Elected
