= María José Beaumont =

Navarrese politician

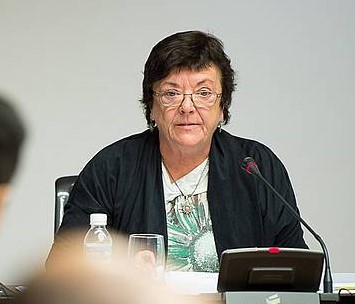

Minister of the Presidency, Civil Service, Interior and Justice of Navarre
- In office 23 July 2015 – 7 August 2019
- President: Uxue Barkos
- Preceded by: Javier Morrás
- Succeeded by: Javier Remírez

Personal details
- Born: María José Beaumont Aristu; 1956 (age 69–70) Artieda (Urraúl Bajo), Navarre
- Party: Independent

María José Beaumont Aristu (born 1956) is a Navarrese politician, Minister of the Presidency, Civil Service, Interior and Justice of Navarre from July 2015 to August 2019.
