= Juan Cruz Cigudosa =

Spanish researcher (born 1964)

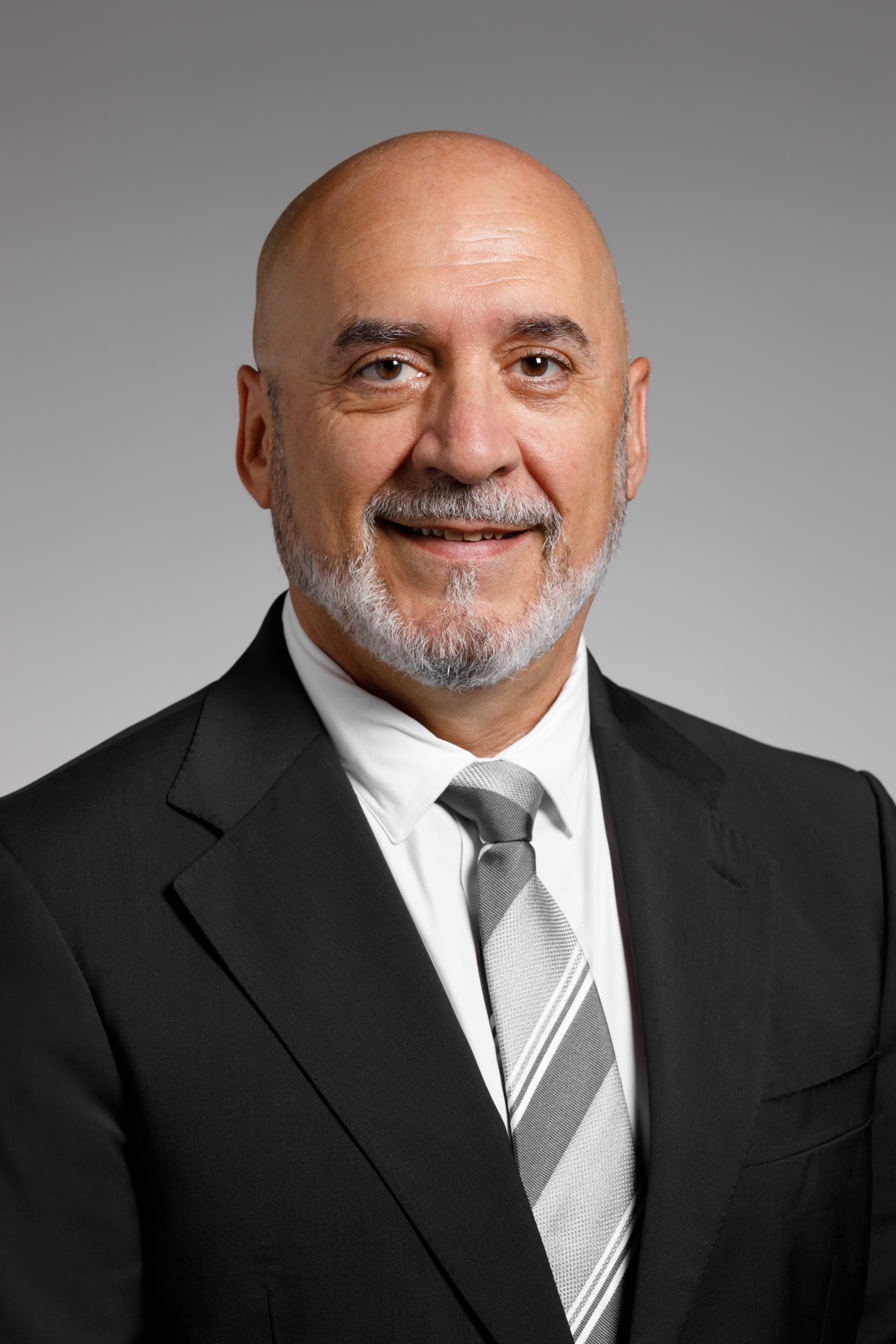

Secretary of State for Science, Innovation and Universities
- Incumbent
- Assumed office 8 December 2023
- Preceded by: Office re-established (Previously, Ángeles Heras Caballero)

Minister of University, Innovation and Digital Transformation of Navarre
- In office 7 August 2019 – 5 December 2023
- President: María Chivite
- Preceded by: Office established
- Succeeded by: Patricia Fanlo Mateo

Personal details
- Born: Juan Cruz Cigudosa García; 1964 (age 61–62) San Adrián, Spain
- Party: Socialist Party of Navarre

Juan Cruz Cigudosa García (born 1964) is a Spanish politician serving as Secretary of State for Science, Innovation and Universities since 2023. Previously, he was Minister of University, Innovation and Digital Transformation of Navarre since August 2019.
