= Félix Taberna =

Spanish politician, sociologist (born 1961)

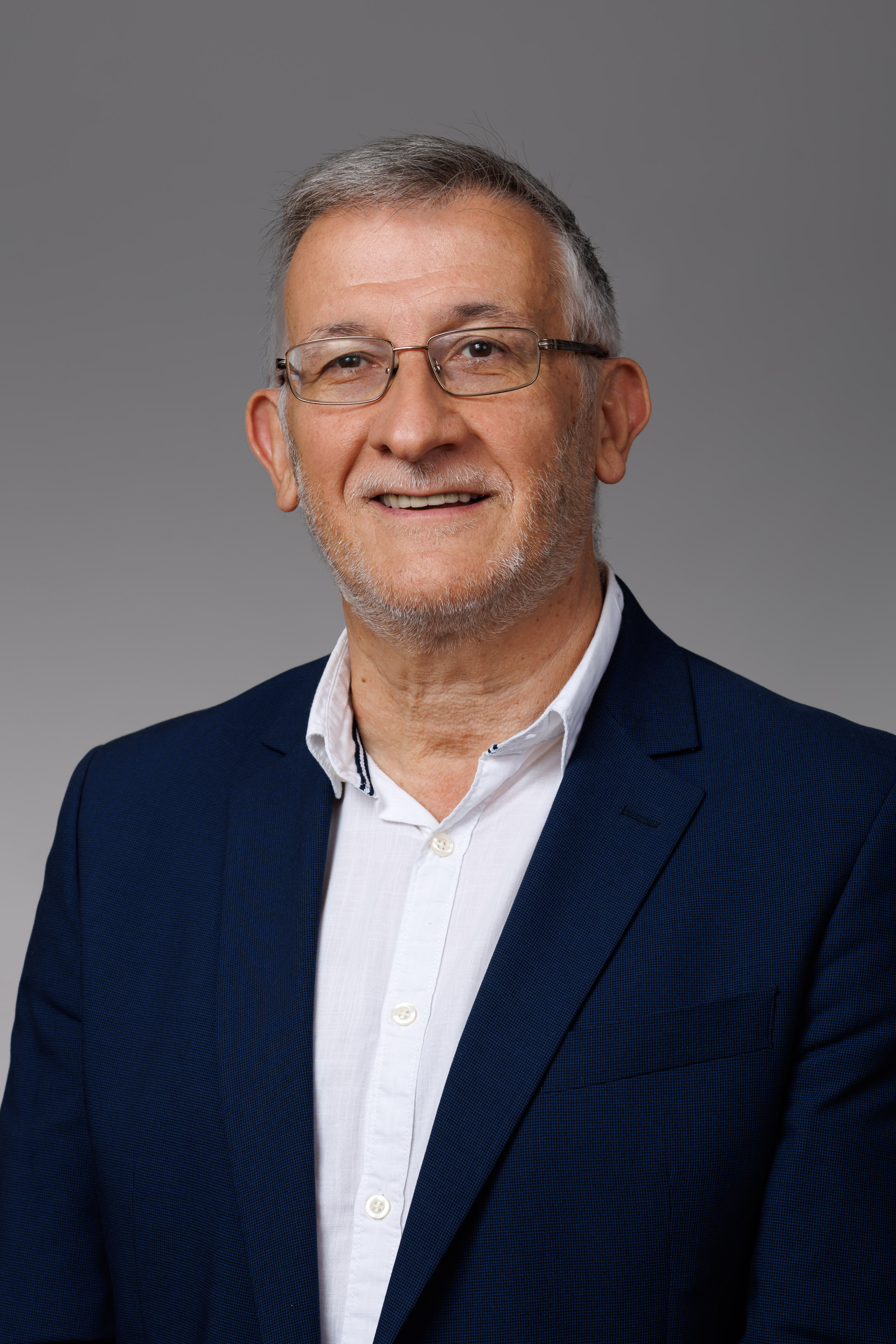

First Vice President of Navarre
- In office 18 August 2023 – 9 January 2026
- President: María Chivite
- Preceded by: Javier Remírez
- Succeeded by: Javier Remírez

Minister of the Presidency and Equality of Navarre
- In office 18 August 2023 – January 2026
- President: María Chivite
- Preceded by: Javier Remírez
- Succeeded by: Javier Remírez

Spokesperson of the Government of Navarre
- In office 18 August 2023 – 3 October 2023
- President: María Chivite
- Preceded by: Javier Remírez
- Succeeded by: Amparo López

Personal details
- Born: Félix Taberna Monzón; 18 December 1961 (age 64) Marcilla, Navarre
- Party: Socialist Party of Navarre

Félix Taberna Monzón (born 18 December 1961) is a Navarrese politician, who served as First Vice President and Minister of the Presidency and Equality of Navarre from 2023 to 2026.
