= Javier Otano =

Spanish politician

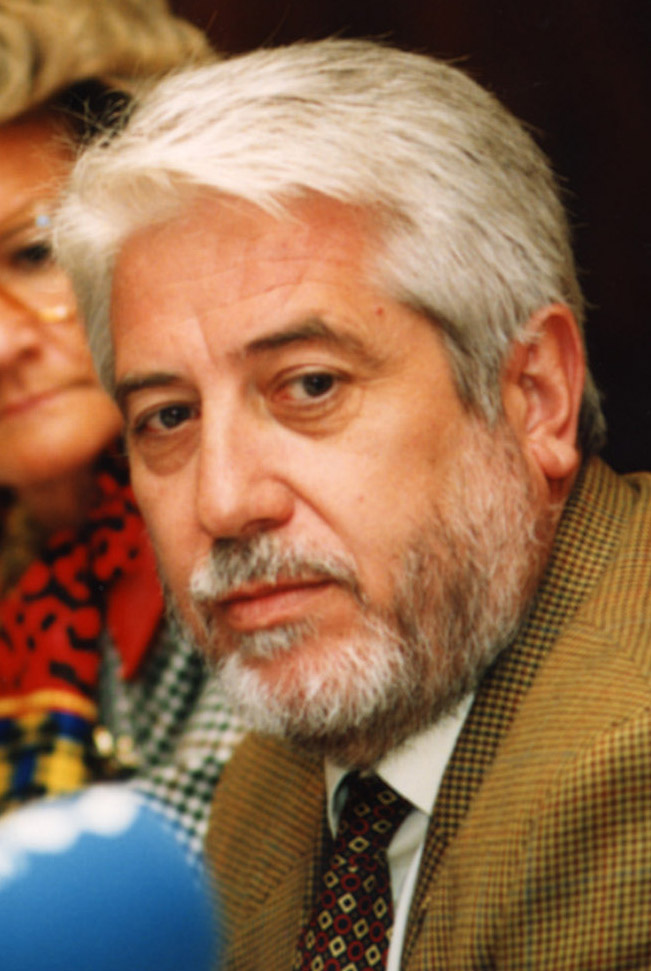

6th President of the Government of Navarre
- In office 3 July 1995 – 19 June 1996
- Preceded by: Juan Cruz Alli
- Succeeded by: Juan Cruz Alli

Secretary-General of the PSN-PSOE
- In office 20 June 1994 – 20 June 1996
- Preceded by: Gabriel Urralburu
- Succeeded by: Juan José Lizarbe

Personal details
- Born: Javier Otano Cid; 6 November 1946 (age 79) Tudela, Navarre, Spain
- Party: Socialist Party of Navarre

Javier Otano Cid (born 6 November 1946) is a Spanish politician and former President of Navarre between 1995 and 1996.
