= Fernando Domínguez Cunchillos =

Spanish politician (born 1953)

Fernando Domínguez
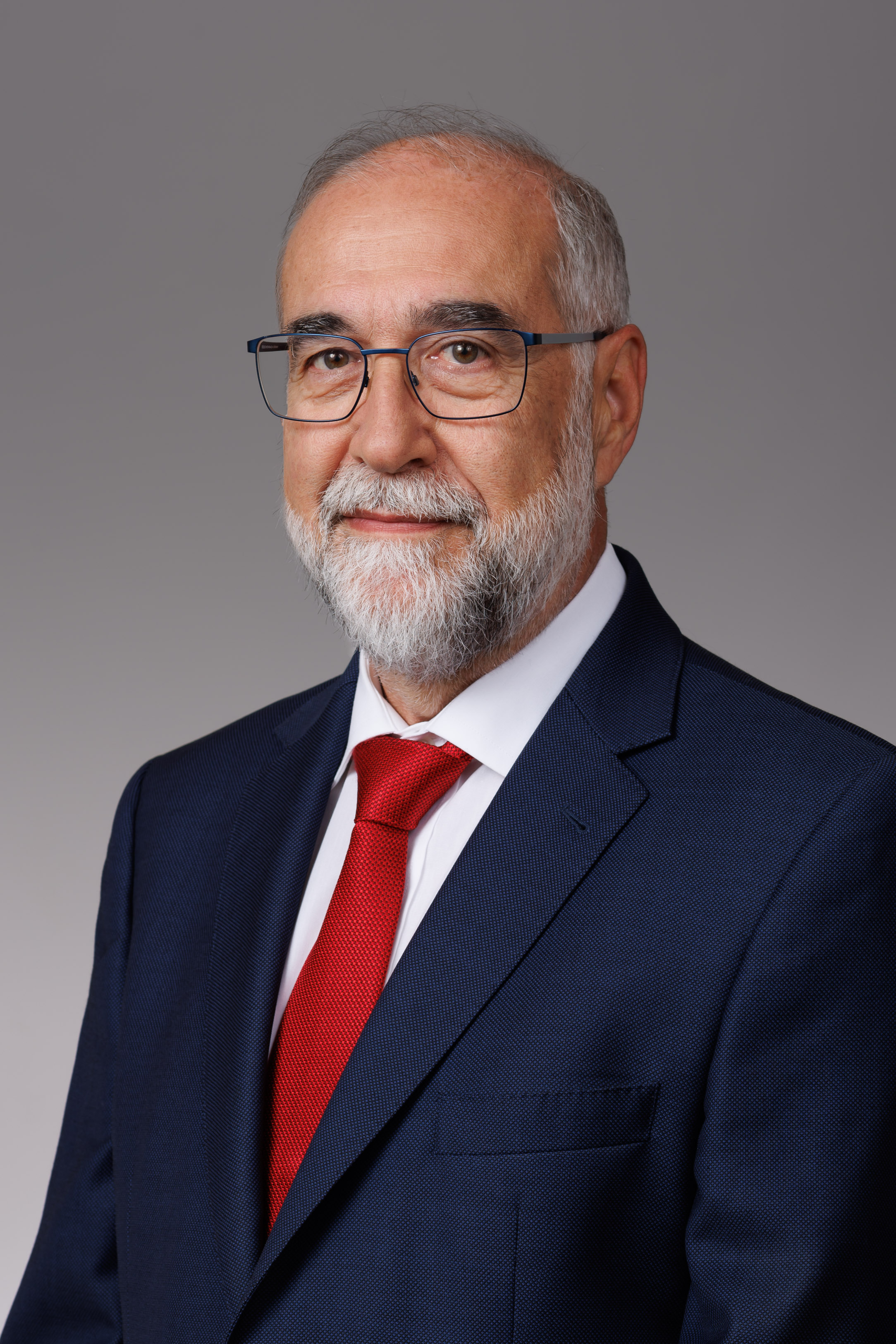
- Fernando Domínguez Cunchillos

Minister of Health of Navarre
- In office 23 July 2015 – 7 August 2019
- President: Uxue Barkos
- Preceded by: Marta Vera Janín
- Succeeded by: Santos Induráin

Personal details
- Born: Fernando Domínguez Cunchillos; June 10, 1953 (age 73) Gallur, Aragon
- Party: Independent

Fernando Domínguez Cunchillos (born 10 June 1953) is a Navarrese politician, Minister of Health of Navarre from July 2015 to August 2019.
