= Mikel Irujo =

Spanish politician (born 1972)

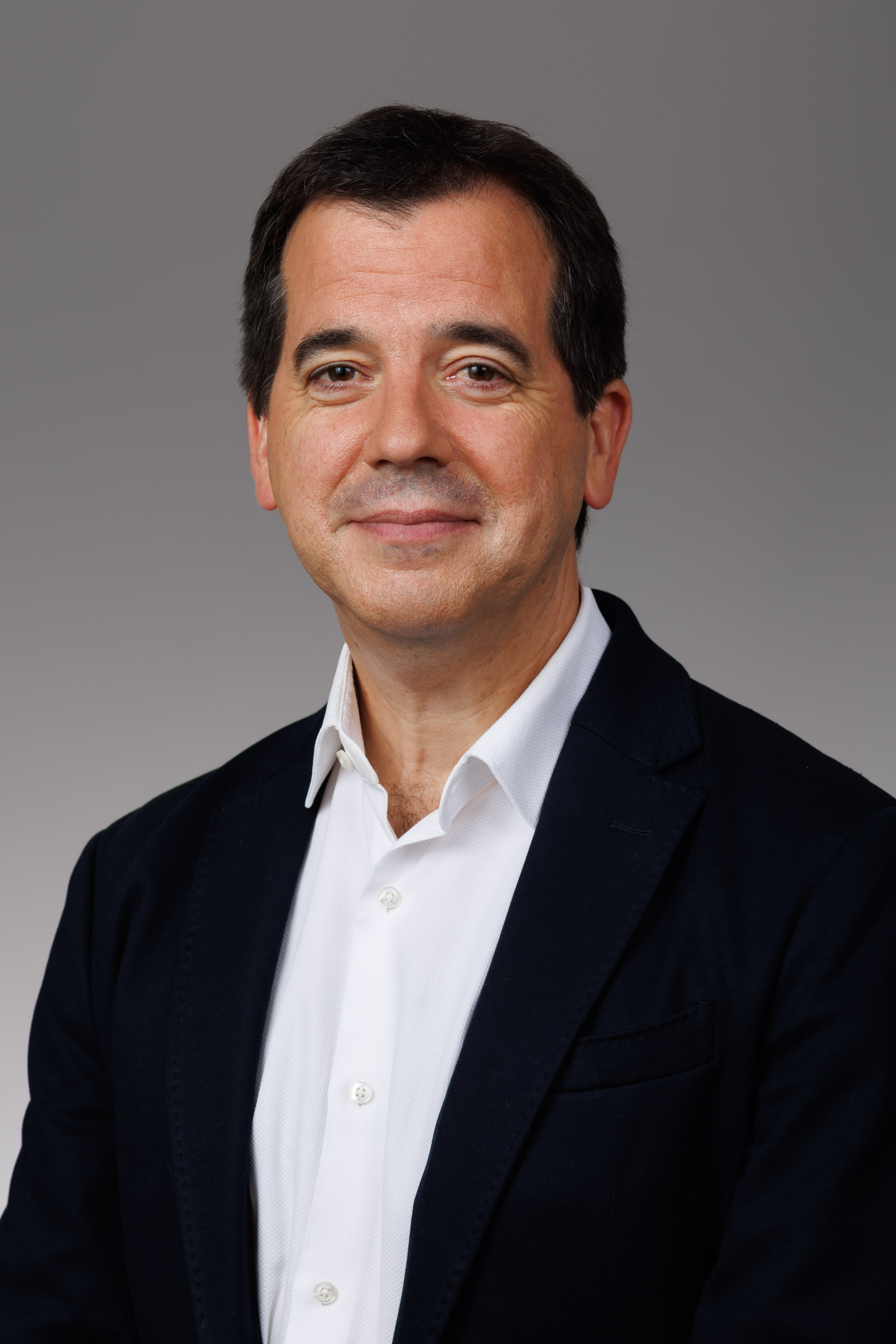

Minister of Economic and Business Development of Navarre
- Incumbent
- Assumed office 4 February 2021
- President: María Chivite
- Preceded by: Manuel Ayerdi

Personal details
- Born: Mikel Irujo Amezaga; 6 October 1972 (age 54) Caracas, Venezuela
- Party: Basque Nationalist Party
- Other political affiliations: Geroa Bai

Mikel Irujo Amezaga (born 6 October 1972) is a Spanish politician, Minister of Economic and Business Development of Navarre since February 2021.
