= Javier Esparza (politician) =

Spanish politician (born 1970)

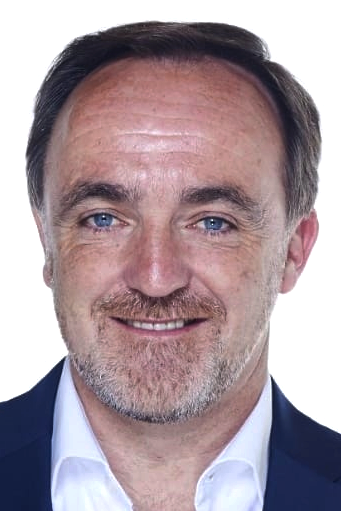
Esparza in 2019

José Javier Esparza Abaurrea (born 20 July 1970) is a Spanish politician of the Navarrese People's Union (UPN). He became the president of the party in 2015, the same year that he entered the Parliament of Navarre. He led the UPN until 2024.

== Biography ==
Born in Pamplona, Esparza graduated in pedagogy from the University of Navarra and has a master's degree in Public Management from the Public University of Navarre. He began teaching in a primary school in 1996.

From 1999 to 2007, Esparza was mayor of Agoitz. For the next four years, he was the managing director of the Navarrese Institute of Sport, then of the Navarrese Employment Service. In June 2012, he was named Minister of Rural Development, Environment and Local Administration in the Government of Navarre.

Esparza became a member of the Navarrese People's Union (UPN) executive committee in 2013. In November 2014, he received 61% of the votes to lead the party in the 2015 Navarrese regional election. In those elections, his party was the most voted but lost four seats, losing power for the first time in 19 years.

In September 2015, Esparza was elected UPN president with 57% of the votes. He led the Navarra Suma coalition with the People's Party of Navarre and Citizens in the 2019 Navarrese regional election, coming first with 20 seats – three more than the sum of its parts four years earlier – but again did not form government.

In June 2020, Esparza survived a leadership challenge from the UPN's leader in the Congress of Deputies, Sergio Sayas (58.2% to 41.8%). In February 2022, he expelled Sayas and the party's only other congressman Carlos García Adanero from the party for disobeying orders and voting against labour reform.
