= Rebeca Esnaola =

Spanish politician (born 1975)

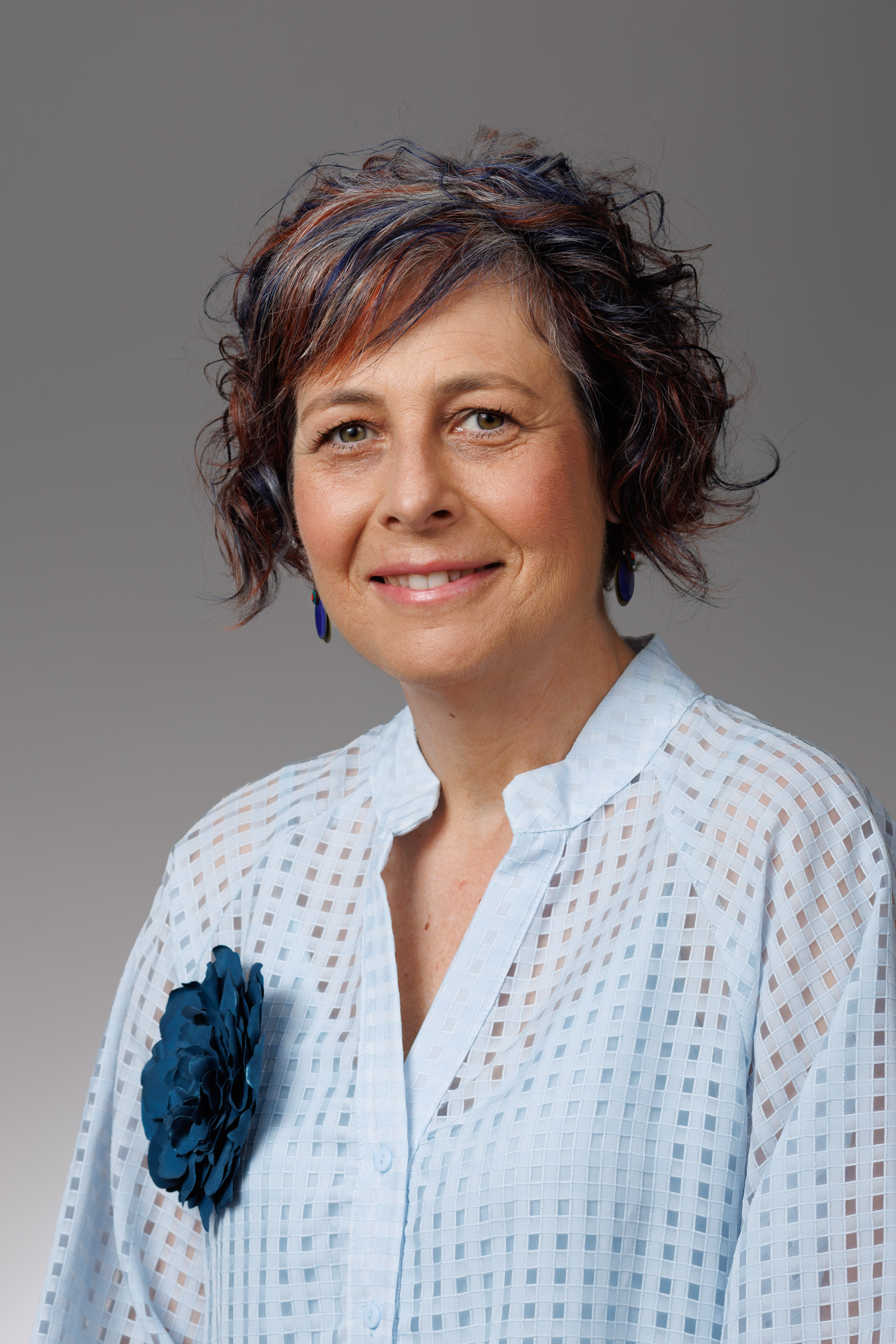
- Esnaola in 2023

Minister of Culture and Sports of Navarre
- Incumbent
- Assumed office 7 August 2019
- President: María Chivite
- Preceded by: Ana Herrera

Personal details
- Born: Rebeca Esnaola Bermejo; 1975 (age 50–51) Pamplona, Navarre
- Party: Independent

Rebeca Esnaola Bermejo (born 1975) is a Navarrese politician who has served as Minister of Culture and Sports of Navarre since August 2019.
