= San Adrián =

Town and municipality in northern Spain

Coordinates: 42°20′01″N 1°56′07″W

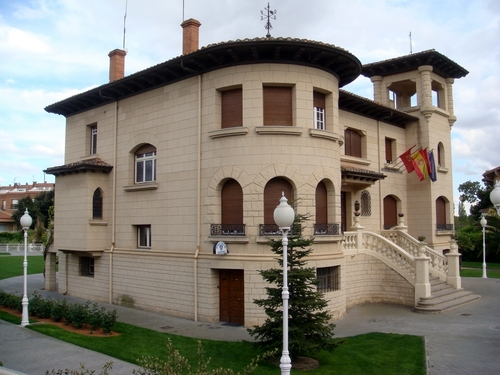

San Adrián is a town and municipality located in the province and autonomous community of Navarre, northern Spain. There was an ancient monastery (or parish church) dedicated to San Adrián y la Virgen de la Palma there, after which the village is named.

== Flag ==
The flag of San Adrian has the following description: rectangular cloth with sides in a ratio of 2:3. Red, with the coat of arms of San Adrian in the center.

== Coat of arms ==
The coat of arms of San Adrian has the following emblem:

Red shield and a golden palm ending in a fleur-de-lis of the same metal added at its base, an eight-point star and a rotated, silver crescent and above those, two castles with two golden towers and a window filled with blue.

The palm is a reminder of the ancient name of the village, which was San Adrian de las Palmas, or Saint Adrian of the Palms.

== Physical Geography ==
=== Location ===
San Adrian is located in the southeastern part of Navarre, in Ribera Alta, one of the sub-zones of Navarre. San Adrian is on the left bank of the Ebro River, forming a border with another autonomous community, La Rioja, which it is connected to through a bridge which joins it with Calahorra.

Its municipal territory has a surface area of 20.91 kilometers squared and is bordered to the north by the province of Andosilla, to the south by the town of Azagra, to the east by the town of Peralta, and to the west by the autonomous community of La Rioja. It is located 75 kilometers from the capital of the community, Pamplona.

=== Terrain and Hydrology ===
The town is located between two rivers, the Ebro and its tributary the Ega (which is why its inhabitants are known as “aguachinaos,” or “the flooded”). Wide bands of flood plains stretch between these two rivers. A network of canals and irrigation channels distributes water for irrigation while the little dry land that exists is used primarily for growing asparagus.

=== Climate ===
The climate is temperate, with characteristics of the continental Mediterranean climate of the northern half of Spain. Infrequently, however, the area reaches climate extremes, including freezes and temperatures which can drop to -6 °C (around 21 °F) in winter and even spring. In the summer, high temperatures can reach 38 °C, approximately 100 °F, in the shade. The dominant winds are the Bochorno (hot) and the Cierzo (cold).

== History ==
=== Early Ages ===
It is believed that the Romans who passed through this land for military strategy built a fortress here.

=== Middle Ages ===
The town emerged from an initial building that, according to evidence, was a monastery in honor of Saint Adrian. This monastery later became a parochial church. In this building, relics were collected that, according to legend, Queen Urraca donated to her abbot after recovering her eyesight by praying with great devotion to the saint. This legend gave rise to the patron festivals of Saint Adrian, called “las fiestas de las Santas Reliquias” or the festivals of the Holy Relics, which are celebrated July 24.

=== Contemporary Ages ===
After the eruption of liberalism in the 19th century, the marquisate ceased to have importance. In an economic aspect, however, its impact was notable until the 20th century, when the family owned the central electric and some 50 properties. Their administrator, Fructoso Muerza, rented the properties to peasants in the village. He had both an economic presence and a relationship with the village's Zalduendo de Caparroso family, which came to possess such goods as the poetry of the marquess. Joaquin de Marichalar was the person who, from the palace that bore his name, administered the goods of Zalduendo.

The current population of San Adrian is distributed across the plain around the new church inaugurated in 1968. The municipality is currently an industrial complex important to La Ribera of Navarre which was started at the beginning of the 20th century and consolidated starting 1920. The continuous population growth derived from this strong industry in San Adrian allowed the city to surpass the population of Lodosa in the 1960s, displacing this municipality as the most populated locality that La Ribera has ever boasted.

== Municipal Administration ==
The political administration is carried out through a city council which is democratically managed. Its members are elected every four years by universal voting and have been since the first municipal elections after the reinstatement of democracy in Spain in 1979. The electoral census is composed of residents over 18 years old who are registered as residents of the municipality or are already of Spanish or another EU member country's nationality. According to the Organic Law of General Electoral Regimes, which established the number of city councilors eligible to serve the population of the municipality, the city council is composed of 13 councilors. The headquarters of the city council of San Adrian are located at 7 Navarre Avenue.

== Civil Monuments ==
- City Council building and gardens
- Gardens of Casa Nostra
- The old bridges over the Ebro River and the Ega River
- The chimney of the Muerza Industries, located in the Plaza Fructoso Muerza
- The Monument to Auroro: located in between Princess Street, Navarre Avenue, and San Francisco Javier
- The Luis Gurpegui Muga Wineries - Wineries serving la Rioja since 1872
