= Government of Navarre =

Regional government in Spain

- Nafarroako Gobernua; Gobierno de Navarra

Overview
- Polity: Navarre
- Leader: President
- Appointed by: King of Spain
- Responsible to: Parliament of Navarre
- Headquarters: Pamplona
- Website: www.navarra.es

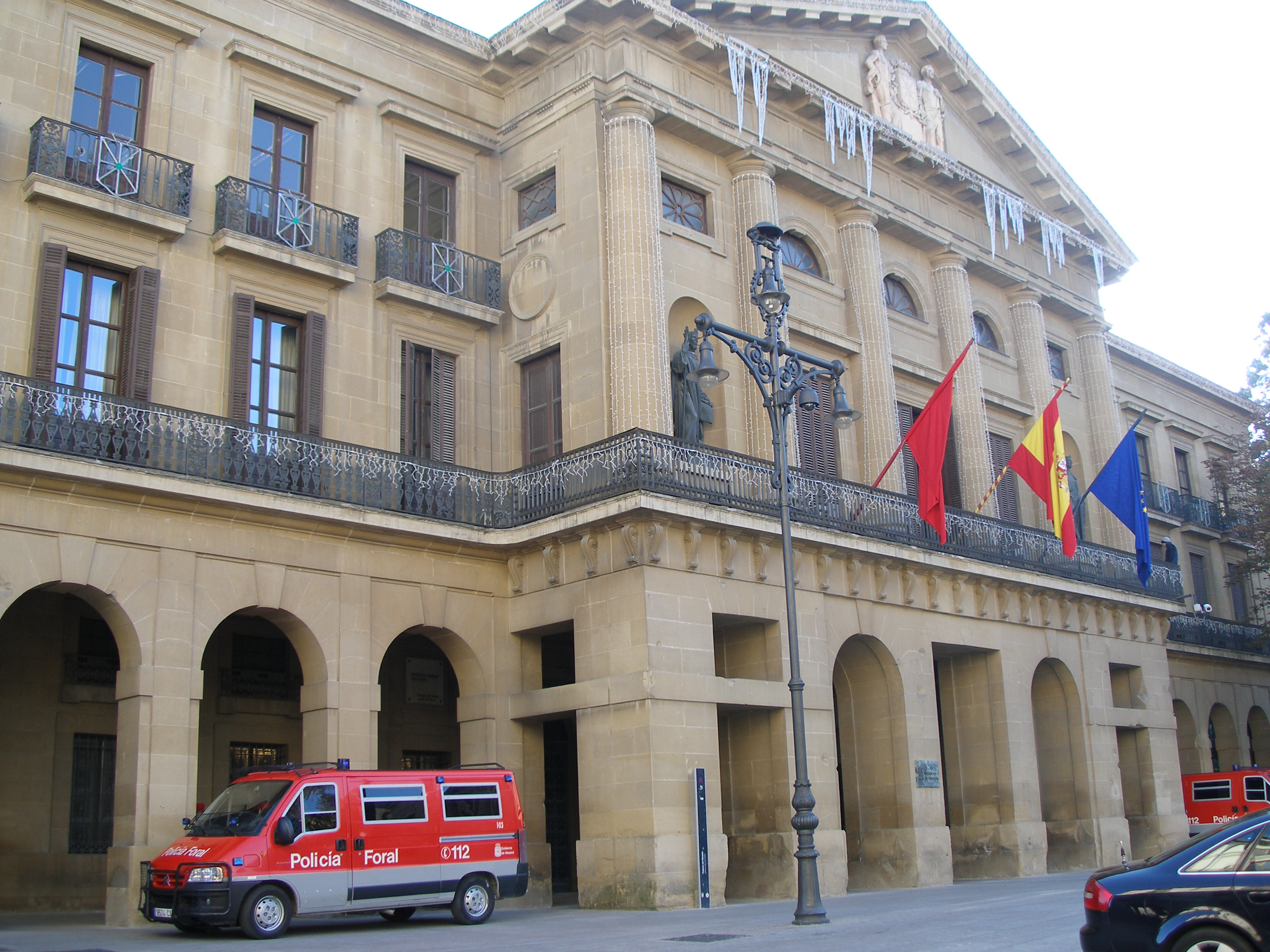
Palacio de Navarra.

The Government of Navarre (Basque: Nafarroako Gobernua; Spanish: Gobierno de Navarra) is the regional institution that exercises the executive power of the Chartered Community of Navarre (Spain). It is led by the president of the Government of Navarre, and its powers are regulated in the Regional Statute (Amejoramiento) of 1982 in Chapter III Articles 23 to 28.

== Departments of the Government of Navarre ==
These are the departments that compose the Government of Navarre as of 2025.

← Chivite II Government → (18 August 2023 – present)
Portfolio	Name	Party	Took office	Left office	Ref.
President	María Chivite	PSN–PSOE	17 August 2023	Incumbent	
First Vice President; Minister of the Presidency and Equality	Félix Taberna	PSN–PSOE	18 August 2023	Incumbent	
Second Vice President; Minister of Memory and Coexistence, Foreign Action and Basque Language	Ana Ollo	GBai (GSV)	18 August 2023	Incumbent	
Third Vice President; Minister of Housing, Youth and Migration Policies	Begoña Alfaro	Contigo (Podemos)	18 August 2023	Incumbent	
Minister of Economy and Finance	Juan Cruz Cigudosa was temporarily entrusted with the office's portfolio from 18 to 30 August 2023.				
Minister of Education	Carlos Gimeno	PSN–PSOE	18 August 2023	Incumbent	
Minister of Health	Fernando Domínguez	GBai (Ind.)	18 August 2023	Incumbent	
Minister of Territorial Cohesion	Óscar Chivite	PSN–PSOE	18 August 2023	Incumbent	
Minister of Industry and Ecological and Digital Business Transition	Mikel Irujo	GBai (PNV)	18 August 2023	Incumbent	
Minister of Social Rights, Social Economy and Employment	Mari Carmen Maeztu	PSN–PSOE	18 August 2023	Incumbent	
Minister of University, Innovation and Digital Transformation	Juan Cruz Cigudosa	PSN–PSOE	18 August 2023	5 December 2023	
Minister of Interior, Civil Service and Justice	Amparo López	PSN–PSOE	18 August 2023	3 October 2023	
Minister of Rural Development and Environment	José María Ayerdi	GBai (GSV)	18 August 2023	Incumbent	
Minister of Culture, Sports and Tourism	Rebeca Esnaola	PSN–PSOE (Ind.)	18 August 2023	Incumbent	
Spokesperson of the Government	Félix Taberna was temporarily entrusted with the office's functions from 18 August to 3 October 2023.				
=== Changes August 2023 ===
Portfolio	Name	Party	Took office	Left office	Ref.
Minister of Economy and Finance	José Luis Arasti	PSN–PSOE	30 August 2023	Incumbent	
=== Changes October 2023 ===
Portfolio	Name	Party	Took office	Left office	Ref.
Minister of Interior, Civil Service and Justice; Spokesperson of the Government	Amparo López	PSN–PSOE	3 October 2023	Incumbent	
=== Changes 6 December 2023 ===
Portfolio	Name	Party	Took office	Left office	Ref.
Minister of University, Innovation and Digital Transformation	Félix Taberna was temporarily entrusted with the office's functions from 6 to 11 December 2023.				
=== Changes 11 December 2023 ===
Portfolio	Name	Party	Took office	Left office	Ref.
Minister of University, Innovation and Digital Transformation	Patricia Fanlo	PSN–PSOE	11 December 2023	28 January 2025	
=== Changes January 2025 ===
Portfolio	Name	Party	Took office	Left office	Ref.
Minister of University, Innovation and Digital Transformation	Juan Luis García	PSN–PSOE	28 January 2025		

== See also ==
- Navarre
- Parliament of Navarre
