= Socialist Party of Navarre =

Socialist Party of Navarre Partido Socialista de Navarra
- Membership (2014): 1,634
- Ideology: Social democracy Navarrese regionalism Spanish unionism Progressivism
- Political position: Centre-left
- National affiliation: Spanish Socialist Workers' Party
- Parliament of Navarre: 11 / 50
- Congress of Deputies: 1 / 5 (Navarrese seats)
- Local seats: 208 / 1,889

Website
- www.psn-psoe.org/navarra/

The Socialist Party of Navarre (Spanish: Partido Socialista de Navarra, Basque: Nafarroako Alderdi Sozialista) is a regional branch of the mainstream Spanish Socialist Workers' Party (PSOE), the main centre-left party in Spain since the 1970s.

== History ==
The party traces its history to the founding of a socialist support group in Pamplona in August 1902. The Socialist Group of Navarre was subsumed into the PSOE's Basque branch until 1980, but then veered towards a Navarre-only stance, refusing to support a referendum on the inclusion of Navarre in a Basque community (December 1979) and aligning itself on this issue with right-wing forces (UCD, UPN).

In August 2007, Socialist chief officials in Madrid instructed the head of the party in Navarre Carlos Chivite and his PSN peers to undo the agreement reached with Nafarroa Bai to produce a progressive majority, and allow UPN to govern Navarre instead. Roberto Jiménez, who previously served as Secretary-General, won 70.5% of the vote in an election at the ninth regional congress on June 28, 2008. He took over from Carlos Chivite after the latter's death earlier that year. In the 2008 elections for the Parliament of Navarre the party received 115,837 votes, placing second behind the governing UPN. Since December 2014, Maria Chivite, niece of Carlos Chivite, has been the Secretary-General of the PSN.

In February 2014, during the latest crisis affecting the credit of UPN high-ranking officials in government, PSN refused to impeach regional president Yolanda Barcina despite the clarity of the allegations and wide consensus among Navarrese political forces on the severity of the institutional crisis. Instead, the PSN leader Roberto Jimenez focused on "thoroughly condemning" and extensively elaborating on verbal abuse hurled by a crowd of protesters voicing their anger at Y. Barcina and other UPN officials in Tafalla. In 2011 members disaffected with PSN's alliance policy contributed to the foundation of the coalition Izquierda-Ezkerra—2 MPs in the Parliament of Navarre (July 2015).

== Electoral performance ==
=== Parliament of Navarre ===
Parliament of Navarre
Election	Leading candidate	Votes	%	Seats	+/–	Government
1979	Jesús Malón	48,289	18.94 (#2)	15 / 70	—	Coalition
1983	Gabriel Urralburu	94,737	35.63 (#1)	20 / 50	5	Opposition (1983–1984)
1983	Gabriel Urralburu	94,737	35.63 (#1)	20 / 50	5	Minority (1984–1987)
1987	Gabriel Urralburu	78,453	27.68 (#1)	15 / 50	5	Minority
1991	Gabriel Urralburu	91,645	33.36 (#2)	19 / 50	4	Opposition
1995	Javier Otano	62,021	20.87 (#2)	11 / 50	8	Coalition (1995–1996)
1995	Javier Otano	62,021	20.87 (#2)	11 / 50	8	Opposition (1996–1999)
1999	Juan José Lizarbe	61,531	20.28 (#2)	11 / 50	0	Opposition
2003	Juan José Lizarbe	65,003	21.15 (#2)	11 / 50	0	Opposition
2007	Fernando Puras	74,157	22.49 (#3)	12 / 50	1	Opposition
2011	Roberto Jiménez	51,238	15.85 (#2)	9 / 50	3	Coalition (2011–2012)
2011	Roberto Jiménez	51,238	15.85 (#2)	9 / 50	3	Opposition (2012–2015)
2015	María Chivite	45,164	13.37 (#5)	7 / 50	2	Opposition
2019	María Chivite	71,838	20.63 (#2)	11 / 50	4	Coalition
2023	María Chivite	68,247	20.69 (#2)	11 / 50	0	Coalition

=== Cortes Generales ===
Cortes Generales
Election	Congress				Senate	
Election	Votes	%	Seats	+/–	Seats	+/–
1977	54,720	21.17 (#2)	2 / 5	—	0 / 4	—
1979	55,399	21.90 (#2)	1 / 5	1	1 / 4	1
1982	112,186	37.64 (#1)	3 / 5	2	3 / 4	2
1986	97,010	35.52 (#1)	2 / 5	1	3 / 4	0
1989	86,677	31.19 (#2)	2 / 5	0	1 / 4	2
1993	108,305	34.87 (#2)	2 / 5	0	1 / 4	0
1996	98,102	30.26 (#2)	2 / 5	0	1 / 4	0
2000	82,688	27.32 (#2)	2 / 5	0	1 / 4	0
2004	113,906	33.55 (#2)	2 / 5	0	1 / 4	0
2008	117,920	34.76 (#2)	2 / 5	0	1 / 4	0
2011	72,892	22.02 (#2)	1 / 5	1	1 / 4	0
2015	54,856	15.52 (#3)	1 / 5	0	0 / 4	1
2016	58,173	17.35 (#3)	1 / 5	0	0 / 4	0
Apr. 2019	94,551	25.76 (#2)	2 / 5	1	1 / 4	1
Nov. 2019	83,734	25.00 (#2)	1 / 5	1	1 / 4	0
2023	93,553	27.37 (#1)	2 / 5	1	3 / 4	2

=== European Parliament ===
European Parliament
Election	Votes	%
1987	83,111	29.49 (#1)
1989	65,540	28.60 (#1)
1994	57,102	24.80 (#2)
1999	74,004	24.78 (#2)
2004	69,833	34.94 (#2)
2009	63,848	31.48 (#2)
2014	31,629	14.48 (#3)
2019	95,164	27.96 (#1)

== Secretary-General ==
- Gabriel Urralburu (15 June 1982 – 20 June 1994)
- Javier Otano (20 June 1994 – 20 June 1996)
- Juan José Lizarbe (18 December 1997 – 18 July 2004)
- Carlos Chivite (18 July 2004 – 31 March 2008)
- Roberto Jiménez (28 June 2008 – 13 December 2014)
- María Chivite (13 December 2014 – present)
