= María Chivite =

Spanish politician (born 1978)

The Most Excellent María Chivite
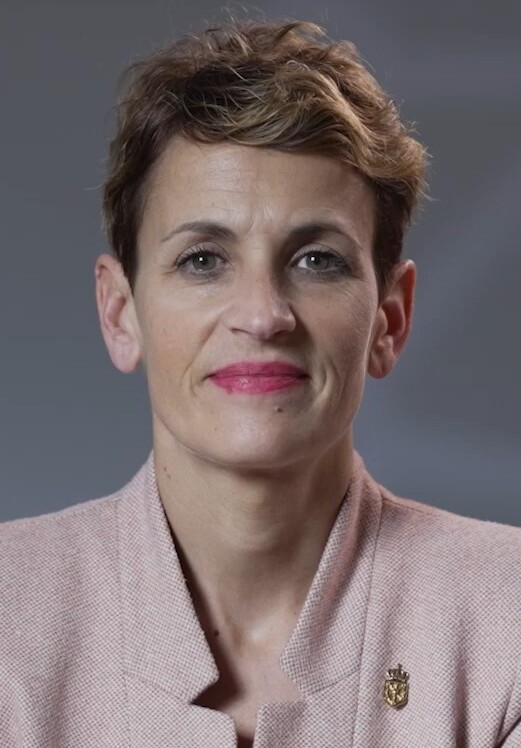

President of the Government of Navarre
- Incumbent
- Assumed office 6 August 2019
- Vice President: Javier Remírez; José María Aierdi
- Preceded by: Uxue Barkos

Secretary-General of the Socialist Party of Navarre
- Incumbent
- Assumed office 13 December 2014
- Preceded by: Roberto Jiménez

Member of the Parliament of Navarre
- Incumbent
- Assumed office 17 June 2015

Member of the Senate
- In office 13 December 2011 – 16 June 2015
- Constituency: Parliament of Navarre

Member of the Parliament of Navarre
- In office 18 June 2007 – 15 June 2011

Member of the Cintruénigo City Council
- In office 14 June 2003 – 11 June 2007

Personal details
- Born: María Victoria Chivite Navascués; 5 June 1978 (age 48) Cintruénigo, Navarre, Spain
- Party: PSOE–PSN (1998–present)
- Education: Public University of Navarre

María Victoria Chivite Navascués (born 5 June 1978) is a Spanish politician who serves as the President of the Government of Navarre. She has been the Secretary-General of the Socialist Party of Navarre (PSN–PSOE) since December 2014. A member of the 7th, 8th, and 9th terms of the Parliament of Navarre, she also served as Senator from December 2011 to June 2015. She is the longest-serving and only female president of Navarre to have been reelected.

== Early life and education ==
Chivite was born on 5 June 1978 in Cintruénigo. A member of the Socialist Youth of Spain, she graduated from the Public University of Navarre with a degree in Sociology.

== Career ==
She was municipal councillor in Cintruénigo between 2003 and 2007, and in Valle de Egüés between 2011 and 2013. She was also a member of the 7th and 8th terms of the Parliament of Navarre. Chivite, who became a member of the Senate in mid-December 2011, was appointed as Spokesperson of the Socialist Parliamentary Group in the Upper House in 2014. Proclaimed as Secretary-General of the PSN-PSOE on 13 December 2014, Chivite ran first in the PSN-PSOE list vis-à-vis the 2015 Navarrese regional election. She repeated her bid in the 2019 regional election, with the Socialist list, coming up second in seats after Navarra Suma.

Chivite was invested President of Navarre on 2 August 2019 Chivite government, commanding the yes votes of PSN-PSOE (11), Geroa Bai (9), Podemos (2), Izquierda-Ezkerra (1) groups in the regional legislature. The 20 MPs of the Navarra Suma parliamentary group voted against as well as 2 MPs of EH Bildu. The other 5 MPs of EH Bildu abstained. She assumed office on 6 August in a ceremony celebrated at the seat of the regional parliament. (Note: She used the following formula: "I promise on my conscience and honour to respect, maintain and improve the Foral Regime of Navarra, abide by the Constitution and laws and faithfully fulfill the obligations of my position as President of the Foral Community.") She was elected again in the 2023 Navarrese elections thanks to the support of Geroa Bai and Contigo/Zurekin and the abstention of EH Bildu, becoming the first female President of Navarre to be reelected.

== Notes ==
Political offices
Preceded by Uxue Barkos	President of the Government of Navarre; 2019-present	Incumbent
Party political offices
Preceded by Marcelino Iglesias	Leader of the Socialist Group in the Senate; 2014–2015	Succeeded by Óscar López Águeda
Preceded by Roberto Jiménez Alli	Secretary-General of the Socialist Party of Navarre; 2014-present	Incumbent
Preceded by Santos Cerdán	Leader of the Socialist Group in the Parliament of Navarre; 2015–2019	Succeeded by Ramón Alzórriz
