= 1983 Navarrese regional election =

Election in the Spanish region of Navarre

- 8 May 1983

All 50 seats in the Parliament of Navarre 26 seats needed for a majority
- Opinion polls
- Registered: 379,692 ▲4.0%
- Turnout: 269,042 (70.9%) ▲0.1 pp
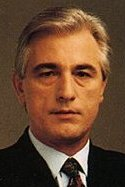

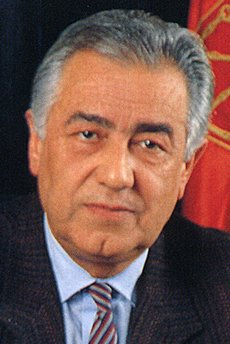

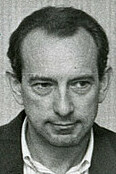

	First party	Second party	Third party
Leader	Gabriel Urralburu	Balbino Bados	José Luis Monge
Party	PSOE	UPN	AP–PDP–UL
Leader since	15 June 1982	1983	1983
Last election	15 seats, 18.9%	13 seats, 16.0%	Did not contest
Seats won	20	13	8
Seat change	▲5	0	▲8
Popular vote	94,737	62,072	37,554
Percentage	35.6%	23.3%	14.1%
Swing	▲16.7 pp	▲7.3 pp	New party
	Fourth party	Fifth party
Leader	Iñaki Aldekoa	Iñaki Cabasés
Party	HB	EAJ/PNV
Leader since	1983	1983
Last election	9 seats, 11.1%	3 seats, 5.0%
Seats won	6	3
Seat change	▼3	0
Popular vote	28,055	18,161
Percentage	10.6%	6.8%
Swing	▼0.5 pp	▲1.8 pp
President before election
Juan Manuel Arza
Independent (ex-UCD) (Note: The UCD was dissolved as a political party in February 1983, with its regional presidents and elected officials maintaining their offices either as independents or joining other parties ahead of the May 1983 regional elections.)
President after election
Gabriel Urralburu
PSOE

A regional election was held in Navarre on 8 May 1983 to elect the 1st Parliament of the chartered community. All 50 seats in the Parliament were up for election. It was held concurrently with regional elections in twelve other autonomous communities and local elections all across Spain.

The election resulted in a deadlocked situation: the Spanish Socialist Workers' Party (PSOE) became the largest political force with 20 seats but fell short of an absolute majority, whereas the conservative Navarrese People's Union (UPN) and the People's Coalition—an electoral conglomerate of the People's Alliance (AP), the People's Democratic Party (PDP) and the Liberal Union (UL)—soon announced a political agreement to join their 13 and 8 seats to form the government at the regional level and in the local city councils. The Basque Nationalist Party (PNV) was left holding the balance of power with its 3 seats, as Herri Batasuna (HB) followed a policy of abstentionism. The former ruling party of Spain, the Union of the Democratic Centre (UCD), had chosen to dissolve itself in February 1983 and did not contest the election as a result.

A constitutional conflict erupted in August 1983 as a result of the PSOE and UPN clashing over the law's interpretation as to whom should be proposed as candidate, aggravated after the Parliament's speaker attempted to propose UPN's José Ángel Zubiaur instead of PSOE candidate Gabriel Urralburu for the post. The Spanish Constitutional Court intervened to end the political deadlock ruling in PSOE's favour, and after talks for a prospective government supported by UPN, CP and PNV failed, Gabriel Urralburu was automatically elected as new Navarrese premier in April 1984 and his government sworn in on 4 May, putting an end to one of the most severe political crises in Navarre history.

== Overview ==
Under the 1982 Reintegration and Improvement of the Chartered Regime, the Parliament of Navarre was the unicameral legislature of the homonymous chartered community, having legislative power in devolved matters, as well as the ability to grant or withdraw confidence from a regional president. The electoral and procedural rules were supplemented by national law provisions (which were those used in the 1977 general election).

=== Date ===
The Foral Deputation of Navarre, in agreement with the Government of Spain, was required to call an election to the Parliament of Navarre within from 1 February to 31 May 1983.

The Parliament of Navarre could not be dissolved before the expiration date of parliament.

On 7 March 1983, it was confirmed that the Parliament election would be held on 8 May, together with regional elections for twelve other autonomous communities as well as the regularly scheduled nationwide local elections. The election to the Parliament of Navarre was officially called on 10 March 1983 with the publication of the corresponding decree in the Official Gazette of Navarre, setting election day for 8 May.

=== Electoral system ===
Voting for the Parliament was based on universal suffrage, comprising all Spanish nationals over 18 years of age, registered in Navarre and with full political rights.

The Parliament of Navarre had 50 seats in its first election. All were elected in a single multi-member constituency—corresponding to the chartered community's territory—using the D'Hondt method and closed-list proportional voting, with a three percent-threshold of valid votes (including blank ballots) regionally.

The law did not provide for by-elections to fill vacant seats; instead, any vacancies arising after the proclamation of candidates and during the legislative term were filled by the next candidates on the party lists or, when required, by designated substitutes.

== Opinion polls ==
The tables below list opinion polling results in reverse chronological order, showing the most recent first and using the dates when the survey fieldwork was done, as opposed to the date of publication. Where the fieldwork dates are unknown, the date of publication is given instead. The highest percentage figure in each polling survey is displayed with its background shaded in the leading party's colour. If a tie ensues, this is applied to the figures with the highest percentages. The "Lead" column on the right shows the percentage-point difference between the parties with the highest percentages in a poll.

=== Voting preferences ===
The table below lists raw, unweighted voting preferences.

Polling firm/Commissioner	Fieldwork date	Sample size	UCD	PSN–PSOE	UPN	HB	PNV	EE	AP–PDP–UL	Question	X mark	Lead
1983 regional election	8 May 1983	—N/a	–	25.0	16.3	9.9	4.8	1.7	7.4	—N/a	29.1	8.7
CISE–Metra Seis–ECO/CIS	5–11 Apr 1983	400	–	26.2	8.5	8.0	4.5	1.5	3.2	34.0	10.8	17.7
1982 general election	28 Oct 1982	—N/a	8.3	29.8	(Note: Within CP.)	9.2	4.4	2.2	20.3 (Note: Results for UPN–AP–PDP.)	—N/a	18.7	9.5
1979 foral election	3 Apr 1979	—N/a	18.6	13.2	11.2	7.7	–	–	–	—N/a	29.2	5.4

== Results ==
← Summary of the 8 May 1983 Parliament of Navarre election results →
Parties and alliances	Popular vote			Seats	
Parties and alliances	Votes	%	±pp	Total	+/−
Spanish Socialist Workers' Party (PSOE)	94,737	35.63	+16.69	20	+5
Navarrese People's Union (UPN)	62,072	23.34	+7.35	13	±0
People's Coalition (AP–PDP–UL)	37,554	14.12	New	8	+8
Popular Unity (HB)	28,055	10.55	−0.53	6	−3
Basque Nationalist Party (EAJ/PNV)^{1}	18,161	6.83	+1.79	3	±0
Neighbourhood Labour (Auzolan)^{2}	8,356	3.14	+0.44	0	±0
Carlist Party (PC)	6,733	2.53	−2.24	0	−1
Basque Country Left (EE)	6,292	2.37	New	0	±0
Communist Party of the Basque Country (PCE/EPK)	1,712	0.64	−1.80	0	±0
Communist League (LC)	409	0.15	New	0	±0
Union of the Democratic Centre (UCD)	n/a	n/a	−26.69	0	−20
Electoral Groups of Merindad (Amaiur)	n/a	n/a	−6.78	0	−7
Navarrese Left Union (UNAI)	n/a	n/a	−2.91	0	−1
Navarrese Foral Independents (IFN)	n/a	n/a	−1.46	0	−1
Blank ballots	1,826	0.69	+0.28		
Total	265,907			50	−20
Valid votes	265,907	98.83	+0.15		
Invalid votes	3,135	1.17	−0.15		
Votes cast / turnout	269,042	70.86	+0.10		
Abstentions	110,650	29.14	−0.10		
Registered voters	379,692				
Sources
Footnotes: ^{1} Basque Nationalist Party results are compared to Basque Nationalists totals in the 1979 election.; ^{2} Neighbourhood Labour results are compared to the combined totals of Left Navarrese Assembly and Left City Councils Navarrese Association in the 1979 election.

Popular vote
PSOE	35.63%
UPN	23.34%
AP–PDP–UL	14.12%
HB	10.55%
EAJ/PNV	6.83%
Auzolan	3.14%
PC	2.53%
EE	2.37%
Others	0.80%
Blank ballots	0.69%

Seats
PSOE	40.00%
UPN	26.00%
AP–PDP–UL	16.00%
HB	12.00%
EAJ/PNV	6.00%

== Aftermath ==
=== Government formation ===
After the regional election, UPN and the People's Coalition formed an alliance to take the post of speaker of the regional Parliament away from the PSOE, electing UPN's Balbino Bados for the post. This allowed both parties to take control of the investiture process and nominate José Ángel Zubiaur as candidate for investiture.

Investiture; Nomination of José Ángel Zubiaur (UPN)
Ballot →	21 June 1983	23 June 1983	25 June 1983	27 June 1983
Required majority →	26 out of 50	26 out of 50	Simple	Simple
Yes: • UPN (13); • AP–PDP–UL (8)	21 / 50	21 / 50	21 / 50	21 / 50
No: • PSOE (20); • PNV (3)	23 / 50	23 / 50	23 / 50	23 / 50
Abstentions	0 / 50	0 / 50	0 / 50	0 / 50
Absentees: • HB (6)	6 / 50	6 / 50	6 / 50	6 / 50

The attempts to form a Zubiaur-led right-wing government were voted down by both PSOE and PNV, which unsuccessfully held exploratory talks to test an agreement to unlock the situation. After the failure of negotiations, PSOE candidate Gabriel Urralburu had hoped to automatically become new regional president on 21 August 1983 under statutory provisions as the candidate from the party with the highest number of seats, but a clash between PSOE and UPN—whose leader Balbino Ados held the presidency of the regional parliament, the office tasked with nominating a prospective president—over the law's interpretation as to whom should be proposed as candidate resulted in a constitutional conflict. The PSOE's stance was that the legal provision from Section 29.3 of the Enhancement Law required the automatic election of the candidate from the largest party in parliament—meaning that Gabriel Urralburu was to become the new Navarrese president—whereas UPN argued that the pre-requisite condition of "candidate" was only obtained by having contested an investiture process, a criterion which up until that point only José Ángel Zubiaur had met.

On 25 August, and against the advice from the Parliament's legal services, Bados attempted to have Zubiaur nominated as new president pending the King's confirmation, a decision which was heavily criticized by all parties but UPN and AP, and which was summarily aborted by the Government of Spain and the regional PSOE bringing the issue to the Constitutional Court. This situation forced incumbent president Juan Manuel Arza to remain in the post in a caretaker capacity until the Court ruled on the issue, in a situation of political and administrative deadlock as the region relied on a prorogued 1982 budget, resigning government members could not be replaced, and legislative and cooperation projects stagnated. This was further aggravated in January 1984 after the Constitutional Court declared as null and void the dismissal in 1980 of previous president Jaime Ignacio del Burgo, reinstating him to the post until the election of the new regional premier.

In February 1984, the Constitutional Court ruled that the investiture process was to be returned to the moment after Zubiaur's fourth failed voting and that a new candidate had to be proposed for a new round of votings, with the mandate to the regional Parliament to designate "the candidate of the political party that has the largest number of seats and that had been proposed as such to the president of Parliament by that party" in the event of no successful investiture. Urralburu was proposed as new candidate for investiture as both PSOE and UPN sought to obtain PNV's support.

Investiture; Nomination of Gabriel Urralburu (PSOE)
Ballot →	2 March 1984	4 March 1984	6 March 1984	8 March 1984
Required majority →	26 out of 50	26 out of 50	Simple	Simple
Yes: • PSOE (20)	20 / 50	20 / 50	20 / 50	20 / 50
No: • UPN (13); • AP–PDP–UL (8); • PNV (3)	24 / 50	24 / 50	24 / 50	24 / 50
Abstentions	0 / 50	0 / 50	0 / 50	0 / 50
Absentees: • HB (6)	6 / 50	6 / 50	6 / 50	6 / 50

Urralburu failed in his attempts to obtain the confidence of parliament, as UPN, CP and PNV started talks to form a coalition government and avoid Urralburu's automatic election in April. On 13 March 1984, Balbino Ados proposed UPN's Juan Cruz Alli for investiture, with a parliamentary session initially scheduled for 22 March, but this attempt was averted as a result of the breakup of negotiations with the PNV, which was internally divided over the support or facilitation-through-abstention of a right-wing government in Navarre as favoured by the party's leadership but not by their local Navarrese branch. José Luis Monge was proposed by AP as a last-ditch attempt to hold an investiture session and prevent Urralburu's election.

Investiture; Nomination of José Luis Monge (AP)
Ballot →	8 April 1984	10 April 1984	12 April 1984	14 April 1984
Required majority →	26 out of 50	26 out of 50	Simple	Simple
Yes: • UPN (13); • AP–PDP–UL (8)	21 / 50	21 / 50	21 / 50	21 / 50
No: • PSOE (20) (19 until 10 Apr); • PNV (3)	22 / 50	22 / 50	23 / 50	23 / 50
Abstentions	0 / 50	0 / 50	0 / 50	0 / 50
Absentees: • HB (6); • PSOE (1) (until 10 Apr)	7 / 50	7 / 50	6 / 50	6 / 50

With Monge's defeat, Urralburu was set to be proclaimed new Navarrese president on 17 April, allowing the formation of a new government and ending the political deadlock that had resulted from the 1983 regional election.

== Bibliography ==
- Real Decreto-ley 20/1977, de 18 de marzo, sobre Normas Electorales (Royal Decree-Law 20/1977). Official State Gazette (in Spanish). 18 March 1977. BOE-A-1977-7445.
- Ley Orgánica 13/1982, de 10 de agosto, de reintegración y amejoramiento del Régimen Foral de Navarra (Organic Law 13/1982). Official State Gazette (in Spanish). 10 August 1982 [version as of 16 August 1982]. BOE-A-1982-20824.
- Decreto Foral de 9 de marzo de 1983 por el que se convocan elecciones para el Parlamento de Navarra (PDF) (Foral Decree). Official State Gazette (in Spanish). 9 March 1983. BOE-A-1983-7417.
