= 1987 Navarrese regional election =

Election in the Spanish region of Navarre

- 10 June 1987

All 50 seats in the Parliament of Navarre 26 seats needed for a majority
- Opinion polls
- Registered: 393,326 ▲3.6%
- Turnout: 286,722 (72.9%) ▲2.0 pp
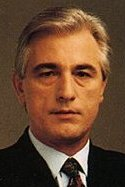

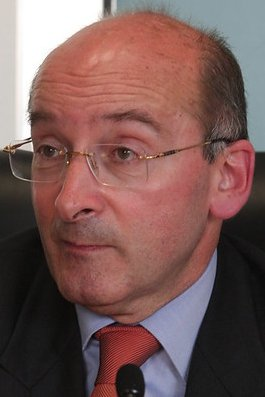

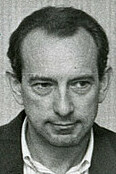

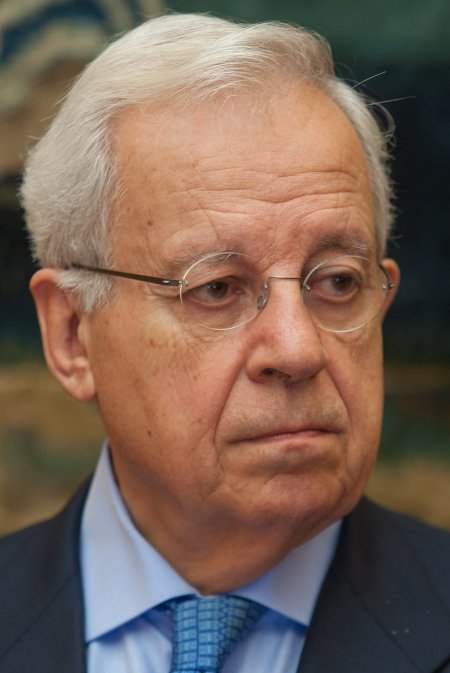
	First party	Second party	Third party
Leader	Gabriel Urralburu	Juan Cruz Alli	Iñaki Aldekoa
Party	PSN–PSOE	UPN	HB
Leader since	15 June 1982	1987	1983
Last election	20 seats, 35.6%	13 seats, 23.3%	6 seats, 10.6%
Seats won	15	14	7
Seat change	▼5	▲1	▲1
Popular vote	78,453	69,419	38,138
Percentage	27.7%	24.5%	13.5%
Swing	▼7.9 pp	▲1.2 pp	▲2.9 pp
	Fourth party	Fifth party	Sixth party
Leader	Pablo García Tellechea	Iñaki Cabasés	Jaime Ignacio del Burgo
Party	CDS	EA	UDF
Leader since	1987	1986	1986
Last election	Did not contest	Did not contest	Did not contest
Seats won	4	4	3
Seat change	▲4	▲4	▲3
Popular vote	21,022	19,840	17,663
Percentage	7.4%	7.0%	6.2%
Swing	New party	New party	New party
President before election
Gabriel Urralburu
PSOE
President after election
Gabriel Urralburu
PSOE

A regional election was held in Navarre on 10 June 1987 to elect the 2nd Parliament of the chartered community. All 50 seats in the Parliament were up for election. It was held concurrently with regional elections in twelve other autonomous communities and local elections all across Spain, as well as the 1987 European Parliament election.

The Spanish Socialist Workers' Party (PSOE), under then-incumbent President Gabriel Urralburu, won the election for a second consecutive term, albeit with a diminished share of the vote (27.7%, losing nearly 8 percentage points from 1983) and losing 5 seats. The centre-right spectrum stood divided to the election: the Navarrese People's Union (UPN) maintained its second place with 24.5% and 14 seats (gaining one); the Foral Democrat Union (UDF), an alliance between the People's Democratic Party (PDP) and the Liberal Party (PL), formed after the breakup of the People's Coalition, obtained 6.2% and 3 seats. The People's Alliance (AP) suffered from this division and fell to 7th place (4.2% and 2 seats).

The Democratic and Social Centre (CDS), the party of former Spanish Prime Minister Adolfo Suárez, benefitted from this division and finished fourth, gaining 4 seats. Meanwhile, the left-wing Herri Batasuna (HB) also improved its position from 1983 and scored one of the best results for the abertzale left in Navarre. Eusko Alkartasuna (EA), a split from the Basque Nationalist Party (PNV) formed in 1986 from PNV dissidents, entered the Parliament with 4 seats, while the small Euskadiko Ezkerra also entered for the first time.

== Overview ==
Under the 1982 Reintegration and Improvement of the Chartered Regime, the Parliament of Navarre was the unicameral legislature of the homonymous chartered community, having legislative power in devolved matters, as well as the ability to grant or withdraw confidence from a regional president. The electoral and procedural rules were supplemented by national law provisions.

=== Date ===
The term of the Parliament of Navarre expired four years after the date of its previous ordinary election. The election decree was required to be issued no later than 25 days before the scheduled expiration date of parliament and published on the following day in the Official Gazette of Navarre (BON), with election day taking place between 54 and 60 days after the decree's publication. The previous election was held on 8 May 1983, which meant that the chamber's term would have expired on 8 May 1987. The election decree was required to be published in the BON no later than 14 April 1987, setting the latest possible date for election day on 13 June 1987.

The Parliament of Navarre could not be dissolved before the expiration date of parliament.

The election to the Parliament of Navarre was officially called on 14 April 1987 with the publication of the corresponding decree in the BON, setting election day for 10 June and scheduling for the chamber to reconvene on 4 July.

=== Electoral system ===
Voting for the Parliament was based on universal suffrage, comprising all Spanish nationals over 18 years of age, registered in Navarre and with full political rights, provided that they had not been deprived of the right to vote by a final sentence, nor were legally incapacitated.

The Parliament of Navarre had a minimum of 40 and a maximum of 60 seats, with electoral provisions fixing its size at 50. All were elected in a single multi-member constituency—corresponding to the chartered community's territory—using the D'Hondt method and closed-list proportional voting, with a three percent-threshold of valid votes (including blank ballots) regionally.

The law did not provide for by-elections to fill vacant seats; instead, any vacancies arising after the proclamation of candidates and during the legislative term were filled by the next candidates on the party lists or, when required, by designated substitutes.

== Opinion polls ==
The tables below list opinion polling results in reverse chronological order, showing the most recent first and using the dates when the survey fieldwork was done, as opposed to the date of publication. Where the fieldwork dates are unknown, the date of publication is given instead. The highest percentage figure in each polling survey is displayed with its background shaded in the leading party's colour. If a tie ensues, this is applied to the figures with the highest percentages. The "Lead" column on the right shows the percentage-point difference between the parties with the highest percentages in a poll.

=== Voting intention estimates ===
The table below lists weighted voting intention estimates. Refusals are generally excluded from the party vote percentages, while question wording and the treatment of "don't know" responses and those not intending to vote may vary between polling organisations. When available, seat projections determined by the polling organisations are displayed below (or in place of) the percentages in a smaller font; 26 seats were required for an absolute majority in the Parliament of Navarre.

Polling firm/Commissioner	Fieldwork date	Sample size	Turnout	PSN–PSOE	UPN	AP–PDP–PL	HB	PNV	EE	UDF	AP	CDS	EA	Lead
1987 regional election	10 Jun 1987	—N/a	72.9	27.7; 15	24.5; 14	–	13.5; 7	0.9; 0	3.4; 1	6.2; 3	4.2; 2	7.4; 4	7.0; 4	3.2
CIES/Diario de Navarra	27–30 May 1987	1,195	71–74	29.0– 31.0; 16/18	19.0– 21.0; 10/12	–	14.0– 16.0; 7/9	2.0; 0	3.0– 4.0; 0/2	7.0– 8.0; 3/5	4.0– 6.0; 2/4	7.0– 9.0; 4/6	5.0– 7.0; 3/4	10.0
Demoscopia/El País	22–26 May 1987	?	70	30.4; 17/18	32.3; 18/19	–	12.9; 6/7	–	3.7; 0/2	–	5.0; 2	8.4; 4/5	2.9; 0/2	1.9
Sofemasa/AP	16 Apr 1987	?	?	29.6	5.5	–	16.6	–	–	–	20.3	14.8	–	9.3
1986 general election	22 Jun 1986	—N/a	69.8	35.5 (20)	(Note: Within CP.)	29.6 (17)	13.9 (8)	1.8 (0)	2.8 (0)			9.6 (5)	–	5.9
1983 regional election	8 May 1983	—N/a	70.9	35.6; 20	23.3; 13	14.1; 8	10.6; 6	6.8; 3	2.4; 0			–	–	12.3

=== Voting preferences ===
The table below lists raw, unweighted voting preferences.

Color key:

Poll conducted after legal ban on opinion polls

Polling firm/Commissioner	Fieldwork date	Sample size	PSN–PSOE	UPN	AP–PDP–PL	HB	PNV	EE	UDF	AP	CDS	EA	Question	X mark	Lead
1987 regional election (Note: Does not include non-resident citizens.)	10 Jun 1987	—N/a	20.0	17.6	–	9.7	0.7	2.4	4.5	3.1	5.3	5.1	—N/a	27.0	2.4
CIS	2–5 Jun 1987	487	21.8	10.5	–	6.8	1.2	2.9	3.3	1.4	4.5	4.1	33.3	7.8	11.3
CIS	8–16 May 1987	1,182	23.8	9.9	–	6.1	1.2	2.3	1.7	2.6	2.8	3.6	37.6	6.8	13.9
CIS	19–28 Apr 1987	1,192	22.0	9.0	–	6.0	1.0	3.0	1.0	3.0	3.0	4.0	40.0	7.0	13.0
CIS	25 Mar–5 Apr 1987	1,192	21.0	7.0	–	6.0	2.0	2.0	1.0	6.0	4.0	4.0	40.0	5.0	14.0
CIS	21–31 Jan 1987	1,153	26.0	11.0	–	8.0	2.0	4.0	1.0	3.0	4.0	4.0	26.0	11.0	15.0
1986 general election	22 Jun 1986	—N/a	24.5		20.4	9.6	1.2	1.9			6.6	–	—N/a	29.7	4.1
1983 regional election	8 May 1983	—N/a	25.0	16.3	9.9	7.4	4.8	1.7			–	–	—N/a	29.1	8.7

=== Victory preferences ===
The table below lists opinion polling on the victory preferences for each party in the event of a regional election taking place.

Color key:

Poll conducted after legal ban on opinion polls

Polling firm/Commissioner	Fieldwork date	Sample size	PSN–PSOE	UPN	HB	PNV	EE	UDF	AP	CDS	EA	Other/ None	Question	Lead
CIS	2–5 Jun 1987	487	24.0	12.3	7.8	2.1	2.7	3.7	2.1	6.0	4.5	5.6	29.3	11.7
CIS	8–16 May 1987	1,182	27.2	11.4	6.1	1.3	2.8	1.7	2.9	3.5	4.4	2.0	36.9	15.8
CIS	19–28 Apr 1987	1,192	24.0	9.0	6.0	1.0	3.0	1.0	3.0	4.0	5.0	3.0	40.0	15.0
CIS	25 Mar–5 Apr 1987	1,192	24.0	7.0	8.0	2.0	2.0	1.0	6.0	5.0	3.0	2.0	40.0	16.0
CIS	21–31 Jan 1987	1,153	28.0	11.0	9.0	2.0	4.0	1.0	3.0	4.0	5.0	1.0	32.0	17.0

=== Victory likelihood ===
The table below lists opinion polling on the perceived likelihood of victory for each party in the event of a regional election taking place.

Color key:

Poll conducted after legal ban on opinion polls

Polling firm/Commissioner	Fieldwork date	Sample size	PSN–PSOE	UPN	HB	PNV	AP	CDS	Other/ None	Question	Lead
CIS	2–5 Jun 1987	487	53.2	3.5	1.2	0.4	0.6	1.4	1.4	38.2	49.7
CIS	8–16 May 1987	1,182	55.9	2.0	0.4	0.1	0.3	0.4	0.7	40.1	53.9
CIS	19–28 Apr 1987	1,192	52.0	3.0	0.0	–	0.0	1.0	0.0	43.0	49.0
CIS	25 Mar–5 Apr 1987	1,192	51.0	1.0	1.0	1.0	1.0	1.0	0.0	44.0	50.0
CIS	21–31 Jan 1987	1,153	57.0	3.0	1.0	1.0	1.0	1.0	1.0	35.0	54.0

=== Preferred President ===
The table below lists opinion polling on leader preferences to become president of the Foral Deputation of Navarre.

Color key:

Poll conducted after legal ban on opinion polls

Polling firm/Commissioner	Fieldwork date	Sample size									Other/ None/ Not care	Question	Lead
Polling firm/Commissioner	Fieldwork date	Sample size	Urralburu PSN	Viñes UPN	Alli UPN	Aldekoa HB	Arozarena EE	Del Burgo UDF	Tellechea CDS	Cabasés EA	Other/ None/ Not care	Question	Lead
CIS	2–5 Jun 1987	487	26.7	–	8.4	6.8	1.4	6.6	0.8	3.7	19.5	26.1	18.3
CIS	8–16 May 1987	1,182	22.2	–	3.2	4.8	0.5	5.5	0.6	4.1	16.9	42.3	16.7
CIS	19–28 Apr 1987	1,192	20.0	1.0	5.0	–	1.0	6.0	1.0	6.0	25.0	35.0	14.0
CIS	25 Mar–5 Apr 1987	1,192	22.0	1.0	–	5.0	1.0	6.0	0.0	4.0	21.0	40.0	16.0

== Results ==
← Summary of the 10 June 1987 Parliament of Navarre election results →
Parties and alliances	Popular vote			Seats	
Parties and alliances	Votes	%	±pp	Total	+/−
Socialist Party of Navarre (PSN–PSOE)	78,453	27.68	−7.95	15	−5
Navarrese People's Union (UPN)	69,419	24.50	+1.16	14	+1
Popular Unity (HB)	38,138	13.46	+2.91	7	+1
Democratic and Social Centre (CDS)	21,022	7.42	New	4	+4
Basque Solidarity (EA)	19,840	7.00	New	4	+4
Foral Democratic Union (PDF–PDP, PL) (UDF)	17,663	6.23	New	3	+3
People's Alliance (AP)^{1}	11,985	4.23	−9.89	2	−6
Basque Country Left (EE)	9,618	3.39	+1.02	1	+1
Left Assembly of Navarre (B)^{2}	5,880	2.07	−1.07	0	±0
United Left (IU)^{3}	3,802	1.34	+0.70	0	±0
Basque Nationalist Party (EAJ/PNV)	2,661	0.94	−5.89	0	−3
Workers' Party of Spain–Communist Unity (PTE–UC)	964	0.34	New	0	±0
Blank ballots	3,950	1.39	+0.70		
Total	283,395			50	±0
Valid votes	283,395	98.84	+0.01		
Invalid votes	3,327	1.16	−0.01		
Votes cast / turnout	286,722	72.90	+2.04		
Abstentions	106,604	27.10	−2.04		
Registered voters	393,326				
Sources
Footnotes: ^{1} People's Alliance results are compared to People's Coalition totals in the 1983 election.; ^{2} Left Assembly of Navarre results are compared to Neighbourhood Labor totals in the 1983 election.; ^{3} United Left results are compared to Communist Party of the Basque Country totals in the 1983 election.

Popular vote
PSN–PSOE	27.68%
UPN	24.50%
HB	13.46%
CDS	7.42%
EA	7.00%
UDF	6.23%
AP	4.23%
EE	3.39%
B	2.07%
IU	1.34%
Others	1.28%
Blank ballots	1.39%

Seats
PSN–PSOE	30.00%
UPN	28.00%
HB	14.00%
CDS	8.00%
EA	8.00%
UDF	6.00%
AP	4.00%
EE	2.00%

== Aftermath ==
=== Government formation ===
As a result of the investiture process failing to provide a regional President within two months from the first ballot, Gabriel Urralburu was automatically elected on 30 September 1987 and officially sworn into office on 8 October.

Investiture; Nomination of Gabriel Urralburu (PSN)
Ballot →	30 July 1987	1 August 1987	3 August 1987	5 August 1987
Required majority →	26 out of 50	26 out of 50	Simple	Simple
Yes: • PSN (15)	15 / 50	15 / 50	15 / 50	15 / 50
No: • UPN (14); • HB (6) (from 5 Aug); • CDS (4); • EA (4); • UDF (3); • AP (2); • EE (1)	28 / 50	28 / 50	34 / 50	34 / 50
Abstentions: • HB (7) (until 3 Aug)	7 / 50	7 / 50	0 / 50	0 / 50
Absentees	0 / 50	0 / 50	0 / 50	0 / 50

Investiture; Nomination of Juan Cruz Alli (UPN)
Ballot →	20 August 1987	22 August 1987	24 August 1987	26 August 1987
Required majority →	26 out of 50	26 out of 50	Simple	Simple
Yes: • UPN (14); • UDF (3); • AP (2)	19 / 50	19 / 50	19 / 50	19 / 50
No: • PSN (15); • HB (6) (5 on 22 Aug); • EA (4); • EE (1)	26 / 50	25 / 50	26 / 50	26 / 50
Abstentions: • CDS (4)	4 / 50	4 / 50	4 / 50	4 / 50
Absentees: • HB (1) (2 on 22 Aug)	1 / 50	2 / 50	1 / 50	1 / 50

== Bibliography ==
- Ley Orgánica 13/1982, de 10 de agosto, de reintegración y amejoramiento del Régimen Foral de Navarra (Organic Law 13/1982). Official State Gazette (in Spanish). 10 August 1982 [version as of 16 August 1982]. BOE-A-1982-20824.
- Ley Orgánica 5/1985, de 19 de junio, del Régimen Electoral General (Organic Law 5/1985). Official State Gazette (in Spanish). 19 June 1985 [version as of 3 April 1987]. BOE-A-1985-11672.
- Ley Foral 16/1986, de 17 de noviembre, reguladora de las elecciones al Parlamento de Navarra (Foral Law 16/1986). Official State Gazette (in Spanish). 17 November 1986 [version as of 21 November 1986]. BOE-A-1987-1255.
- Decreto Foral 1/1987, de 13 de abril, del Presidente del Gobierno, por el que se convocan elecciones al Parlamento de Navarra (Foral Decree 1/1987). Official State Gazette (in Spanish). 13 April 1987. BOE-A-1987-9233.
