= 1991 Navarrese regional election =

Election in the Spanish region of Navarre

- 26 May 1991

All 50 seats in the Parliament of Navarre 26 seats needed for a majority
- Opinion polls
- Registered: 414,913 ▲5.5%
- Turnout: 276,773 (66.7%) ▼6.2 pp
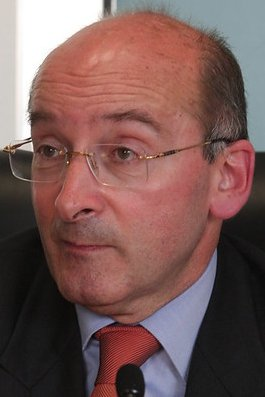

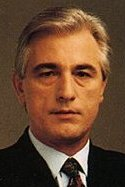

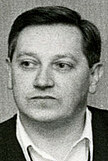

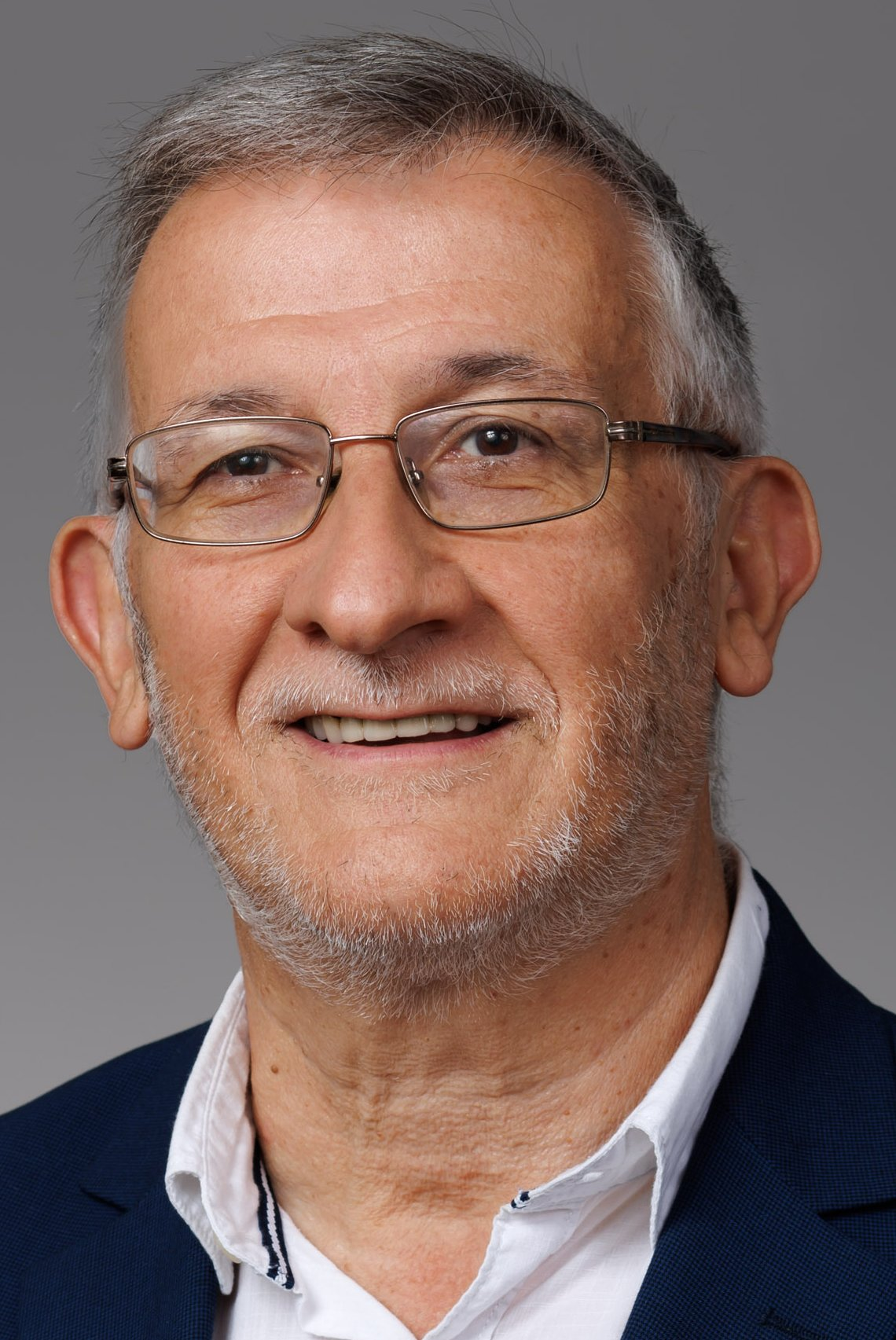
	First party	Second party	Third party
Leader	Juan Cruz Alli	Gabriel Urralburu	Patxi Zabaleta
Party	UPN	PSN–PSOE	HB
Leader since	1987	15 June 1982	1991
Last election	19 seats, 35.0% (Note: Results for UPN (24.50%, 14 seats), UDF (6.23%, 3 seats) and AP (4.23%, 2 seats) in the 1987 election.)	15 seats, 27.7%	7 seats, 13.5%
Seats won	20	19	6
Seat change	▲1	▲4	▼1
Popular vote	96,005	91,645	30,762
Percentage	35.0%	33.4%	11.2%
Swing	0.0 pp	▲5.7 pp	▼2.3 pp
	Fourth party	Fifth party
Leader	Fermín Ciaurriz	Félix Taberna
Party	EA	IU
Leader since	1991	1991
Last election	4 seats, 7.0%	0 seats, 1.3%
Seats won	3	2
Seat change	▼1	▲2
Popular vote	15,170	11,167
Percentage	5.5%	4.1%
Swing	▼1.5 pp	▲2.8 pp
President before election
Gabriel Urralburu
PSOE
President after election
Juan Cruz Alli
UPN

A regional election was held in Navarre on 26 May 1991 to elect the 3rd Parliament of the chartered community. All 50 seats in the Parliament were up for election. It was held concurrently with regional elections in twelve other autonomous communities and local elections all across Spain.

== Overview ==
Under the 1982 Reintegration and Improvement of the Chartered Regime, the Parliament of Navarre was the unicameral legislature of the homonymous chartered community, having legislative power in devolved matters, as well as the ability to grant or withdraw confidence from a regional president. The electoral and procedural rules were supplemented by national law provisions.

=== Date ===
The term of the Parliament of Navarre expired four years after the date of its previous ordinary election, with amendments earlier in 1991 fixing election day for the fourth Sunday of May every four years. The election decree was required to be issued between 54 and 60 days before the scheduled election date and published on the following day in the Official Gazette of Navarre (BON). The previous election was held on 10 June 1987, setting the date for election day on the fourth Sunday of May four years later, which was 26 May 1991.

The Parliament of Navarre could not be dissolved before the expiration date of parliament.

The election to the Parliament of Navarre was officially called on 2 April 1991 with the publication of the corresponding decree in the BON, setting election day for 26 May and scheduling for the chamber to reconvene on 24 June.

=== Electoral system ===
Voting for the Parliament was based on universal suffrage, comprising all Spanish nationals over 18 years of age, registered in Navarre and with full political rights, provided that they had not been deprived of the right to vote by a final sentence, nor were legally incapacitated.

The Parliament of Navarre had a minimum of 40 and a maximum of 60 seats, with electoral provisions fixing its size at 50. All were elected in a single multi-member constituency—corresponding to the chartered community's territory—using the D'Hondt method and closed-list proportional voting, with a three percent-threshold of valid votes (including blank ballots) regionally.

The law did not provide for by-elections to fill vacant seats; instead, any vacancies arising after the proclamation of candidates and during the legislative term were filled by the next candidates on the party lists or, when required, by designated substitutes.

== Opinion polls ==
The tables below list opinion polling results in reverse chronological order, showing the most recent first and using the dates when the survey fieldwork was done, as opposed to the date of publication. Where the fieldwork dates are unknown, the date of publication is given instead. The highest percentage figure in each polling survey is displayed with its background shaded in the leading party's colour. If a tie ensues, this is applied to the figures with the highest percentages. The "Lead" column on the right shows the percentage-point difference between the parties with the highest percentages in a poll.

=== Voting intention estimates ===
The table below lists weighted voting intention estimates. Refusals are generally excluded from the party vote percentages, while question wording and the treatment of "don't know" responses and those not intending to vote may vary between polling organisations. When available, seat projections determined by the polling organisations are displayed below (or in place of) the percentages in a smaller font; 26 seats were required for an absolute majority in the Parliament of Navarre.

Polling firm/Commissioner	Fieldwork date	Sample size	Turnout	PSN–PSOE	UPN	HB	CDS	EA	UDF	AP	EE	IU	PNV	Lead
1991 regional election	26 May 1991	—N/a	66.7	33.4; 19	35.0; 20	11.2; 6	2.1; 0	5.5; 3	(Note: Within UPN.)		2.1; 0	4.1; 2	1.1; 0	1.6
Sigma Dos/El Mundo	18 May 1991	?	?	29.9; 17	32.3; 17/18	12.0; 7/8	–	6.0; 3			3.9; 1	5.3; 2/3	–	2.4
CIES/Diario de Navarra	9–16 May 1991	1,447	68–70	30.0– 32.0; 17/18	33.0– 35.0; 19/21	11.0– 12.0; 6/7	2.5– 3.5; 0/1	5.5– 6.5; 3/4			2.5– 3.5; 0/1	5.0– 6.0; 2/3	2.0– 3.0; 0/1	3.0
Metra Seis/El Independiente	12 May 1991	?	?	26.8; 15	33.5; 19	12.4; 7	4.2; 2	6.4; 3			3.2; 1	4.7; 2	3.3; 1	6.7
Demoscopia/El País	4–7 May 1991	500	?	27.5; 15	40.4; 22	11.7; 6	4.6; 2	4.4; 2			1.9; 0	6.0; 3	1.8; 0	12.9
CIES/Diario de Navarra	22–29 Apr 1991	1,005	68	32.0; 18	34.2; 19/20	11.0; 6	4.0; 1/2	5.0; 3			3.5; 0/1	4.8; 2/3	–	2.2
1989 general election	29 Oct 1989	—N/a	68.5	31.2 (17)	33.2 (18)	11.0 (6)	7.0 (4)	4.8 (2)			2.9 (0)	5.7 (3)	0.9 (0)	2.0
1989 EP election	15 Jun 1989	—N/a	57.3	28.6 (17)	27.1 (16)	13.8 (8)	5.4 (3)	6.2 (3)			3.7 (2)	3.1 (1)	1.1 (0)	1.5
1987 regional election	10 Jun 1987	—N/a	72.9	27.7; 15	24.5; 14	13.5; 7	7.4; 4	7.0; 4	6.2; 3	4.2; 2	3.4; 1	1.3; 0	0.9; 0	3.2

=== Voting preferences ===
The table below lists raw, unweighted voting preferences.

Polling firm/Commissioner	Fieldwork date	Sample size	PSN–PSOE	UPN	HB	CDS	EA	UDF	AP	EE	IU	PNV	Question	X mark	Lead
1991 regional election (Note: Does not include non-resident citizens.)	26 May 1991	—N/a	22.2	23.2	7.5	1.4	3.7			1.4	2.7	0.7	—N/a	31.8	1.0
CIES/Diario de Navarra	9–16 May 1991	1,447	26.8	16.7	9.8	1.2	5.5			2.2	3.8	2.2	17.0	12.2	10.1
CIES/Diario de Navarra	22–29 Apr 1991	1,005	25.5	14.4	7.8	1.4	3.5			3.2	3.5	2.2	26.3	9.9	11.1
CIS	13–25 Mar 1991	522	22.0	11.0	7.0	1.0	3.0			5.0	3.0	1.0	36.0	9.0	11.0
CIS	6–17 Feb 1991	789	23.0	12.0	6.0	1.0	2.0	0.0	4.0	2.0	3.0	1.0	33.0	12.0	11.0
1989 general election	29 Oct 1989	—N/a	21.3	22.6	7.5	4.8	3.3			2.0	3.9	0.6	—N/a	31.3	1.3
1989 EP election	15 Jun 1989	—N/a	16.2	15.4	7.8	3.1	3.5			2.1	1.8	0.6	—N/a	42.5	0.8
1987 regional election	10 Jun 1987	—N/a	20.0	17.6	9.7	5.3	5.1	4.5	3.1	2.4	1.0	0.7	—N/a	27.0	2.4

=== Victory preferences ===
The table below lists opinion polling on the victory preferences for each party in the event of a regional election taking place.

Polling firm/Commissioner	Fieldwork date	Sample size	PSN–PSOE	UPN	HB	CDS	EA	UDF	AP	EE	IU	PNV	Other/ None	Question	Lead
CIS	13–25 Mar 1991	522	24.0	13.0	8.0	1.0	2.0			5.0	4.0	1.0	9.0	33.0	11.0
CIS	6–17 Feb 1991	789	23.0	12.0	6.0	1.0	2.0	1.0	5.0	3.0	4.0	1.0	10.0	32.0	11.0

== Results ==
← Summary of the 26 May 1991 Parliament of Navarre election results →
Parties and alliances	Popular vote			Seats	
Parties and alliances	Votes	%	±pp	Total	+/−
Navarrese People's Union (UPN)^{1}	96,005	34.95	−0.01	20	+1
Socialist Party of Navarre (PSN–PSOE)	91,645	33.36	+5.68	19	+4
Popular Unity (HB)	30,762	11.20	−2.26	6	−1
Basque Solidarity (EA)	15,170	5.52	−1.48	3	−1
United Left (IU)	11,167	4.07	+2.73	2	+2
Assembly (B)	6,543	2.38	+0.31	0	±0
Basque Country Left (EE)	5,824	2.12	−1.27	0	−1
Democratic and Social Centre (CDS)	5,650	2.06	−5.36	0	−4
Livestock Agricultural Party (PAG)	3,855	1.40	New	0	±0
Basque Nationalist Party (EAJ/PNV)	3,071	1.12	+0.18	0	±0
Carlist Party (PC)	1,353	0.49	New	0	±0
Blank ballots	3,637	1.32	−0.07		
Total	274,682			50	±0
Valid votes	274,682	99.24	+0.40		
Invalid votes	2,091	0.76	−0.40		
Votes cast / turnout	276,773	66.71	−6.19		
Abstentions	138,140	33.29	+6.19		
Registered voters	414,913				
Sources
Footnotes: ^{1} Navarrese People's Union results are compared to the combined totals of Navarrese People's Union, Foral Democratic Union and People's Alliance in the 1987 election.

Popular vote
UPN	34.95%
PSN–PSOE	33.36%
HB	11.20%
EA	5.52%
IU	4.07%
B	2.38%
EE	2.12%
CDS	2.06%
PAG	1.40%
EAJ/PNV	1.12%
PC	0.49%
Blank ballots	1.32%

Seats
UPN	40.00%
PSN–PSOE	38.00%
HB	12.00%
EA	6.00%
IU	4.00%

== Aftermath ==
=== Government formation ===
As a result of the investiture process failing to provide a regional president within two months from the first ballot, Juan Cruz Alli was automatically elected on 18 September 1991 and officially sworn into office on 23 September.

Investiture; Nomination of Juan Cruz Alli (UPN)
Ballot →	18 July 1991 (Note: The 6 HB MPs did not cast a vote in the 18 and 20 July ballots.)	20 July 1991	22 July 1991	24 July 1991
Required majority →	26 out of 50	26 out of 50	Simple	Simple
Yes: • UPN (20)	20 / 50	20 / 50	20 / 50	20 / 50
No: • PSN (19); • HB (6) (from 22 Jul); • EA (3); • IU (2)	24 / 50	24 / 50	30 / 50	30 / 50
Abstentions	0 / 50	0 / 50	0 / 50	0 / 50
Absentees	0 / 50	0 / 50	0 / 50	0 / 50

Investiture; Nomination of Gabriel Urralburu (PSN)
Ballot →	8 August 1991	10 August 1991	12 August 1991	14 August 1991
Required majority →	26 out of 50	26 out of 50	Simple	Simple
Yes: • PSN (19) (18 on 14 Aug); • EA (3); • IU (1) (on 14 Aug)	22 / 50	22 / 50	22 / 50	22 / 50
No: • UPN (20); • HB (6)	26 / 50	26 / 50	26 / 50	26 / 50
Abstentions: • IU (2) (1 on 14 Aug)	2 / 50	2 / 50	2 / 50	1 / 50
Absentees: • PSN (1) (on 14 Aug)	0 / 50	0 / 50	0 / 50	1 / 50

== Bibliography ==
- Ley Orgánica 13/1982, de 10 de agosto, de reintegración y amejoramiento del Régimen Foral de Navarra (Organic Law 13/1982). Official State Gazette (in Spanish). 10 August 1982 [version as of 16 August 1982]. BOE-A-1982-20824.
- Ley Orgánica 5/1985, de 19 de junio, del Régimen Electoral General (Organic Law 5/1985). Official State Gazette (in Spanish). 19 June 1985 [version as of 14 March 1991]. BOE-A-1985-11672.
- Ley Foral 16/1986, de 17 de noviembre, reguladora de las elecciones al Parlamento de Navarra (Foral Law 16/1986). Official State Gazette (in Spanish). 17 November 1986 [version as of 25 March 1991]. BOE-A-1987-1255.
- Decreto Foral 2/1991, de 1 de abril, del Presidente del Gobierno de Navarra, por el que se convocan elecciones al Parlamento de Navarra (Foral Decree 2/1991). Official State Gazette (in Spanish). 1 April 1991. BOE-A-1991-7969.
