= President of the Government of Navarre =

The president of the Government of Navarre (Spanish: Presidente del Gobierno de Navarra), is the head of government of the devolved government of the Chartered Community of Navarre.

== Election ==
Investiture processes to elect the regional president require for an absolute majority—more than half the votes cast—to be obtained in the first ballot. If unsuccessful, a new ballot will be held 24 hours later requiring only of a simple majority—more affirmative than negative votes—to succeed. If such majorities are not achieved, successive candidate proposals would be processed under the same procedure. In the event of the investiture process failing to elect a regional president within a three-month period from the election date, the Parliament will be automatically dissolved and a snap election called.

Upon their election, regional presidents are appointed by Royal Decree of the Monarch, countersigned by the Prime Minister.

== List of officeholders ==
Since the first democratic elections of 1979 there have been two presidents of UCD in the Deputation of Navarre. Subsequently, the Government of Navarre has had two presidents of PSN, three of UPN and one of Geroa Bai. Presently Maria Chivite is President of Navarre. She was appointed to this post in August 2019.

Governments:

- PSOE
- UPN
- Mixed coalition

| Portrait | Name (Birth–Death) | Term of office | | | Party | Government Composition | Election | Monarch (Reign) | Ref. |
| Portrait | Name (Birth–Death) | Took office | Left office | Duration | Party | Government Composition | Election | Monarch (Reign) | Ref. |
|---|---|---|---|---|---|---|---|---|---|
| | Jaime Ignacio del Burgo (born 1942) | 19 April 1979 | 28 April 1980 | 1 year and 9 days | UCD | Foral Deputation; UCD–PSOE–HB–OM | 1979 | King; Juan Carlos I (1975–2014) | |
| During this interval, Vice President Juan Manuel Arza served as acting officeholder. | | | | | | Foral Deputation; UCD–PSOE–HB–OM | 1979 | King; Juan Carlos I (1975–2014) | |
| | Juan Manuel Arza (1932–2019) | 29 September 1980 | 14 January 1984 (removed) | 3 years and 107 days | UCD | Foral Deputation; UCD–PSOE–HB–OM | 1979 | King; Juan Carlos I (1975–2014) | |
| | Juan Manuel Arza (1932–2019) | 29 September 1980 | 14 January 1984 (removed) | 3 years and 107 days | Independent | Foral Deputation; UCD–PSOE–HB–OM | 1979 | King; Juan Carlos I (1975–2014) | |
| | Jaime Ignacio del Burgo (born 1942) | 14 January 1984 (reinstated) | 27 April 1984 | 104 days | PDP | Foral Deputation; UCD–PSOE–HB–OM | 1979 | King; Juan Carlos I (1975–2014) | |
| | Gabriel Urralburu (born 1950) | 27 April 1984 | 6 October 1987 | 7 years and 149 days | PSN–PSOE | Urralburu I PSOE | 1983 | King; Juan Carlos I (1975–2014) | |
| | Gabriel Urralburu (born 1950) | 6 October 1987 | 23 September 1991 | 7 years and 149 days | PSN–PSOE | Urralburu II; PSOE | 1987 | King; Juan Carlos I (1975–2014) | |
| | Juan Cruz Alli (born 1942) | 23 September 1991 | 26 July 1995 | 3 years and 306 days | UPN | Alli; UPN until May 1995; UPN–CDN from May 1995 (Note: After Juan Cruz Alli's split to form the CDN party, most of his regional ministers chose to stay loyal to UPN, with the regional government remaining in this situation until the end of the legislature.) | 1991 | King; Juan Carlos I (1975–2014) | |
| | Juan Cruz Alli (born 1942) | 23 September 1991 | 26 July 1995 | 3 years and 306 days | CDN | Alli; UPN until May 1995; UPN–CDN from May 1995 | 1991 | King; Juan Carlos I (1975–2014) | |
| | Javier Otano (born 1946) | 26 July 1995 | 19 June 1996 (resigned) | 329 days | PSN–PSOE | Otano; PSOE–CDN–EA | 1995 | King; Juan Carlos I (1975–2014) | |
| During this interval, Vice President Juan Cruz Alli served as acting officeholder. | | | | | | Otano; PSOE–CDN–EA | 1995 | King; Juan Carlos I (1975–2014) | |
| | Miguel Sanz (born 1952) | 18 September 1996 | 28 July 1999 | 14 years and 283 days | UPN | Sanz I UPN | 1995 | King; Juan Carlos I (1975–2014) | |
| | Miguel Sanz (born 1952) | 28 July 1999 | 30 June 2003 | 14 years and 283 days | UPN | Sanz II; UPN | 1999 | King; Juan Carlos I (1975–2014) | |
| | Miguel Sanz (born 1952) | 30 June 2003 | 14 August 2007 | 14 years and 283 days | UPN | Sanz III; UPN–CDN | 2003 | King; Juan Carlos I (1975–2014) | |
| | Miguel Sanz (born 1952) | 14 August 2007 | 28 June 2011 | 14 years and 283 days | UPN | Sanz IV; UPN–CDN until Oct 2009; UPN from Oct 2009 | 2007 | King; Juan Carlos I (1975–2014) | |
| | Yolanda Barcina (born 1960) | 28 June 2011 | 22 July 2015 | 4 years and 24 days | UPN | Barcina; UPN–PSOE until Jun 2012; UPN from Jun 2012 | 2011 | King; Juan Carlos I (1975–2014) | |
| | Yolanda Barcina (born 1960) | 28 June 2011 | 22 July 2015 | 4 years and 24 days | UPN | Barcina; UPN–PSOE until Jun 2012; UPN from Jun 2012 | 2011 | King; Felipe VI (2014–present) | |
| | Uxue Barkos (born 1964) | 22 July 2015 | 6 August 2019 | 4 years and 15 days | GBai | Barkos; GBai–EH Bildu–I–E | 2015 | King; Felipe VI (2014–present) | |
| | María Chivite (born 1978) | 6 August 2019 | 17 August 2023 | 6 years and 135 days | PSN–PSOE | Chivite I PSOE–GBai–Podemos | 2019 | King; Felipe VI (2014–present) | |
| | María Chivite (born 1978) | 17 August 2023 | Incumbent | 6 years and 135 days | PSN–PSOE | Chivite II; PSOE–GBai–Contigo | 2023 | King; Felipe VI (2014–present) | |
