= Regions of Spain (disambiguation) =

Regions of Spain can refer to:

- The autonomous communities of Spain, first-level political subdivisions of Spain
- A Spanish constitutional designation of certain autonomous communities (see nationalities and regions of Spain)
- The "historic regions" of Spain under the 1833 territorial division of Spain

== See also ==
- Nationalities and regions of Spain
- Nationalisms and regionalisms of Spain
- Provinces of Spain
