= Historical regions of Spain =

Historical regions of Spain can refer to:

- "Nationalities" (Spanish: nacionalidades) or "historical nationalities" (Spanish: nacionalidades históricas), a constitutional term used to refer to autonomous communities in Spain that are granted special status (see nationalities and regions of Spain).
- The "historical regions" (Spanish: regiones históricas) identified in the text of the 1833 territorial division of Spain.
- Historical (autonomous) communities (Spanish: comunidades históricas) or historical nationalities, referred to those Spanish regions that had voted for and approved a Statute of Autonomy before the unsuccessful military coup-d'état against the Second Spanish Republic that led to the Spanish Civil War (1936-1939); namely, those autonomous communities of Catalonia, Galicia and the Basque Country.
- Any historical kingdom or realm of Spain such as Castile, León, Navarre or Aragon.
