= Cala Llenya =

- Village
- Location of the village in Ibiza
- Coordinates: 39°1′0″N 1°35′38″E
- Country: Spain
- Region: Balearic Islands
- Time zone: UTC+1 (CET)
  - Summer (DST): UTC+2 (CEST)

Cala Llenya or Cala Lleña is a small resort village and beach on the northeastern coast of Ibiza. Cala Llenya and Cala Boix often have "choppy waves." To the north is Cala Mastella.

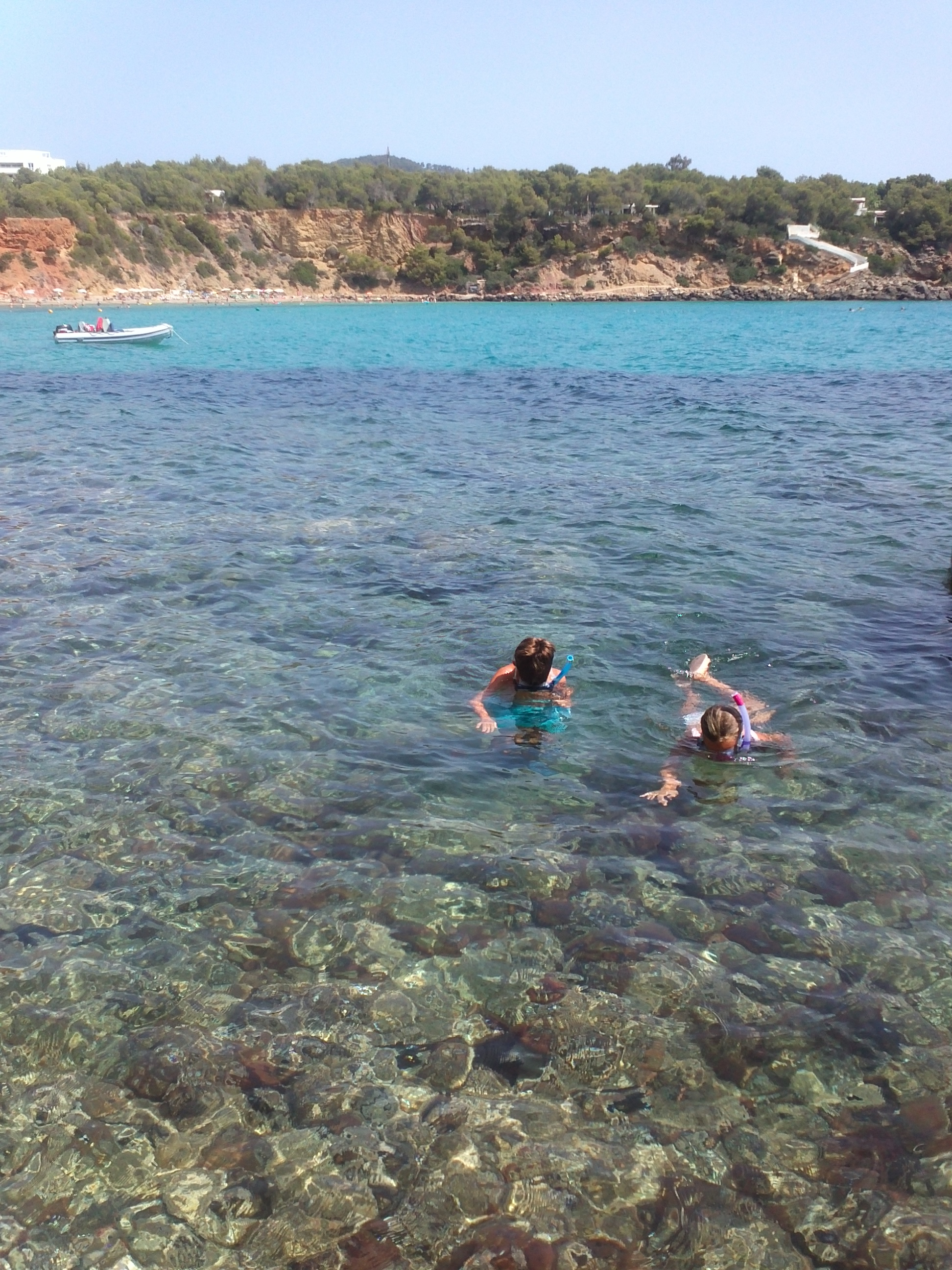
Cala Llenya
