= Josu Muguruza =

Basque-origin Spanish politician and journalist (1958–1989)

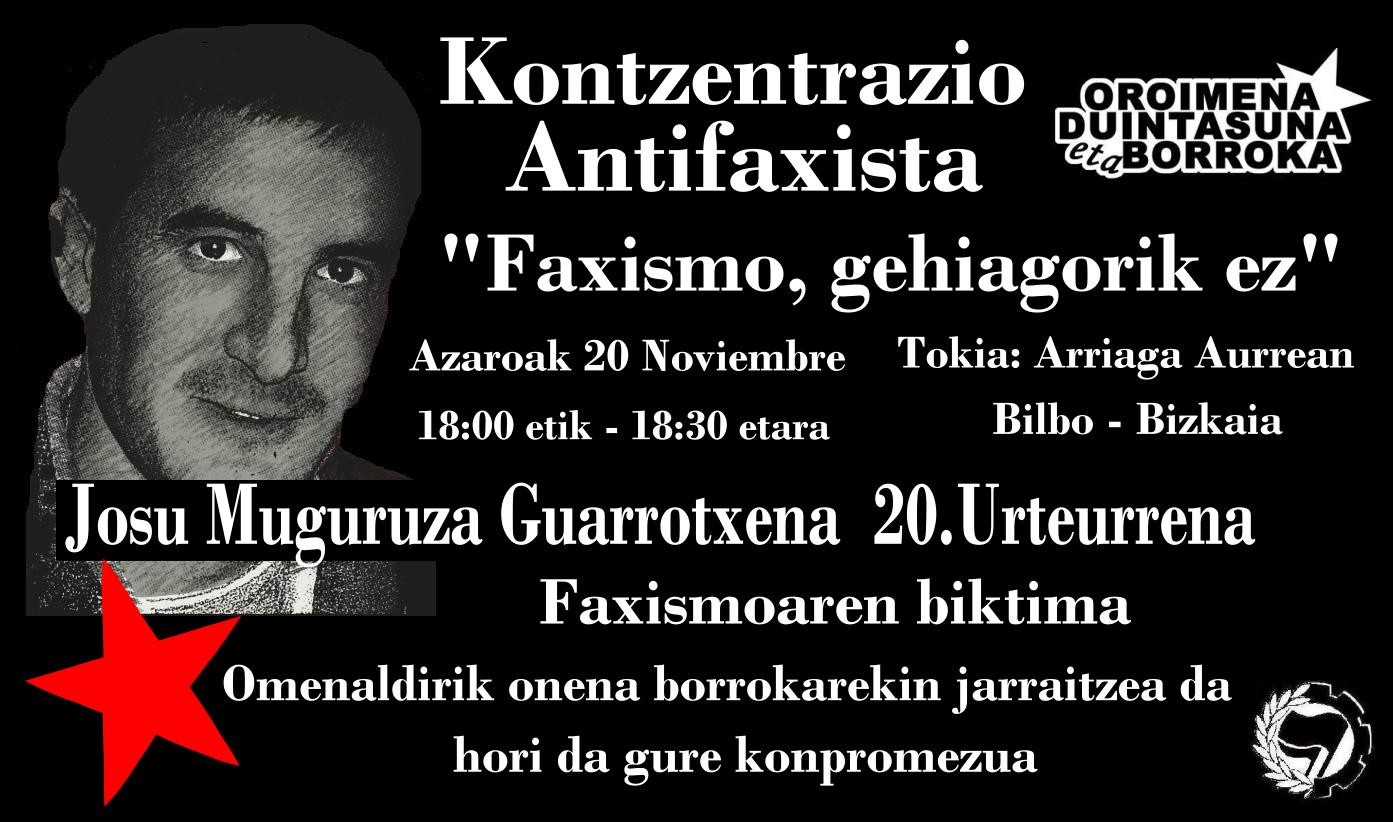
- Born: Josu Muguruza Guarrotxena; 1958; Bilbao, Spain
- Died: 20 November 1989 (aged 30–31); Madrid, Spain
- Cause of death: Assassination
- Burial place: Bilbao
- Occupation: Journalist
- Political party: Herri Batasuna

Josu Muguruza (1958 – 20 November 1989) was a Basque journalist and politician who was assassinated in Madrid on 20 November 1989 by members of the Spanish neo-fascist Bases Autónomas and GAL. Muguruza was among the leaders of Herri Batasuna, a left- wing Basque nationalist political party. He was about to serve at the Spanish Parliament for the party when he was killed.

== Biography ==
Muguruza was born in Bilbao in 1958. He received a bachelor's degree in information sciences. He was a journalist by profession and worked as an editor-in-chief of Egin newspaper.

Muguruza was a member of the Herri Batasuna and was part of the moderate group within the party who supported the peace talks between the Government of Spain and ETA. He was elected as a deputy from the Herri Batasuna in the 1989 general elections.

Muguruza had a daughter, Ane, born two weeks after the murder of her father.

=== Assassination ===
Muguruza was assassinated in Madrid on 20 November 1989 before he received his certificate of election. He was dining at a restaurant of Hotel Alcalá. The perpetrators were members of an anti-ETA group known as GAL. Ricardo Sáenz Ynestrillas, a member of the neo-fascist group, Spanish Social Movement (Movimiento Social Espanol), was arrested and tried for his alleged involvement in the killing of Muguruza, but soon released due to the lack of evidence.

Later seven individuals, including a former police officer, Ángel Duce Hernández, were arrested in late July 1990. Of them, Duce and Ricardo Saenz de Ynestrillas were the members of a right-wing group called National Anti-Terrorist Group of Spain and were put trial for killing Muguruza. Duce confessed in the trial that he and two other men murdered Muguruza for political reasons, but claimed that Ynestrillas was not involved in the attack. Duce was sentenced to 100 years for the murder of Muguruza. Duce was killed in a traffic accident in Alcorcón in August 1997 while he was using a six-day prison permit.

=== Funeral and legacy ===
A funeral ceremony was held for Muguruza in Bilbao on 23 November 1989. A monumental sculpture was erected in his honor in Bilbao.

The day, 20 November, Muguruza was assassinated has been commemorated by the Basque people since on the same day another Herri Batasuna leader Santiago Brouard was assassinated in 1984.
