= Social Democratic Party (Spain, 1976) =

Social Democratic Party Partido Social Demócrata
- Leader: Rafael Arias-Salgado; Francisco Fernández Ordóñez
- Founded: 1976
- Dissolved: 7 February 1978
- Merged into: Union of the Democratic Centre
- Ideology: Social democracy
- Political position: Centre-left
- National affiliation: Union of the Democratic Centre

The Social Democratic Party (Spanish: Partido Social Demócrata; PSD) was a Spanish social democratic political party, founded in 1976 during the democratic transition. The leaders of the PSD were Rafael Arias-Salgado and Francisco Fernández Ordóñez.

== History ==
The party was founded through the merge of 6 regional parties: the Social Democratic Group of the Valencian Country, the Social Democratic Party of Asturias, the Andalusian Social Democratic Party, the Basque Social Democratic Party, the Extremaduran Social Democratic Party and the Foral Social Democratic Party of Navarre.

The PSD joined the Union of the Democratic Centre (UCD) in 1977, gaining 14 seats in the 1977 Spanish general election. The party was dissolved in February 1978, fully joining the UCD.
