= Bases Autónomas =

Bases Autónomas Autonomous Bases
- Founder: Carlos Rodrigo Ruiz de Castro; Fernando Fernández Perdices
- Founded: 1983
- Dissolved: 1996
- Newspaper: La Peste Negra ¡A por ellos!
- Ideology: Spanish nationalism Neo-Nazism; Third Position
- Political position: Far-right

Party flag

Bases Autónomas (Bases Autonomes in French; "Autonomous Bases") was a Spanish neo-Nazi group, later moving to France, and known for its youthful membership and its violent rhetoric and propaganda.

== History ==
The group was formed in Madrid in 1983 under the leadership of Carlos Rodrigo Ruiz de Castro and Fernando Fernández Perdices (both lawyers) and the student Ignacio Alonso García. The group sought to inaugurate a much greater youth participation in far right politics. They published magazines that encouraged violent action, such as La Peste Negra (The black plague) and ¡A Por Ellos! (Get them!), and used the Celtic cross as their symbol. It has been described as "anarcho-fascist".

Membership was largely made up of football hooligan Ultras and racist skinheads who operated in small cells. The violence of the group, such as large scale attacks on anarchist and communist groups and several attacks on state institutions, attracted much police scrutiny and the Bases Autónomas were finally disbanded as an organization in the mid-1990s. However given the cell-based nature of the movement, which took its organisational, if not its ideological, impetus from anarchism, some individual cells continued to exist for some time after this.

The organization committed several terrorist actions, including the attack on the MPs of Herri Batasuna, killing the MP Josu Muguruza and severely injuring Iñaki Esnaola. In 1995 3 members of the group killed Ricardo Rodríguez García.

Others became heavily involved in the RAC music scene, helping to promote such Spanish bands as Estirpe Imperial, Division 250 and Klan.

== The French BBAA network: Rise, Fall and Revival ==
The French Bases Autonomes were founded on the 1st of August 1991 by members of Serge Ayoub's Jeunesses Nationalistes Révolutionnaires (JNR), a white power skinhead gang of the nationalist revolutionary tendency, following the schism within Troisième Voie, a French Third Position organisation founded in 1985 by a merger of the small neo-fascist Mouvement nationaliste révolutionnaire, which gathered former members of François Duprat's Revolutionary Nationalist Groups (GNR), with dissidents from the Parti des forces nouvelles.

The French Bases Autonomes were conceived after their Spanish model of the Bases Autonomas. The name of their ideological newsletter, Première Ligne, was also inspired by the newsletter Primera linea of the Juntas de Ofensiva Nacional-Sindicalista.

After his return to France in the middle of the first decade of the 21st century, Serge Ayoub revamped the concept of the Bases Autonomes which he called Bases Autonomes Durables (sustainable autonomous bases).

== See also ==
- Autonome Nationalisten
- Groupe Union Défense
- National-Anarchism

== Bibliography ==
- Casals, Xavier (1995). Neonazis en España. De las audiciones wagnerianas a los skinheads (1966-1995) (in Spanish). Barcelona: Grijalbo. ISBN 84-253-2804-7.
