= Abertzale Sozialista Komiteak =

Abertzale Sozialista Komiteak Patriotic Socialist Committees
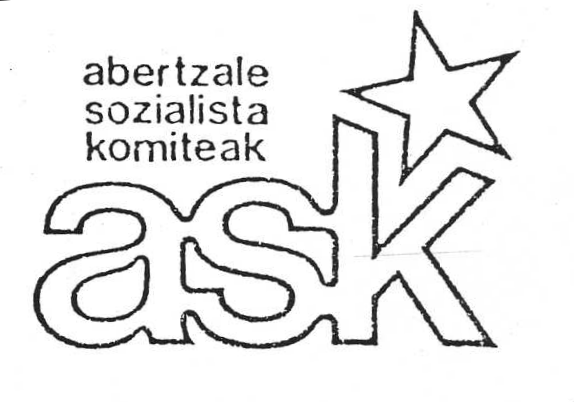
- Leader: Collective leadership
- Founded: 1976
- Dissolved: 1994
- Merger of: Herri Batzarrak
- Merged into: Herri Batasuna
- Youth wing: Jarrai
- Union affiliation: Langile Abertzaleen Batzordeak
- Ideology: Basque independence Workers' self-management Revolutionary socialism Feminism; Direct democracy Ecologism
- Political position: Radical left
- National affiliation: Herri Batasuna; Koordinadora Abertzale Sozialista

Party flag

Abertzale Sozialista Komiteak (English: Patriotic Socialist Committees; ASK) was a grassroots socialist and pro-self-management movement in the Basque Country. Its origins were the Herri Batzarak movement in Bizkaia.

== History ==
In 1977 ASK extended its activity throughout all Euskal Herria, and joined the Koordinadora Abertzale Sozialista. In 1978 ASK was one of the founding parties of Herri Batasuna. In the mid 80's the party had a debate over its ideology and space in the Basque Ezker abertzalea movement, defending a direct democracy model based in municipalities and neighborhood associations, prioritizing social movements to institutions. ASK created commissions dedicated to determined social movements, including Basque language, amnesty for the Basque prisoners, feminism, ecology, anti-militarism, popular culture or the fight against drugs, among others.

ASK disappeared in 1994, fully integrating themselves in Herri Batasuna.
