= Auzolan =

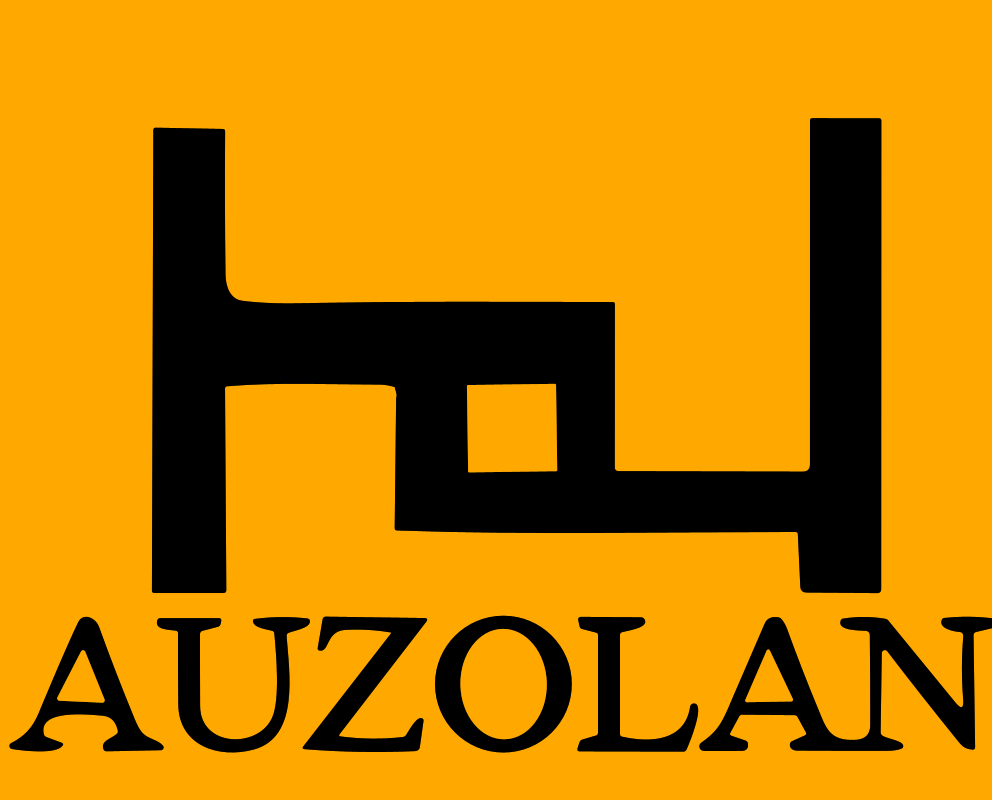
- Leader: Bixente Serrano Izko
- Founded: 1983; 42 years ago
- Dissolved: 1986; 39 years ago
- Merger of: Liga Komunista Iraultzailea; Langile Abertzale Iraultzaileen Alderdia; Nueva Izquierda
- Ideology: Socialism; Marxism; Basque nationalism Factions: Trotskyism; Libertarian Socialism
- Political position: Radical left

Auzolan (neighborhood labor in Basque) was a political coalition in the Southern Basque Country, created on 26 March 1983. It was a coalition between the Liga Komunista Iraultzailea (LKI), Langile Abertzale Iraultzaileen Alderdia (LAIA, one of the parties that founded Herri Batasuna) and Nueva Izquierda (a split Euskadiko Ezkerra), and had the support of the Communist Movement of Euskadi (EMK). The spokesperson of Auzolan was Bixente Serrano Izko.

== History ==
In March 1983 Auzolan was presented, with the intention of presenting candidates in the municipal elections of that year in some municipalities of Navarre, as well as in the elections to the Parliament of Navarre. In these elections Auzolan obtained 8,356 votes (3.46% of the total), but no seats, although the coalition exceeded by two thousand votes their rivals of Euskadiko Ezkerra.

In the elections to the Basque Parliament the following year Auzolan presented a list headed by Iñaki Pérez Beotegi, Wilson. Auzolan obtained 10,462 votes (0.98%) and no seats.

On May 30, 1986 Auzolan self-dissolved, but the Navarran branch continued to exist, as Batzarre.
