= José Luis Monge Recalde =

Spanish politician (1934–2026)

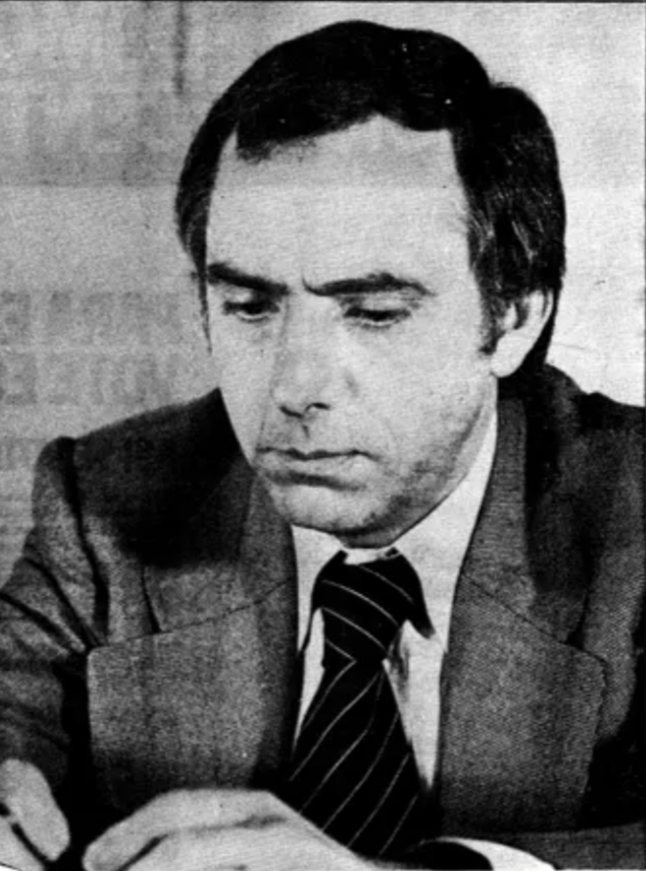

Member of the Senate of Spain for Navarre
- In office 15 June 1977 – 31 August 1982

Member of the Parliament of Navarre
- In office 10 May 1983 – 10 June 1987

Personal details
- Born: 1934 Alhama de Aragón, Spain
- Died: 8 July 2026 (aged 91–92) Pamplona, Spain
- Party: PSD; UCD
- Education: University of Valladolid (Lic.)
- Occupation: Lawyer

José Louis Monge Recalde (1934 – 8 July 2026) was a Spanish politician. A member of the Social Democratic Party and the Union of the Democratic Centre, he served in the Senate from 1977 to 1982 and in the Parliament of Navarre from 1983 to 1987.

Monge died in Pamplona on 8 July 2026.
