= Party of the Revolutionary Patriotic Workers =

Party of the Revolutionary Patriotic Workers Langile Abertzale Iraultzaileen Alderdia
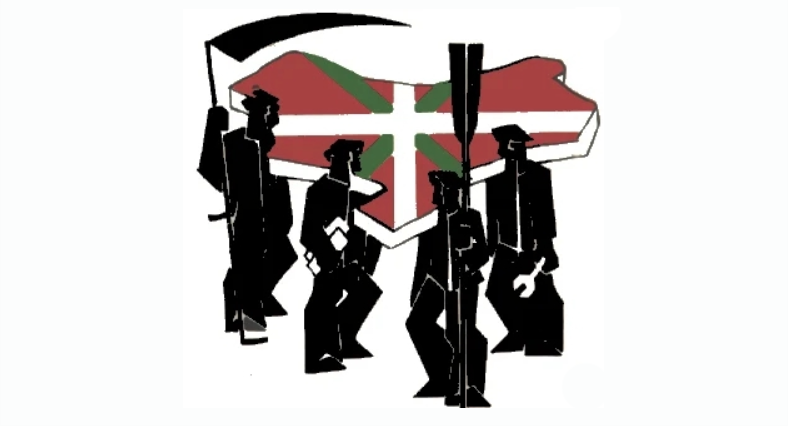
- President: Gabriel Petrikorena
- Founded: 1974
- Dissolved: 1984
- Headquarters: Iruña
- Newspaper: Sugarra
- Trade union affiliation: Langile Abertzale Komiteak
- Ideology: Abertzale Left; Libertarian Socialism; Autonomous Marxism; Independentism
- Political position: Left-wing
- National affiliation: Koordinadora Abertzale Sozialista (1975-1979); Herri Batasuna (1978-1980); Auzolan (1983-1984)

Langile Abertzale Iraultzaileen Alderdia (English: Party of the Revolutionary Patriotic Workers, LAIA), was a Communist political party of the Southern Basque Country and Basque nationalist ideology that was born during the last years of the Francoist State as a result of a division of ETA. Its acronym, laia is also the Basque name of an agricultural tool.

LAIA participated in the formation of on the Koordinadora Abertzale Sozialista (KAS) and in the Herri Batasuna (HB) coalition, that left in 1980, joining Auzolan in 1983. LAIA disappeared in the mid-1980s. The party never officially registered in the register of political parties of the Interior Ministry, and always participated in elections through coalitions.
