= Foral Democratic Union =

Foral Democratic Union Unión Demócrata Foral
- Leader: Jaime del Burgo
- Founded: 1987
- Dissolved: 1991
- Merged into: Navarrese People's Union
- Ideology: Regionalism; Christian democracy Liberalism

Foral Democratic Union (Spanish: Unión Demócrata Foral, UDF) was an electoral alliance in Navarre, formed by the People's Democratic Party (PDP), the Liberal Party and the Foral Democratic Party ahead of the 1987 Navarrese regional election. It merged into the Navarrese People's Union (UPN) in 1991.
