= Juan Manuel Arza =

Spanish politician and lawyer (1932–2019)

President of Navarre
- In office 29 September 1980 – 14 January 1984
- Preceded by: Jaime Ignacio del Burgo
- Succeeded by: Jaime Ignacio del Burgo

Personal details
- Born: 17 October 1932 Estella-Lizarra, Navarre, Spain
- Died: 15 March 2019 (aged 86) Estella-Lizarra, Navarre, Spain
- Occupation: Lawyer

Juan Manuel Arza Muñuzuri (17 October 1932 – 15 March 2019) was a Spanish politician and lawyer from Navarre. He served as the second President of the Government of Navarre from 29 September 1980 until 14 January 1984.
