= Nationalities and regions of Spain =

Constitutional status of the Spanish regions with devolved powers

Spain is a diverse country integrated by contrasting entities with varying economic and social structures, languages, and historical, political and cultural traditions. The Spanish constitution responds ambiguously to the claims of historic nationalities (such as the right of self-government) while proclaiming a common and indivisible homeland of all Spaniards.

The terms nationalities (Note: Spanish and Galician: nacionalidades, Basque: nazionalitateak, Catalan or Valencian: nacionalitats) and historical nationalities, (Note: Spanish and Galician: nacionalidades históricas, Basque: nazionalitate historikoak, Catalan or Valencian: nacionalitats històriques) (Note: New terms have been proposed such as "national character", "national realities" and "nations".) though never officially defined, refer to territories whose inhabitants have a strong historically constituted identity; or, more specifically, certain autonomous communities whose statute of autonomy—their basic institutional legislation—recognizes their historical and cultural identity.

In Spanish jurisprudence, the term nationality appears for the first time in the current constitution, approved in 1978 after much debate in the Spanish Parliament. Although it was explicitly understood that the term referred to Galicia, the Basque Country, and Catalonia, the constitution does not specify any communities by name. Between the strong centralist position inherited from Franco's regime and the nationalist position of the Galicians, Basques, and Catalans, a consensus developed around this term. It was applied in the respective statutes of autonomy once all nationalities and regions acceded to self-government or autonomy, and were constituted as autonomous communities.

Several of the writers of the current Spanish Constitution have said that the concept of nationality is synonymous with nation. However, the Spanish Constitutional Court has explicitly ruled against this interpretation.

Currently, the term "nationality" is used in reference to Aragon, Valencian Community, the Balearic Islands, the Canary Islands and Andalusia. The rest of the autonomous communities (Castile-La Mancha, Murcia, La Rioja, Extremadura) are defined as historical regions of Spain. Asturias, Cantabria, and Castile and León are referred to as "historical communities". Navarre is defined as a chartered community in the re-institution of its medieval charters, and the Community of Madrid is defined as neither a nationality nor a region, but a community created in the nation's interest as the seat of the nation's capital. Catalonia was originally defined as a "nation" in the Statute of Autonomy of Catalonia of 2006. However, the Constitutional Court of Spain declared that unconstitutional. The court considered that the references made, in the preamble of the statute, to Catalonia to a nation "lack legal effectiveness".

== Historical background ==
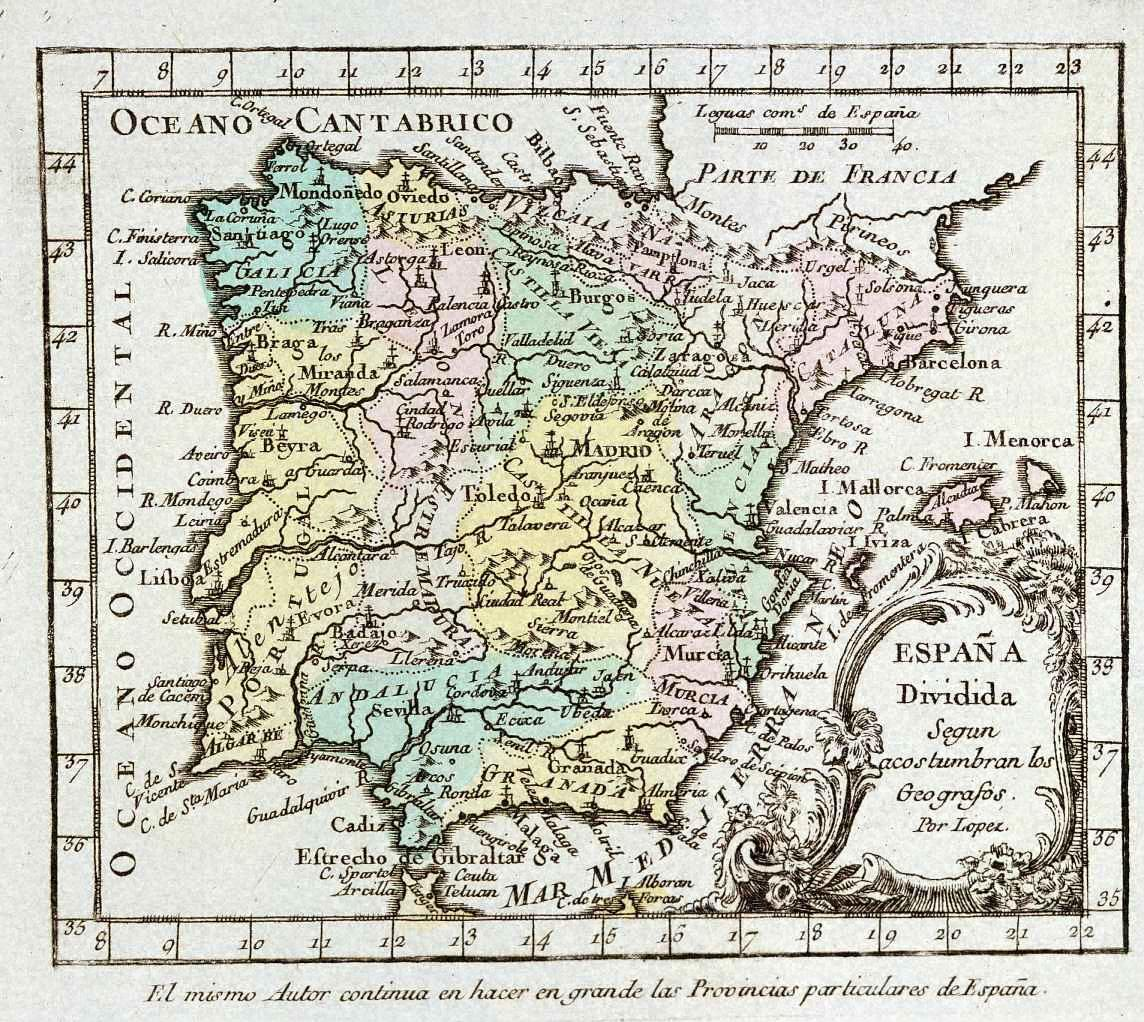
Map of Spain in 1757

The formation of Spain can be viewed as an alliance and progressive union of several peninsular kingdoms, and nationalist or regionalist tradition in Spain has historical roots in such beginnings. No serious attempt was made to centralise the administration until the reforms of the eighteenth century, to become a nation state.

By the beginning of the nineteenth century, though, the Spanish government had become strongly centralised, as was the case in certain other European nations. The State did not recognise the nation's regional diversity. Later during this same century, Catalonia and the Basque Country became rapidly industrialised and were areas of swift progress in establishing commercial capitalism. These changes occurred much more slowly in the rest of the country, which remained largely agricultural. Nationalistic sentiments began to grow in the more industrialized areas. Some writers of the time expressed their concepts of a Catalan or Basque fatherland, or even nationhood. These two nationalist movements had much in common, in that both arose in areas that enjoyed higher levels of prosperity and literacy, were the only areas in the country to develop modern industry, and each possessed a distinct and independent linguistic tradition. Activists worked to revive use of both the Catalan and the Basque languages, including publication of literature in these languages. A similar revival began of the Galician language. Scholars began to explore the histories of these regions, to tell their own founding stories: Catalonia rediscovered her prowess as a Mediterranean Medieval empire within the Crown of Aragon, and the Basque Country focused on the mystery of its origins.

Under medieval and early modern charters, several parts of Spain, including the Principality of Catalonia and the Basque provinces, had exercised a considerable level of independence, even in the period of Habsburg Spain; however, later Bourbon Spain such independence was lost and the Basque Country and Navarre exercised only fiscal autonomy. The larger economic development that occurred in these historically delimited ethnic communities enhanced the regions' own identities.

In the early twentieth century, nationalist discourse in Galicia, Catalonia and especially in the Basque country was infused with racialist elements, as these ethnicities defined themselves as distinct from the peoples of the center and south of Spain. With the growth of nationalistic sentiments, demands by these groups for self-government also grew. In some sectors, activists demanded outright independence.

The appearance of the so-called peripheral nationalism in the aforementioned regions of Spain occurred in a period when Spaniards began to look into their own concepts of nationhood. In the traditionalist view, religion had been integral to defining the Spanish nation, intrinsically and traditionally Catholic, and strongly monarchical. In a later, liberal view, sovereignty was considered to reside in the nation and to be expressed in the people, as opposed to the monarch. Some activists sought a uniform centralised State, while others preferred decentralization or republicanism.

Spain experimented with decentralisation during the First Spanish Republic (1873-1874), but social and political chaos, which had started even before the change of regime with a change of monarchical houses, led to its failure. At the beginning of the twentieth century, the two political discourses of Spanish nationalism, the traditional and the liberal, continued to be present and opposing, advocating for different political regimes. However, the appearance of peripheral nationalisms, namely the Basque and Catalan nationalistic movements, produced the unification of many Spanish nationalists as a counter-force, and Spanish nationalism became a dialectical struggle between the center and the periphery.

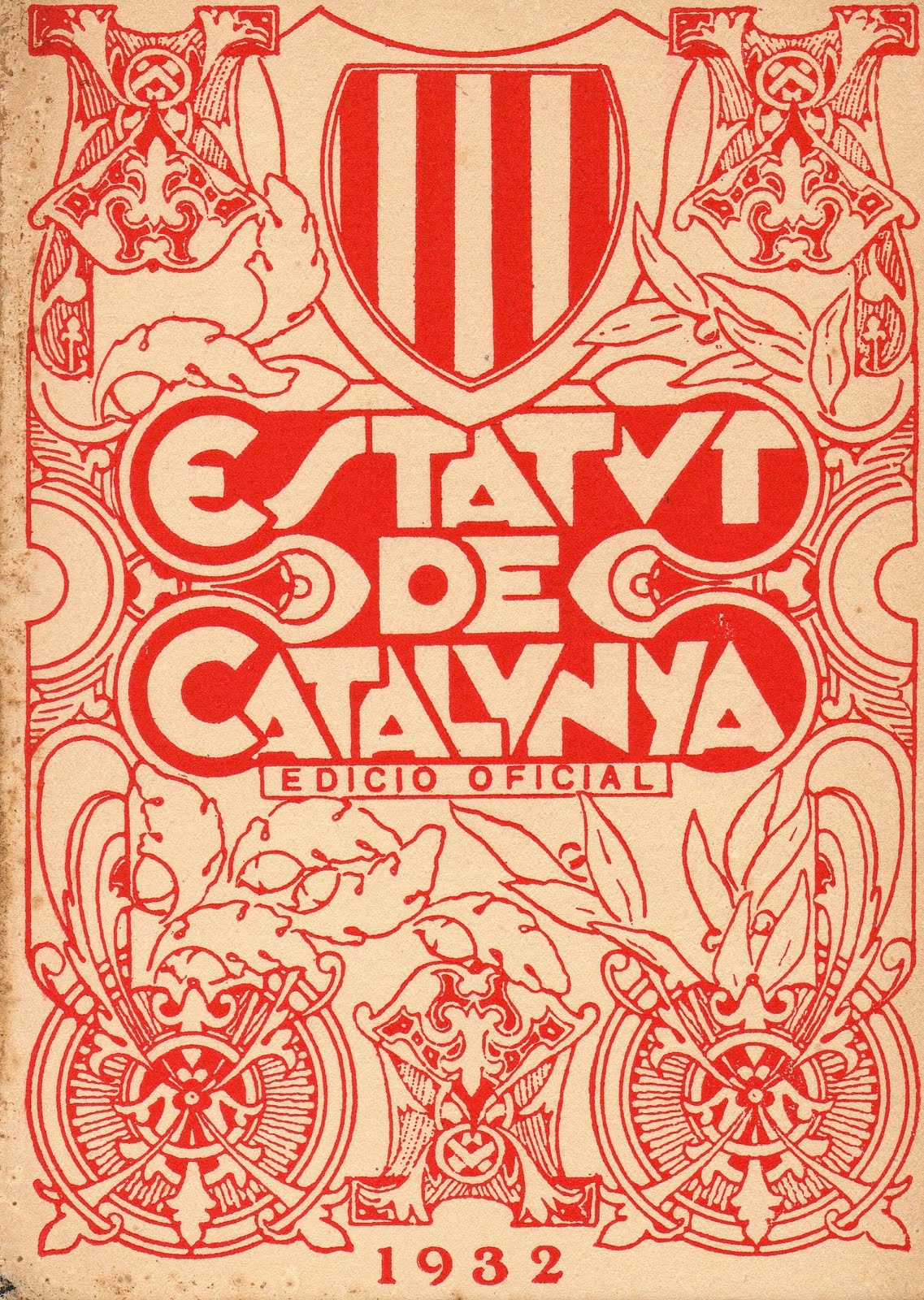
Cover of Catalonia's 1932 Statute of Autonomy, during the Second Spanish Republic

During the final stages of the turno pacífico, a staged pacific alternation of power between liberals and conservatives in the Spanish Parliament, Catalonia was granted a limited form of self-government. The Commonwealth of Catalonia (Catalan: Mancomunitat de Catalunya) was established in 1913, with its own Regional Assembly. The Assembly drafted a Statute of Autonomy that was, however, rejected by the General Courts (the Spanish Parliament). The Commonwealth of Catalonia was dissolved during the dictatorship of Primo de Rivera in 1923.

In 1931, the Second Spanish Republic was established, and a new liberal constitution allowed the "regions" of Spain to attain self-government. It created the "autonomous region" as a first-order administrative division. Catalonia was the first to approve a Statute of Autonomy, later sanctioned by the Spanish Parliament. Its Generalitat, the Catalan institutions of government that had operated since medieval times until the early eighteenth century, was restored. The Basque Country and Galicia each sought autonomy in 1936, but only the Statute of Autonomy of the first was approved before the Spanish Civil War erupted.

After the war, Franco's regime (1939–1975) forcefully enforced centralism in an effort to establish and preserve the unity of the Spanish nation. His attempts to fight separatism with heavy-handed but sporadic repression and his oftentimes severe suppression of language and regional identities backfired: the demands for democracy became intertwined with demands for the recognition of a pluralistic vision of the Spanish nationhood.

After Franco died, Spain entered into a phase of transition towards democracy. All democratic groups were forced to face the Catalan, Basque and Galician question. On 11 September 1977, more than one million people marched in the streets of Barcelona (Catalonia) demanding "llibertat, amnistia i estatut d'autonomia", "liberty, amnesty and [a] Statute of Autonomy", creating the biggest demonstration in post-war Europe. A law was passed that allowed for the creation of pre-autonomías, "pre-autonomies" or provisional regional governments for all regions, the "historical nationalities" included. Catalonia was the first to be so constituted, and it again revived the Generalitat. The Basque Country quickly followed suit.

In the 1977 election to the first democratically elected Parliament since the times of the Republic, regional Catalan socialists (Socialists' Party of Catalonia) and Basque nationalists (Basque Nationalist Party) both won significant positions in representing their regions and their aspirations. This newly elected Parliament was entrusted to formulate a new constitution.

== "Nationalities" in the constitution of 1978 ==
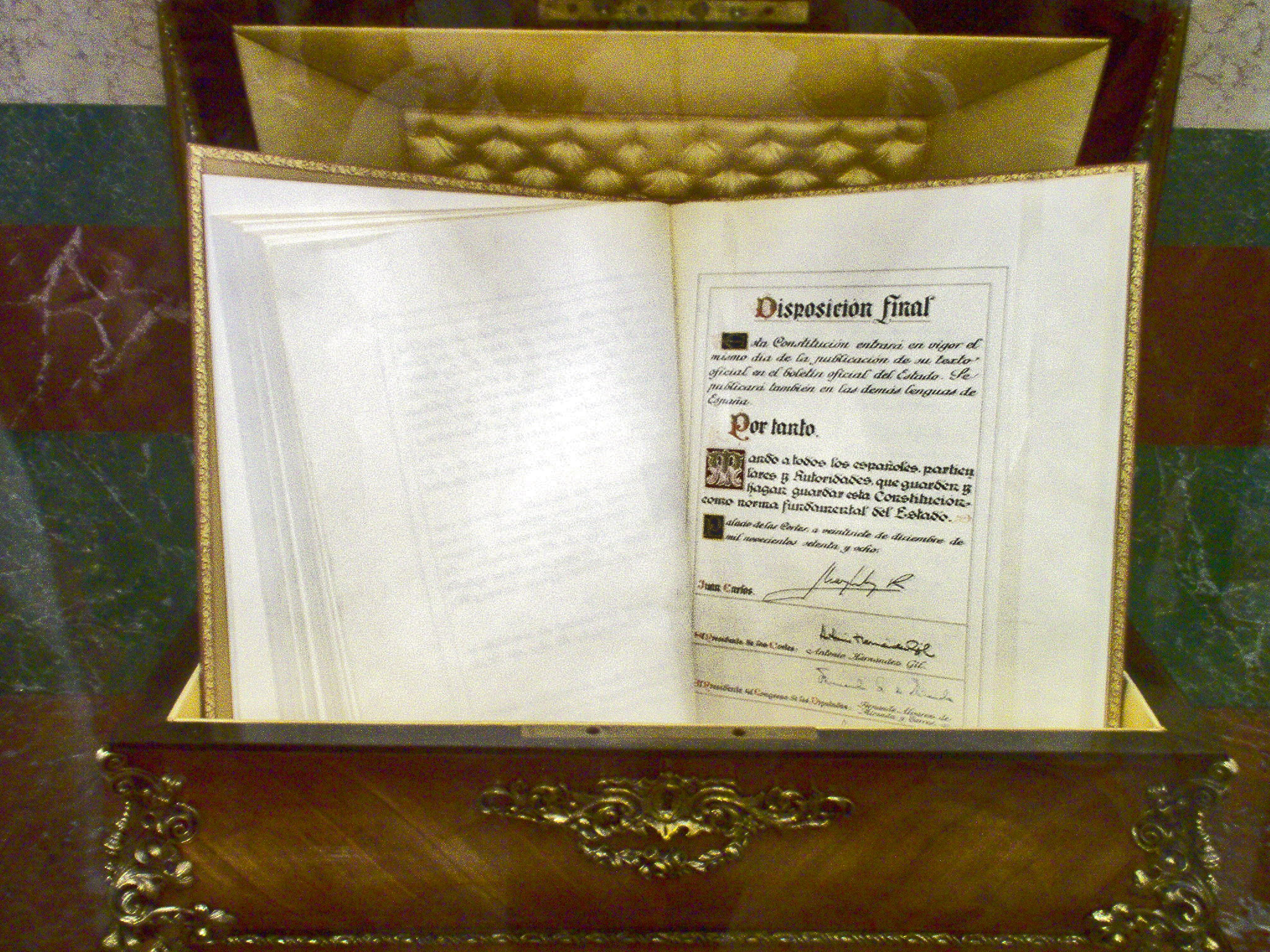
Spanish Constitution of 1978

The demands for the recognition of the distinctiveness of Catalonia, the Basque Country and Galicia within the Spanish State became one of the most important challenges for the newly elected Parliament. In fact, the writing of the second article, in which the "nationalities and regions" of Spain were recognized, was the most hotly debated in the Parliament. Its acceptance was not smooth: the right vigorously opposed it, while the nationalists and the left firmly objected to leaving it out. The natural corollary to debating the term "nationalities" was debating the term "nation". At the end of the spectrum there were those who thought the term "nationalities" was unnecessary, or that there was only one "nation" and "nationality"—Spanish—while at the opposite end of the spectrum there were those who advocated for defining Spain as a plurinational State, that is, a State integrated by several nations. In the end, the second article was passed along with the term "nationalities" but firmly stressing the indivisible unity of the Spanish nation. It reads:

The Constitution is based on the indissoluble unity of the Spanish nation, the common and indivisible country of all Spaniards; it recognises and guarantees the right to autonomy of the nationalities and regions of which it is composed, and the solidarity amongst them all

— Second Article of the Spanish Constitution of 1978

The article united two historical trends in Spain: centralism and federalism, and in the words of one of the seven fathers of the Constitution, Jordi Solé Tura it was "[...] an authentic point of encounter between different concepts of the Spanish nation [...] In it, two great notions of Spain merge." It aimed to give an answer to the nationalistic aspirations that had been silenced during the four decades of Franco's dictatorial regime.

The constitution itself did not define the term, despite the diverse meanings and interpretations that its proponents and opponents had—ranging from "an expression of historical and cultural identities [...] in the superior unity of Spain" (Landelino Lavilla, from the Union of the Democratic Centre), "communities with a prominent cultural, historical or political personality" (Rafael Arias-Salgado, from the Union of the Democratic Centre), all the way to making it equivalent to "nation", (Manuel Fraga from the People's Alliance, in stern opposition to the term "nationalities" precisely because of its alleged synonymity with "nation") or defining it as a "nation without a State [...] within the plurinational reality of Spain [...] as a Nation of nations" (Miguel Roca Junyent, from the Convergence and Union).

The particular meaning that the term "nationalities" was to acquire in Spanish politics, in reference to regions, created some confusion with the concept of "nationality" with regard to citizenship. The matter was especially confused when the latter was defined in the 11th article of the constitution. It was suggested that the term "nationality" be changed to "citizenship" in the 11th article, but it was considered that the terms nationality and citizenship are not completely synonymous, as it is common in other European legislations.

The Preamble to the constitution explicitly stated that it is the Nation's will to protect "all Spaniards and the peoples of Spain in the exercise of their human rights, cultures traditions, languages and institutions". This was a significant move, since for the "historical nationalities" part of their distinctiveness lies on their own regional languages. Furthermore, the nation became openly multilingual, declaring Castilian:that is, Spanish as the official language of the entire country, but declaring that the "other Spanish languages" will also be official in their respective autonomous communities. The third article ends up declaring that the "richness of the distinct linguistic modalities of Spain represent a patrimony which will be the object of special respect and protection."

== The State of Autonomies ==
The constitution sought to grant self-government to nationalities and, if desired, regions, as autonomous communities, while distinguishing between them in the powers granted and the path to self-government. The three "historic nationalities" (Catalonia, Galicia and the Basque Country) were granted a simplified "fast-track" process, while the rest of the regions had to follow a specific set of requirements. Thus the process was purposely intended to be asymmetrical in nature. The autonomous communities were to be formed from the existing provinces, a division of the centralising regime of the early nineteenth century: an autonomous community could be created by a province or group of provinces with common historical, cultural and economical features. Yet, the outcome was not predictable; the constitution created a process for devolution, but it differed from other legislations in two main aspects. First, it did not specify the name or number of the autonomous communities that would integrate the Spanish nation, and secondly, the process was voluntary in nature: the regions themselves had the option of choosing to attain self-government or not. This unique process of territorial administration was called the "State of Autonomies". Though highly decentralised, this system is not a federation, in that there was still ambiguity with regards to the power attributed to the regions, even though they can still negotiate them with the central government.

While the constitution was still being drafted, there was a demonstration in Andalusia, which sought to be recognised as a "nationality" as well, and to be granted self-government also through a rapid process. This opened a phase that was dubbed in Spanish as "café para todos", "coffee for all", meaning that all regions would be "served the same": that all nationalities and regions would accede to self-government in roughly the same degree, if at different paces. Catalonia, the Basque Country and Galicia acceded to autonomy via the fast-track route established in the 151st article of the constitution, with all competencies granted, because in the past they had approved a Statute by referendum and they had already established a pre-autonomic provisional government. Andalusia began this process after a referendum in 1980. The other regions had the opportunity to accede to autonomy via the slower route established in the 143rd article, with a lower level of competencies, during a provisional period of five years. After this period, there was to be a progressive transference of competencies, with the aim of roughly equalizing all communities. One particular exception was granted to both the Basque Country and Navarre: their fueros or "medieval charters", which had granted them fiscal autonomy, were restored. Despite having a Basque-speaking minority, the province of Navarre chose not to join the soon-to-be formed autonomous community of the Basque Country. Instead, it followed a different route of devolution due to the reinstitution of the medieval charters, and is thus known as a "chartered community", as opposed to an "autonomous community".

Both the Basque Country and Navarre are considered "communities of chartered regime", meaning they have fiscal autonomy: they collect their own taxes and send a prearranged amount to the central government. The other communities are considered to be "common regime"; currently, they administer their own taxes only partially. The taxes collected from "common regime" communities are administered centrally and distributed among them all to achieve fiscal equalisation.

== Current state of affairs ==
Nationalities of Spain as defined in their statutes Nationality with autonomy statute dating back to the Second Spanish Republic Nationality defined in Spain's modern statute Other Autonomous Communities

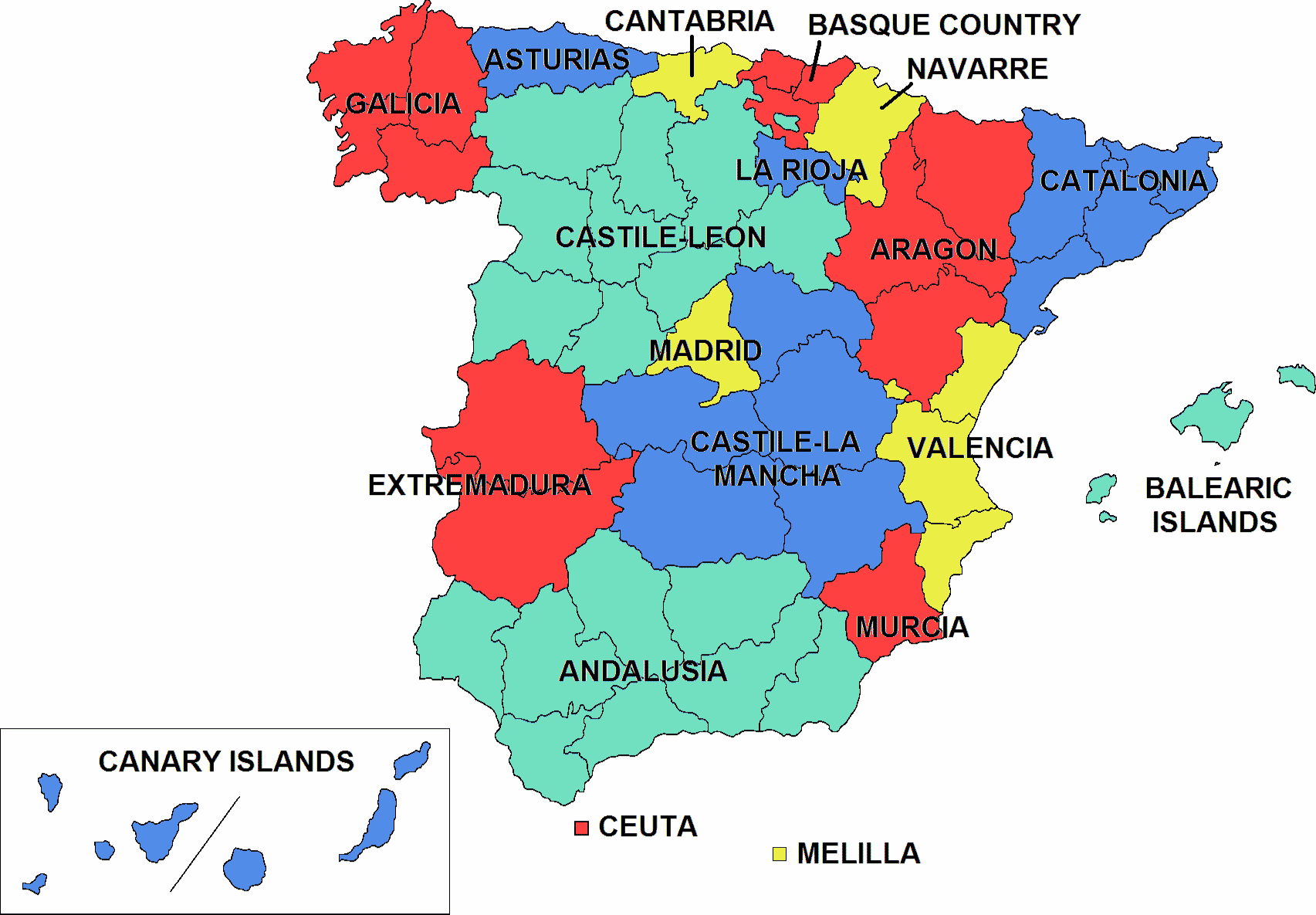
General depiction of Spain's autonomous communities and their subdivisions in provinces

The "autonomic process", whereby the nationalities and regions would accede to autonomy, was partially concluded in 1983, when 17 autonomous communities covering the entire territory of Spain were created. (The process finally concluded with the creation of two autonomous cities in Northern Africa, Ceuta and Melilla.) All autonomous communities follow the provincial limits established in the 1833 territorial division of Spain: no province has been partitioned between communities. Moreover, many communities roughly coincide with the pre-provincial historical regions of the sixteenth and seventeenth centuries, which in turn reflected to some extent some of the historical medieval kingdoms or administrative regions of the past.

On the other hand, some autonomous communities are new creations. For example, autonomy was granted to Cantabria and La Rioja, both of which were historically part of Castile. Despite the lack of historical basis for both communities, and the fact that the Spanish government favored their integration in the larger Castile-León, the local population overwhelmingly supported the new entities. In Cantabria, one of the leading intellectual figures in 19th-century Spain, Marcelino Menéndez Pelayo, had already rejected a Castilian identity for his region as far back as 1877, instead favouring integration with its western neighbour, Asturias:

¡Y quién sabe si antes de mucho, enlazadas hasta oficialmente ambas provincias, rota la ilógica división que a los montañeses nos liga a Castilla, sin que seamos, ni nadie nos llame castellanos, podrá la extensa y riquísima zona cántabro-asturiana formar una entidad tan una y enérgica como la de Cataluña, luz y espejo hoy de todas las gentes ibéricas!

And who knows whether before too long, once both provinces are officially linked—breaking the illogical division that binds us highlanders to Castile, without us being, or anyone calling us Castilian—might the vast and incredibly rich Cantabrian-Asturian region form an entity as unified and vibrant as that of Catalonia, today a beacon and mirror of all the Iberian peoples!

The province of Madrid was also separated from New Castile and constituted as an autonomous community. This was partly in recognition of Madrid's status as the capital of the nation, but also because it was originally excluded from the pre-autonomic agreements that created the community of Castile-La Mancha, to which it naturally belonged. Some peripheral nationalists still complain that the creation of many regions was an attempt to break down their own 'national unity' by a sort of gerrymandering, thus blurring the distinctiveness of their own nationalities.

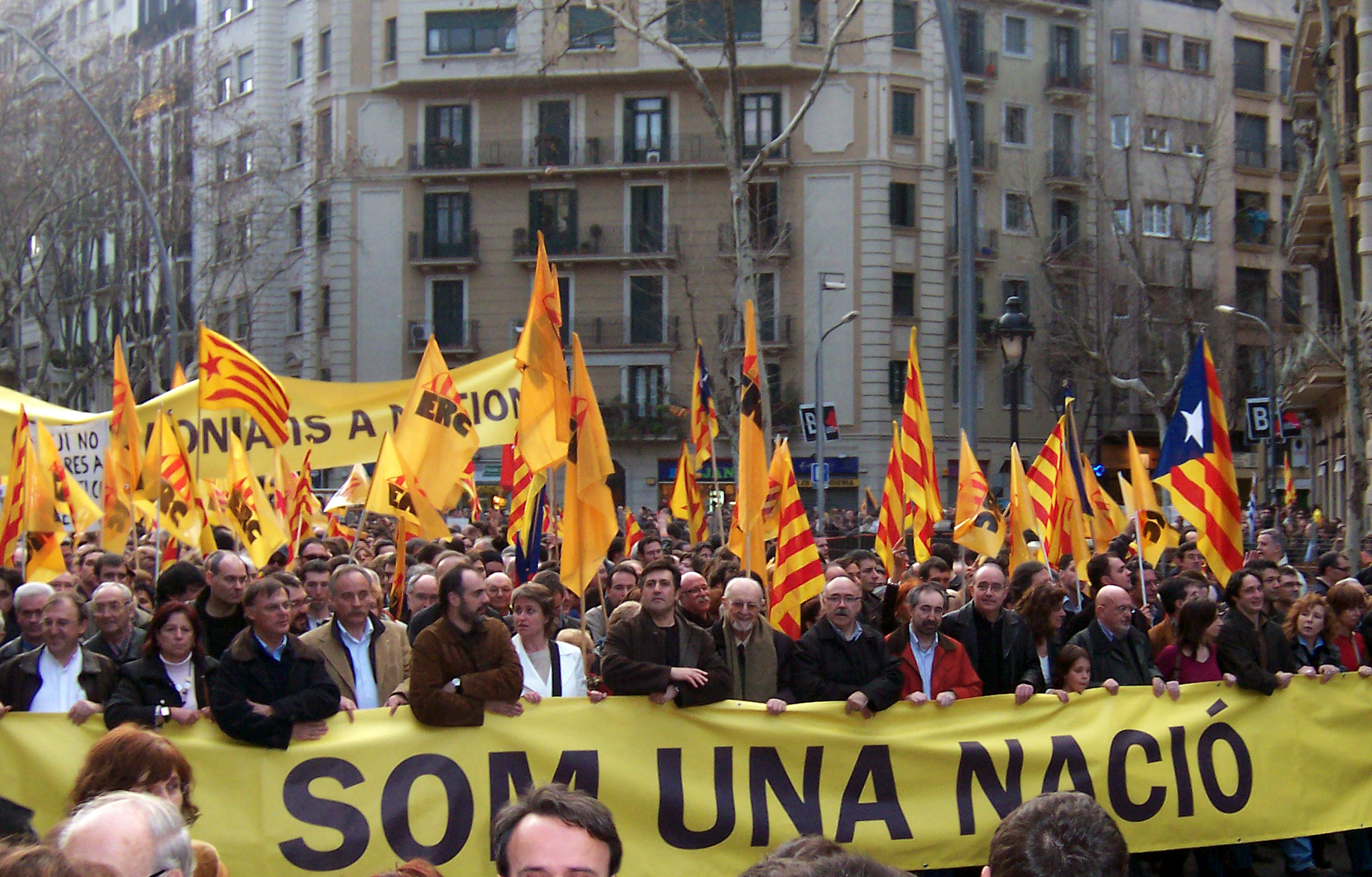
2006 demonstration led by Republican Left Party of Catalonia in favor of using the term "nation" to define Catalonia in its Statute of Autonomy

As competencies were eventually transferred to all communities in roughly the same degree, some nationalists see little practical distinction between "nationality" and "region", regardless of how the autonomous community defines itself, a dilution that is welcomed by some political parties at the national level. In fact, other communities are also identified as "historical nationalities", including Andalusia, Aragon, the Balearic Islands, the Canary Islands, and the Valencian Community. Also, most communities that do not enjoy fiscal autonomy: the "common regime communities" typically tend to follow Catalonia's lead in their demands for more competencies or self-government. This has caused a movement for further recognition of the distinctiveness of the "historical nationalities" as "nations", often resuscitating the debate between "nationality" and "nation" or the concept of a "plurinational State".

In the Basque Country in 2003, the regional government proposed a plan whereby the autonomous community would become a "free associated State" of Spain, which was later rejected by the Spanish Parliament. In 2006, the Catalan Parliament, in approving a new Statute of Autonomy, chose to define Catalonia not as a "nationality" but explicitly as a "nation", by a large majority. Similar proposals were made in Andalusia. The Spanish Parliament, which must ratify all Statutes of Autonomy, removed the article that defined Catalonia as a "nation", but made a reference in the Preamble of the document to the "fact" that the Catalan Parliament had chosen to so define Catalonia, but that the constitution recognises her "national reality" as a "nationality". The existence of two chartered communities with fiscal autonomy has led to discontent in Catalonia, which demands the same privilege and transparency. It is one of the main net contributors of fiscal equalization to which only communities of common-regime are subject: it has a large fiscal deficit, whereas in Galicia and Andalusia, which are among the biggest net beneficiaries of such centrally managed funding, no such demand has been made.

The "nationalities" have also played a key role in national (or "State-wide") politics. On the few occasions where no major party has achieved an absolute majority in the Congress of Deputies, there have been agreements with the so-called "nationalist" (i.e. "regionalist" or "peripheral nationalist") parties present there. On these occasions, no coalitions for government have been made, but instead a minority government has been formed that receives support from the "nationalist" parties to approve the budget and other laws. This has sometimes led to further concessions being made to the peripheral nationalities.

The new framework of "autonomies" has served to legitimise the Spanish state even within the "nationalities", more so in Catalonia and Galicia than in the Basque Country. (Legitimacy is still a question amongst some Basque nationalists: the Basque Country was the only community where the Spanish Constitution in 1978 was not approved by the majority of its constituents in the national referendum.) In practical terms, the majority of the population has been satisfied with the framework of devolution since the restoration of democracy, even if some still aspire for further recognition of the distinctiveness of the nationalities or for the expansion of their self-government. In all three "historical nationalities", there is still a sizable minority, more so in Catalonia than in the Basque Country and Galicia, calling for the establishment of a true federal State in Spain or advocating for their right to self-determination and independence.

Since it began in 2008, the Spanish economic crisis has produced different reactions in the different communities. On the one hand, politicians in some communities that are not "nationalities", mostly governed by the centre-right Popular Party, are considering the return of some devolved powers back to the central government. On the other hand, in Catalonia, the strenuous fiscal situation and the severe austerity measures enacted by the regional government have caused great discontent in the population, many of whom view the "unfairness" of the large fiscal deficit as aggravating the situation. This, in turn, has led many who are not necessarily separatist but who are enraged by the financial deficit to support secession. In recent polls, support for independence has doubled from the mid-20% in 2008 to nearly 50% by September 2012, although support for independence drops to the mid-30% if more options are given in the poll, with nearly as many favoring the establishment of a true federal system in Spain. This surge in support for independence was evidenced during the celebration of the National Day of Catalonia on 11 September 2012, when about 600,000 to two million people marched on the streets of Barcelona rallying for independence, one of the largest demonstrations in Spanish history.

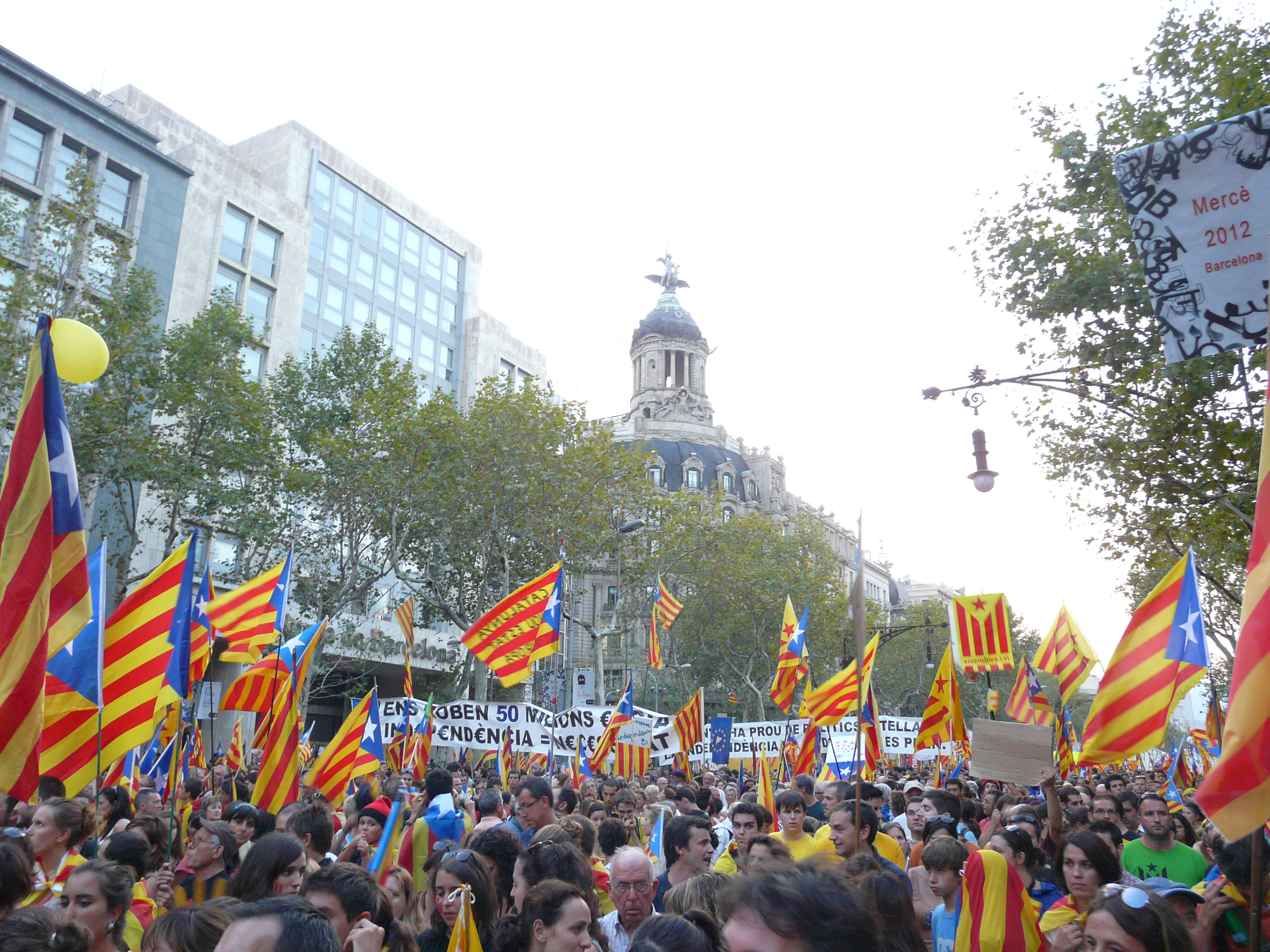
The 2012 Catalan independence demonstration

Following the rally, the president of Catalonia, Artur Mas, in a previously scheduled meeting with the prime minister of Spain, Mariano Rajoy, requested and was denied (on the basis of its purported unconstitutionality), a change in the taxation system in Catalonia that would have made it similar to that of the two communities of chartered regime. The week after the meeting, Mas called for the dissolution of the Catalan Parliament and for early elections to be held on 25 November 2012. Before its dissolution, the Catalan parliament approved a bill calling for the next legislature to allow Catalonia to exercise its right of self-determination by holding a "referendum or consultation" during the next four years in which the people would decide whether to become a new independent and sovereign State. This parliamentary decision was approved by a large majority of deputies: 84 voted affirmative, 21 voted negative and 25 abstained. The deputy prime minister of Spain, Soraya Sáenz de Santamaría, declared that the central government would exercise all "legal instruments" (current legislation requires the executive government or the Congress of Deputies to call for or sanction a binding referendum) to block any such attempt. The leaders of the opposition, in the Catalan Parliament, in the Cortes Generales, and from the Socialist Party, do not support Catalan secession, but instead favor changing the constitution to modify the current taxation system and to create a true federal system in Spain, to "better reflect the singularities" of Catalonia.

In December 2012, an opposing rally was organised by the Partido Popular and Ciutadans, which drew 30,000-160,000 people in one of Barcelona's main squares under a large flag of Spain and Catalonia.

== See also ==
- Andalusian nationalism
- Basque nationalism
- Castilian nationalism
- Asturian nationalism
- Leonese nationalism
- Pancatalanism
- Valencian nationalism
- Aragonese nationalism
- Canarian nationalism
- Catalan nationalism
- Galician nationalism
- National and regional identity in Spain
- Politics of Spain: The nationality debate
- Political divisions of Spain
- Portugal–Spain relations
- Nation state
