= Gabriel Urralburu =

Spanish politician

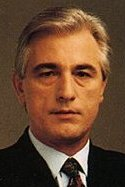

4th President of the Government of Navarre
- In office 15 May 1984 – 3 September 1991
- Preceded by: Juan Manuel Arza
- Succeeded by: Juan Cruz Alli

Secretary-General of the PSN-PSOE
- In office 15 June 1982 – 20 June 1994
- Preceded by: None
- Succeeded by: Javier Otano

Personal details
- Born: Gabriel Urralburu Tainta; 6 November 1950 (age 75) Ezcároz, Navarre, Spain
- Party: Socialist Party of Navarre

Gabriel Urralburu Tainta (born 6 November 1950) is a Spanish politician who was President of Navarre between 1984 and 1991.

== Early life and education ==
Born in 1950 in the town of Ezkároz in the province of Navarre, he earned a baccalaureate in La Estella. Later he moved to Pamplona, where he studied philosophy, letters, and theology at the Higher Center for Theological Studies in Pamplona. He received a degree in Theological and Moral Sciences.

== Career ==
In 1973, with the encouragement of politicians Enrique Múgica and G. Peces-Barba, he took part in the formation of the Spanish Socialist Workers’ Party (PSOE). A year later, he took part in the founding of the Socialist Federation of Navarre. In 1975 he was elected Secretary of Political Relations of the Socialist Association of the Province of Navarre and a member of the Federal Committee of the PSOE.

In 1976 he was ordained a priest of the Order of Missionaries of the Divine Word. In the same year he participated in the writing of the manifesto of the Democratic Convergence (Coordinacion Democratica, or Platajunta), which coordinated the opposition to the dictatorial regime after the death of Francisco Franco. One of his first public act was to represent Navarre at the Assembly of Basque Parliamentarians held in Gernika on June 16, 1977.

He was elected to the Congress of Deputies in 1977 and re-elected in 1979. Also in 1979, he was elected a parliamentary representative for the city of Pamplona, a post to which he was re-elected in 1983, 1987, and 1991, and served as spokesman for the Socialist Parliamentary Group and as secretary of the Basque Parliamentary Council. During his second term in the Congress of Deputies he was on the Agriculture, Economy, and Finance commissions.

He left the Congress of Deputies in 1982 to join the Navarre Parliament. Also in 1982, he sat on the commission that re-negotiated the Pact of Reintegration and Improvement of the Regional Regime with the Spanish government. In the same year, he was elected Secretary General of the Socialist Party of Navarre (PSN).

In 1984, he was named President of Navarre because he was the head of the party with the largest number of seats in the regional parliament, and took office on May 5 of that year. He was re-elected to the Navarre Parliament in 1985 and was re-appointed President of Navarre in 1987. During his second term, he opposed the incorporation of Navarre into the Basque Autonomous Community. He served as president until 1991, when the Navarrese People's Union (UPN), under Juan Cruz Alli, came to power.

In 1994, he left the position of Secretary General of the PSN when he was accused of accepting bribes in exchange for awarding public works contracts. After leaving politics, he lived in Pamplona and began studying law online. On September 7, 1998, he was sentenced to 11 years in prison, and his wife was sentenced to three years for involvement in his crimes. On appeal, his sentence was reduced to four years, and he began serving it in 2001.

As of 2013, he was practicing law in Madrid. It was reported in May 2017 that his name appeared on a list of 316 people in Navarre who owed over 250,000 euros to the government. In his case, the amount owed was 491,770 euros.

== Personal life ==
His wife is Olivia Balda.
