= Iñaki Aldekoa =

Spanish politician (1940–2021)

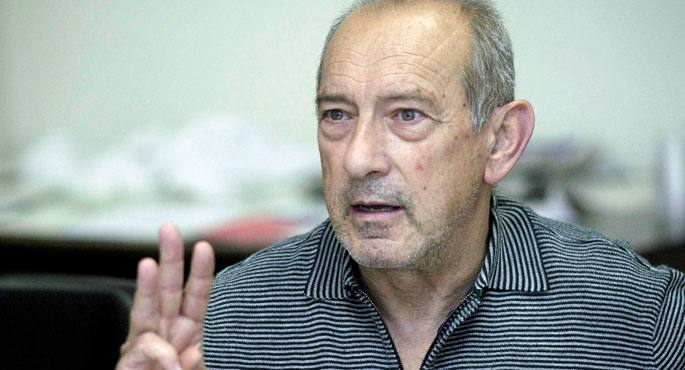
Iñaki Aldekoa

Iñaki Aldekoa Azarloza (1940 – 8 April 2021) was a Spanish abertzale politician who served as a deputy.

Born in Amorebieta-Etxano, he was previously an industrial engineer by profession.
