= Rafael Arias-Salgado =

Spanish politician (born 1942)

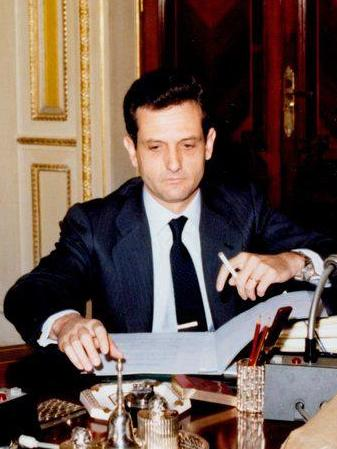
Rafael Arias–Salgado in 1980.

Rafael Arias-Salgado Montalvo (26 January 1942, Madrid) is a Spanish politician.

The son of Gabriel Arias-Salgado, a minister under Franco and brother of Fernando Arias-Salgado: a former head of the Spanish TV company and a diplomat.

He qualified as a lawyer, was a deputy for the UCD for Toledo from 1977–1982, serving as Secretary-General for Relations with the Cortes (1977–1979), Deputy Minister for Relations with the Cortes (1979–1980), Assistant Minister to the Prime Minister (1980), Minister of the Presidency (1980–1981) and Minister of Territorial Administration (1981–1982).

After the disbandment of the UCD he dedicated himself to private business. He was president of the security company Prosegur (1983–1985). In 1987 he joined the UCD splinter party the Democratic and Social Centre (CDS) and represented that party as deputy for Madrid (1990–1992). In 1993 he joined the Partido Popular, serving as Minister of Public Works (1996–2000).

Currently he is President of the Carrefour group in Spain.
