= Communities of chartered regime =

Type of regions in the political division of Spain

The constitution of Spain of 1978 allowed for the nationalities and regions that make up the Spanish nation to accede to self-government and be constituted as autonomous communities, which became the first-order political and territorial division of the Spanish territory. Both the process whereby the nationalities and regions were to accede to self-government and the scope of competences that were to be devolved or transferred from the central government, were intended to be asymmetrical in nature.

One of the main differences was established in the first additional provision of the constitution, after much debate in the Spanish Parliament acting as a Constituent Assembly. This provision established a protection and respect for the historical rights of the territories that had fueros, "charters", "privileges" or "jurisdictions", which were to be "updated" within the framework of the constitution. These territories were Álava, Gipuzkoa, Biscay and Navarre. The first three joined to form the autonomous community of the Basque Country, whereas Navarre was constituted itself as the Chartered Community of Navarre. The charters that were recognized and updated granted them specific powers not recognized in other autonomous communities, most notably, fiscal autonomy which is the power to manage their own revenue and expenditure. As such, these two autonomous communities are known as communities of chartered regime (Spanish: comunidades de régimen foral) or more simply chartered communities whereas the autonomous communities without fiscal autonomy, became known as communities of common regime.

== Background ==
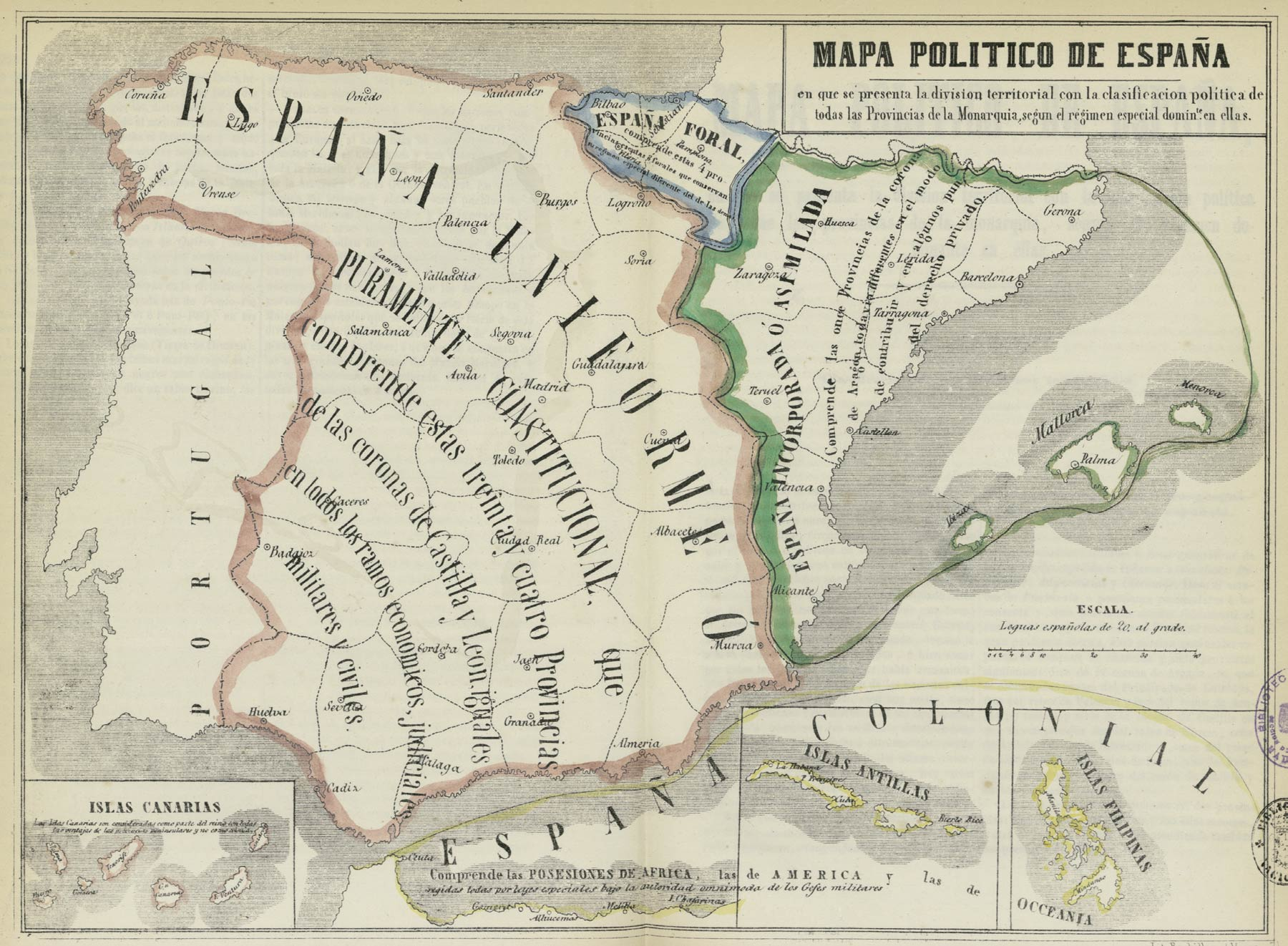
Map of Spain in the 1850s, showing the different territories based on their regimes. The "Chartered Spain" is shown in blue, whereas the "Assimilated Spain" — regions whose charters had already been abolished — is shown in green. The rest of peninsular Spain, in orange, is shown as "Uniform Spain", whereas the overseas Spanish territories, "Colonial Spain", are shown in yellow.

From the 12th to the 16th century, as the Kingdom of Castile expanded to the south or incorporated other kingdoms and territories into the Crown of Castile, which then became the Kingdom of Spain, the monarchy granted them certain privileges and jurisdictions, which were known as fueros, or "charters". The competences of the fueros at one point in time included the right to establish custom controls, have their own militias as well as some governing institutions, and to manage their civic and fiscal affairs, but these were progressively reduced or completely eliminated — as was the case for the former constituent kingdoms of the Crown of Aragon. The case of the Basque territories was unique, in that their fueros were the only to survive well into the 19th century, even if their scope was much reduced, whereas the fueros of other kingdoms and regions had already been abolished by then.

During the 19th century, and in the several constitutions that were written, the monarchy tried to homogenize all regions in Spain, and tried to abolish the fueros of the Basque provinces and Navarre. The constitution of 1837, for example, established that the same codes should govern the entire kingdom, and a single fuero should apply to all Spaniards. Nonetheless, only two years after, by the end of the First Carlist War, the law of 25 October 1839, again recognized the validity of their fueros, even though the government retained the right to modify them if necessary in the nation's interest. So, the law of 16 August 1841 known as Ley Paccionada (negotiated law) introduced changes and suppressed some of the provisions of Navarrese fueros and established the convenio económico (economic covenant) as the system of fiscal autonomy.

In the case of the Basque provinces, at the first stance the Royal Decree of 29 October 1841 greatly reduced the scope of the fueros in the three provinces, eliminating the judicial autonomy of the territories and substituted the Deputations and General Juntas with Provincial Deputations, which were the institutions of government common to all provinces of Spain. Finally, the law of 21 July 1876, during the time known in Spanish history as the Restoration, abolished the fueros of the Basque provinces while, paradoxically, keeping the fiscal autonomy of the territories in the form of a concierto económico, "economic treaty". This system was abolished in Gipuzkoa and Biscay during the Spanish Civil War, through the decree-law of 23 July 1937, as a "punishment" for taking up arms against the National Movement, the insurrection that led to the dictatorial regime of Francisco Franco. At the end of Franco's regime, new laws derogated that decree-law.

During Spanish transition to democracy, the recognition of these fueros was one of the hardest to reach a consensus on, and incited many heated debates, but in the end the Constituent Assembly opted to recognize them within the framework of the constitution and the Statutes of Autonomy — the basic organic laws of the autonomous communities that were to be created — and therefore they were to be "updated" or "modernized".

== Fiscal autonomy in the communities of chartered regime ==
The provinces of Álava, Gipuzkoa and Biscay, in exercise of the right to self-government of all "nationalities and regions" granted in the constitution, joined to form the autonomous community of the Basque Country, and recognized itself as one of the "nationalities of Spain". These three territories had historically been known as the "Basque provinces" (Spanish: provincias vascongandas). The Statute of Autonomy of the Basque Country, establishes that the community could incorporate Navarre, if its population so desired. The Statute of Autonomy of the Basque Country, in exercising the right recognized in the First Additional Disposition, created its own autonomous treasury and established its fiscal autonomy. In practice, what this means, is that the historical territories of the Basque Country have the faculty to maintain, establish and regulate their tax systems, including the ability to collect, manage and inspect all State taxes — that is all the taxes established by the central government — with the exception of import duties and the value added tax. The autonomous community then transfers to the central government a specific amount of money, for the management of those competences that the community did not assume, but that are within the central government's scope of action. This amount is known as cupo, "quota", or aportación, "contribution", and the treaty whereby this system is recognized is known as concierto, "treaty", or convenio, "pact".

Navarre, on the other hand, chose not to form part of the autonomous community of the Basque Country and, unlike the other communities, it acceded to self-government by taking as a starting point the recognition of their fueros, based on the Ley Paccionada, "Negotiated Law", of 1841, which had been declared valid. In lieu of a Statute of Autonomy per se, the Parliament of Navarre passed a Law of Reintegration and Improvement of Navarre's Chartered Regime, even if in practice this Law is recognized as the equivalent of a Statute of Autonomy. This Law for Navarre also created its own treasury and established its fiscal autonomy, and, as in the case of the Basque Country, Navarre collects all taxes and then sends a "quota" or "contribution" to the central government. The main difference between the Basque Country and Navarre, is that in the Basque Country it is the historical territories (Araba, Gipuzkoa and Biscay) that have their own "chartered" system, and as such they are recognized as "chartered deputations" (Spanish: diputaciones forales, Basque: foru aldundi) which then jointly conform the autonomous community of the Basque Country, whereas Navarre, being a province and an autonomous community in itself, is recognized as a "chartered community" (Spanish: comunidad foral, Basque: foru erkidego) as opposed to an "autonomous community".

== Chartered communities within the State of Autonomies ==
The territorial administration in Spain in which 17 autonomous communities were created is known as the "State of the Autonomies". The 15 communities which are not part of the chartered regime belong to what is known as a "common regime", in which the central government is in charge of collecting taxes from all communities and then redistributing them for purposes of a so-called "fiscal-equalization". In practice, richer common-regime communities become net contributors, while poorer communities are net recipients of redistributed money from the central government. Since the two chartered communities collect all taxes themselves and only send a quota for those competences that still belong to the central government, they do not receive anything back.

In Catalonia, one of the largest net contributors to the "common-regime" system, nationalist parties feel that the system is unbalanced, and have voiced its concern that their "net contribution" is disproportionally larger when compared to what occurs in redistribution or contribution systems in other countries in Europe (only the Community of Madrid is a larger net contributor to the system, with almost twice the contribution deficit of Catalonia). Though not part of the common-regime system, for comparative purposes, when taking into account the "quota" transferred to the central government, the Basque Country and Navarre would be among the smallest contributors, despite being among the richest communities in income per capita.

Catalan nationalist politicians have demanded either a change in the "common-regime" system or full fiscal autonomy for Catalonia like that enjoyed by the communities of chartered regime. This demand is largely supported by the Catalan population.

== See also ==
- Nueva Planta decrees, which abolished the fueros of the territories of the Crown of Aragon
