= Jaime Ignacio del Burgo =

Navarrese lawyer, deputy and historian (born 1942)

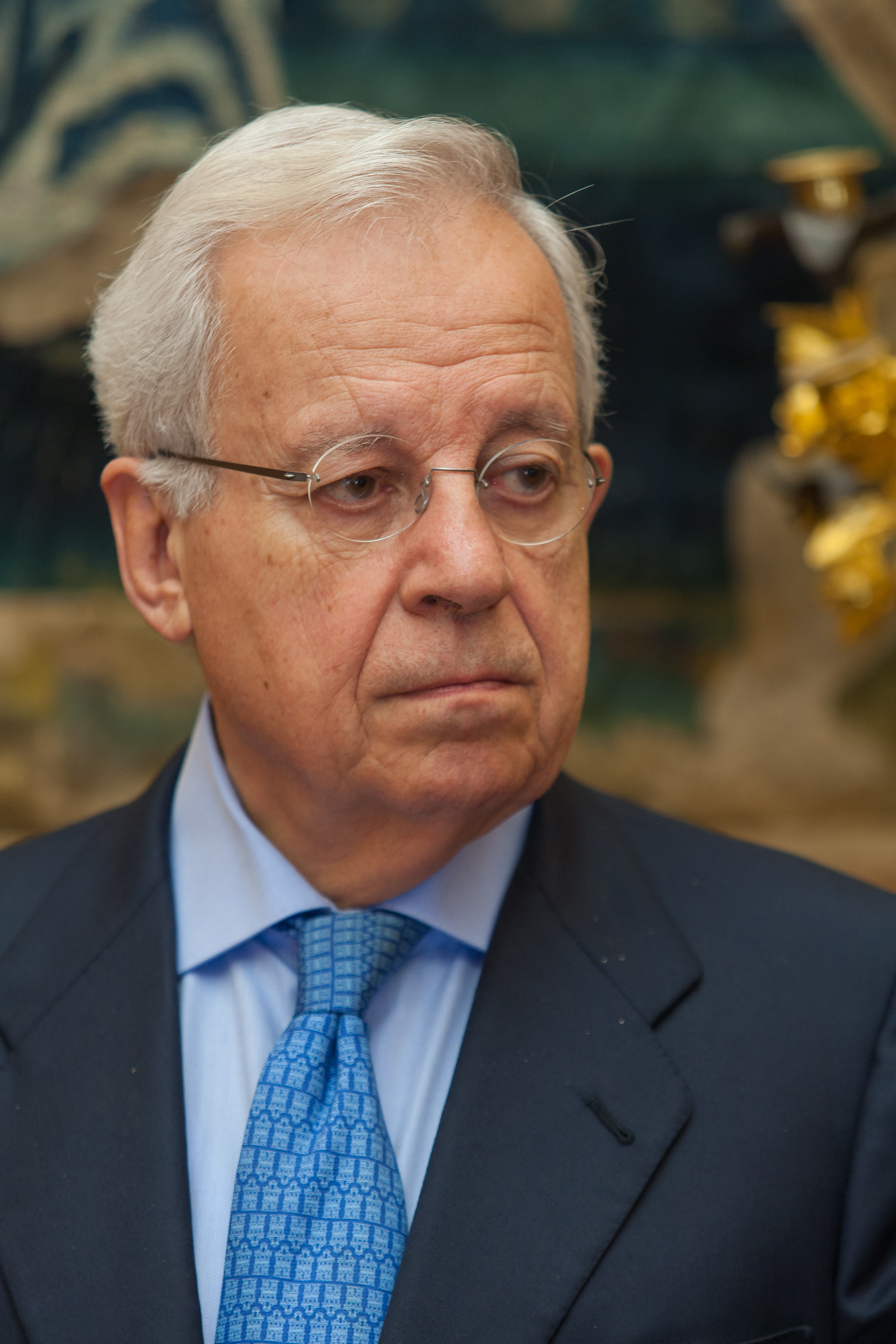
Jaime Ignacio del Burgo Tajadura

Jaime Ignacio del Burgo Tajadura (Pamplona, Spain 1942) Doctor in Law from the University of Deusto (Bilbao, Spain), he is a jurist, historian and politician from Navarra, which is a Foral or autonomous Community, integrated into the Kingdom of Spain. In 1977 he was elected Senator (1977–1982 and 1986–1989) and had an active participation in the drafting of the Spanish Constitution of 1978. In 1979 he was elected member of the Parliament of Navarra, provincial deputy for the city of Pamplona and president of the first Provincial Council or Government of Navarra. In 1989 he was elected Deputy of Navarra in the Spanish Congress of Deputies, a position he held until 2008. He was president of the Constitutional Commission of Congress (2002–2004).

Throughout his political life he defended the freedom of Navarra and the right of the Navarrese people not to be integrated into the Autonomous Community of the Basque Country [Euskadi or Euskalherria]. Likewise, he is considered the “intellectual author” of the Improvement of the regional [or autonomous] regime of Navarra, which reflects the historical rights of Navarra, protected and respected by the Constitution.

He is a corresponding Academician of the Royal Academy of History, of the Royal Academy of Moral and Political Sciences and of the Royal Academy of Jurisprudence and Legislation. He was a professor of Public Foral Law at the Faculty of Law of the University of Navarra. He is a member of the Order of Constitutional Merit and the Cross of Honor of the Order of the Cross of San Raimundo de Peñafort.

He is the author of 44 books, including “Origin and foundation of the Foral Regime in Navarra” (Pamplona, 1968), “Foral Law Course of Navarra”. (Pamplona, 1996.), “Navarra is freedom” (2 volumes, Madrid, 1999); “Cánovas and the Economic Agreements. Death and resurrection of the Basque Fueros” (Pamplona, 2010); “History of Navarre”. Joint work with Jaime del Burgo. (Pamplona, 2013), “11-M, the attack that changed the history of Spain” (Madrid, 2014), “The epic of the Basque and Navarrese forality. Beginning and end of the regional question, 1808‐1979-1082” (Bilbao, 2016), “Navarra in history”, Madrid, 2017), “Charles V, emperor of the West and peacemaker of Navarre”, (Madrid, 2022); “Assault on democracy” (Madrid, 2022) and “The Improvement of the Jurisdiction. The house of the Navarrese people” (Bilbao, 2023).

Son of Jaime del Burgo Torres, a Carlist politician. He is married, with six children.
