= Herri Batasuna =

1978–2001 Basque nationalist coalition in Spain

Popular Unity Herri Batasuna
- Founded: 27 April 1978 (as electoral coalition); 5 June 1986 (as political party)
- Dissolved: 23 May 2001
- Merger of: Euskal Sozialista Biltzarrea; Langile Abertzale Iraultzaileen Alderdia; Herri Alderdi Sozialista Iraultzailea; Eusko Abertzale Ekintza; Abertzale Sozialista Komiteak
- Merged into: Euskal Herritarrok
- Headquarters: C/ Astarloa, nº 8-1º, Bilbao
- Newspaper: Herria Eginez
- Youth wing: Jarrai
- Affiliated union: Langile Abertzaleen Batzordeak
- Ideology: Marxism-Leninism; Basque nationalism Revolutionary socialism Abertzale Left; Left-wing nationalism Basque independence Anti-capitalism
- Political position: Far-left

Party flag

Herri Batasuna (Basque pronunciation: [eˈri baˌtas̺uˈna]; English: Popular Unity; HB) was a far-left Basque nationalist coalition in the (Spanish) Southern Basque Country. It was founded in 1978 and defined itself as abertzale, left-wing, socialist, and supported the independence of the Basque Country. It was refounded as Batasuna in 2001 and subsequently outlawed by the Spanish Supreme Court for being considered the political wing of the separatist group Euskadi Ta Askatasuna (ETA).

== History ==
Herri Batasuna was founded in April 1978 as a coalition of leftist Basque nationalist political groups initially brought together to advocate for "No" in the referendum to be held that year on the Spanish constitution.

Its constituent parties had been called together by senior Basque nationalist Telesforo de Monzón in a 1978 meeting called "The table of Altsasu". Herri Batasuna's founding convention was held in Lekeitio, home of Santiago Brouard, who was then the leader of HASI (Herriko Alderdi Sozialista Iraultzailea or Revolutionary Socialist People's Party). The party won 150,000 votes in the Basque Autonomous Community (15%) and 22,000 additional votes in Navarre (9%) in its first Spanish general election in March 1979. Thus, they won three seats in the Spanish Parliament, which they did not occupy. The same happened in 1980 in the first elections to the Basque Parliament, in which HB stood as a second political force, with 151,636 votes (16.55%), winning 11 seats. Its absence allowed a BNP-only Basque government led by Carlos Garaikoetxea. On 20 November 1984, Brouard was assassinated by two members of the Spanish-state-sponsored death squad GAL.

Another well-known Herri Batasuna leader, Josu Muguruza, was also killed by members of the neo-fascist Bases Autónomas in 1989, while he was in a hotel in Madrid. He was a congressman in the Spanish Parliament when he was assassinated.

== Electoral performance ==
Since its foundation, Herri Batasuna ran for every election in the Basque Country and in Navarre, as well as in Spanish general elections (from 1979 to 1996) and the European elections of 1987, 1989 and 1994. In the 2000 Spanish general election, it supported abstention. In the elections held from 1998 to 2001, it was part of the coalition Euskal Herritarrok.

Herri Batasuna refused to participate in many of the institutions where it won seats, with the exception of local town halls.

=== Spanish general elections ===
Year	Votes	%	Deputies	Senate
1979	172,110	0.96	3 / 350	1 / 208
1982	210,601	1.00	2 / 350	0 / 350
1986	231,722	1.15	5 / 350	1 / 208
1989	217,278	1.06	4 / 350	3 / 208
1993	206,876	0.88	2 / 350	0 / 208
1996	181,304	0.72	2 / 350	0 / 208

== Bibliography ==
- Hepburn, Eve (2013), New Challenges for Stateless Nationalist and Regionalist Parties, Routledge, 186, ISBN 978-1-317-96596-1
