= Government of Uxue Barkos =

Former government of Navarre

- Government of Navarre
- 2015–2019
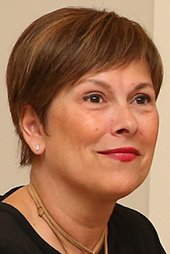
- Uxue Barkos in October 2018.
- Date formed: 23 July 2015
- Date dissolved: 7 August 2019

People and organisations
- Monarch: Felipe VI
- President: Uxue Barkos
- Vice Presidents: Manu Ayerdi ^{(1st)} Miguel Laparra ^{(2nd)}
- No. of ministers: 9 (Note: Does not include the President.)
- Total no. of members: 10
- Member party: GBai; EH Bildu; I–E (n)
- Status in legislature: Minority (coalition)
- Opposition party: UPN
- Opposition leader: Javier Esparza

History
- Election: 2015 regional election
- Outgoing election: 2019 regional election
- Legislature term: 9th Parliament
- Budget: 2016, 2017, 2018, 2019
- Predecessor: Barcina
- Successor: Chivite I

The government of Uxue Barkos was formed on 23 July 2015, following the latter's election as president of the Government of Navarre by the Parliament of Navarre on 20 July and her swearing-in on 22 July, as a result of Geroa Bai (GBai) being able to muster a majority of seats in the Parliament together with EH Bildu and Izquierda-Ezkerra (I–E), with external support from Podemos, following the 2015 Navarrese regional election. It succeeded the Barcina government and was the Government of Navarre from 23 July 2015 to 7 August 2019, a total of 1,476 days, or 4 years and 15 days.

The cabinet comprised members of GBai—with the involvement of Zabaltzen (ZBN) and the Basque Nationalist Party (EAJ/PNV)—EH Bildu and I–E (represented in the cabinet by United Left of Navarre, IUN/NEB), as well as a number of independents proposed by the first two parties. It was automatically dismissed on 27 May 2019 as a consequence of the 2019 regional election, but remained in acting capacity until the next government was sworn in.

== Investiture ==
Investiture; Uxue Barkos (GBai)
Ballot →	20 July 2015
Required majority →	26 out of 50
Yes: • GBai (9); • EH Bildu (8); • Podemos (7); • I–E (n) (2)	26 / 50
No: • UPN (15); • PP (2)	17 / 50
Abstentions: • PSN (7)	7 / 50
Absentees	0 / 50

== Cabinet changes ==
Barkos's government saw a number of cabinet changes during its tenure:

- On 7 September 2016, it was announced tha the functions of the Spokesperson of the Government would be detached from the Citizen and Institutional Relations ministry, appointing María Solana to the post with the rank of director-general.
- On 11 April 2017, José Luis Mendoza announced his resignation as Minister of Education, with the post being assumed by the Spokesperson, María Solana.

== Council of Government ==
The Council of Government was structured into the offices for the president, the two vice presidents and nine ministries.

← Barkos Government → (23 July 2015 – 7 August 2019)
Portfolio	Name	Party	Took office	Left office	Ref.
President	Uxue Barkos	Independent	22 July 2015	6 August 2019	
First Vice President; Minister of Economic Development	Manu Ayerdi	GBai (PNV)	23 July 2015	7 August 2019	
Second Vice President; Minister of Social Rights	Miguel Laparra	I–E (n) (IUN)	23 July 2015	7 August 2019	
Minister of Finance and Financial Policy	Mikel Aranburu	Independent	23 July 2015	7 August 2019	
Minister of the Presidency, Civil Service, Interior and Justice	María José Beaumont	Independent	23 July 2015	7 August 2019	
Minister of Citizen and Institutional Relations; Spokesperson of the Government	Ana Ollo	Independent	23 July 2015	8 September 2016	
Minister of Education	José Luis Mendoza	Independent	23 July 2015	12 April 2017	
Minister of Health	Fernando Domínguez	Independent	23 July 2015	7 August 2019	
Minister of Culture, Sports and Youth	Ana Herrera	Independent	23 July 2015	7 August 2019	
Minister of Rural Development, Local Administration and Environment	Isabel Elizalde	Independent	23 July 2015	7 August 2019	
=== Changes September 2016 ===
Portfolio	Name	Party	Took office	Left office	Ref.
Minister of Citizen and Institutional Relations	Ana Ollo	Independent	8 September 2016	7 August 2019	
Spokesperson of the Government	María Solana	GBai (PNV)	8 September 2016	12 April 2017	
=== Changes April 2017 ===
Portfolio	Name	Party	Took office	Left office	Ref.
Minister of Education; Spokesperson of the Government	María Solana	GBai (PNV)	12 April 2017	7 August 2019	

== Departmental structure ==
Uxue Barkos's government was organised into several superior and governing units, whose number, powers and hierarchical structure varied depending on the ministerial department.

Unit/body rank

- (■) Director-general
- (■) Service

Office (Original name)	Portrait	Name	Took office	Left office	Alliance/party	Ref.
=== Presidency ===
Presidency (Presidencia del Gobierno)		Uxue Barkos	22 July 2015	6 August 2019	GBai (Indep., ZBN nominated)	
First Vice Presidency (Vicepresidencia Primera del Gobierno)		Manu Ayerdi	23 July 2015	7 August 2019	GBai (EAJ/PNV)	
First Vice Presidency (Vicepresidencia Primera del Gobierno)	See Department of Economic Development					
Second Vice Presidency (Vicepresidencia Segunda del Gobierno)		Miguel Laparra	23 July 2015	7 August 2019	I–E (n) (IUN/NEB)	
Second Vice Presidency (Vicepresidencia Segunda del Gobierno)	See Department of Social Rights					
=== Department of Economic Development ===
Department of Economic; Development (Departamento de Desarrollo; Económico)		Manu Ayerdi	23 July 2015	7 August 2019	GBai (EAJ/PNV)	
Department of Economic; Development (Departamento de Desarrollo; Económico)	13 August 2015 – 15 August 2019: (■) Directorate-General for Economic and Business Policy and Labour; (■) Service for Economic Policy; (■) Service for International Projection; (■) Service for Business Promotion; (■) Service for Reindustrialization, Competitiveness and Strategic Projects (disest. 31 Jan 2017); (■) Service for Labour; (■) Directorate-General for Industry, Energy and Innovation; (■) Service for Innovation and Knowledge Transfer (until 31 Jan 2017) / Service for RDI (from 31 Jan 2017); (■) Service for Energy, Mines and Industrial Safety; (■) Service for Legal and Administrative Assistance; (■) Directorate-General for Tourism and Trade; (■) Service for Tourism Marketing and Product Development (until 31 Jan 2017) / Service for Tourism Marketing (from 31 Jan 2017); (■) Service for Tourism and Trade Management and Promotion; (■) Service for Consumer Affairs and Arbitration; (■) Directorate-General for Public Works; (■) Service for Studies and Projects; (■) Service for Construction; (■) Service for Conservation; (■) Service for Transport; (■) Service for Budget Economic Management and Expenditure Control					
=== Department of Social Rights ===
Department of Social Rights (Departamento de Derechos Sociales)		Miguel Laparra	23 July 2015	7 August 2019	I–E (n) (IUN/NEB)	
Department of Social Rights (Departamento de Derechos Sociales)	13 August 2015 – 15 August 2019: (■) Directorate-General for Inclusion and Social Protection; (■) Service for Primary Care and Social Inclusion; (■) Service for Income Guarantee and Cooperation; (■) Service for Housing; (■) Directorate-General for the Observatory of Social Reality and Social Policy Planning and Evaluation; (■) Service for the Observatory of Social Reality; (■) Service for Quality and Inspection; (■) Technical General Secretariat of Social Rights					
=== Department of Finance and Financial Policy ===
Department of Finance and Financial Policy (Departamento de Hacienda y Política Financiera)		Mikel Aranburu	23 July 2015	7 August 2019	GBai (Indep., ZBN nominated)	
Department of Finance and Financial Policy (Departamento de Hacienda y Política Financiera)	13 August 2015 – 15 August 2019: (■) Directorate-General for Budgets; (■) Service for Budgets and Financial Policy; (■) Service for Accounting; (■) Service for Comptrolling; (■) Service for Heritage; (■) Technical General Secretariat of Finance and Financial Policy; (■) Regional Economic-Administrative Court of Navarre					
=== Department of the Presidency, Civil Service, Interior and Justice ===
Department of the Presidency, Civil Service, Interior and Justice (Departamento de Presidencia, Función Pública, Interior y Justicia)		María José Beaumont	23 July 2015	7 August 2019	EH Bildu (Independent)	
Department of the Presidency, Civil Service, Interior and Justice (Departamento de Presidencia, Función Pública, Interior y Justicia)	13 August 2015 – 15 August 2019: (■) Directorate-General for the Presidency and Open Government; (■) Service for Legal Advisory; (■) Service for Government Secretariat and Normative Action; (■) Service for Open Government; (■) Administrative Court of Navarre; (■) Directorate-General for Civil Service; (■) Service for Personnel Expenditure Control and Payroll; (■) Service for Personnel Management; (■) Service for Civil Service Ordinance; (■) Service for Social Benefits; (■) Directorate-General for the Interior; (■) Service for Security Policy Development; (■) Service for Legal Regime and Staff (until 31 Mar 2017) / Service for Legal Regime of the Interior (from 31 Mar 2017); (■) Fire Service (until 27 Nov 2015) / Fire Service of Navarre (from 27 Nov 2015); (■) Service for Civil Protection; (■) Directorate-General for Justice; (■) Service for Human and Material Resource Management; (■) Social Service for Justice; (■) Directorate-General for Informatics and Telecommunications (until 10 Sep 2015) / Directorate-General for Informatics, Telecommunications and Public Innovation (from 10 Sep 2015); (■) Service for Corporate Information Systems; (■) Service for Departmental Information Systems; (■) Service for Technological Infrastructure and Support Center; (■) Service for Health Area Information Systems; (■) Service for Organization and Public Innovation (est. 10 Sep 2015); (■) Technical General Secretariat of the Presidency, Civil Service, Interior and Justice					
=== Department of Citizen and Institutional Relations ===
Department of Citizen and Institutional Relations (Departamento de Relaciones Ciudadanas e Institucionales)		Ana Ollo	23 July 2015	7 August 2019	GBai (Independent)	
=== Department of Education ===
Department of Education (Departamento de Educación)		José Luis Mendoza	23 July 2015	12 April 2017	GBai (Indep., ZBN nominated)	
Department of Education (Departamento de Educación)		María Solana	12 April 2017	7 August 2019	GBai (EAJ/PNV)	
=== Department of Health ===
Department of Health (Departamento de Salud)		Fernando Domínguez	23 July 2015	7 August 2019	GBai (Independent)	
=== Department of Culture, Sports and Youth ===
Department of Culture, Sports and Youth (Departamento de Cultura, Deporte y Juventud)		Ana Herrera	23 July 2015	7 August 2019	GBai (Independent)	
=== Department of Rural Development, Local Administration and Environment ===
Department of Rural Development, Local Administration and Environment (Departamento de Desarrollo Rural, Administración Local y Medio Ambiente)		Isabel Elizalde	23 July 2015	7 August 2019	EH Bildu (Independent)	
=== Spokesperson of the Government ===
Spokesperson of the Government (Portavoz del Gobierno)		Ana Ollo	23 July 2015	8 September 2016	GBai (Independent)	
Spokesperson of the Government (Portavoz del Gobierno)		María Solana	8 September 2016	7 August 2019	GBai (EAJ/PNV)	

== Notes ==
Preceded by Barcina	Government of Navarre; 2015–2019	Succeeded by Chivite I
