= Government of Yolanda Barcina =

- Government of Navarre
- 2011–2015
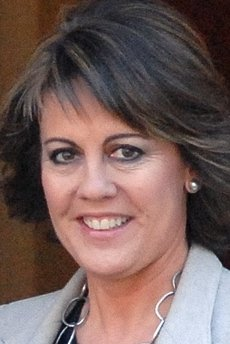
- Yolanda Barcina in February 2012.
- Date formed: 2 July 2011
- Date dissolved: 23 July 2015

People and organisations
- Monarch: Juan Carlos I (2011–2014); Felipe VI (2014–2015)
- President: Yolanda Barcina
- Vice Presidents: Lourdes Goicoechea ^{(1st)} (2012–2015); Juan Luis Sánchez de Muniáin ^{(2nd)} (2012–2015); Roberto Jiménez ^{(1st)} (2011–2012); Álvaro Miranda ^{(2nd)} (2011–2012)
- No. of ministers: 8 (Note: Does not include the President.)
- Total no. of members: 13
- Member party: UPN; PSN–PSOE (2011–2012)
- Status in legislature: Majority (coalition) (2011–2012); Minority (single-party) (2012–2015)
- Opposition party: NaBai 2011 (2011–2012); PSN–PSOE (2012–2015)
- Opposition leader: Patxi Zabaleta (2011–2012); Roberto Jiménez (2012–2015); Santos Cerdán (2015)

History
- Election: 2011 regional election
- Outgoing election: 2015 regional election
- Legislature term: 8th Parliament
- Budget: 2012
- Predecessor: Sanz IV
- Successor: Barkos

The government of Yolanda Barcina was formed on 2 July 2011, following the latter's election as president of the Government of Navarre by the Parliament of Navarre on 23 June and her swearing-in on 1 July, as a result of Navarrese People's Union (UPN) emerging as the largest parliamentary force at the 2011 Navarrese regional election and forming an alliance together with the Socialist Party of Navarre (PSN–PSOE), with which it held a majority in the Parliament. It succeeded the fourth Sanz government and was the Government of Navarre from 2 July 2011 to 23 July 2015, a total of 1,482 days, or 4 years and 21 days.

Until 2012, the cabinet comprised five members of UPN (including one independent) and three of the PSN–PSOE, to become the first coalition government between the two parties in the region. On 15 June 2012, following a dispute between the two parties on economic and budgetary affairs, President Barcina expelled PSN leader and vice president Roberto Jiménez from her cabinet, which led to the two remaining PSN members leaving the government. From that point onwards, UPN would form a minority cabinet until the end of Barcina's term. It was automatically dismissed on 25 May 2015 as a consequence of the 2015 regional election, but remained in acting capacity until the next government was sworn in.

== Investiture ==
Investiture; Yolanda Barcina (UPN)
Ballot →	23 June 2011
Required majority →	26 out of 50
Yes: • UPN (19); • PSN (9)	28 / 50
No: • NaBai (8); • Bildu (7); • PP (4); • I–E (n) (3)	22 / 50
Abstentions	0 / 50
Absentees	0 / 50

== Cabinet changes ==
Barcina's government saw a number of cabinet changes during its tenure:

- On 15 June 2012, Barcina dismissed PSN secretary-general, Roberto Jiménez, as first vice president of her government, accusing him of "disloyalty" following various public statements by Jiménez questioning the situation of Navarra's accounts and suggesting that the public deficit was far superior than the recognized 132 million euros. As a result of the dismissal the other two PSN ministers, Elena Torres (Social Policy, Equality, Sports and Youth) and Anai Astiz (Development and Housing) announced their resignations, de facto terminating the government coalition between the two parties. The functions of the vacant portfolios were assumed by other government ministers until new replacements could be appointed. On 23 June, a major cabinet reshuffle took place, with Lourdes Goicoechea becoming new vice president and regional minister for Economy, Finance, Industry and Employment, replacing Álvaro Miranda; Juan Luis Sánchez de Muniáin assuming the functions of second vice president; Javier Morrás filling the post of Presidency, Justice and Interior minister; Javier Esparza replacing Goicoechea in the rebranded Rural Development, Environment and Local Administration department; Jesús Pejenaute being appointed as new Social Policies minister; and Luis Zarraluqui being appointed to lead the Development portfolio.
- On 21 October 2012, the Social Policies minister, Jesús Pejenaute, resigned from his post after being accused of money laundering, in order to "prevent any false accusations and insults against his person from harming President Barcina and the UPN government". He was replaced in his post by Iñigo Alli on 24 October.

== Council of Government ==
The Council of Government was structured into the offices for the president, the two vice presidents and eight ministries.

← Barcina Government → (2 July 2011 – 23 July 2015)
Portfolio	Name	Party	Took office	Left office	Ref.
President	Yolanda Barcina	UPN	28 June 2011	22 July 2015	
First Vice President; Minister of the Presidency, Public Administrations and Interior	Roberto Jiménez	PSN–PSOE	2 July 2011	16 June 2012	
Second Vice President; Minister of Economy and Finance	Álvaro Miranda	UPN	2 July 2011	23 June 2012	
Minister of Culture, Tourism and Institutional Relations; Spokesperson of the Government	Juan Luis Sánchez de Muniáin	UPN	2 July 2011	23 June 2012	
Minister of Education	José Iribas	UPN	2 July 2011	23 July 2015	
Minister of Health	Marta Vera	Independent	2 July 2011	23 July 2015	
Minister of Social Policy, Equality, Sports and Youth	Elena Torres	PSN–PSOE	2 July 2011	16 June 2012	
Minister of Rural Development, Industry, Employment and Environment	Lourdes Goicoechea	UPN	2 July 2011	23 June 2012	
Minister of Development and Housing	Anai Astiz	PSN–PSOE	2 July 2011	16 June 2012	
=== Changes 16 June 2012 ===
Portfolio	Name	Party	Took office	Left office	Ref.
First Vice President	Vacant from 16 to 23 June 2012.				
Minister of the Presidency, Public Administrations and Interior	Juan Luis Sánchez de Muniáin was temporarily entrusted with the office's portfolio from 16 to 23 June 2012.				
Minister of Social Policy, Equality, Sports and Youth	Marta Vera was temporarily entrusted with the office's portfolio from 16 to 23 June 2012.				
Minister of Development and Housing	Álvaro Miranda was temporarily entrusted with the office's portfolio from 16 to 23 June 2012.				
=== Changes 23 June 2012 ===
Portfolio	Name	Party	Took office	Left office	Ref.
First Vice President; Minister of Economy, Finance, Industry and Employment	Lourdes Goicoechea	UPN	23 June 2012	23 July 2015	
Second Vice President; Minister of Culture, Tourism and Institutional Relations; Spokesperson of the Government	Juan Luis Sánchez de Muniáin	UPN	23 June 2012	23 July 2015	
Minister of the Presidency, Justice and Interior	Javier Morrás	UPN	23 June 2012	23 July 2015	
Minister of Rural Development, Environment and Local Administration	Javier Esparza	UPN	23 June 2012	23 July 2015	
Minister of Social Policies	Jesús Pejenaute	UPN	23 June 2012	21 October 2012	
Minister of Development	Luis Zarraluqui	Independent	23 June 2012	23 July 2015	
=== Changes October 2012 ===
Portfolio	Name	Party	Took office	Left office	Ref.
Minister of Social Policies	Iñigo Alli	UPN	24 October 2012	23 July 2015	

== Departmental structure ==
Yolanda Barcina's government was organised into several superior and governing units, whose number, powers and hierarchical structure varied depending on the ministerial department.

Office (Original name)	Portrait	Name	Took office	Left office	Alliance/party	Ref.
=== Presidency ===
Presidency (Presidencia del Gobierno)		Yolanda Barcina	28 June 2011	22 July 2015	UPN	
First Vice Presidency (Vicepresidencia Primera del Gobierno)		Roberto Jiménez	2 July 2011	16 June 2012	PSN–PSOE	
First Vice Presidency (Vicepresidencia Primera del Gobierno)		Lourdes Goicoechea	23 June 2012	23 July 2015	UPN	
First Vice Presidency (Vicepresidencia Primera del Gobierno)	See Department of the Presidency, Public Administrations and Interior (2 July 2011 – 16 June 2012); See Department of Economy, Finance, Industry and Employment (23 June 2012 – 23 July 2015)					
Second Vice Presidency (Vicepresidencia Segunda del Gobierno)		Álvaro Miranda	2 July 2011	23 June 2012	UPN	
Second Vice Presidency (Vicepresidencia Segunda del Gobierno)		Juan Luis Sánchez de Muniáin	23 June 2012	23 July 2015	UPN	
Second Vice Presidency (Vicepresidencia Segunda del Gobierno)	See Department of Economy and Finance (2 July 2011 – 23 June 2012); See Department of Culture, Tourism and Institutional Relations (23 June 2012 – 23 July 2015)					
=== Department of the Presidency and Interior ===
Department of the Presidency, Public Administrations and Interior (Departamento de Presidencia, Administraciones Públicas e Interior) (until 23 June 2012) Department of the Presidency, Justice and Interior (Departamento de Presidencia, Justicia e Interior) (from 23 June 2012)		Roberto Jiménez	2 July 2011	16 June 2012	PSN–PSOE	
Department of the Presidency, Public Administrations and Interior (Departamento de Presidencia, Administraciones Públicas e Interior) (until 23 June 2012) Department of the Presidency, Justice and Interior (Departamento de Presidencia, Justicia e Interior) (from 23 June 2012)		Juan Luis Sánchez de Muniáin (temporary entrustment)	16 June 2012	23 June 2012	UPN	
Department of the Presidency, Public Administrations and Interior (Departamento de Presidencia, Administraciones Públicas e Interior) (until 23 June 2012) Department of the Presidency, Justice and Interior (Departamento de Presidencia, Justicia e Interior) (from 23 June 2012)		Javier Morrás	23 June 2012	23 July 2015	UPN	
=== Department of Economy and Finance ===
Department of Economy and Finance (Departamento de Economía y Hacienda) (until 23 June 2012) Department of Economy, Finance, Industry and Employment (Departamento de Economía, Hacienda, Industria y Empleo) (from 23 June 2012)		Álvaro Miranda	2 July 2011	23 June 2012	UPN	
Department of Economy and Finance (Departamento de Economía y Hacienda) (until 23 June 2012) Department of Economy, Finance, Industry and Employment (Departamento de Economía, Hacienda, Industria y Empleo) (from 23 June 2012)		Lourdes Goicoechea	23 June 2012	23 July 2015	UPN	
=== Department of Culture, Tourism and Institutional Relations ===
Department of Culture, Tourism and Institutional Relations (Departamento de Cultura, Turismo y Relaciones Institucionales)		Juan Luis Sánchez de Muniáin	2 July 2011	23 July 2015	UPN	
=== Department of Education ===
Department of Education (Departamento de Educación)		José Iribas	2 July 2011	23 July 2015	UPN	
=== Department of Health ===
Department of Health (Departamento de Salud)		Marta Vera	2 July 2011	23 July 2015	UPN (Independent)	
=== Department of Social Policies ===
Department of Social Policy, Equality, Sports and Youth (Departamento de Política Social, Igualdad, Deporte y Juventud) (until 23 June 2012) Department of Social Policies (Departamento de Políticas Sociales) (from 23 June 2012)		Elena Torres	2 July 2011	16 June 2012 (resigned)	PSN–PSOE	
Department of Social Policy, Equality, Sports and Youth (Departamento de Política Social, Igualdad, Deporte y Juventud) (until 23 June 2012) Department of Social Policies (Departamento de Políticas Sociales) (from 23 June 2012)		Marta Vera (temporary entrustment)	16 June 2012	23 June 2012	UPN (Independent)	
Department of Social Policy, Equality, Sports and Youth (Departamento de Política Social, Igualdad, Deporte y Juventud) (until 23 June 2012) Department of Social Policies (Departamento de Políticas Sociales) (from 23 June 2012)		Jesús Pejenaute	23 June 2012	21 October 2012 (resigned)	UPN	
Department of Social Policy, Equality, Sports and Youth (Departamento de Política Social, Igualdad, Deporte y Juventud) (until 23 June 2012) Department of Social Policies (Departamento de Políticas Sociales) (from 23 June 2012)		Iñigo Alli	24 October 2012	23 July 2015	UPN	
=== Department of Rural Development and Environment ===
Department of Rural Development, Industry, Employment and Environment (Departamento de Desarrollo Rural, Industria, Empleo y Medio Ambiente) (until 23 June 2012) Department of Rural Development, Environment and Local Administration (Departamento de Desarrollo Rural, Medio; Ambiente y Administración Local) (from 23 June 2012)		Lourdes Goicoechea	2 July 2011	23 June 2012	UPN	
Department of Rural Development, Industry, Employment and Environment (Departamento de Desarrollo Rural, Industria, Empleo y Medio Ambiente) (until 23 June 2012) Department of Rural Development, Environment and Local Administration (Departamento de Desarrollo Rural, Medio; Ambiente y Administración Local) (from 23 June 2012)		Javier Esparza	23 June 2012	23 July 2015	UPN	
=== Department of Development ===
Department of Development and Housing (Departamento de Fomento y Vivienda) (until 23 June 2012) Department of Development (Departamento de Fomento) (from 23 June 2012)		Anai Astiz	2 July 2011	16 June 2012 (resigned)	PSN–PSOE	
Department of Development and Housing (Departamento de Fomento y Vivienda) (until 23 June 2012) Department of Development (Departamento de Fomento) (from 23 June 2012)		Álvaro Miranda (temporary entrustment)	16 June 2012	23 June 2012	UPN	
Department of Development and Housing (Departamento de Fomento y Vivienda) (until 23 June 2012) Department of Development (Departamento de Fomento) (from 23 June 2012)		Luis Zarraluqui	23 June 2012	23 July 2015	UPN (Independent)	
=== Spokesperson of the Government ===
Spokesperson of the Government (Portavoz del Gobierno)		Juan Luis Sánchez de Muniáin	2 July 2011	23 July 2015	UPN	

== Notes ==
Preceded by Sanz IV	Government of Navarre; 2011–2015	Succeeded by Barkos
