= Fourth government of Miguel Sanz =

4th government of Miguel Sanz
- Government of Navarre
- 2007–2011
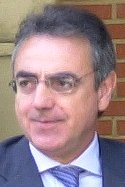
- Miguel Sanz in July 2005.
- Date formed: 17 August 2007
- Date dissolved: 2 July 2011

People and organisations
- Monarch: Juan Carlos I
- President: Miguel Sanz
- Vice Presidents: Javier Caballero ^{(1st)} Álvaro Miranda ^{(2nd)}
- No. of ministers: 12 (Note: Does not include the President.)
- Total no. of members: 12
- Member party: UPN; CDN (2007–2009)
- Status in legislature: Minority (coalition) (2007–2009); Minority (single-party) (2009–2011)
- Opposition party: NaBai
- Opposition leader: Patxi Zabaleta

History
- Election: 2007 regional election
- Outgoing election: 2011 regional election
- Legislature term: 7th Parliament
- Predecessor: Sanz III
- Successor: Barcina

The fourth government of Miguel Sanz was formed on 17 August 2007, following the latter's election as president of the Government of Navarre by the Parliament of Navarre on 11 August and his swearing-in on 16 August, as a result of Navarrese People's Union (UPN) emerging as the largest parliamentary force at the 2007 Navarrese regional election and forming an alliance together with the Convergence of Democrats of Navarre (CDN). It succeeded the third Sanz government and was the Government of Navarre from 17 August 2007 to 2 July 2011, a total of 1,415 days, or 3 years, 10 months and 15 days.

Until 2009, the cabinet comprised members of UPN and CDN, as well as a number of independents proposed by the former party. On 28 September 2009, Sanz expelled the two CDN members from the cabinet—effective from 1 October—over discrepancies between the two parties in relation with a reform of the Basque language law.

== Investiture ==
Investiture; Miguel Sanz (UPN)
Ballot →	10 August 2007 (Note: 1 PSN MP cast an invalid ballot in the 10 August vote; 11 PSN MPs cast blank ballots on 12 August.)	11 August 2007
Required majority →	26 out of 50	Simple
Yes: • UPN (22); • CDN (2)	24 / 50	24 / 50
No: • NaBai (12); • PSN (11) (on 10 Aug); • IUN (2)	25 / 50	14 / 50
Abstentions: • PSN (1) (on 12 Aug)	0 / 50	1 / 50
Absentees	0 / 50	0 / 50

== Cabinet changes ==
Sanz's fourth government saw a number of cabinet changes during its tenure:

- On 28 September 2009, Miguel Sanz announced the dismissal of the two CDN ministers from the government, over discrepancies between the two parties in relation with a reform of the Basque language law. This was effective from 1 October, when Alberto Catalán (Institutional Relations and Spokesperson of the Government) and Amelia Salanueva (Local Administration) assumed the portfolios of Education and of Housing and Territory Planning, respectively.

From 23 May 2011, Sanz's cabinet took on acting duties for the duration of the government formation process resulting from the 2011 regional election. A number of ministers renounced their posts throughout this period, with the ordinary discharge of duties of their ministries being transferred to other cabinet members as a result of Sanz being unable to appoint replacements while in acting role.

- On 11 June 2011, Begoña Sanzberro stepped down from the Rural Development and Environment portfolio in order to assume the post of local councillor in Baztán, due to both offices being incompatible. Javier Caballero, acting First Vice President and Minister of the Presidency, Justice and Interior, was temporarily entrusted with the office's portfolio.
- On 15 June 2011, Alberto Catalán stepped down from all his government posts in order to become new president of the Parliament of Navarre, due to both offices being incompatible. Javier Caballero was temporarily entrusted with the office's portfolio.

== Council of Government ==
The Council of Government was structured into the offices for the president, the two vice presidents and 12 ministries.

← Sanz IV Government → (17 August 2007 – 2 July 2011)
Portfolio	Name	Party	Took office	Left office	Ref.
President	Miguel Sanz	UPN	14 August 2007	28 June 2011	
First Vice President; Minister of the Presidency, Justice and Interior	Javier Caballero	UPN	17 August 2007	2 July 2011	
Second Vice President; Minister of Economy and Finance	Álvaro Miranda	Independent (Note: Joined UPN in November 2008.)	17 August 2007	2 July 2011	
Minister of Institutional Relations and Spokesperson of the Government	Alberto Catalán	UPN	17 August 2007	1 October 2009	
Minister of Local Administration	Amelia Salanueva	UPN	17 August 2007	1 October 2009	
Minister of Education	Carlos Pérez-Nievas	CDN	17 August 2007	1 October 2009	
Minister of Health	María Kutz Peironcely	UPN	17 August 2007	2 July 2011	
Minister of Rural Development and Environment	Begoña Sanzberro	UPN	17 August 2007	11 June 2011	
Minister of Social Affairs, Family, Youth and Sports	Isabel García Malo	UPN	17 August 2007	2 July 2011	
Minister of Culture and Tourism–Prince of Viana Institution	Juan Ramón Corpas	Independent	17 August 2007	2 July 2011	
Minister of Public Works, Transport and Communications	Laura Alba	UPN	17 August 2007	2 July 2011	
Minister of Housing and Territory Planning	José Carlos Esparza	CDN	17 August 2007	1 October 2009	
Minister of Innovation, Business and Employment	José María Roig	UPN	17 August 2007	2 July 2011	
=== Changes October 2009 ===
Portfolio	Name	Party	Took office	Left office	Ref.
Minister of Institutional Relations and Spokesperson of the Government; Minister of Education	Alberto Catalán	UPN	1 October 2009	15 June 2011	
Minister of Local Administration; Minister of Housing and Territory Planning	Amelia Salanueva	UPN	1 October 2009	2 July 2011	
=== Changes June 2011 ===
Portfolio	Name	Party	Took office	Left office	Ref.
Minister of Rural Development and Environment	Javier Caballero was temporarily entrusted with the office's portfolio from 11 June to 2 July 2011.				
Minister of Institutional Relations and Spokesperson of the Government; Minister of Education	Javier Caballero was temporarily entrusted with the offices' portfolios from 15 June to 2 July 2011.				

== Notes ==
Preceded by Sanz III	Government of Navarre; 2007–2011	Succeeded by Barcina
