= Isasi =

Isasi is a Basque language surname. Notable people with the surname include:

- Ada Maria Isasi-Diaz (1943–2012), Cuban-American theologian
- Ana Herrera Isasi (born 1966), Spanish politician
- Ana Laura Portuondo Isasi (born 1996), Canadian judoka
- Andrés Isasi (1890–1940), Spanish composer
- Antonio Isasi-Isasmendi (1927–2017), Spanish film director
- Ernesto de Zulueta e Isasi (1892–1969), Spanish diplomat
- Evaristo Isasi (born 1955), Paraguayan footballer
- Iñaki Isasi (born 1977), Spanish cyclist
- Joel Isasi (born 1967), Cuban sprinter
- Juan Bautista Egusquiza (1845–1902), Paraguayan president, full name Juan Bautista Egusquiza Isasi
- Juan Francisco Arnaldo Isasi (died 1655), Puerto Rican bishop
- María Isasi (born 1975), Spanish actress
- Marta Isasi (born 1966), Chilean politician
- Néstor Isasi (born 1972), Paraguayan footballer
- Ramón Isasi (born 1959), Paraguayan footballer
- Rosario Isasi, Peruvian lawyer
- Santiago Isasi (1936–2017), Spanish footballer
- Ziortza Isasi (born 1995), Spanish cyclist

== See also ==
- Markeskua Palace in Eibar, Spain, also known as Isasi Tower
