= Urtasun =

Urtasun is a surname. Notable people with this surname include:

- Álex Urtasun (born 1984), Spanish basketball player
- Ernest Urtasun (born 1982), Spanish politician
- José Manuel Romero Urtasun (born 1977), Spanish footballer
- Mikel Aranburu Urtasun (born 1955), Navarrese politician
- Pablo Urtasun (born 1980), Spanish road bicycle racer
- Peio Canales Urtasun (born 2005), Spanish footballer
- Raquel Urtasun (born 1976), Spanish scientist
- Txemi Urtasun (born 1984), Spanish basketball player
