= Juan Luis Sánchez de Muniáin =

Spanish politician (born 1966)

Second Vice President of Navarre
- In office 23 June 2012 – 23 July 2015
- President: Yolanda Barcina
- Preceded by: Álvaro Miranda
- Succeeded by: Miguel Laparra

Minister of Culture, Tourism and Institutional Relations of Navarre
- In office 2 July 2011 – 23 July 2015
- President: Yolanda Barcina
- Preceded by: Juan Ramón Corpas
- Succeeded by: Ana Ollo; Ana Herrera

Spokesperson of the Government of Navarre
- In office 2 July 2011 – 23 July 2015
- President: Yolanda Barcina
- Preceded by: Alberto Catalán
- Succeeded by: Ana Ollo

Personal details
- Born: Juan Luis Sánchez de Muniáin Lacasia; 1966 (age 59–60) Pamplona, Spain
- Party: Navarrese People's Union

Juan Luis Sánchez de Muniáin Lacasia (born 1966) is a Navarrese politician, who served as Second Vice President of Navarre from 2012 to 2015 and as regional Minister of Culture, Tourism and Institutional Relations and Government's Spokesperson from 2011 to 2015.
