= Roberto Jiménez =

Roberto Jiménez may refer to:

- Roberto Jiménez Alli (born 1973), Spanish politician
- Roberto Jiménez (footballer, born 1983), Peruvian footballer
- Roberto Jiménez (footballer, born 1986), Spanish footballer
- Roberto Jimenez (grappler) (born 2000), Ecuadorian Brazilian jiu-jitsu athlete
