= 2011 Navarrese regional election =

Election in the Spanish region of Navarre

- 22 May 2011

All 50 seats in the Parliament of Navarre 26 seats needed for a majority
- Opinion polls
- Registered: 485,386 ▲2.9%
- Turnout: 327,281 (67.4%) ▼6.4 pp
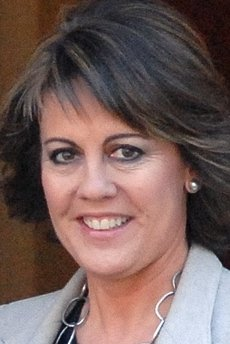

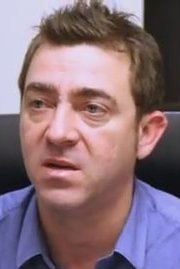

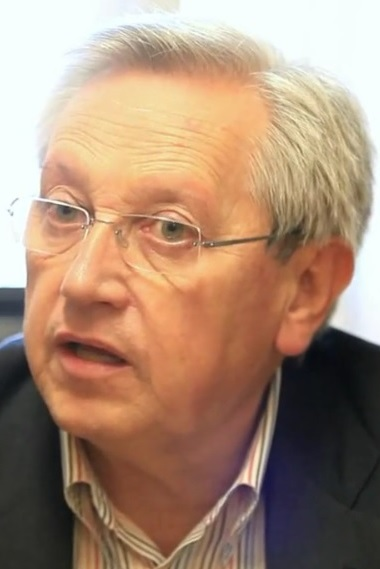

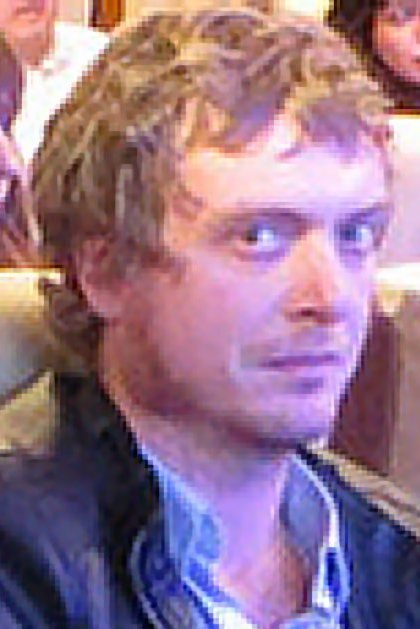

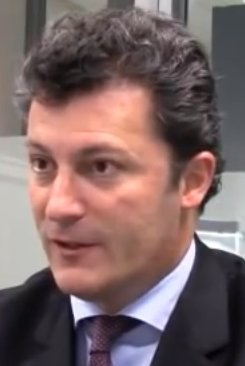

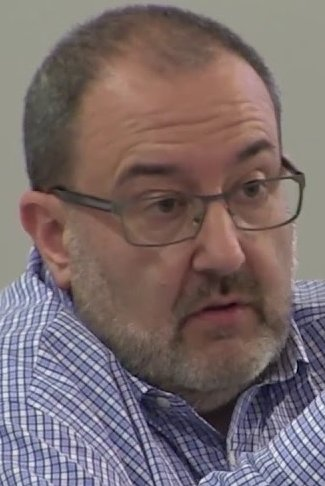
	First party	Second party	Third party
Leader	Yolanda Barcina	Roberto Jiménez	Patxi Zabaleta
Party	UPN	PSN–PSOE	NaBai 2011
Leader since	19 April 2009	28 June 2008	16 September 2006
Last election	22 seats, 42.2%	12 seats, 22.5%	12 seats, 23.6%
Seats won	19	9	8
Seat change	▼3	▼3	▼4
Popular vote	111,474	51,238	49,827
Percentage	34.5%	15.9%	15.4%
Swing	▼7.7 pp	▼6.6 pp	▼8.2 pp
	Fourth party	Fifth party	Sixth party
Leader	Maiorga Ramírez	Santiago Cervera	José Miguel Nuin
Party	Bildu	PP	I–E (n)
Leader since	2011	10 December 2009	29 January 2011
Last election	Did not contest	Did not contest	2 seats, 4.3% (Note: Results for IUN/NEB in the 2007 election.)
Seats won	7	4	3
Seat change	▲7	▲4	▲1
Popular vote	42,916	23,551	18,457
Percentage	13.3%	7.3%	5.7%
Swing	New party	New party	▲1.4 pp
President before election
Miguel Sanz
UPN
President after election
Yolanda Barcina
UPN

A regional election was held in Navarre on 22 May 2011 to elect the 8th Parliament of the chartered community. All 50 seats in the Parliament were up for election. It was held concurrently with regional elections in twelve other autonomous communities and local elections all across Spain.

The election was the first since 1987 to see the People's Party (PP) fielding a separate list to that of the Navarrese People's Union (UPN), with the latter having served as the PP's sister party in Navarre since their 1991 agreement. The breakup of this alliance followed a dispute in October 2008 over a parliamentary vote in the Congress of Deputies, in which UPN chose not to support a PP's amendment to the 2009 budget of José Luis Rodríguez Zapatero's government. Concurrently, incumbent president Miguel Sanz had announced his intention not to run for a fifth term in office, being replaced as UPN leader and candidate by mayor of Pamplona Yolanda Barcina.

The election saw UPN remaining the first political party of Navarre, albeit with a diminished result, scoring 34.5% and 19 seats. The Socialist Party of Navarre (PSN–PSOE) obtained the worst result of its history up until that point, but recovered the second place it had lost in 2007 to Nafarroa Bai (NaBai), which suffered from the abertzale left's legalization by the Constitutional Court of Spain under the Bildu umbrella and an internal split which saw Basque Solidarity (EA) and Assembly (Batzarre) leaving the alliance. Both UPN and the PSN formed a coalition government, electing Barcina as president.

== Overview ==
Under the 1982 Reintegration and Improvement of the Chartered Regime, the Parliament of Navarre was the unicameral legislature of the homonymous chartered community, having legislative power in devolved matters, as well as the ability to grant or withdraw confidence from a regional president. The electoral and procedural rules were supplemented by national law provisions.

=== Date ===
The term of the Parliament of Navarre expired four years after the date of its previous election, unless it was dissolved earlier. If no snap election was called before the last year of the legislative term, the election decree was required to be issued no later than 54 days before the scheduled election date and published on the following day in the Official Gazette of Navarre (BON), with election day taking place on the fourth Sunday of May four years after the previous election. The previous election was held on 27 May 2007, setting the latest possible date for election day on the fourth Sunday of May four years later, which was 22 May 2011.

The regional president had the prerogative to dissolve the Parliament of Navarre at any given time and call a snap election, provided that no motion of no confidence was in process, no nationwide election was due and some time requirements are met: namely, that dissolution did not occur either during the first legislative session or during the last year of parliament before its planned expiration, nor before one year after a previous one under this procedure. In the event of an investiture process failing to elect a regional president within a three-month period from election day, the Parliament was to be automatically dissolved and a fresh election called.

The election to the Parliament of Navarre was officially called on 29 March 2011 with the publication of the corresponding decree in the BON, setting election day for 22 May and scheduling for the chamber to reconvene on 15 June.

=== Electoral system ===
Voting for the Parliament was based on universal suffrage, comprising all Spanish nationals over 18 years of age, registered in Navarre and with full political rights, provided that they had not been deprived of the right to vote by a final sentence, nor were legally incapacitated. Amendments earlier in 2011 required non-resident citizens to apply for voting, a system known as "begged" voting (Spanish: Voto rogado).

The Parliament of Navarre had a minimum of 40 and a maximum of 60 seats, with electoral provisions fixing its size at 50. All were elected in a single multi-member constituency—corresponding to the chartered community's territory—using the D'Hondt method and closed-list proportional voting, with a three percent-threshold of valid votes (including blank ballots) regionally.

The law did not provide for by-elections to fill vacant seats; instead, any vacancies arising after the proclamation of candidates and during the legislative term were filled by the next candidates on the party lists or, when required, by designated substitutes.

=== Outgoing parliament ===
The table below shows the composition of the parliamentary groups in the chamber at the time of the election call.

Parliamentary composition in March 2011
Groups	Parties	Legislators	
Groups	Parties	Seats	Total
Navarrese People's Union Parliamentary Group	UPN	22	22
Navarre Yes Parliamentary Group	Aralar	5	12
Navarre Yes Parliamentary Group	EA	4	12
Navarre Yes Parliamentary Group	EAJ/PNV	1	12
Navarre Yes Parliamentary Group	Batzarre	1	12
Navarre Yes Parliamentary Group	INDEP	1	12
Socialists of the Parliament of Navarre; Parliamentary Group	PSN–PSOE	12	12
Mixed Group	CDN	2	4
Mixed Group	IU	2	4

== Parties and candidates ==
The electoral law allowed for parties and federations registered in the interior ministry, alliances and groupings of electors to present lists of candidates. Parties and federations intending to form a coalition ahead of an election were required to inform the relevant electoral commission within 10 days of the election call, whereas groupings of electors needed to secure the signature of at least one percent of the electorate in Navarre, disallowing electors from signing for more than one list. Additionally, a balanced composition of men and women was required in the electoral lists, so that candidates of either sex made up at least 40 percent of the total composition.

Below is a list of the main parties and alliances which contested the election:

Candidacy	Parties and alliances	Leading candidate	Ideology	Previous result		Gov.	Ref.
Candidacy	Parties and alliances	Leading candidate	Ideology	Vote %	Seats	Gov.	Ref.
UPN	List: Navarrese People's Union (UPN)	Yolanda Barcina	Conservatism; Christian democracy Regionalism	42.2%	22	Yes	
NaBai 2011	List: Aralar (Aralar); Basque Nationalist Party (EAJ/PNV)	Patxi Zabaleta	Basque nationalism Progressivism	23.6%	12	No	
PSN–PSOE	List: Socialist Party of Navarre (PSN–PSOE)	Roberto Jiménez	Social democracy	22.5%	12	No	
CDN	List: Convergence of Democrats of Navarre (CDN)	José Andrés Burguete	Christian democracy Regionalism	4.4%	2	No	
I–E (n)	List: United Left of Navarre (IUN/NEB) – Communist Party of the Basque Country (PCE/EPK) – Revolutionary Workers' Party (POR) – Republican Left (IR); Assembly (Batzarre)	José Miguel Nuin	Socialism; Communism	4.3%	2	No	
PP	List: People's Party (PP)	Santiago Cervera	Conservatism; Christian democracy	Did not contest		No	
Bildu–EA/ AE–EA–A	List: Basque Solidarity (EA); Alternative (Alternatiba); Citizens' Time (HG)	Maiorga Ramírez	Basque independence Abertzale left Socialism	Did not contest		No	

== Opinion polls ==
The tables below list opinion polling results in reverse chronological order, showing the most recent first and using the dates when the survey fieldwork was done, as opposed to the date of publication. Where the fieldwork dates are unknown, the date of publication is given instead. The highest percentage figure in each polling survey is displayed with its background shaded in the leading party's colour. If a tie ensues, this is applied to the figures with the highest percentages. The "Lead" column on the right shows the percentage-point difference between the parties with the highest percentages in a poll.

=== Voting intention estimates ===
The table below lists weighted voting intention estimates. Refusals are generally excluded from the party vote percentages, while question wording and the treatment of "don't know" responses and those not intending to vote may vary between polling organisations. When available, seat projections determined by the polling organisations are displayed below (or in place of) the percentages in a smaller font; 26 seats were required for an absolute majority in the Parliament of Navarre.

Polling firm/Commissioner	Fieldwork date	Sample size	Turnout	UPN	NaBai	PSN–PSOE	CDN	I–E (n)	PP	UPyD	Bildu	Lead
2011 regional election	22 May 2011	—N/a	67.4	34.5; 19	15.4; 8	15.9; 9	1.4; 0	5.7; 3	7.3; 4	0.7; 0	13.3; 7	18.6
Gizaker/Grupo Noticias (Note: "NaBai está a un paso de ser la segunda fuerza más votada en Nafarroa tras UPN". Deia (in Spanish). 14 May 2011. Archived from the original on 25 December 2011.)	14 May 2011	?	79.7	30.6; 16/17	17.0; 9/10	17.9; 9/10	3.0; 0/1	5.2; 2/3	10.0; 5	–	13.2; 6	11.7
Sigma Dos/El Mundo	10–12 May 2011	400	?	35.3; 19/20	19.3; 10	17.8; 9/10	–	4.0; 2	11.4; 6	–	5.4; 3	16.0
NC Report/La Razón (Note: "El PP doblega al PSOE a siete días de la cita electoral". La Razón (in Spanish). 15 May 2011. Archived from the original on 3 September 2011.) (Note: "Vuelco en Cantabria (La Razón)". Electómetro (in Spanish). 15 May 2011. Archived from the original on 19 May 2011.)	3–10 May 2011	?	?	30.2; 18/19	19.7; 10/11	16.9; 8/9	–	? 2/3	17.0; 9/10	–	? 2	10.5
CIES/Diario de Navarra (Note: "UPN lograría 19-20 escaños por 10-11 del PSN y entran PP y Bildu con 4-5 escaños cada uno". Diario de Navarra (in Spanish). 14 May 2011. Archived from the original on 17 May 2011.)	26 Apr–6 May 2011	1,500	68.2	35.8; 19/20	17.3; 9/10	19.3; 10/11	2.4; 0	5.1; 2	8.7; 4/5	0.8; 0	9.2; 4/5	16.5
TNS Demoscopia/Antena 3	5 May 2011	?	?	33.2; 18/19	21.5; 11/12	17.5; 9/10	3.0; 0/1	5.2; 2/3	13.8; 7/8	–	–	11.7
NC Report/La Razón	25 Apr 2011	?	?	31.5; 18/20	? 10	? 9/10	–	–	17.8; 9/10	–	–	?
Celeste-Tel/Terra	13–20 Apr 2011	400	?	33.5; 17	17.6; 10	17.8; 10	–	5.1; 2	9.1; 5	–	11.8; 6	15.7
CIS	17 Mar–17 Apr 2011	790	?	29.0; 16/17	20.7; 11/12	19.3; 11	2.6; 0	7.3; 4	11.3; 6	1.1; 0	3.9; 0/2	8.3
Sigma Dos/El Mundo	12–15 Apr 2011	400	?	32.7; 18	22.0; 12	21.5; 11/12	–	4.3; 2	12.6; 6/7	–	–	10.7
Ikerfel/Vocento	11–13 Apr 2011	1,200	?	25.7; 14	21.1; 11	21.8; 12	–	5.2; 2	13.2; 7	–	7.8; 4	3.9
Gizaker/Grupo Noticias (Note: "UPN es primera fuerza en Nafarroa, pero solo conseguiría la mayoría si cuenta con el apoyo del PSN". Deia (in Spanish). 18 April 2011. Archived from the original on 21 April 2011.) (Note: "El Parlamento de Navarra se fragmenta (Diario de Noticias)". Electómetro (in Spanish). 17 April 2011. Archived from the original on 4 September 2011.) (Note: "Navarra y su Parlamento. Estudio político en Navarra (Abril 2011, Grupo Noticias)" (PDF). Gizaker (in Spanish). 18 April 2011.)	4–6 Apr 2011	?	75	31.6; 17	15.7; 8/9	19.9; 10/11	2.9; 0/1	4.2; 2/3	10.1; 5	–	14.2; 6/7	11.7
Sigma Dos/El Mundo (Note: "Un pacto de UPN con el PP podría darles mayoría absoluta en Navarra (El Mundo)". Electómetro (in Spanish). 7 January 2011. Archived from the original on 27 July 2011.)	23–28 Dec 2010	400	?	32.8; 18	19.6; 10/11	19.4; 10/11	–	3.9; 2	16.4; 9	–	–	13.2
Ikerfel/Parliament of Navarre (Note: "CDN quedaría fuera del Parlamento de Navarra (Navarrometro)". Electómetro (in Spanish). 12 November 2010. Archived from the original on 24 August 2011.)	19–26 Oct 2010	1,500	69.9	34.0; 17/18	24.1; 12/13	23.8; 12/13	1.1; 0	4.0; 2	11.0; 5	0.5; 0	–	9.9
CIES/UPN	19 Oct 2010	?	?	? 18	? 12/14	? 10/11	? 0	? 2	? 4/5	–	? 0/3	?
Sigma Dos/El Mundo	24–26 May 2010	400	?	26.5; 13/14	21.5; 11/12	22.2; 11/12	–	4.0; 2	21.6; 11/12	–	–	4.3
CIES/Parliament of Navarre	19–27 Oct 2009	1,500	64.0	34.4; 18	24.2; 13	23.5; 12	2.4; 0	4.3; 2	9.2; 5	1.1; 0	–	10.2
UPN	30 Sep 2009	?	?	? 16/17	? 14	? 12	? 0	? 1/2	? 6/7	–	–	?
2009 EP election	7 Jun 2009	—N/a	42.7	–	8.8 (5)	31.5 (17)	–	3.3 (1)	37.8 (21)	2.1 (0)	11.4 (6)	6.3
CIES/Diario de Navarra	13–19 Nov 2008	900	68	32.8; 17	24.2; 12	24.9; 13	3.1; 1	4.6; 2	9.5; 5	–	–	7.9
2008 general election	9 Mar 2008	—N/a	72.1	39.2 (21)	18.4 (10)	34.8 (18)	–	3.3 (1)	(Note: Within UPN.)	0.8 (0)	–	4.4
2007 regional election	27 May 2007	—N/a	73.8	42.2; 22	23.6; 12	22.5; 12	4.4; 2	4.3; 2		–	–	18.6

=== Voting preferences ===
The table below lists raw, unweighted voting preferences.

Polling firm/Commissioner	Fieldwork date	Sample size	UPN	NaBai	PSN–PSOE	CDN	I–E (n)	PP	UPyD	Bildu	Question	X mark	Lead
2011 regional election (Note: Does not include non-resident citizens.)	22 May 2011	—N/a	23.8	10.6	10.9	1.0	3.9	5.0	0.5	9.1	—N/a	30.3	12.9
Gizaker/Grupo Noticias	14 May 2011	?	19.9	13.1	11.5	–	–	5.0	–	10.2	–	–	6.8
CIS	17 Mar–17 Apr 2011	790	14.1	8.9	9.9	0.4	3.0	3.8	0.5	2.7	36.3	15.2	4.2
Ikerfel/Parliament of Navarre	19–26 Oct 2010	1,500	16.7	13.7	13.4	0.9	2.7	5.3	0.3	–	27.1	12.7	3.0
CIES/Parliament of Navarre	19–27 Oct 2009	1,500	18.8	14.1	14.2	1.0	2.8	4.5	0.3	–	23.9	15.3	4.6
2009 EP election	7 Jun 2009	—N/a	–	3.8	13.5	–	1.4	16.4	0.9	5.0	—N/a	56.4	2.9
2008 general election	9 Mar 2008	—N/a	28.6	13.5	25.2	–	2.4		0.6	–	—N/a	26.7	3.4
2007 regional election	27 May 2007	—N/a	30.1	16.9	16.0	3.1	3.1		–	–	—N/a	24.6	13.2

=== Victory preferences ===
The table below lists opinion polling on the victory preferences for each party in the event of a regional election taking place.

Polling firm/Commissioner	Fieldwork date	Sample size	UPN	NaBai	PSN–PSOE	CDN	I–E (n)	PP	UPyD	Bildu	Other/ None	Question	Lead
CIS	17 Mar–17 Apr 2011	790	21.3	13.3	12.2	0.5	3.5	5.2	0.5	2.6	14.0	26.9	8.0

=== Victory likelihood ===
The table below lists opinion polling on the perceived likelihood of victory for each party in the event of a regional election taking place.

Polling firm/Commissioner	Fieldwork date	Sample size	UPN	NaBai	PSN–PSOE	CDN	I–E (n)	PP	UPyD	Bildu	Other/ None	Question	Lead
CIS	17 Mar–17 Apr 2011	790	56.3	2.2	5.4	0.0	0.1	8.7	0.1	0.2	1.1	25.8	47.6

=== Preferred President ===
The table below lists opinion polling on leader preferences to become president of the Government of Navarre.

Polling firm/Commissioner	Fieldwork date	Sample size							Other/ None/ Not care	Question	Lead
Polling firm/Commissioner	Fieldwork date	Sample size	Barcina UPN	Zabaleta NaBai	Jiménez PSN	Burguete CDN	Nuin I–E (n)	Cervera PP	Other/ None/ Not care	Question	Lead
CIS	17 Mar–17 Apr 2011	790	26.7	12.8	10.9	1.0	2.0	2.2	11.0	33.4	13.9

== Results ==
← Summary of the 22 May 2011 Parliament of Navarre election results →
Parties and alliances	Popular vote			Seats	
Parties and alliances	Votes	%	±pp	Total	+/−
Navarrese People's Union (UPN)	111,474	34.48	−7.70	19	−3
Socialist Party of Navarre (PSN–PSOE)	51,238	15.85	−6.64	9	−3
Navarre Yes 2011 (NaBai 2011)	49,827	15.41	−8.21	8	−4
Gather–Basque Solidarity–Alternative (Bildu–EA/AE–EA–Alternatiba)	42,916	13.28	New	7	+7
People's Party (PP)	23,551	7.29	New	4	+4
Left (I–E (n))^{1}	18,457	5.71	+1.36	3	+1
Convergence of Democrats of Navarre (CDN)	4,654	1.44	−2.93	0	−2
Greens of Navarre (VN–NB)	4,235	1.31	New	0	±0
Navarrese Cannabis Representation (RCN/NOK)	3,166	0.98	−0.45	0	±0
Union, Progress and Democracy (UPyD)	2,212	0.68	New	0	±0
Initiative for Navarre (IxN)	1,332	0.41	New	0	±0
Internationalist Solidarity and Self-Management (SAIn)	1,054	0.33	New	0	±0
Navarrese and Spanish Right (DNE)	977	0.30	New	0	±0
Blank ballots	8,161	2.52	+1.14		
Total	323,254			50	±0
Valid votes	323,254	98.77	+4.03		
Invalid votes	4,027	1.23	−4.03		
Votes cast / turnout	327,281	67.43	−6.36		
Abstentions	158,105	32.57	+6.36		
Registered voters	485,386				
Sources
Footnotes: ^{1} Left results are compared to United Left of Navarre totals in the 2007 election.

Popular vote
UPN	34.48%
PSN–PSOE	15.85%
NaBai 2011	15.41%
Bildu	13.28%
PP	7.29%
I–E (n)	5.71%
CDN	1.44%
VN–NB	1.31%
Others	2.70%
Blank ballots	2.52%

Seats
UPN	38.00%
PSN–PSOE	18.00%
NaBai 2011	16.00%
Bildu	14.00%
PP	8.00%
I–E (n)	6.00%

== Aftermath ==
=== Government formation ===
Investiture; Nomination of Yolanda Barcina (UPN)
Ballot →	23 June 2011
Required majority →	26 out of 50
Yes: • UPN (19); • PSN (9)	28 / 50
No: • NaBai (8); • Bildu (7); • PP (4); • I–E (n) (3)	22 / 50
Abstentions	0 / 50
Absentees	0 / 50

=== 2013 motion of no confidence ===
Motion of no confidence Nomination of Juan Carlos Longás (NaBai)
Ballot →	18 April 2013
Required majority →	26 out of 50
Yes: • Bildu (7); • Aralar–NaBai (6); • I–E (n) (3); • GBai (2)	18 / 50
No: • UPN (19); • PP (4)	23 / 50
Abstentions: • PSN (9)	9 / 50
Absentees	0 / 50

== Bibliography ==
- Ley Orgánica 13/1982, de 10 de agosto, de reintegración y amejoramiento del Régimen Foral de Navarra (Organic Law 13/1982). Official State Gazette (in Spanish). 10 August 1982 [version as of 28 October 2010]. BOE-A-1982-20824.
- Ley Orgánica 5/1985, de 19 de junio, del Régimen Electoral General (Organic Law 5/1985). Official State Gazette (in Spanish). 19 June 1985 [version as of 30 April 2011]. BOE-A-1985-11672.
- Ley Foral 16/1986, de 17 de noviembre, reguladora de las elecciones al Parlamento de Navarra (Foral Law 16/1986). Official State Gazette (in Spanish). 17 November 1986 [version as of 11 June 2004]. BOE-A-1987-1255.
- Ley Foral 14/2004, de 3 de diciembre, del Gobierno de Navarra y de su Presidente (Foral Law 14/2004). Official State Gazette (in Spanish). 3 December 2004 [version as of 23 May 2008]. BOE-A-2005-1576.
- Decreto Foral 1/2011, de 28 de marzo, del Presidente del Gobierno de Navarra, por el que se convocan elecciones al Parlamento de Navarra (Foral Decree 1/2011). Official State Gazette (in Spanish). 28 March 2011. BOE-A-2011-5622.
