= Opinion polling for the 2008 Spanish general election =

In the run up to the 2008 Spanish general election, various organisations carried out opinion polling to gauge voting intention in Spain during the term of the 8th Cortes Generales. Results of these polls are displayed in this article. The date range for these opinion polls are from the previous general election, held on 14 March 2004, to the day the next election was held, on 9 March 2008.

Voting intention estimates refer mainly to a hypothetical Congress of Deputies election. Polls are listed in reverse chronological order, showing the most recent first and using the dates when the survey fieldwork was done, as opposed to the date of publication. Where the fieldwork dates are unknown, the date of publication is given instead. The highest percentage figure in each polling survey is displayed with its background shaded in the leading party's colour. If a tie ensues, this is applied to the figures with the highest percentages. The "Lead" columns on the right shows the percentage-point difference between the parties with the highest percentages in a poll.

== Electoral polling ==
=== Nationwide polling ===
==== Graphical summary ====
Local regression trend line of poll results from 14 March 2004 to 9 March 2008, with each line corresponding to a political party.

==== Voting intention estimates ====
The table below lists nationwide voting intention estimates. Refusals are generally excluded from the party vote percentages, while question wording and the treatment of "don't know" responses and those not intending to vote may vary between polling organisations. When available, seat projections determined by the polling organisations are displayed below (or in place of) the percentages in a smaller font; 176 seats were required for an absolute majority in the Congress of Deputies.

Color key:

Poll conducted after legal ban on opinion polls Exit poll

Polling firm/Commissioner	Fieldwork date	Sample size	Turnout	PSOE	PP	IU	CiU	ERC	PNV	CC	BNG	UPyD	Lead
2008 general election	9 Mar 2008	—N/a	73.8	43.9; 169	39.9; 154	3.8; 2	3.0; 10	1.2; 3	1.2; 6	0.7; 2	0.8; 2	1.2; 1	4.0
Ipsos/RTVE–FORTA	9 Mar 2008	210,000	?	45.0; 172/176	38.6; 148/152	3.4; 2/3	3.1; 9/11	1.2; 3/4	1.4; 6/7	0.6; 2	0.8; 1/2	1.1; 1	6.4
TNS Demoscopia/Antena 3	9 Mar 2008	40,000	?	43.3; 163/166	38.0; 149/152	5.2; 4/5	3.1; 10	2.3; 6/7	1.6; 7	0.7; 1/2	0.7; 1/2	1.0; 1/2	5.3
Opina/Cadena SER	9 Mar 2008	?	?	44.5; 168/173	37.5; 145/149	5.0; 4	2.5; 9/10	2.0; 6	1.1; 6/7	0.4; 2	0.8; 1/2	0.1; 0	7.0
Demométrica/Telecinco	9 Mar 2008	?	?	44.9; 172/178	36.9; 142/147	5.2; 3/5	2.7; 9/11	1.5; 4/5	1.4; 6/7	–	–	? 0	8.0
GESOP/El Periòdic	7–8 Mar 2008	1,000	72	43.4; 166/170	38.1; 151/155	? 4	? 10/11	? 4/5	? 6	–	–	–	5.3
GESOP/El Periòdic	5–7 Mar 2008	1,000	71	43.0; 162/166	39.0; 154/158	? 3/4	? 9/10	? 5	? 6	–	–	–	4.0
GESOP/El Periòdic	4–6 Mar 2008	1,200	70	42.6; 161/165	38.6; 153/157	? 4	? 8/9	? 5	? 6	–	–	–	4.0
Sigma Dos/The Times	5 Mar 2008	1,000	74–76	43.1	39.3	4.9	2.9	1.6	1.5	–	–	–	3.8
GESOP/El Periòdic	3–5 Mar 2008	1,000	68	42.4; 159/163	39.0; 154/158	? 4/5	? 8/9	? 5	? 6	–	–	–	3.4
GESOP/El Periòdic	3–4 Mar 2008	600	68	41.5; 156/160	39.0; 156/160	? 4/6	? 8/9	? 5/6	? 6/7	–	–	–	2.5
Demo Ibérica/COPE	3 Mar 2008	?	70.9	42.1; 157/160	39.8; 154/158	? 5	? 10/11	? 6	? 7	? 2	? 2	? 0/1	2.3
Opina/Cadena SER	2 Mar 2008	?	74	43.5	38.0	5.0	2.8	1.6	1.2	–	–	–	5.5
Demométrica/Telecinco	29 Feb–2 Mar 2008	3,000	?	44.1; 169/176	38.0; 146/153	5.2; 4/5	? 9/10	? 4/5	–	–	–	? 1	6.1
Ipsos/Faro de Vigo	29 Feb–2 Mar 2008	?	72–74	43.4; 162/168	38.5; 148/154	5.3; 5/8	3.0; 10/11	1.9; 5/6	1.6; 7	0.6; 2	0.8; 1/2	–	4.9
Opina/Cadena SER	1 Mar 2008	3,000	72	44.0; 164/170	38.0; 152/154	5.0; 5	2.7; 9/10	1.5; 5	1.2; 6/7	–	–	–	6.0
Demométrica/Telecinco	28 Feb–1 Mar 2008	3,000	?	44.3	38.0	–	–	–	–	–	–	–	6.3
Sigma Dos/El Mundo	20 Feb–1 Mar 2008	11,000	76–78	43.4; 157/171	39.3; 148/161	4.4; 4	3.2; 9/11	1.9; 5/6	1.5; 7	0.7; 2	0.6; 0/2	0.8; 0/1	4.1
Obradoiro de Socioloxía/Público	18 Feb–1 Mar 2008	7,200	?	43.9; 165/171	39.5; 153/158	4.8; 4	2.7; 8/9	? 4	? 7	? 1	? 0/1	–	4.4
Opina/Cadena SER	29 Feb 2008	?	?	44.0	38.5	5.0	2.7	1.5	1.2	–	–	–	5.5
Intereconomía	29 Feb 2008	?	72	37.6	40.5	5.5	3.4	2.5	1.7	–	–	–	2.9
Demométrica/Telecinco	27–29 Feb 2008	3,000	?	44.6	38.2	–	–	–	–	–	–	–	6.4
Noxa/La Vanguardia	26–29 Feb 2008	1,200	?	43.5; 162/167	39.5; 152/156	4.4; 4/5	2.5; 8/9	1.8; 6	1.3; 6/7	–	–	–	4.0
Infortécnica	1–29 Feb 2008	1,945	?	? 157/163	? 149/155	? 5/9	? 9/11	? 6/8	–	–	–	–	?
Opina/Cadena SER	28 Feb 2008	?	72	44.5	39.5	4.7	2.5	1.5	1.2	–	–	–	5.0
Demométrica/Telecinco	26–28 Feb 2008	3,000	?	44.5	38.4	5.1	–	–	–	–	–	–	6.1
Obradoiro de Socioloxía/Público	26–28 Feb 2008	1,810	?	45.0	38.8	4.5	3.1	1.5	1.5	–	–	–	6.2
DYM/ABC	18–28 Feb 2008	1,075	?	42.0	40.0	4.1	–	–	–	–	–	–	2.0
Opina/Cadena SER	27 Feb 2008	9,000	?	44.0; 165/169	39.0; 153/157	4.0; 3/4	2.3; 8	1.5; 4/5	1.5; 7	–	–	–	5.0
TNS Demoscopia/Antena 3	26–27 Feb 2008	?	75.5	42.3; 162/164	38.5; 154/156	? 4/5	? 9	? 6	? 6/7	–	–	–	3.8
Demométrica/Telecinco	25–27 Feb 2008	3,000	76.3	44.1	38.8	5.2	–	–	–	–	–	–	5.3
Obradoiro de Socioloxía/Público	25–27 Feb 2008	?	?	45.3	38.9	4.7	3.1	1.5	1.5	–	–	–	6.4
Sondaxe/La Voz de Galicia	21–27 Feb 2008	1,300	74.4	43.5	40.0	4.6	2.7	1.7	1.4	–	1.1	1.3	3.5
Metroscopia/El País	8–27 Feb 2008	8,750	74–75	42.9; 165/169	38.8; 148/154	4.8; 4	2.6; 9	1.9; 5/6	1.5; 7	0.6; 2	–	1.1; 0/1	4.1
Demo Ibérica/COPE	26 Feb 2008	?	70.9	41.7; 157/160	39.6; 153/156	? 5/6	? 10	? 6	? 7	? 2	? 2	? 0/1	2.1
Opina/Cadena SER	26 Feb 2008	?	?	44.0	39.0	4.0	2.3	1.5	1.5	–	–	–	5.0
GESOP/El Periódico	26 Feb 2008	600	68	42.5; 165/170	37.0; 149/154	? 4/5	? 8/9	? 5/6	? 6	–	–	–	5.5
Demométrica/Telecinco	19–26 Feb 2008	8,000	?	44.2; 170/177	38.6; 148/152	5.3; 5/7	? 10	? 3/4	? 6	–	–	–	5.6
Obradoiro de Socioloxía/Público	23–26 Feb 2008	?	?	45.3	38.7	4.5	3.1	1.4	1.4	–	–	–	6.6
Opina/Cadena SER	25 Feb 2008	?	?	44.0	39.0	4.0	2.3	1.5	1.5	–	–	–	5.0
Demométrica/Telecinco	23–25 Feb 2008	?	?	43.2	38.5	–	–	–	–	–	–	–	4.7
Obradoiro de Socioloxía/Público	22–25 Feb 2008	1,796	?	45.3	38.5	4.8	3.0	1.3	1.4	–	–	–	6.8
Opina/Cadena SER	24 Feb 2008	?	?	44.0; 163/167	40.0; 154/156	4.5; 4	2.6; 9	1.7; 5	1.4; 7	–	–	–	4.0
Demométrica/Telecinco	22–24 Feb 2008	?	?	42.9	38.7	–	–	–	–	–	–	–	4.2
Ipsos/Expansión	22–24 Feb 2008	?	72–74	41.7	38.2	–	2.8	2.2	1.4	–	–	–	3.5
Opina/Cadena SER	23 Feb 2008	?	?	44.5	41.5	4.0	2.8	1.7	1.2	–	–	–	3.0
Demométrica/Telecinco	21–23 Feb 2008	?	?	43.0	37.9	–	–	–	–	–	–	–	5.1
Obradoiro de Socioloxía/Público	21–23 Feb 2008	?	?	44.7	39.3	4.2	3.1	1.3	1.4	–	–	–	5.4
Demo Ibérica/COPE	22 Feb 2008	?	70.7	41.5; 157/160	39.6; 153/155	? 5/6	3.4; 10/11	? 6	? 7	? 2	? 2	0.7; 0/1	1.9
Opina/Cadena SER	22 Feb 2008	?	?	42.0	40.0	4.0	2.6	1.7	1.3	–	–	–	2.0
Metroscopia/El País	22 Feb 2008	600	73–74	42.3	38.6	4.5	–	–	–	–	–	–	3.7
Demométrica/Telecinco	20–22 Feb 2008	?	?	43.1	37.8	–	–	–	–	–	–	–	5.3
Obradoiro de Socioloxía/Público	20–22 Feb 2008	1,812	?	44.0	40.0	4.5	3.0	1.4	1.3	–	–	–	4.0
Invymark/laSexta	18–22 Feb 2008	?	?	42.7	38.0	–	–	–	–	–	–	–	4.7
Opina/Cadena SER	21 Feb 2008	?	?	41.5; 155/164	40.0; 158/161	4.5; 4/5	2.6; 7/9	1.7; 4/5	1.3; 7/8	–	–	–	1.5
Demométrica/Telecinco	19–21 Feb 2008	?	?	43.3	37.5	–	–	–	–	–	–	–	5.8
Obradoiro de Socioloxía/Público	19–21 Feb 2008	?	?	43.1	40.9	4.3	2.8	1.5	1.4	–	–	–	2.2
DYM/ABC	11–21 Feb 2008	1,074	?	42.0	39.2	3.9	–	–	–	–	–	–	2.8
TNS Demoscopia/Antena 3	18–20 Feb 2008	?	73.6	42.0; 161/164	39.7; 154/157	5.4; 4/5	2.7; 8/9	2.2; 7	1.5; 7	? 2/3	? 1/2	–	2.3
Obradoiro de Socioloxía/Público	18–20 Feb 2008	1,812	?	42.8	40.4	4.6	2.6	1.3	1.4	–	–	–	2.4
Append/Vocento	11–18 Feb 2008	4,989	74.4	41.4	38.8	4.8	3.0	2.0	1.5	0.7	0.6	0.5	2.6
TNS Demoscopia/Antena 3	11–18 Feb 2008	?	72.4	41.8; 162/164	40.2; 155/157	5.4; 4	2.9; 8/9	1.9; 6/7	1.6; 7/8	–	–	–	1.6
Ipsos/Expansión	15–17 Feb 2008	?	72–74	42.3	37.3	4.5	–	–	–	–	–	0.5	5.0
GESOP/El Periódico	11–17 Feb 2008	1,500	65–70	40.5; 159/164	37.0; 153/157	4.9; 4/6	2.6; 9/10	1.7; 5/6	1.4; 6/7	–	–	–	3.5
ASEP (Note: Undecided and/or abstentionists excluded.)	11–17 Feb 2008	1,201	75.5	40.7	38.5	–	–	–	–	–	–	–	2.2
Metroscopia/El País	15 Feb 2008	600	71–72	41.9	38.9	5.0	–	–	–	–	–	–	3.0
Invymark/laSexta	11–15 Feb 2008	?	?	42.8	38.4	–	–	–	–	–	–	–	4.4
Noxa/La Vanguardia	8–14 Feb 2008	1,800	?	43.1; 165	39.1; 152	5.0; 5	3.0; 10	1.5; 5	1.4; 6	–	–	–	4.0
DYM/ABC	4–14 Feb 2008	1,057	?	42.2	39.2	3.9	–	–	–	–	–	–	3.0
Obradoiro de Socioloxía/Público	7 Jan–12 Feb 2008	12,000	?	42.6; 158/169	40.1; 154/163	4.9; 4	2.6; 8/10	1.3; 4	1.3; 6/7	? 1/2	? 2	–	2.5
Ipsos/Expansión	8–10 Feb 2008	?	69–70	41.1	39.8	5.1	–	–	–	–	–	–	1.3
TNS Demoscopia/Antena 3	4–10 Feb 2008	?	73.4	42.7; 165/168	39.1; 151/153	4.9; 4/5	2.7; 8	? 7	1.7; 7	? 2	–	? 0	3.6
Metroscopia/El País	8 Feb 2008	600	70–71	41.7	38.8	5.3	–	–	–	–	–	–	2.9
Obradoiro de Socioloxía/Público	28 Jan–8 Feb 2008	4,008	?	44.0	38.5	4.9	2.8	1.5	1.6	–	–	–	5.5
Sigma Dos/El Mundo	4–7 Feb 2008	1,000	?	41.8	39.2	5.2	3.2	2.1	1.6	–	–	–	2.6
DYM/ABC	28 Jan–7 Feb 2008	1,031	?	42.4	39.2	4.1	–	–	–	–	–	–	3.2
Simple Lógica	23 Jan–4 Feb 2008	2,031	72.7	40.6	38.4	5.1	2.7	–	1.4	–	–	–	2.2
CIS	21 Jan–4 Feb 2008	18,221	?	40.2; 158/163	38.7; 153/157	5.8; 5/6	3.0; 10	2.1; 6	1.7; 7	0.6; 1/2	0.9; 2	0.6; 0/1	1.5
DYM/ABC	21–31 Jan 2008	1,015	?	42.4	38.6	4.2	–	–	–	–	–	–	3.8
Obradoiro de Socioloxía/Público	21–31 Jan 2008	4,009	72	44.6	38.2	5.0	3.0	1.3	1.6	–	–	–	6.4
TNS Demoscopia/Antena 3	29–30 Jan 2008	?	?	42.5; 164/166	39.3; 154/156	4.6; 3	2.8; 9	? 6	1.5; 6/7	? 2	? 2	–	3.2
Metroscopia/El País	26–30 Jan 2008	2,000	73–74	42.0	38.6	5.1	–	–	–	–	–	–	3.4
TNS Demoscopia/Antena 3	28 Jan 2008	?	73.0	42.3; 162/166	39.6; 151/155	4.5; 4	3.0; 9/10	1.6; 6	1.5; 7/8	? 2/3	–	? 1	2.7
Celeste-Tel/Terra	22–28 Jan 2008	10,910	72.9	43.7– 44.1; 164/168	41.3– 41.7; 152/154	4.0– 4.2; 2/5	3.2– 3.3; 10	1.1– 1.2; 3	1.2– 1.3; 6/7	0.8; 2/3	0.9; 2	1.4– 1.5; 1	2.4
Invymark/laSexta	21–25 Jan 2008	1,100	?	43.1	38.1	–	–	–	–	–	–	–	5.0
Obradoiro de Socioloxía/Público	14–24 Jan 2008	4,007	?	44.5	38.7	4.6	2.8	1.5	1.6	–	–	–	5.8
Opina/Cadena SER	23 Jan 2008	1,000	?	44.0	38.0	3.5	3.0	1.9	1.6	–	–	–	6.0
TNS Demoscopia/Antena 3	21 Jan 2008	?	71.5	41.6; 160/164	39.5; 149/153	5.1; 4/5	3.1; 10/11	2.0; 6/7	1.5; 7/8	0.8; 3	–	2.0; 1	2.1
ASEP	14–20 Jan 2008	1,203	75.6	40.3	38.9	–	–	–	–	–	–	–	1.4
Obradoiro de Socioloxía/Público	7–17 Jan 2008	4,000	?	42.8	39.2	5.0	2.6	1.7	1.6	–	–	–	3.6
Noxa/La Vanguardia	11–16 Jan 2008	1,000	?	42.3; 162/164	39.8; 154/156	5.1; 5	2.5; 8	1.8; 6	1.5; 7	–	–	–	2.5
TNS Demoscopia/Antena 3	14 Jan 2008	?	72.0	41.9; 160/164	40.1; 151/155	4.8; 4/5	3.3; 10/11	1.8; 5/6	1.6; 7/8	? 2/3	? 1/2	? 0	1.8
Ipsos/Expansión	11–13 Jan 2008	?	68–70	41.5	39.5	–	–	–	–	–	–	–	2.0
Opina/Cadena SER	9 Jan 2008	1,000	?	43.0	40.0	3.5	3.0	1.5	1.4	–	–	–	3.0
Invymark/laSexta	24–28 Dec 2007	?	?	43.2	38.4	–	–	–	–	–	–	–	4.8
Sigma Dos/El Mundo	14–26 Dec 2007	10,400	?	41.9; 153/164	39.4; 151/162	5.0; 5	3.4; 10/11	2.2; 7	1.5; 7	? 3	? 1/2	? 0	2.5
Obradoiro de Socioloxía/Público	20 Nov–21 Dec 2007	9,100	72	43.0; 167	38.5; 151	5.6; 6	2.7; 9	1.6; 5	1.6; 7	? 2	? 2	0.9; 0	4.5
Ipsos/Expansión	14–16 Dec 2007	1,000	66–68	41.3	38.0	5.3	3.2	2.1	1.5	–	–	1.3	3.3
ASEP	10–16 Dec 2007	1,199	76.3	40.4	37.1	–	–	–	–	–	–	–	3.3
Invymark/laSexta	10–14 Dec 2007	?	?	42.4	38.9	–	–	–	–	–	–	–	3.5
Noxa/La Vanguardia	28 Nov–12 Dec 2007	2,000	?	42.5; 158/162	39.7; 152/156	5.3; 5/6	2.8; 10	1.7; 5/6	1.9; 7/9	–	–	–	2.8
TNS Demoscopia/Antena 3	11 Dec 2007	?	73.2	42.0	38.2	5.5	3.2	1.9	1.4	–	–	1.0	3.8
Opina/Cadena SER	4 Dec 2007	1,000	?	45.0	37.5	4.5	3.0	1.5	1.5	–	–	–	7.5
Obradoiro de Socioloxía/Público	2 Dec 2007	?	?	42.5	37.4	5.2	2.8	2.0	1.5	–	–	–	5.1
Intercampo/GETS	22 Nov 2007	?	High	40.7	38.4	5.3	3.3	2.0	1.7	–	–	–	2.3
Intercampo/GETS	22 Nov 2007	?	Low	41.3	38.5	5.1	3.8	2.3	1.8	–	–	–	2.8
Opina/Cadena SER	21 Nov 2007	1,000	?	45.0	38.0	4.0	3.2	1.7	1.9	–	–	–	7.0
ASEP	12–18 Nov 2007	1,203	77.6	42.8	36.4	–	–	–	–	–	–	–	6.4
GESOP/El Periódico	12–17 Nov 2007	1,500	?	43.5; 165/170	37.6; 145/150	5.0; 4/5	2.8; 9/10	1.8; 6/7	1.4; 6/7	–	–	–	5.9
TNS Demoscopia/Antena 3	13 Nov 2007	?	72.1	41.4	39.0	5.5	2.7	2.3	1.5	0.8	0.9	0.8	2.4
Ipsos/Expansión	9–11 Nov 2007	?	68–70	41.4	38.3	5.2	3.0	2.1	1.6	–	–	1.6	3.1
Invymark/laSexta	5–9 Nov 2007	?	?	42.0	38.5	–	–	–	–	–	–	–	3.5
Sigma Dos/El Mundo	7–8 Nov 2007	800	?	42.2	39.1	4.8	3.0	2.2	1.3	–	–	–	3.1
Opina/Cadena SER	6 Nov 2007	1,000	?	44.5	38.0	4.0	3.0	1.9	1.4	–	–	–	6.5
Obradoiro de Socioloxía/Público	4 Nov 2007	?	?	41.7	38.6	4.7	2.9	2.2	1.4	–	–	–	3.1
Invymark/laSexta	29 Oct–2 Nov 2007	1,100	?	42.6	38.0	–	–	–	–	–	–	–	4.6
CIS	22–29 Oct 2007	2,493	?	39.7	37.4	5.5	3.1	2.1	1.5	–	–	–	2.3
Opina/Cadena SER	23 Oct 2007	1,000	?	44.0	39.0	3.3	3.2	1.9	1.4	–	–	–	5.0
ASEP	15–21 Oct 2007	1,202	76.2	40.9	38.8	6.0	–	–	–	–	–	–	2.1
Ipsos/Expansión	12–15 Oct 2007	?	66–68	42.7	38.1	4.9	3.1	2.0	1.8	–	–	–	4.6
TNS Demoscopia/Antena 3	10 Oct 2007	?	70.2	40.6	39.5	5.2	3.2	2.3	1.4	0.7	0.9	0.9	1.1
Opina/Cadena SER	9 Oct 2007	1,000	?	44.0	39.0	3.3	3.0	2.3	1.8	–	–	–	5.0
DYM/ABC	1–4 Oct 2007	1,000	?	41.2	39.3	4.5	–	–	–	–	–	–	1.9
Noxa/La Vanguardia	28 Sep–3 Oct 2007	1,000	?	42.3; 163/164	39.6; 154/155	5.7; 5/6	2.5; 8/9	1.6; 5/6	1.1; 5/6	–	–	–	2.7
Obradoiro de Socioloxía/Público	21–28 Sep 2007	3,067	?	41.0	38.8	4.9	3.1	2.5	1.4	–	–	–	2.2
Opina/Cadena SER	26 Sep 2007	?	?	44.0	39.0	5.0	2.5	1.7	1.2	–	–	–	5.0
ASEP	17–23 Sep 2007	1,213	77.3	42.6	37.1	6.0	–	–	–	–	–	–	5.5
Invymark/laSexta	10–14 Sep 2007	?	?	42.2	38.8	–	–	–	–	–	–	–	3.4
Opina/Cadena SER	13 Sep 2007	?	?	44.0	38.0	5.0	3.5	1.8	1.2	–	–	–	6.0
TNS Demoscopia/Antena 3	11 Sep 2007	?	71.6	41.8	38.0	–	–	–	–	–	–	–	3.8
Ipsos/Expansión	7–10 Sep 2007	?	68–70	40.3	39.8	5.5	2.8	1.9	1.8	–	–	–	0.5
Sigma Dos/El Mundo	28–31 Aug 2007	800	?	41.1	39.7	5.4	2.7	2.3	1.6	–	–	–	1.4
Opina/Cadena SER	29 Aug 2007	1,000	?	44.0	39.5	3.5	4.5	1.9	1.3	–	–	–	4.5
CIS	6–18 Jul 2007	2,483	?	40.5	37.0	6.1	2.9	1.9	1.5	–	–	–	3.5
TNS Demoscopia/Antena 3	17 Jul 2007	?	69.3	41.7	39.5	5.5	3.2	–	–	–	–	–	2.2
ASEP	9–15 Jul 2007	1,200	75.1	43.1	36.4	5.6	–	–	–	–	–	–	6.7
Invymark/laSexta	9–13 Jul 2007	?	?	42.8	38.2	–	–	–	–	–	–	–	4.6
Noxa/La Vanguardia	6–8 Jul 2007	1,000	?	44.1; 168/169	37.9; 148/149	5.4; 5/6	2.8; 9/10	2.0; 6/7	1.4; 6/7	–	–	–	6.2
Ipsos/Expansión	6–8 Jul 2007	?	70–71	43.1	39.4	5.0	2.2	1.7	1.4	–	–	–	3.7
Metroscopia/ABC	4–5 Jul 2007	1,000	?	43.3	39.3	5.4	–	–	–	–	–	–	4.0
Opina/Cadena SER	4 Jul 2007	?	?	45.0	38.5	5.0	4.5	1.7	1.5	–	–	–	6.5
TNS Demoscopia/Antena 3	19 Jun 2007	?	70.9	41.0	40.3	5.3	3.1	2.0	1.5	0.7	0.8	–	0.7
ASEP	11–17 Jun 2007	1,213	74.2	41.5	38.4	4.9	–	–	–	–	–	–	3.1
GESOP/El Periódico	13–15 Jun 2007	800	?	42.2	39.2	5.5	3.0	1.7	1.3	–	–	–	3.0
Iberconsulta/La Razón	11–13 Jun 2007	1,000	73.3	39.7	40.6	5.3	–	–	–	–	–	–	0.9
Opina/Cadena SER	12 Jun 2007	1,000	?	43.0	40.0	5.0	3.0	2.0	1.5	–	–	–	3.0
Ipsos/Expansión	1–3 Jun 2007	?	69–70	40.4	39.1	5.4	2.9	2.1	1.6	–	–	–	1.3
Opina/Cadena SER	30 May 2007	1,000	?	44.0	38.0	5.0	2.5	1.5	1.5	–	–	–	6.0
2007 local elections	27 May 2007	—N/a	64.0	34.9	35.6	6.6	3.3	1.6	1.4	1.0	1.4	–	0.7
ASEP	14–20 May 2007	1,213	79.6	41.6	36.8	5.3	–	–	–	–	–	–	4.8
Ipsos/Expansión	11–13 May 2007	?	70–71	40.8	37.6	5.3	3.0	2.2	1.6	–	–	–	3.2
TNS Demoscopia/Antena 3	9 May 2007	?	67.5	40.6	39.8	–	–	–	–	–	–	–	0.8
CIS	23–29 Apr 2007	2,455	?	39.6	36.6	5.6	3.0	2.4	1.6	–	–	–	3.0
ASEP	16–22 Apr 2007	1,212	75.8	41.0	36.4	6.1	–	–	–	–	–	–	4.6
Metroscopia/ABC	16–18 Apr 2007	1,002	70	42.4	40.9	4.2	–	–	–	–	–	–	1.5
TNS Demoscopia/Antena 3	17 Apr 2007	?	67.1	39.8	39.6	5.6	3.1	2.2	1.5	0.8	0.9	–	0.2
Ipsos/Expansión	13–15 Apr 2007	?	69–70	39.9	37.2	5.4	3.2	2.1	1.7	–	–	–	2.7
Opina/Cadena SER	11 Apr 2007	1,000	?	43.0	38.0	5.5	3.5	1.8	1.5	–	–	–	5.0
Sigma Dos/El Mundo	30 Mar–2 Apr 2007	800	?	41.5	40.3	4.8	3.0	1.9	1.5	–	–	–	1.2
Opina/El País	21–22 Mar 2007	1,000	?	42.0	38.5	5.0	3.8	2.0	1.0	–	–	–	3.5
ASEP	12–18 Mar 2007	1,203	76.5	41.5	37.0	4.4	–	–	–	–	–	–	4.5
Opina/Cadena SER	15 Mar 2007	1,000	?	43.0	38.0	5.5	3.5	2.0	1.5	–	–	–	5.0
GESOP/El Periódico	11–15 Mar 2007	1,500	?	41.9	39.7	5.8	2.9	1.9	1.2	–	–	–	2.2
Iberconsulta/La Razón	9–14 Mar 2007	800	?	38.4; 145/147	42.2; 161/163	5.7; 7	3.4; 11	2.6; 9	1.7; 7	1.0; 3	0.9; 2	–	3.8
Ipsos/Expansión	9–11 Mar 2007	?	68–69	38.5	38.3	5.6	3.4	1.9	1.7	–	–	–	0.2
Opina/Cadena SER	7 Mar 2007	1,000	?	43.0	40.0	5.0	3.0	2.0	1.0	–	–	–	3.0
Opina/Cadena SER	23 Feb 2007	1,000	?	44.0	38.0	5.0	3.6	1.7	1.5	–	–	–	6.0
ASEP	12–18 Feb 2007	1,208	73.5	40.8	38.4	5.3	–	–	–	–	–	–	2.4
Opina/Cadena SER	7 Feb 2007	?	?	43.0	38.0	3.5	3.0	1.9	1.5	–	–	–	5.0
Invymark/laSexta	29 Jan–2 Feb 2007	?	?	42.2	37.8	–	–	–	–	–	–	–	4.4
Metroscopia/ABC	29–31 Jan 2007	1,001	?	40.1	42.7	6.1	–	–	–	–	–	–	2.6
CIS	22–31 Jan 2007	2,472	?	38.8	37.6	6.5	3.2	2.0	1.4	–	–	–	1.2
Intereconomía	25 Jan 2007	?	73.4	38.1	41.8	5.1	3.0	2.1	1.7	–	–	–	3.7
ASEP	15–21 Jan 2007	1,201	75.0	42.3	36.3	4.5	–	–	–	–	–	–	6.0
Noxa/La Vanguardia	15–18 Jan 2007	1,000	?	42.0; 161/164	34.8; 138/142	7.1; 13	3.9; 13/14	2.0; 6	1.7; 7	–	–	–	7.2
Opina/Cadena SER	17 Jan 2007	?	?	44.0	38.0	3.5	3.5	2.0	1.5	–	–	–	6.0
Metra Seis/Colpisa	7–15 Jan 2007	2,000	?	38.3; 142/152	40.7; 163/169	5.7; 6/7	3.1; 11/12	2.0; 7	1.7; 7	? 3	–	–	2.4
Opina/Cadena SER	4 Jan 2007	1,000	?	42.0	40.0	4.0	3.5	2.5	1.4	–	–	–	2.0
Sigma Dos/El Mundo	2–4 Jan 2007	800	?	40.2	40.7	5.2	3.0	2.2	1.6	–	–	–	0.5
Metroscopia/ABC	3 Jan 2007	605	72	41.1	40.4	5.9	–	–	–	–	–	–	0.7
Intereconomía	28 Dec 2006	?	72.6	38.7	39.1	5.7	2.9	2.3	1.9	–	–	–	0.4
Sigma Dos/El Mundo	26–28 Dec 2006	800	?	40.7	40.5	5.0	3.0	2.3	1.5	–	–	–	0.2
ASEP	11–17 Dec 2006	1,191	75.1	40.9	36.3	5.1	–	–	–	–	–	–	4.6
Opina/Cadena SER	12 Dec 2006	?	?	44.0	38.0	5.5	3.0	1.7	1.9	–	–	–	6.0
Ipsos/PSOE	12 Dec 2006	?	?	42.0	36.0	–	–	–	–	–	–	–	6.0
Opina/Cadena SER	30 Nov 2006	?	?	44.0	39.0	4.5	3.5	2.0	2.0	–	–	–	5.0
ASEP	20–26 Nov 2006	1,206	75.7	42.2	37.0	5.4	–	–	–	–	–	–	5.2
Opina/Cadena SER	16 Nov 2006	1,000	?	45.0	39.0	4.5	3.0	2.0	0.9	–	–	–	6.0
Opina/Cadena SER	2 Nov 2006	1,000	?	44.0	39.0	4.5	3.3	2.0	1.9	–	–	–	5.0
Intereconomía	27 Oct 2006	?	70.9	39.3	40.2	5.0	2.8	2.0	1.6	–	–	–	0.9
CIS	18–25 Oct 2006	2,481	?	39.3	37.9	5.1	3.1	2.8	1.7	–	–	–	1.4
ASEP	16–22 Oct 2006	1,200	73.1	40.3	38.5	4.9	–	–	–	–	–	–	1.8
Intercampo/GETS	19 Sep–22 Oct 2006	1,735	High	40.4	38.9	5.2	3.0	2.4	1.5	–	–	–	1.5
Intercampo/GETS	19 Sep–22 Oct 2006	1,735	Low	40.3	39.7	4.9	2.8	2.6	1.3	–	–	–	0.6
Sigma Dos/El Mundo	6–9 Oct 2006	800	?	42.9	39.4	4.4	2.7	2.0	1.6	–	–	–	3.5
Metroscopia/ABC	29 Sep–4 Oct 2006	1,000	73	42.7	38.3	5.6	–	–	–	–	–	–	4.4
Opina/Cadena SER	28 Sep 2006	?	?	43.0	37.0	4.5	3.0	1.3	1.3	–	–	–	6.0
Intereconomía	28 Sep 2006	?	71.7	39.1	38.8	5.6	3.2	2.0	1.7	–	–	–	0.3
ASEP	17–24 Sep 2006	1,202	75.5	41.2	38.5	–	–	–	–	–	–	–	2.7
Opina/Cadena SER	13 Sep 2006	?	?	43.0	39.0	4.0	3.0	1.3	1.0	–	–	–	4.0
Opina/Cadena SER	31 Aug 2006	?	?	43.0	38.0	3.5	4.0	1.5	1.0	–	–	–	5.0
Intereconomía	27 Jul 2006	?	72.2	38.7	39.0	5.7	3.1	2.4	1.9	–	–	–	0.3
CIS	10–16 Jul 2006	2,482	?	40.6	36.9	5.0	3.2	2.1	1.4	–	–	–	3.7
Opina/El País	14 Jul 2006	800	?	45.0	39.0	3.5	3.5	2.5	1.8	–	–	–	6.0
Noxa/La Vanguardia	10–13 Jul 2006	1,000	?	44.4; 169/173	36.8; 142/145	4.8; 4/6	3.2; 10	1.8; 6	1.5; 6/7	–	–	–	7.6
ASEP	3–9 Jul 2006	1,213	75.1	42.9	37.3	–	–	–	–	–	–	–	5.6
GESOP/El Periódico	30 Jun–4 Jul 2006	1,000	?	42.8	38.8	5.4	3.0	2.2	1.8	–	–	–	4.0
Opina/Cadena SER	21–22 Jun 2006	1,000	?	45.0	38.0	4.0	4.0	2.5	1.5	–	–	–	7.0
ASEP	5–11 Jun 2006	1,205	78.0	41.3	35.9	–	–	–	–	–	–	–	5.4
Intereconomía	2–5 Jun 2006	?	72.6	40.1	39.2	5.5	2.9	2.1	1.7	–	–	–	0.9
Metroscopia/ABC	2 Jun 2006	?	73	43.8	36.7	5.0	–	–	–	–	–	–	7.1
Opina/El País	1 Jun 2006	800	?	45.0	38.0	4.5	2.5	2.0	1.0	–	–	–	7.0
Opina/Cadena SER	31 May 2006	?	?	45.0	39.0	5.5	3.0	2.0	1.5	–	–	–	6.0
Sigma Dos/El Mundo	24–25 May 2006	800	?	41.7	40.2	4.6	2.8	2.2	1.5	–	–	–	1.5
Opina/Cadena SER	19 May 2006	?	?	45.0	38.0	4.5	2.0	1.0	1.5	–	–	–	7.0
ASEP	8–14 May 2006	1,201	76.8	41.5	37.9	–	–	–	–	–	–	–	3.6
Opina/Cadena SER	5 May 2006	1,000	?	45.0	40.0	3.5	3.0	2.0	1.8	–	–	–	5.0
CIS	24–30 Apr 2006	2,481	?	40.3	38.2	5.4	2.9	2.0	1.4	–	–	–	2.1
GESOP/El Periódico	19–22 Apr 2006	1,002	?	43.3	39.5	5.4	2.8	2.3	1.5	–	–	–	3.8
Opina/Cadena SER	20 Apr 2006	1,000	?	46.0	38.0	4.0	3.5	2.0	1.0	–	–	–	8.0
Iberconsulta/La Razón	10–11 Apr 2006	800	?	43.7; 165/166	38.2; 149/150	5.1; 5	3.2; 11	2.3; 7	1.7; 6	0.9; 2	1.0; 2	–	5.5
ASEP	3–9 Apr 2006	1,204	75.8	43.5	38.1	–	–	–	–	–	–	–	5.4
Opina/Cadena SER	30 Mar 2006	1,000	?	44.0	39.0	4.0	2.5	2.5	1.7	–	–	–	5.0
Metroscopia/ABC	28–30 Mar 2006	1,003	74	44.5	36.8	5.0	–	–	–	–	–	–	7.7
Sigma Dos/PP	23–27 Mar 2006	1,000	?	42.3	39.6	5.2	3.0	–	1.5	–	–	–	2.7
Ipsos/PSOE	24–26 Mar 2006	?	?	45.6	37.7	4.6	–	–	–	–	–	–	7.9
Opina/El País	24 Mar 2006	1,000	?	46.0	38.0	4.5	4.0	2.0	1.5	–	–	–	8.0
Opina/Cadena SER	23 Mar 2006	?	?	46.0	37.0	4.0	2.5	2.3	1.5	–	–	–	9.0
Opina/Cadena SER	15–16 Mar 2006	1,000	?	43.0	39.0	4.0	3.5	2.0	1.2	–	–	–	4.0
ASEP	6–12 Mar 2006	1,200	76.9	41.0	38.4	–	–	–	–	–	–	–	2.6
Sigma Dos/El Mundo	7–9 Mar 2006	1,000	?	40.8	40.7	5.0	2.5	–	1.6	–	–	–	0.1
Opina/Cadena SER	2 Mar 2006	1,000	?	45.0	40.0	5.0	2.5	2.0	1.4	–	–	–	5.0
Opina/Cadena SER	16 Feb 2006	1,000	?	42.0	39.0	4.0	3.0	2.0	1.4	–	–	–	3.0
ASEP	6–12 Feb 2006	1,209	74.9	37.8	40.2	–	–	–	–	–	–	–	2.4
Opina/Cadena SER	2 Feb 2006	1,000	?	41.0	40.0	4.5	4.0	1.5	1.0	–	–	–	1.0
GESOP/El Periódico	30 Jan–2 Feb 2006	1,000	?	41.9	40.1	5.5	2.9	2.0	1.4	–	–	–	1.8
Noxa/La Vanguardia	30 Jan–2 Feb 2006	1,000	?	41.3; 149/154	42.6; 161/165	5.3; 5/7	2.8; 10	1.8; 6	1.5; 6/7	–	–	–	1.3
CIS	23–29 Jan 2006	2,484	?	39.6	38.0	4.9	3.6	2.4	1.5	–	–	–	1.6
Opina/El País	26–27 Jan 2006	1,000	?	41.0	40.0	4.0	3.0	2.0	1.5	–	–	–	1.0
Opina/Cadena SER	21 Jan 2006	?	?	42.0	39.0	5.0	3.5	1.7	1.5	–	–	–	3.0
Metroscopia/ABC	10–17 Jan 2006	1,000	73	39.3	40.4	5.6	–	–	–	–	–	–	1.1
ASEP	9–15 Jan 2006	1,207	76.4	39.8	39.7	–	–	–	–	–	–	–	0.1
Opina/Cadena SER	3 Jan 2006	1,000	?	42.0	39.0	5.0	3.5	2.5	1.5	–	–	–	3.0
Sigma Dos/El Mundo	26–28 Dec 2005	800	?	41.5	40.5	4.7	2.8	2.1	1.6	–	–	–	1.0
ASEP	12–18 Dec 2005	1,207	76.7	40.1	40.4	–	–	–	–	–	–	–	0.3
Iberconsulta/La Razón	5–16 Dec 2005	800	73.2	39.8; 151/152	40.0; 158/159	6.3; 5	3.6; 11	? 9	1.7; 7	? 3	? 2	–	0.2
Opina/Cadena SER	7 Dec 2005	?	?	42.5	40.0	4.5	3.5	2.0	1.1	–	–	–	2.5
ASEP	14–20 Nov 2005	1,205	78.1	41.2	38.1	–	–	–	–	–	–	–	3.1
Opina/Cadena SER	17 Nov 2005	1,000	?	42.0	40.0	4.5	3.5	2.3	1.0	–	–	–	2.0
Noxa/La Vanguardia	7–11 Nov 2005	1,200	?	40.1; 145/150	42.5; 163/167	5.6; 7	3.1; 10	1.9; 6	1.8; 7	–	? 1/2	–	2.4
Opina/El País	7–8 Nov 2005	1,000	?	41.0	40.0	5.5	3.5	2.5	1.5	–	–	–	1.0
Iberconsulta/La Razón	3–4 Nov 2005	800	74.2	39.5; 153/155	39.1; 154/156	6.6; 6	3.6; 11	? 8	1.8; 7	? 3	? 2	–	0.4
Opina/Cadena SER	3 Nov 2005	1,000	?	41.0	40.5	4.5	3.5	2.9	1.0	–	–	–	0.5
CIS	21–28 Oct 2005	2,489	?	39.7	37.7	4.8	3.4	2.4	1.5	–	–	–	2.0
ASEP	17–23 Oct 2005	1,204	76.5	40.1	38.2	–	–	–	–	–	–	–	1.9
Opina/Cadena SER	14 Oct 2005	1,000	?	42.0	40.5	4.0	3.5	2.4	1.0	–	–	–	1.5
GESOP/El Periódico	9–11 Oct 2005	1,000	?	41.2	39.9	5.7	2.8	2.4	1.6	–	–	–	1.3
Intercampo/GETS	19 Sep–11 Oct 2005	1,721	High	39.6	38.1	5.3	3.7	–	1.6	–	–	–	1.5
Intercampo/GETS	19 Sep–11 Oct 2005	1,721	Low	39.9	37.8	5.4	3.0	–	1.8	–	–	–	2.1
Sigma Dos/El Mundo	4–6 Oct 2005	1,000	?	40.1	40.6	5.4	3.1	–	1.6	–	–	–	0.5
Opina/El País	4–6 Oct 2005	1,300	?	42.0	40.0	4.0	2.9	2.4	1.7	–	–	–	2.0
Opina/Cadena SER	1 Oct 2005	?	?	42.0	40.0	5.0	2.5	2.0	1.8	–	–	–	2.0
Metroscopia/ABC	23–29 Sep 2005	1,000	75	41.6	38.2	5.3	–	–	–	–	–	–	3.4
ASEP	19–25 Sep 2005	1,216	76.4	41.4	37.3	–	–	–	–	–	–	–	4.1
Opina/El País	19–20 Sep 2005	1,000	?	44.0	38.0	4.5	3.2	2.5	1.5	–	–	–	6.0
Opina/Cadena SER	15 Sep 2005	1,000	?	44.0	39.0	3.7	3.1	2.5	1.8	–	–	–	5.0
Opina/Cadena SER	1 Sep 2005	?	?	45.0	37.0	5.0	3.0	2.3	1.7	–	–	–	8.0
Sigma Dos/El Mundo	26–28 Jul 2005	1,000	?	42.5	39.1	5.1	3.0	–	1.6	–	–	–	3.4
CIS	13–21 Jul 2005	2,425	?	41.9	36.4	5.1	3.2	2.3	1.8	–	–	–	5.5
ASEP	4–10 Jul 2005	1,216	78.2	40.8	37.0	–	–	–	–	–	–	–	3.8
Noxa/La Vanguardia	4–7 Jul 2005	1,000	?	45.8; 172/176	36.4; 136/142	5.6; 7/8	3.0; 10	1.6; 5/6	1.5; 6	–	–	–	9.4
Metroscopia/ABC	1–6 Jul 2005	1,000	69	43.8	37.4	3.5	–	–	–	–	–	–	6.4
Opina/Cadena SER	29 Jun 2005	1,000	?	45.5	39.0	5.0	2.3	2.3	1.5	–	–	–	6.5
GESOP/El Periódico	27–29 Jun 2005	1,000	?	42.8	37.9	6.0	2.8	2.6	1.7	–	–	–	4.9
ASEP	6–12 Jun 2005	1,222	77.4	42.2	37.5	–	–	–	–	–	–	–	4.7
Opina/Cadena SER	19 May 2005	?	?	45.0	38.0	3.8	3.2	2.5	1.5	–	–	–	7.0
ASEP	9–15 May 2005	1,200	77.6	43.3	36.5	–	–	–	–	–	–	–	6.8
Opina/Cadena SER	12 May 2005	1,000	?	45.5	38.0	4.0	3.0	2.0	1.7	–	–	–	7.5
Metroscopia/ABC	27 Apr–5 May 2005	1,000	70	44.3	37.3	5.0	–	–	–	–	–	–	7.0
CIS	27 Apr–4 May 2005	2,477	?	41.2	36.6	5.2	3.1	2.1	1.6	–	–	–	4.6
GESOP/El Periódico	22–26 Apr 2005	1,003	?	43.2	38.2	5.9	2.8	2.2	1.6	–	–	–	5.0
Opina/Cadena SER	21 Apr 2005	1,000	?	43.0	38.0	5.0	3.2	1.7	1.8	–	–	–	5.0
ASEP	11–17 Apr 2005	1,212	76.7	42.3	37.5	–	–	–	–	–	–	–	4.8
Celeste-Tel/La Razón	4–7 Apr 2005	800	?	42.3; 158/159	38.6; 152/153	5.4; 5	3.2; 10/11	? 7/8	1.8; 7	? 3	? 2/3	–	3.7
ASEP	14–19 Mar 2005	1,203	76.5	45.8	36.5	–	–	–	–	–	–	–	9.3
Sigma Dos/El Mundo	8–10 Mar 2005	800	?	43.7	38.0	4.5	2.7	2.6	1.5	–	–	–	5.7
Opina/Cadena SER	9 Mar 2005	1,000	?	44.0	38.0	5.0	3.2	1.4	1.7	–	–	–	6.0
Opina/Cadena SER	23 Feb 2005	1,000	?	44.0	39.0	4.0	3.1	2.3	1.4	–	–	–	5.0
ASEP	14–19 Feb 2005	1,203	77.8	45.2	35.5	–	–	–	–	–	–	–	9.7
Noxa/La Vanguardia	7–10 Feb 2005	1,000	?	45.3; 170/173	36.7; 138/141	5.2; 6	3.1; 10	2.4; 7/8	2.1; 8/10	? 3	–	–	8.6
Opina/Cadena SER	2 Feb 2005	1,000	?	45.0	38.0	4.0	2.6	2.6	1.8	–	–	–	7.0
CIS	19–24 Jan 2005	2,495	?	42.4	35.7	5.4	2.9	2.3	1.5	–	–	–	6.7
GESOP/El Periódico	19–22 Jan 2005	1,500	?	43.8	37.8	5.9	2.7	1.8	1.9	–	–	–	6.0
ASEP	17–22 Jan 2005	1,212	79.3	44.7	36.4	–	–	–	–	–	–	–	8.3
Opina/Cadena SER	19 Jan 2005	?	?	45.0	37.0	4.5	2.8	2.5	1.4	–	–	–	8.0
Sigma Dos/El Mundo	4–5 Jan 2005	1,400	?	43.1	38.2	4.9	3.0	–	1.5	–	–	–	4.9
Opina/Cadena SER	4 Jan 2005	1,350	?	44.0	39.0	5.5	3.5	1.5	1.4	–	–	–	5.0
Opina/El País	15–16 Dec 2004	1,000	?	45.0	36.5	4.5	3.5	2.0	1.8	–	–	–	8.5
ASEP	15 Dec 2004	1,212	74.6	41.8	36.5	–	–	–	–	–	–	–	5.3
Opina/Cadena SER	14 Dec 2004	?	?	45.0	37.0	4.5	3.0	2.4	1.8	–	–	–	8.0
Sigma Dos/El Mundo	1–2 Dec 2004	1,000	?	42.8	38.7	4.8	2.6	2.4	1.6	–	–	–	4.1
ASEP	15–20 Nov 2004	1,206	77.2	43.2	37.7	–	–	–	–	–	–	–	5.5
Opina/Cadena SER	18 Nov 2004	?	?	45.0	38.0	4.0	3.5	2.5	1.5	–	–	–	7.0
Opina/Cadena SER	4 Nov 2004	1,000	?	44.0	37.5	4.7	3.0	2.0	1.5	–	–	–	6.5
CIS	21–26 Oct 2004	2,494	?	42.1	36.1	5.5	3.3	2.0	1.7	–	–	–	6.0
Intercampo/GETS	21 Sep–24 Oct 2004	?	?	40.7	36.5	5.8	3.0	–	1.6	–	–	–	4.2
Opina/Cadena SER	21 Oct 2004	1,000	?	44.0	38.0	4.2	3.5	2.5	1.6	–	–	–	6.0
Gallup	1–21 Oct 2004	2,027	78.8	43.8	36.9	4.9	3.2	2.7	1.5	–	–	–	6.9
ASEP	15 Oct 2004	1,212	79.0	44.1	36.1	–	–	–	–	–	–	–	8.0
Opina/Cadena SER	7 Oct 2004	1,000	?	45.0	38.0	4.5	2.5	2.5	1.8	–	–	–	7.0
Sigma Dos/El Mundo	5–7 Oct 2004	?	?	44.3	37.4	5.1	2.5	2.4	1.5	–	–	–	6.9
Celeste-Tel/La Razón	26 Sep 2004	?	73.6	42.5; 158/159	39.3; 152/153	5.0; 5	3.4; 10/11	2.6; 8	? 7	–	–	–	3.2
GESOP/El Periódico	22–24 Sep 2004	1,500	?	43.6	38.3	5.7	2.8	2.1	1.7	–	–	–	5.3
Opina/El País	21–22 Sep 2004	1,000	?	46.0	37.0	5.0	3.0	3.0	1.5	–	–	–	9.0
Gallup	1–21 Sep 2004	2,001	78.1	43.3	37.0	5.2	2.8	2.3	1.6	–	–	–	6.3
Opina/Cadena SER	16 Sep 2004	?	?	46.0	39.0	4.0	3.0	2.5	1.5	–	–	–	7.0
ASEP	15 Sep 2004	1,212	78.1	43.0	36.7	–	–	–	–	–	–	–	6.3
Opina/Cadena SER	2 Sep 2004	?	?	44.5	37.5	4.5	3.5	2.5	2.0	–	–	–	7.0
Gallup	1–26 Aug 2004	2,019	78.7	43.7	37.4	4.9	2.9	2.4	1.6	–	–	–	6.3
Sigma Dos/El Mundo	25 Jul 2004	1,000	?	43.8	37.1	5.3	3.4	–	1.3	–	–	–	6.7
Celeste-Tel/La Razón	12–21 Jul 2004	601	72.0	41.5; 159/160	39.9; 152/153	5.2; 5	3.4; 10/11	2.6; 8	1.7; 7	–	–	–	1.6
Gallup	1–21 Jul 2004	2,019	78.2	42.0	37.8	5.4	3.1	2.5	1.5	–	–	–	4.2
CIS	9–16 Jul 2004	2,487	68.4	44.0	36.8	5.0	2.8	2.6	1.5	–	–	–	7.2
ASEP	15 Jul 2004	1,212	76.0	43.8	37.3	–	–	–	–	–	–	–	6.5
Vox Pública/El Periódico	28–30 Jun 2004	1,504	?	44.2	38.7	5.7	2.5	2.0	1.3	–	–	–	5.5
Gallup	2–23 Jun 2004	2,024	79.5	43.8	36.3	5.2	3.2	2.2	1.6	–	–	–	7.5
Opina/Cadena SER	17 Jun 2004	1,000	?	45.0	37.0	4.5	3.0	2.9	1.5	–	–	–	8.0
ASEP	15 Jun 2004	1,212	73.3	42.7	36.6	–	–	–	–	–	–	–	6.1
2004 EP election	13 Jun 2004	—N/a	45.1	43.5 (163)	41.2 (157)	4.1 (3)	2.4 (9)	1.8 (5)	1.6 (7)	0.6 (3)	0.9 (2)	–	2.3
Sigma Dos/El Mundo	1–2 Jun 2004	1,000	?	42.6	37.9	5.2	–	–	–	–	–	–	4.7
Opina/El País	24 May 2004	1,000	75	45.0	37.0	4.5	2.5	2.5	1.5	–	–	–	8.0
Gallup	3–21 May 2004	2,021	79.6	44.7	35.8	5.4	3.2	2.5	1.5	–	–	–	8.9
ASEP	15 May 2004	1,212	78.9	46.9	33.3	–	–	–	–	–	–	–	13.6
Opina/Cadena SER	13 May 2004	1,000	?	47.0	37.0	4.5	3.0	–	1.0	–	–	–	10.0
CIS	22–27 Apr 2004	2,493	77.6	45.8	35.4	4.9	2.7	2.3	1.3	–	–	–	10.4
Sigma Dos/El Mundo	26 Apr 2004	?	?	45.1	39.2	3.6	–	–	–	–	–	–	5.9
Gallup	1–21 Apr 2004	2,019	79.9	44.1	37.0	5.0	3.2	2.4	1.5	–	–	–	7.1
ASEP	15 Apr 2004	1,212	77.9	44.1	35.5	–	–	–	–	–	–	–	8.6
Vox Pública/El Periódico	13–15 Apr 2004	1,501	?	45.0	36.9	5.5	2.7	2.2	1.4	–	–	–	8.1
Opina/El País	30 Mar 2004	1,000	?	43.6	37.9	5.0	3.0	–	1.7	–	–	–	5.7
Opina/Cadena SER	18 Mar 2004	?	?	45.0	35.0	5.0	3.5	–	1.8	–	–	–	10.0
2004 general election	14 Mar 2004	—N/a	75.7	42.6; 164	37.7; 148	5.0; 5	3.2; 10	2.5; 8	1.6; 7	0.9; 3	0.8; 2	–	4.9

==== Voting preferences ====
The table below lists raw, unweighted voting preferences.

Color key:

Poll conducted after legal ban on opinion polls

Polling firm/Commissioner	Fieldwork date	Sample size	PSOE	PP	IU	CiU	ERC	PNV	CC	BNG	UPyD	Question	X mark	Lead
2008 general election (Note: Does not include non-resident citizens.)	9 Mar 2008	—N/a	32.7	30.0	2.8	2.3	0.9	0.9	0.5	0.6	0.9	—N/a	24.7	2.7
GESOP/El Periòdic	4–6 Mar 2008	1,200	35.8	23.8	–	–	–	–	–	–	–	–	–	12.0
GESOP/El Periòdic	3–5 Mar 2008	1,000	35.0	25.4	–	–	–	–	–	–	–	–	–	9.6
GESOP/El Periòdic	3–4 Mar 2008	600	35.2	25.8	–	–	–	–	–	–	–	–	–	9.4
Obradoiro de Socioloxía/Público	26–28 Feb 2008	1,810	35.6	26.8	2.9	–	–	–	–	–	–	–	–	8.8
Obradoiro de Socioloxía/Público	25–27 Feb 2008	?	36.3	27.1	3.3	–	–	–	–	–	–	–	–	9.2
GESOP/El Periódico	26 Feb 2008	600	37.8	25.8	–	–	–	–	–	–	–	–	–	12.0
Obradoiro de Socioloxía/Público	23–26 Feb 2008	?	35.3	26.2	3.0	–	–	–	–	–	–	–	–	9.1
Obradoiro de Socioloxía/Público	22–25 Feb 2008	1,796	35.0	24.9	3.3	–	–	–	–	–	–	–	–	10.1
Obradoiro de Socioloxía/Público	21–23 Feb 2008	?	33.8	24.9	2.5	–	–	–	–	–	–	–	–	8.9
Obradoiro de Socioloxía/Público	20–22 Feb 2008	1,812	31.3	24.8	2.9	–	–	–	–	–	–	–	–	6.5
Obradoiro de Socioloxía/Público	19–21 Feb 2008	?	30.5	26.0	2.4	–	–	–	–	–	–	–	–	4.5
Obradoiro de Socioloxía/Público	18–20 Feb 2008	1,812	30.6	25.9	3.3	–	–	–	–	–	–	–	–	4.7
ASEP	11–17 Feb 2008	1,200	37.7	25.6	3.6	3.1*	2.6**	*	*	**	0.7	14.4	8.7	12.1
GESOP/El Periódico	11–17 Feb 2008	1,500	38.1	28.8	4.4	1.5	1.1	1.1	–	–	–	14.3	4.0	9.3
Metroscopia/El País	15 Feb 2008	600	36.4	24.9	–	–	–	–	–	–	–	–	–	11.5
Obradoiro de Socioloxía/Público	7 Jan–12 Feb 2008	12,000	33.8	27.6	3.7	–	–	–	–	–	–	–	–	6.2
Metroscopia/El País	8 Feb 2008	600	36.2	24.8	–	–	–	–	–	–	–	–	–	11.4
Obradoiro de Socioloxía/Público	28 Jan–8 Feb 2008	4,008	33.6	26.3	3.4	–	–	–	–	–	–	–	–	7.3
Simple Lógica	23 Jan–4 Feb 2008	2,031	23.3	16.0	2.6	1.1	0.5	–	–	–	–	38.3	12.0	7.3
CIS	21 Jan–4 Feb 2008	18,221	31.0	21.1	3.5	1.6	0.9	0.6	0.3	0.4	0.4	26.7	8.5	9.9
Obradoiro de Socioloxía/Público	21–31 Jan 2008	4,009	33.9	25.2	3.8	–	–	–	–	–	–	–	–	8.7
Obradoiro de Socioloxía/Público	14–24 Jan 2008	4,007	35.6	27.3	3.4	–	–	–	–	–	–	–	–	8.3
CIS	14–21 Jan 2008	2,477	30.9	21.5	2.8	1.2	0.7	0.9	0.2	0.5	0.3	27.1	8.7	9.4
ASEP	14–20 Jan 2008	1,201	38.1	25.5	3.4	3.0*	2.0**	*	*	**	0.1	13.1	10.4	12.6
Metroscopia/El País	17 Jan 2008	800	34.6	26.8	3.9	–	–	–	–	–	–	16.6	11.2	7.8
Obradoiro de Socioloxía/Público	7–17 Jan 2008	4,000	35.4	29.0	3.8	–	–	–	–	–	–	–	–	6.4
Obradoiro de Socioloxía/Público	20 Nov–21 Dec 2007	9,100	32.5	24.7	3.6	–	–	–	–	–	–	–	–	7.8
ASEP	10–16 Dec 2007	1,199	35.6	21.5	3.4	3.5*	2.4**	*	*	**	0.3	17.8	10.4	14.1
Obradoiro de Socioloxía/Público	2 Dec 2007	?	31.1	23.1	3.4	–	–	–	–	–	–	–	–	8.0
Intercampo/GETS	22 Nov 2007	?	37.7	20.4	4.9	2.0	1.0	1.8	–	–	–	12.2	13.3	17.3
ASEP	12–18 Nov 2007	1,203	41.0	20.7	3.7	2.8*	2.1**	*	*	**	0.3	15.6	10.3	20.3
GESOP/El Periódico	12–17 Nov 2007	1,500	40.9	26.9	4.1	1.5	1.1	1.2	–	–	–	–	–	14.0
Obradoiro de Socioloxía/Público	4 Nov 2007	?	28.7	22.6	2.7	–	–	–	–	–	–	–	–	6.1
CIS	22–29 Oct 2007	2,493	32.5	22.4	4.0	2.1	1.4	1.1	0.2	0.6	–	18.1	11.6	10.1
ASEP	15–21 Oct 2007	1,202	37.0	22.3	3.6	2.4*	2.4**	*	*	**	0.3	14.0	13.3	14.7
DYM/ABC	1–4 Oct 2007	1,000	28.3	21.8	–	–	–	–	–	–	–	–	–	6.5
Obradoiro de Socioloxía/Público	21–28 Sep 2007	3,067	27.9	22.9	2.8	1.3	1.0	0.8	–	0.4	0.3	–	–	5.0
ASEP	17–23 Sep 2007	1,213	40.2	20.6	3.6	2.7*	2.7**	*	*	**	0.2	15.5	11.0	19.6
CIS	6–18 Jul 2007	2,483	32.8	23.0	4.9	1.4	1.1	1.0	0.6	0.6	–	16.9	12.6	9.8
ASEP	11–16 Jul 2007	1,200	38.9	21.4	3.7	3.5*	2.0**	*	*	**	–	14.0	12.4	17.5
ASEP	11–16 Jun 2007	1,202	38.4	23.5	3.5	4.3*	1.8**	*	*	**	–	12.9	10.3	14.9
GESOP/El Periódico	13–15 Jun 2007	800	41.1	27.6	4.5	1.1	1.0	1.0	–	–	–	19.0		13.5
ASEP	14–19 May 2007	1,213	36.6	22.7	3.7	3.0*	2.2**	*	*	**	–	17.1	9.6	13.9
CIS	23–29 Apr 2007	2,455	30.7	19.9	3.7	1.6	1.4	0.8	0.4	0.6	–	22.9	11.0	10.8
ASEP	16–21 Apr 2007	1,212	38.2	20.9	4.0	4.1*	2.8**	*	*	**	–	14.1	10.5	17.3
ASEP	12–17 Mar 2007	1,203	39.0	21.0	2.2	4.0*	2.8**	*	*	**	–	14.4	12.0	18.0
GESOP/El Periódico	11–15 Mar 2007	1,500	37.4	30.0	5.1	1.5	1.1	0.7	–	–	–	20.3		7.4
ASEP	12–17 Feb 2007	1,208	33.0	22.7	3.3	3.3*	2.6**	*	*	**	–	16.9	13.8	10.3
CIS	22–31 Jan 2007	2,472	29.1	19.3	4.6	1.7	1.1	0.8	0.3	0.7	–	23.3	13.4	9.8
ASEP	15–20 Jan 2007	1,201	36.1	18.7	2.7	4.2*	2.3**	*	*	**	–	16.9	15.2	17.4
Metroscopia/ABC	3 Jan 2007	605	24.5	21.2	–	–	–	–	–	–	–	–	–	3.3
ASEP	10–17 Dec 2006	1,191	34.1	20.4	3.2	4.1*	2.7**	*	*	**	–	16.7	14.2	13.7
Ipsos/PSOE	12 Dec 2006	?	39.3	32.9	–	–	–	–	–	–	–	–	–	6.4
ASEP	12–16 Nov 2006	1,206	36.6	20.2	3.3	5.0*	1.5**	*	*	**	–	14.5	14.7	16.4
CIS	18–25 Oct 2006	2,481	31.2	20.3	3.7	1.9	1.4	1.0	0.1	0.4	–	21.8	11.8	10.9
Intercampo/GETS	19 Sep–22 Oct 2006	1,735	37.5	22.5	3.6	1.4	1.1	0.8	–	–	–	13.1	12.5	15.0
Metroscopia/ABC	29 Sep–4 Oct 2006	1,000	27.2	19.2	–	–	–	–	–	–	–	–	–	8.0
ASEP	17–24 Sep 2006	1,202	34.1	22.0	3.0	2.8*	2.4**	*	*	**	–	19.8	12.7	12.1
CIS	10–16 Jul 2006	2,482	31.5	21.0	3.5	2.3	1.7	0.8	0.5	0.5	–	19.4	12.7	10.5
ASEP	3–9 Jul 2006	1,213	39.4	19.4	2.5	2.6*	3.1**	*	*	**	–	14.8	13.5	20.0
GESOP/El Periódico	30 Jun–4 Jul 2006	1,000	40.1	27.8	3.4	1.3	1.2	0.5	–	–	–	22.5		12.3
ASEP	5–11 Jun 2006	1,205	38.7	19.5	3.6	4.0*	2.5**	*	*	**	–	18.1	10.1	19.2
Metroscopia/ABC	2 Jun 2006	?	34.3	19.4	–	–	–	–	–	–	–	–	–	14.9
ASEP	8–14 May 2006	1,201	38.0	20.1	4.4	3.7*	2.1**	*	*	**	–	16.6	10.9	17.9
CIS	24–30 Apr 2006	2,481	34.4	22.9	3.7	1.5	1.2	1.0	0.3	0.6	–	19.3	9.3	11.5
GESOP/El Periódico	19–22 Apr 2006	1,002	38.8	29.8	4.4	1.2	1.6	1.6	–	–	–	19.6		9.0
ASEP	3–9 Apr 2006	1,206	38.5	22.4	2.9	4.0*	2.3**	*	*	**	–	15.6	11.9	16.1
Metroscopia/ABC	28–30 Mar 2006	1,003	35.5	19.5	–	–	–	–	–	–	–	–	–	16.0
ASEP	6–12 Mar 2006	1,200	34.4	22.1	3.3	4.2*	2.2**	*	*	**	–	18.2	11.7	12.3
ASEP	6–12 Feb 2006	1,209	32.8	24.1	3.3	3.8*	2.5**	*	*	**	–	16.8	11.7	8.7
GESOP/El Periódico	30 Jan–2 Feb 2006	1,000	37.3	30.4	4.0	2.3	1.0	1.0	–	–	–	19.5		6.9
CIS	23–29 Jan 2006	2,484	29.5	22.2	3.3	1.5	1.2	1.0	0.5	0.6	–	24.1	11.1	7.3
Metroscopia/ABC	10–17 Jan 2006	1,000	30.0	25.9	–	–	–	–	–	–	–	–	–	4.1
ASEP	9–15 Jan 2006	1,207	34.3	24.0	3.4	3.5*	1.9**	*	*	**	–	16.5	12.5	10.3
ASEP	12–18 Dec 2005	1,207	36.3	23.4	3.6	3.6*	1.7**	*	*	**	–	13.5	12.7	12.9
Celeste-Tel/Terra	21 Nov–2 Dec 2005	1,357	31.1	23.5	3.4	2.1	1.7	1.1	0.3	0.4	–	18.1	13.1	7.6
ASEP	14–20 Nov 2005	1,205	34.8	21.6	4.7	3.7*	2.2**	*	*	**	–	17.9	11.2	13.2
CIS	21–28 Oct 2005	2,489	30.0	22.3	3.2	2.0	1.4	1.0	0.2	0.4	–	24.1	11.4	7.7
ASEP	17–23 Oct 2005	1,204	35.3	20.7	3.2	4.2*	2.3**	*	*	**	–	17.8	12.1	14.6
GESOP/El Periódico	9–11 Oct 2005	1,000	36.3	32.1	5.1	2.2	1.8	1.0	–	–	–	18.1		4.2
Metroscopia/ABC	23–29 Sep 2005	1,000	28.9	24.8	4.0	–	–	–	–	–	–	23.2	9.5	4.1
ASEP	19–25 Sep 2005	1,216	37.6	20.9	3.5	3.6*	1.7**	*	*	**	–	15.7	12.7	16.7
CIS	13–21 Jul 2005	2,425	33.1	20.5	3.4	1.6	1.7	1.2	0.2	0.9	–	21.3	11.2	12.6
ASEP	4–10 Jul 2005	1,216	37.9	22.8	3.6	3.7*	1.6**	*	*	**	–	15.4	9.9	15.1
Metroscopia/ABC	1–6 Jul 2005	1,000	33.1	23.5	2.4	0.8	2.0	1.1	–	–	–	24.4	6.7	9.6
GESOP/El Periódico	27–29 Jun 2005	1,000	32.7	23.5	4.6	1.4	1.5	1.5	–	–	–	–	–	9.2
ASEP	6–12 Jun 2005	1,222	41.4	21.5	3.7	3.5*	2.1**	*	*	**	–	13.8	10.5	19.9
ASEP	9–15 May 2005	1,200	43.4	22.7	3.1	3.9*	1.6**	*	*	**	–	13.1	9.2	20.7
Metroscopia/ABC	27 Apr–5 May 2005	1,000	35.2	22.3	3.5	1.2	0.5	1.1	–	–	–	22.1	7.9	12.9
CIS	27 Apr–4 May 2005	2,477	34.9	21.8	4.3	2.1	1.0	1.2	0.4	0.7	–	18.1	10.7	13.1
GESOP/El Periódico	22–26 Apr 2005	1,003	35.5	25.6	4.8	1.5	1.4	0.8	–	–	–	27.4		9.9
ASEP	11–17 Apr 2005	1,212	38.6	21.2	3.6	2.8*	2.1**	*	*	**	–	15.9	12.5	17.4
ASEP	14–19 Mar 2005	1,203	40.8	22.6	2.6	4.1*	2.3**	*	*	**	–	14.2	10.7	18.2
ASEP	14–19 Feb 2005	1,203	42.1	21.6	3.7	3.8*	2.2**	*	*	**	–	14.8	9.1	20.5
CIS	19–24 Jan 2005	2,495	36.5	21.2	3.6	1.7	1.1	1.0	0.5	0.4	–	20.6	8.9	15.3
GESOP/El Periódico	19–22 Jan 2005	1,500	37.4	23.1	5.0	1.1	1.1	1.0	–	–	–	17.3	7.8	14.3
ASEP	17–22 Jan 2005	1,212	44.1	21.9	3.2	3.6*	2.4**	*	*	**	–	12.5	9.4	22.2
Metroscopia/ABC	14–16 Dec 2004	1,302	27.6	20.8	–	–	–	–	–	–	–	–	–	6.8
ASEP	15 Dec 2004	1,212	36.7	19.9	4.4	5.7*	2.4**	*	*	**	–	16.1	10.3	16.8
ASEP	15–20 Nov 2004	1,206	41.8	21.3	3.9	3.4*	2.8**	*	*	**	–	14.9	9.6	20.5
CIS	21–26 Oct 2004	2,494	35.5	20.7	4.0	1.9	1.6	0.8	0.3	0.7	–	21.5	9.0	14.8
Gallup	1–21 Oct 2004	2,027	36.3	18.3	4.1	1.6	1.2	0.8	–	–	–	19.4	15.8	18.0
ASEP	15 Oct 2004	1,212	41.9	20.7	3.7	4.7*	1.8**	*	*	**	–	14.8	8.2	21.2
Metroscopia/ABC	3 Oct 2004	803	33.7	18.9	–	–	–	–	–	–	–	–	–	14.8
GESOP/El Periódico	22–24 Sep 2004	1,500	36.0	26.3	4.3	1.4	0.9	–	–	–	–	15.8	7.5	9.7
Gallup	1–21 Sep 2004	2,001	35.9	17.9	2.3	0.9	0.6	0.4	–	–	–	23.3	15.9	18.0
ASEP	15 Sep 2004	1,212	41.6	22.3	2.8	3.8*	2.8**	*	*	**	–	15.0	8.8	19.3
Gallup	1–26 Aug 2004	2,019	37.6	19.3	2.7	0.7	0.6	0.5	–	–	–	19.8	15.2	18.3
Gallup	1–21 Jul 2004	2,019	38.7	17.1	3.8	0.8	0.5	0.7	–	–	–	19.8	15.4	21.6
CIS	9–16 Jul 2004	2,487	39.2	19.5	3.3	1.4	1.6	1.0	0.4	0.5	–	20.0	9.1	19.7
ASEP	15 Jul 2004	1,212	44.6	20.3	3.9	3.2*	2.4**	*	*	**	–	14.8	7.5	24.3
Gallup	2–23 Jun 2004	2,024	35.2	19.9	3.4	1.1	0.9	1.0	–	–	–	22.8	13.6	15.3
ASEP	15 Jun 2004	1,212	43.3	21.9	3.8	5.2*	2.2**	*	*	**	–	12.4	8.2	21.4
2004 EP election	13 Jun 2004	—N/a	19.7	18.8	1.9	1.1	0.8	0.7	0.2	0.4	–	—N/a	54.1	0.9
Gallup	3–21 May 2004	2,021	43.3	17.4	4.0	1.0	0.9	1.1	–	–	–	18.5	11.8	25.9
ASEP	15 May 2004	1,212	48.0	18.9	3.1	5.1*	1.9**	*	*	**	–	13.9	6.7	29.1
CIS	22–27 Apr 2004	2,493	44.4	20.4	4.2	1.6	1.9	0.8	0.3	0.7	–	16.5	6.0	24.0
Gallup	1–21 Apr 2004	2,019	34.8	20.8	3.4	1.0	0.5	2.2	–	–	–	22.0	12.6	14.0
TNS Demoscopia/ABC	17 Apr 2004	600	35.8	16.8	2.7	1.0	1.7	0.8	0.2	0.7	–	30.3	7.0	19.0
ASEP	15 Apr 2004	1,212	41.8	22.2	4.4	4.8*	4.3**	*	*	**	–	13.9	6.3	19.6
Vox Pública/El Periódico	13–15 Apr 2004	1,501	38.9	26.2	3.9	1.9	–	0.9	–	–	–	11.2	8.5	12.7
ASEP	15–20 Mar 2004	1,212	42.7	24.2	4.6	5.5*	3.6**	*	*	**	–	11.1	5.2	18.5
2004 general election	14 Mar 2004	—N/a	32.7	28.8	3.8	2.5	1.9	1.2	0.7	0.6	–	—N/a	22.7	3.9
(*) Includes data for CiU, PNV, EA, CG, PA, UPN, UV and CC. (**) Includes data for ERC, BNG, ICV, CHA and NaBai.

==== Victory preference ====
The table below lists opinion polling on the victory preferences for each party in the event of a general election taking place.

Color key:

Poll conducted after legal ban on opinion polls

Polling firm/Commissioner	Fieldwork date	Sample size	PSOE	PP	IU	CiU	ERC	PNV	Other/ None	Question	Lead
Sigma Dos/The Times	5 Mar 2008	1,000	42.8	33.4	4.3	–	–	–	3.2	16.3	9.4
Noxa/La Vanguardia	26–29 Feb 2008	1,200	51.0	35.0	3.0	1.0	1.0	–	5.0	4.0	16.0
Metroscopia/El País	8–27 Feb 2008	8,750	53.0	33.0	–	–	–	–	–	–	20.0
Metroscopia/El País	22 Feb 2008	600	54.0	31.0	–	–	–	–	–	–	23.0
Metroscopia/El País	15 Feb 2008	600	51.0	32.0	–	–	–	–	–	–	19.0
Noxa/La Vanguardia	8–14 Feb 2008	1,800	47.0	35.0	4.0	1.0	1.0	–	6.0	6.0	12.0
Metroscopia/El País	8 Feb 2008	600	51.0	32.0	–	–	–	–	–	–	19.0
CIS	21 Jan–4 Feb 2008	18,221	40.0	25.3	3.4	1.2	0.6	0.4	2.8	26.3	14.7
Metroscopia/El País	26–30 Jan 2008	2,000	54.0	33.0	–	–	–	–	–	–	21.0
Noxa/La Vanguardia	11–16 Jan 2008	1,000	47.0	37.0	4.0	1.0	1.0	1.0	3.0	6.0	10.0
Ipsos/Expansión	14–16 Dec 2007	1,000	47.0	35.0	–	–	–	–	–	–	12.0
Noxa/La Vanguardia	28 Nov–12 Dec 2007	2,000	47.0	34.0	5.0	1.0	–	1.0	7.0	5.0	13.0
Noxa/La Vanguardia	28 Sep–3 Oct 2007	1,000	44.0	36.0	–	–	–	–	–	–	8.0
Ipsos/Expansión	1–3 Jun 2007	?	41.0	37.0 (Note: With Alberto Ruiz-Gallardón within PP's Congress lists.)	–	–	–	–	–	–	4.0
Ipsos/Expansión	1–3 Jun 2007	?	39.0	35.0	–	–	–	–	–	–	4.0
Noxa/La Vanguardia	15–18 Jan 2007	1,000	44.0	30.0	–	–	–	–	–	–	14.0
Noxa/La Vanguardia	10–13 Jul 2006	1,000	46.0	34.0	–	–	–	–	–	–	12.0
Noxa/La Vanguardia	4–7 Jul 2005	1,000	45.0	32.0	4.0	1.0	1.0	1.0	–	–	13.0
Noxa/La Vanguardia	7–10 Feb 2005	1,000	49.0	31.0	4.0	1.0	2.0	1.0	–	–	18.0

==== Victory likelihood ====
The table below lists opinion polling on the perceived likelihood of victory for each party in the event of a general election taking place.

Color key:

Poll conducted after legal ban on opinion polls

Polling firm/Commissioner	Fieldwork date	Sample size	PSOE	PP	Other/ None	Question	Lead
Sigma Dos/The Times	5 Mar 2008	1,000	68.9	13.7	–	17.4	55.2
Noxa/La Vanguardia	26–29 Feb 2008	1,200	68.0	16.0	1.0	15.0	52.0
Metroscopia/El País	8–27 Feb 2008	8,750	60.0	16.0	24.0		44.0
ASEP	11–17 Feb 2008	1,200	56.0	20.6	–	23.6	35.4
Metroscopia/El País	15 Feb 2008	600	62.0	13.0	25.0		49.0
Noxa/La Vanguardia	8–14 Feb 2008	1,800	63.0	19.0	1.0	17.0	44.0
Metroscopia/El País	8 Feb 2008	600	55.0	17.0	28.0		38.0
CIS	21 Jan–4 Feb 2008	18,221	52.4	15.3	2.8	29.6	37.1
Metroscopia/El País	26–30 Jan 2008	2,000	60.0	18.0	22.0		42.0
ASEP	14–20 Jan 2008	1,201	57.9	21.7	–	20.5	36.2
Noxa/La Vanguardia	11–16 Jan 2008	1,000	55.0	23.0	2.0	20.0	32.0
Ipsos/Expansión	11–13 Jan 2008	?	40.0	38.0	–	–	2.0
Ipsos/Expansión	14–16 Dec 2007	?	54.0	27.0	–	–	27.0
Noxa/La Vanguardia	28 Nov–12 Dec 2007	2,000	59.0	23.0	1.0	17.0	36.0
Sigma Dos/El Mundo	28–31 Aug 2007	800	54.2	25.5	–	20.3	28.7
Ipsos/Expansión	1–3 Jun 2007	?	32.0	48.0	–	–	16.0
Ipsos/Expansión	1–3 Jun 2007	?	42.0	35.0	–	–	7.0
Metroscopia/ABC	28–30 Mar 2006	1,003	64.0	18.0	18.0		46.0
