= Lourdes Goicoechea =

Navarrese politician

First Vice President of Navarre
- In office 23 June 2012 – 23 July 2015
- President: Yolanda Barcina
- Preceded by: Roberto Jiménez
- Succeeded by: Manu Ayerdi

Minister of Economy, Finance, Industry and Employment of Navarre
- In office 23 June 2012 – 23 July 2015
- President: Yolanda Barcina
- Preceded by: Álvaro Miranda; Herself
- Succeeded by: Manu Ayerdi; Mikel Aranburu

Minister of Rural Development, Industry, Employment and Environment of Navarre
- In office 2 July 2011 – 23 June 2012
- President: Yolanda Barcina
- Preceded by: Begoña Sanzberro
- Succeeded by: Herself; Javier Esparza

Personal details
- Born: Lourdes Goicoechea Zubelzu; 1960 (age 65–66) Tolosa, Spain
- Party: Navarrese People's Union

Lourdes Goicoechea Zubelzu (born 1960) is a Navarrese politician, who served as First Vice President and Minister of Economy, Finance, Industry and Employment of Navarre from 2012 to 2015, as well as regional Minister of Rural Development, Industry, Employment and Environment from 2011 to 2012.
