= Álvaro Miranda Simavilla =

Spanish politician (born 1957)

Álvaro Miranda

Second Vice President of Navarre
- In office 17 August 2007 – 23 June 2012
- President: Miguel Sanz; Yolanda Barcina
- Preceded by: Office established
- Succeeded by: Juan Luis Sánchez de Muniáin

Minister of Economy and Finance of Navarre
- In office 17 August 2007 – 23 June 2012
- President: Miguel Sanz; Yolanda Barcina
- Preceded by: Francisco Iribarren
- Succeeded by: Lourdes Goicoechea

Personal details
- Born: Álvaro Miranda Simavilla; 1957 (age 68–69) Zaragoza, Spain
- Party: Navarrese People's Union

Álvaro Miranda Simavilla (born 1957) is a Navarrese politician, who served as Second Vice President and Minister of the Presidency and Equality of Navarre from 2007 to 2012.
