= José Luis Mendoza Peña =

Spanish politician (born 1954)

José Luis Mendoza

Minister of Education of Navarre
- In office 23 July 2015 – 12 April 2017
- President: Uxue Barkos
- Preceded by: José Iribas
- Succeeded by: María Solana

Personal details
- Born: José Luis Mendoza Peña; 1954 (age 71–72) Cárcar, Navarre
- Party: Independent
- Other political affiliations: Zabaltzen

José Luis Mendoza Peña (born 1954) is a Navarrese politician, Minister of Education of Navarre from July 2015 to April 2017.
