= Ana Ollo =

Navarrese politician

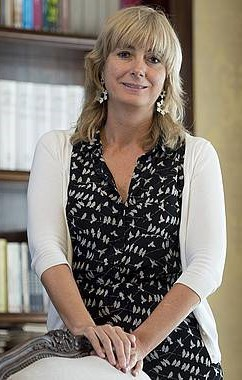

Second Vice President of Navarre
- Incumbent
- Assumed office 18 August 2023
- Preceded by: José María Aierdi

Minister of Citizen Relations of Navarre
- Incumbent
- Assumed office 23 July 2015
- President: Uxue Barkos; María Chivite
- Preceded by: Office established

Spokesperson of the Government of Navarre
- In office 23 July 2015 – 8 September 2016
- President: Uxue Barkos
- Preceded by: Juan Luis Sánchez de Muniáin
- Succeeded by: María Solana

Personal details
- Born: Ana Ollo Hualde; 24 January 1965 (age 61) Pamplona, Navarre
- Party: Basque Nationalist Party
- Other political affiliations: Geroa Bai

Ana Ollo Hualde (born 24 January 1965) is a Navarrese politician, Minister of Citizen Relations of Navarre since July 2015 and Spokesperson of the Government of Navarre from July 2015 to September 2016.
