= María Solana =

Spanish politician (born 1975)

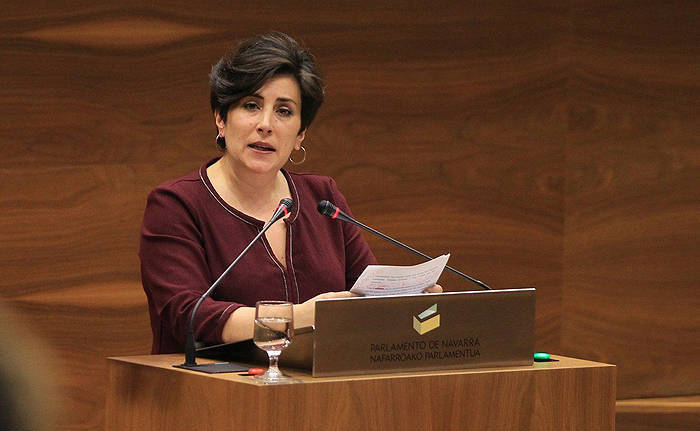

Minister of Education of Navarre
- In office 12 April 2017 – 7 August 2019
- President: Uxue Barkos
- Preceded by: José Luis Mendoza
- Succeeded by: Carlos Gimeno

Spokesperson of the Government of Navarre
- In office 8 September 2016 – 7 August 2019
- President: Uxue Barkos
- Preceded by: Ana Ollo
- Succeeded by: Javier Remírez

Personal details
- Born: María Roncesvalles Solana Arana; 5 October 1975 (age 51) Pamplona, Navarre
- Other political affiliations: Basque Nationalist Party

María Roncesvalles Solana Arana (born 5 October 1975) is a Navarrese politician, Minister of Education of Navarre from April 2017 to August 2019 and Spokesperson of the Government of Navarre from September 2016 to August 2019.
