= Alberto Catalán =

Spanish politician (born 1962)

Alberto Prudencio Catalán Higueras (born 7 November 1962) is a Spanish politician of the Navarrese People's Union (UPN).

He was a minister of the Government of Navarre from 2003 to 2011, and the president of the Parliament of Navarre from 2011 to 2015. He served two terms in the Senate of Spain from 2019 to 2023, and was then elected to the Congress of Deputies.

== Biography ==
Born in Corella in Navarre, Catalán graduated in pharmacy from the University of Navarra.

Catalán was voted secretary general of the Navarrese People's Union (UPN) in 2001, and its vice president in 2009. In 2003 he was named to the Government of Navarre as minister of local administration and spokesperson of the executive. In August 2007 he was named minister of institutional relations and government spokesman, and in September 2009 he was also put in charge of the Department of Education.

On 15 June 2011, Catalán was elected president of the Parliament of Navarre, the role of speaker. This was facilitated by an agreement between his party, the People's Party of Navarre (PPN) and the Socialist Party of Navarre (PSN), with the latter getting the vice presidency as a result.

In March 2013, Catalán contested the party presidency against incumbent Yolanda Barcina, President of the Government of Navarre, who was involved in a scandal in which several officeholders received payments for attending brief meetings of Caja Navarra. She won by 871 votes to 795, and he lost his office as vice president.

For the April 2019 Spanish general election, Catalán was third for the Senate of Spain in the Navarre constituency, on the list of Navarra Suma, a coalition with Citizens and the People's Party (PP). He was elected, as the second most voted candidate. The result was repeated in the November election.

Ahead of the 2023 Spanish general election, Catalán was named the lead UPN candidate in the Navarre constituency for the Congress of Deputies. He was elected as his party took one of the five seats.
