= Ana Herrera Isasi =

Spanish politician and journalist (born 1966)

Ana Herrera
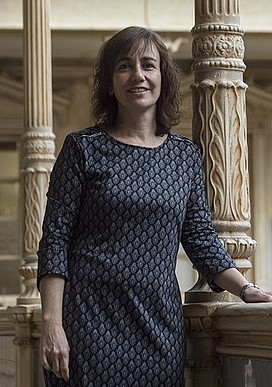
- Ana Herrera

Minister of Culture, Sports and Youth of Navarre
- In office 23 July 2015 – 7 August 2019
- President: Uxue Barkos
- Preceded by: Juan Luis Sánchez de Muniáin
- Succeeded by: Rebeca Esnaola

Personal details
- Born: Ana Julia Herrera Isasi; 1966 (age 59–60) Pamplona, Navarre, Spain
- Party: Independent

Ana Julia Herrera Isasi (born 1966) is a Navarrese politician, Minister of Culture, Sports and Youth of Navarre from July 2015 to August 2019.
