= Rosario Isasi =

Rosario Isasi is a health and human rights attorney, whose research and work focuses on the regulation of human genetic technologies.

== Early life and career ==
Isasi holds a J.D. from the Pontifical Catholic University of Peru (1992) and a Master of Public Health from Boston University School of Public Health (2002).

Isasi is currently a postdoctoral fellow at the Centre de Recherche en Droit Public, at the Université de Montréal, and an affiliated scholar with the Institute on Biotechnology and the Human Future. She has particular expertise in the area of comparative legal and ethical research regarding cloning and stem cell research. She is the Academic Secretary of the International Stem Cell Forum Ethics Working Party, an affiliated scholar of the Center for Genetics and Society in Oakland, California and the Institute on Biotechnology and the Human Future, Chicago-Kent College of Law, in Chicago, Illinois. She is also a member of the Advisory Board of Global Lawyers and Physicians, a transnational professional association of lawyers and physicians working together to promote human rights and health.

== See also ==
- Bioethics
- Biopolitics
- Eugenics Wars argument

== External links and references ==
- Human Future Scholar: Rosario Isasi
- HumGen:Our Team Rosario Isasi
- One and only: Post-doctoral fellow Rosario Isasi advocates ban on reproductive cloning
- Annas, G.J., Andrews, L.B. and Isasi, R.M., "Protecting the Endangered Human: Toward an International Treaty Prohibiting Cloning and Inheritable Alterations," American Journal of Law and Medicine 2002; 28: 151–78.
- George J. Annas, American Bioethics: Crossing Human Rights and Health Law Boundaries Oxford and New York: Oxford University Press, 2005.
