= Miguel Laparra =

Spanish politician

Miguel Laparra Navarro (born 1962 in Cher, France) is a Spanish politician and sociologist. He is a doctor in sociology. As of July 2015, he was named Vice President of the Government of Navarra as well as counsellor for Social Policy, Employment and Housing in the government. He was named by the left-wing coalition Izquierda-Ezkerra as its representative in the government.

Before assuming his role in the Navarra cabinet, he headed the Cátedra de Investigación para la Igualdad y la Integración Social (CIPRAIIS) at Universidad Pública de Navarra (UPNA). He served as research fellow at the Warwick Institute of Employment Research and as lecturer at Niederhein University of Applied Sciences. He was named as Director of the Department of Social Work of UPNA in 2007.
