= Roberto Jiménez Alli =

Spanish politician (born 1973)

Roberto Jiménez

Secretary-General of the Socialist Party of Navarre
- In office 28 June 2008 – 13 December 2014
- Preceded by: Carlos Chivite
- Succeeded by: María Chivite

First Vice President of Navarre
- In office 2 July 2011 – 16 June 2012
- President: Yolanda Barcina
- Preceded by: Javier Caballero
- Succeeded by: Lourdes Goicoechea

Minister of the Presidency, Public Administrations and Interior of Navarre
- In office 2 July 2011 – 16 June 2012
- President: Yolanda Barcina
- Preceded by: Javier Caballero
- Succeeded by: Javier Morrás

Personal details
- Born: Roberto Jiménez Alli; 28 September 1973 (age 53) Pitillas, Spain
- Party: Socialist Party of Navarre

Roberto Jiménez Alli (born 28 September 1973) is a Navarrese politician, who served as First Vice President and Minister of the Presidency, Public Administrations and Interior from 2011 to 2012, and secretary-general of the Socialist Party of Navarre from 2008 to 2014.
