= Mikel Aranburu Urtasun =

Spanish politician, auditor

Mikel Aranburu

Minister of Finance and Financial Policy of Navarre
- In office 23 July 2015 – 7 August 2019
- President: Uxue Barkos
- Preceded by: Lourdes Goicoechea
- Succeeded by: Elma Saiz

Personal details
- Born: Mikel Aranburu Urtasun; 29 October 1955 (age 70) Pamplona, Navarre
- Party: Independent
- Other political affiliations: Zabaltzen

Mikel Aranburu Urtasun (born 29 October 1955) is a Navarrese politician, Minister of Finance and Financial Policy of Navarre from July 2015 to August 2019.
