= Yolanda Barcina =

Spanish politician (born 1960)

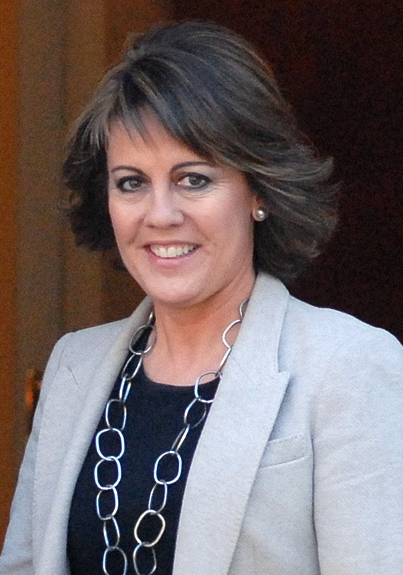

8th President of the Government of Navarre
- In office 23 June 2011 – 20 July 2015
- Monarchs: Juan Carlos I Felipe VI
- Preceded by: Miguel Sanz
- Succeeded by: Uxue Barkos

Mayor of Pamplona
- In office 4 July 1999 – 11 June 2011
- Preceded by: Javier Chourraut
- Succeeded by: Enrique Maya

Minister of the Environment, Territorial Planning and Housing of Navarre
- In office 19 September 1996 – 4 July 1999
- President: Miguel Sanz
- Preceded by: Javier del Castillo
- Succeeded by: Javier Marcotegui

Personal details
- Born: Yolanda Barcina Angulo; 4 April 1960 (age 66) Burgos, Castile and León, Spain
- Party: Navarrese People's Union
- Spouse(s): José Virgilio Vallejo (m. 1989; div. 2010) Manuel Pizarro Moreno (m. 2016)
- Children: 1

Yolanda Barcina Angulo (born 4 April 1960) is a conservative Spanish politician who was the mayor of Pamplona, Navarre from 1999 to 2011, and elected the chairwoman of the Navarrese People's Union (UPN) in 2009. From 2011 to 2015, she was the President of the Chartered Community of Navarre.

== Biography ==
=== Early years ===
Barcina's parents settled in Navarre when she was 17 and she studied pharmacy at the University of Navarre. Barcina worked as a professor at various Spanish universities including the Public University of Navarre, where she served as the vice-rector from 1995 to 1996.

=== Political career ===
Barcina was elected the mayor (alcaldesa) of Pamplona in 1999 and the vice-president of the UPN in 2003. In 2009, she took the position of Miguel Sanz in the party, before winning the elections for President of Navarre.

In 2001, Barcina had a debate with actress Penélope Cruz about the San Fermín running of the bulls. She has distinguished herself for her hard-line approach on Basque nationalism, and a rigid stance on environmental issues, favouring controversial engineering projects like the construction of the Itoiz Reservoir, the high speed train (in the offing) and the trans-Pyrenean motorway (in the offing). On this account, Barcina was subjected to a pie smash on the face at a meeting in Toulouse.

Barcina held office in Navarre on a Regionalist ticket (UPN) from 2011 to 2015, initially with Socialist support. After regional elections, a multiparty coalition spearheaded by Uxue Barkos (Geroa Bai) removed Barcina from regional office in July 2015.

=== Later activities ===
Barcina in turn announced a return to her former lecturer position at the Public University of Navarre, UPNA, refusing to benefit from any privileged position that may be related to her time in office ("no revolving doors", August 2015). In October 2015, it was disclosed that she would sign up for a section of Spanish telecommunications corporate Movistar, as a member of its board of directors, and an initial annual salary of 200,000 euros on top of a reduced shift at the UPNA.
