= 2027 Navarrese regional election =

Election in the Spanish region of Navarre

- 23 May 2027

All 50 seats in the Parliament of Navarre 26 seats needed for a majority
- Opinion polls

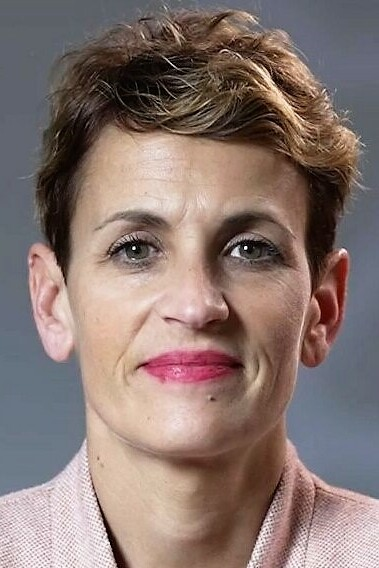

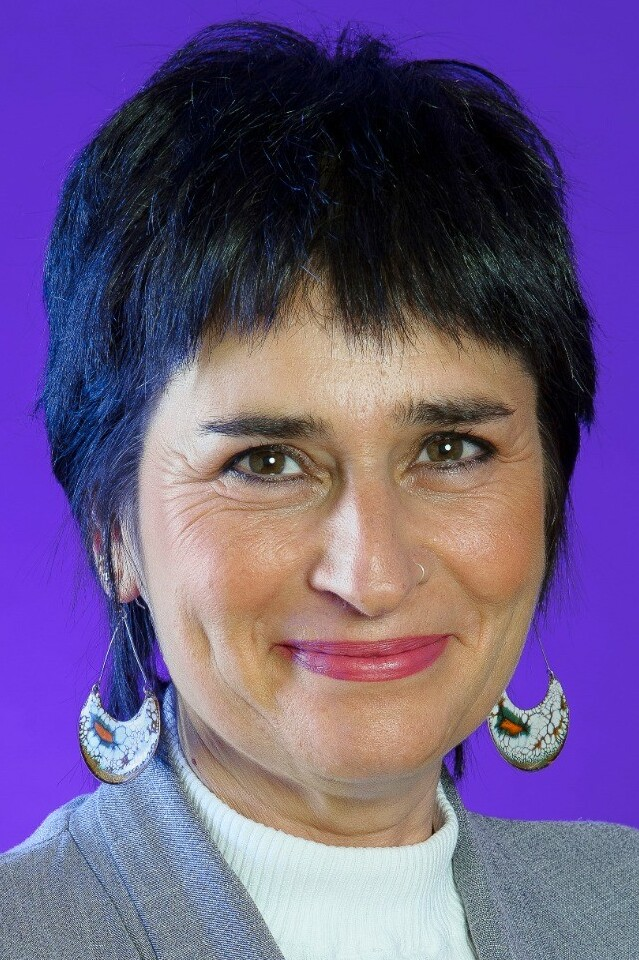

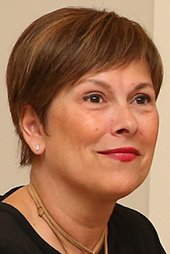

Leader	Cristina Ibarrola	María Chivite	Laura Aznal
Party	UPN	PSN–PSOE	EH Bildu
Leader since	28 April 2024	19 October 2014	6 May 2022
Last election	15 seats, 28.0%	11 seats, 20.7%	9 seats, 17.1%
Current seats	15	11	9
Seats needed	▲11	▲15	▲17
Leader	Uxue Barkos	TBD	Neniques Roldán
Party	GBai	PP	Contigo/Zurekin
Leader since	3 October 2014	—	28 June 2025
Last election	7 seats, 13.2%	3 seats, 7.3%	3 seats, 6.1%
Current seats	7	3	3
Seats needed	▲19	▲23	▲23
Incumbent President
María Chivite
PSN–PSOE

A regional election will be held in Navarre on 23 May 2027 to elect the 12th Parliament of the chartered community. All 50 seats in the Parliament will be up for election. It will be held concurrently with regional elections in at least six other autonomous communities and local elections all across Spain.

== Overview ==
Under the 1982 Reintegration and Improvement of the Chartered Regime, the Parliament of Navarre is the unicameral legislature of the homonymous chartered community, having legislative power in devolved matters, as well as the ability to grant or withdraw confidence from a regional president. The electoral and procedural rules were supplemented by national law provisions.

=== Date ===
The term of the Parliament of Navarre expires four years after the date of its previous election, unless it is dissolved earlier. If no snap election is called before the last year of the legislative term, the election decree shall be issued no later than 54 days before the scheduled election date and published on the following day in the Official Gazette of Navarre (BON), with election day taking place on the fourth Sunday of May four years after the previous election. The previous election was held on 28 May 2023, setting the latest possible date for election day on the fourth Sunday of May four years later, which is 23 May 2027.

The regional president has the prerogative to dissolve the Parliament of Navarre at any given time and call a snap election, provided that no motion of no confidence is in process, no nationwide election is due and some time requirements are met: namely, that dissolution does not occur either during the first legislative session or during the last year of parliament before its planned expiration, nor before one year after a previous one under this procedure. In the event of an investiture process failing to elect a regional president within a three-month period from election day, the Parliament shall be automatically dissolved and a fresh election called.

=== Electoral system ===
Voting for the Parliament is based on universal suffrage, comprising all Spanish nationals over 18 years of age, registered in Navarre and with full political rights, provided that they have not been deprived of the right to vote by a final sentence.

The Parliament of Navarre has a minimum of 40 and a maximum of 60 seats, with electoral provisions fixing its size at 50. All are elected in a single multi-member constituency—corresponding to the chartered community's territory—using the D'Hondt method and closed-list proportional voting, with a three percent-threshold of valid votes (including blank ballots) regionally.

The law does not provide for by-elections to fill vacant seats; instead, any vacancies arising after the proclamation of candidates and during the legislative term will be filled by the next candidates on the party lists or, when required, by designated substitutes.

=== Current parliament ===
The table below shows the composition of the parliamentary groups in the chamber at the present time.

Current parliamentary composition
Groups	Parties	Legislators	
Groups	Parties	Seats	Total
Navarrese People's Union Parliamentary Group	UPN	15	15
Socialist Party of Navarre Parliamentary Group	PSN–PSOE	11	11
EH Bildu Navarre Parliamentary Group	Sortu	9	9
Yes to the Future Parliamentary Group	GSB/GSV	3	7
Yes to the Future Parliamentary Group	EAJ/PNV	3	7
Yes to the Future Parliamentary Group	AT	1	7
People's Party of Navarre Parliamentary Group	PP	3	3
Navarre With You Parliamentary Group	Podemos	2	3
Navarre With You Parliamentary Group	IUN/NEB	1	3
Mixed Group	Vox	1	1
Non-Inscrits	INDEP	1 (Note: Maite Nosti, former Vox legislator.)	1

== Parties and candidates ==
The electoral law allows for parties and federations registered in the interior ministry, alliances and groupings of electors to present lists of candidates. Parties and federations intending to form an alliance are required to inform the relevant electoral commission within 10 days of the election call, whereas groupings of electors need to secure the signature of at least one percent of the electorate in Navarre, disallowing electors from signing for more than one list. Amendments in 2024 required a balanced composition of men and women in the electoral lists through the use of a zipper system.

Below is a list of the main parties and alliances which will likely contest the election:

Candidacy	Parties and alliances	Leading candidate	Ideology	Previous result		Gov.	Ref.
Candidacy	Parties and alliances	Leading candidate	Ideology	Vote %	Seats	Gov.	Ref.
UPN	List: Navarrese People's Union (UPN)	Cristina Ibarrola	Conservatism; Christian democracy Regionalism	28.0%	15	No	
PSN–PSOE	List: Socialist Party of Navarre (PSN–PSOE)	María Chivite	Social democracy	20.7%	11	Yes	
EH Bildu	List: Basque Country Gather (EH Bildu) – Create (Sortu) – Basque Solidarity (EA) – Alternative (Alternatiba)	Laura Aznal	Basque independence Abertzale left Socialism	17.1%	9	No	
GBai	List: Future Social Greens (GSB/GSV); Basque Nationalist Party (EAJ/PNV); Villava Group (AT)	Uxue Barkos	Basque nationalism Social democracy	13.2%	7	Yes	
PP	List: People's Party (PP)	TBD	Conservatism; Christian democracy	7.3%	3	No	
Contigo/ Zurekin	List: We Can (Podemos); United Left of Navarre (IUN/NEB) – Communist Party of the Basque Country (PCE/EPK) – The Dawn Marxist Organization (La Aurora (OM)) – Republican Left (IR); Assembly (Batzarre); Green Alliance (AV); Greens Equo (Verdes Equo)	Neniques Roldán	Left-wing populism Direct democracy Democratic socialism	6.1%	3	Yes	
Vox	List: Vox (Vox)	Emilio Jiménez	Right-wing populism Ultranationalism; National conservatism	4.3%	2	No	

== Opinion polls ==
The tables below list opinion polling results in reverse chronological order, showing the most recent first and using the dates when the survey fieldwork was done, as opposed to the date of publication. Where the fieldwork dates are unknown, the date of publication is given instead. The highest percentage figure in each polling survey is displayed with its background shaded in the leading party's colour. If a tie ensues, this is applied to the figures with the highest percentages. The "Lead" column on the right shows the percentage-point difference between the parties with the highest percentages in a poll.

=== Graphical summary ===
Local regression trend line of poll results from 28 May 2023 to the present day, with each line corresponding to a political party.

=== Voting intention estimates ===
The table below lists weighted voting intention estimates. Refusals are generally excluded from the party vote percentages, while question wording and the treatment of "don't know" responses and those not intending to vote may vary between polling organisations. When available, seat projections determined by the polling organisations are displayed below (or in place of) the percentages in a smaller font; 26 seats were required for an absolute majority in the Parliament of Navarre.

Polling firm/Commissioner	Fieldwork date	Sample size	Turnout	UPN	PSN–PSOE	EH Bildu	GBai	PP	C/Z	Vox	CS	Podemos	Sumar	SALF	Lead
EM-Analytics/Electomanía	30 Sep–29 Oct 2026	1,245	?	29.2; 16	21.7; 12	20.6; 11	6.6; 3	8.8; 4	–	4.5; 2	–	4.2; 2	2.1; 0	–	7.5
Sigma Dos/El Mundo	18–21 May 2026	1,087	?	27.2; 15	18.4; 10	17.9; 10	10.1; 5	7.5; 4	6.5; 3	6.1; 3	–	(Note: Within C/ZN.)	–	–	8.8
Gizaker/EiTB	17 Apr–13 May 2026	600	?	26.2; 14	20.5; 10	19.9; 10	13.0; 6	7.5; 4	5.6; 3	6.7; 3	–		–	–	5.7
Aztiker/EH Bildu	24 Dec 2025	993	?	24.6; 13	? 11	18.8; 10	? 6	? 4	? 2	7.7; 4	–		–	–	?
Sigma Dos/El Mundo	24 Nov–1 Dec 2025	1,021	?	27.5; 14/15	17.5; 9/10	20.5; 10/11	10.2; 5	7.6; 3/4	6.3; 3	7.0; 3/4	–		–	–	7.0
EM-Analytics/Electomanía	28 May–27 Jun 2025	1,245	?	30.5; 17	23.8; 13	20.8; 11	6.4; 3	10.0; 5	–	2.2; 0	0.0; 0	2.9; 0	3.0; 1	–	6.7
NC Report/La Razón	16–31 May 2025	300	62.1	? 15	? 9	? 10	? 6	? 5	? 3	? 2	–		–	–	?
Sigma Dos/El Mundo	16–29 Apr 2025	1,084	?	28.6; 15	24.2; 12/13	20.3; 10/11	7.0; 3/4	7.5; 4	5.5; 2/3	4.4; 2	–		–	–	4.4
Sigma Dos/CoCiudadana	10–17 Jan 2025	679	?	29.1; 15/16	23.8; 12/13	19.8; 10/11	8.1; 3/4	7.3; 3/4	5.6; 2/3	4.8; 2	–		–	–	5.3
2024 EP election	9 Jun 2024	—N/a	50.0	–	28.8 (16)	18.7 (10)	3.2 (1)	28.0 (16)	–	6.7 (3)	0.5 (0)	3.2 (1)	3.9 (2)	3.1 (1)	0.8
EM-Analytics/Electomanía	30 Apr–27 May 2024	1,245	?	30.2; 16	22.4; 12	17.7; 9	8.7; 4	10.7; 5	–	3.8; 2	0.4; 0	1.5; 0	3.8; 2	–	7.8
CIES/UPN	9–17 Apr 2024	1,000	?	31.8; 17	18.7; 10	20.9; 11	11.5; 6	5.5; 2	5.3; 2	5.1; 2	–		–	–	10.9
2023 general election	23 Jul 2023	—N/a	66.4	15.3 (8)	27.4 (14)	17.2 (9)	2.9 (0)	16.7 (9)	(Note: Within Sumar.)	5.7 (3)	–		12.8 (7)	–	10.2
2023 regional election	28 May 2023	—N/a	64.4	28.0; 15	20.7; 11	17.1; 9	13.2; 7	7.3; 3	6.1; 3	4.3; 2	0.4; 0		–	–	7.3

=== Voting preferences ===
The table below lists raw, unweighted voting preferences.

Polling firm/Commissioner	Fieldwork date	Sample size	UPN	PSN–PSOE	EH Bildu	GBai	PP	C/Z	Vox	Podemos	Sumar	SALF	Question	X mark	Lead
CIS	7–31 Mar 2025	456	17.3	21.6	12.9	3.6	8.2	–	4.1	1.5	1.0	0.2	21.1	4.4	4.3
2024 EP election (Note: Does not include non-resident citizens.)	9 Jun 2024	—N/a	–	15.2	9.9	1.7	14.7		3.5	1.7	2.0	1.6	—N/a	47.1	0.5
2023 general election	23 Jul 2023	—N/a	10.6	19.0	12.0	2.0	11.5		3.9		8.9	–	—N/a	30.1	7.0
2023 regional election	28 May 2023	—N/a	18.7	13.8	11.5	8.9	4.8	4.1	2.9		–	–	—N/a	32.2	4.9

=== Preferred President ===
The table below lists opinion polling on leader preferences to become president of the Government of Navarre.

Polling firm/Commissioner	Fieldwork date	Sample size								Other/ None/ Not care	Question	Lead
Polling firm/Commissioner	Fieldwork date	Sample size	Esparza UPN	Ibarrola UPN	Chivite PSN	Aznal EH Bildu	Barkos GBai	García PP	Nosti Vox	Other/ None/ Not care	Question	Lead
CIS (Note: Responses denoting a party's generic candidate are aggregated to that party's main candidate/leader at the time of the poll.)	7–31 Mar 2025	456	6.1	7.3	22.1	6.8	1.3	4.8	1.6	6.1	43.4	14.8

== Bibliography ==
- Ley Orgánica 13/1982, de 10 de agosto, de reintegración y amejoramiento del Régimen Foral de Navarra (Organic Law 13/1982). Official State Gazette (in Spanish). 10 August 1982 [version as of 6 December 2024]. BOE-A-1982-20824.
- Ley Orgánica 5/1985, de 19 de junio, del Régimen Electoral General (Organic Law 5/1985). Official State Gazette (in Spanish). 19 June 1985 [version as of 2 July 2026]. BOE-A-1985-11672.
- Ley Foral 16/1986, de 17 de noviembre, reguladora de las elecciones al Parlamento de Navarra (Foral Law 16/1986). Official State Gazette (in Spanish). 17 November 1986 [version as of 11 June 2004]. BOE-A-1987-1255.
- Ley Foral 14/2004, de 3 de diciembre, del Gobierno de Navarra y de su Presidente (Foral Law 14/2004). Official State Gazette (in Spanish). 3 December 2004 [version as of 20 May 2021]. BOE-A-2005-1576.
