= 2023 Navarrese regional election =

Election in the Spanish region of Navarre

- 28 May 2023

All 50 seats in the Parliament of Navarre 26 seats needed for a majority
- Opinion polls
- Registered: 518,998 ▲1.6%
- Turnout: 334,493 (64.4%) ▼4.1 pp
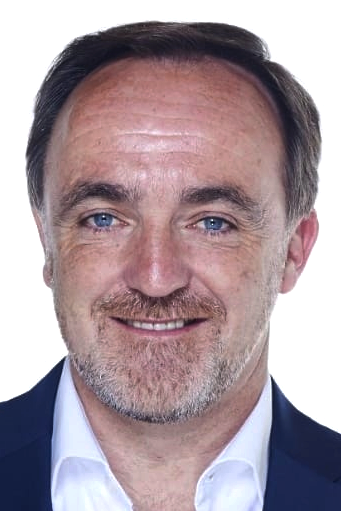

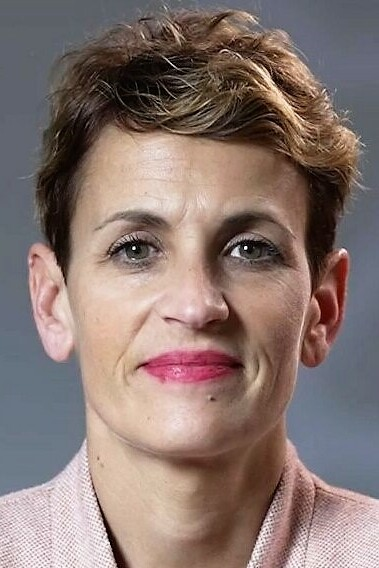

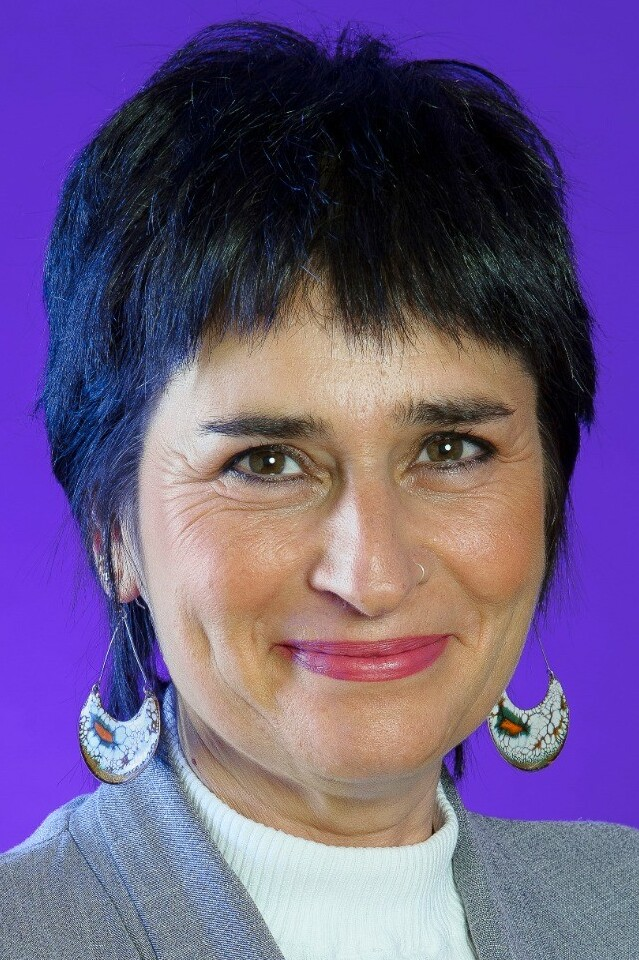

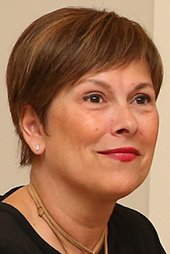

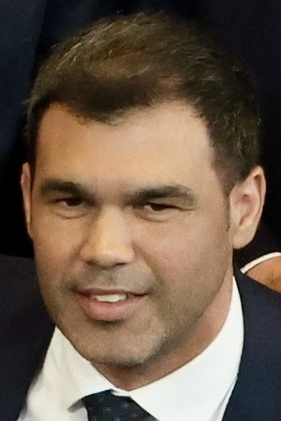

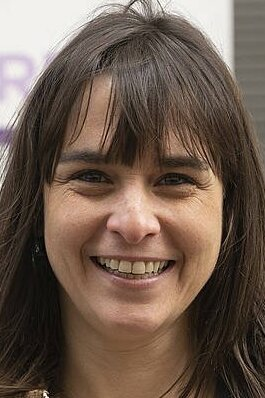
	First party	Second party	Third party
Leader	Javier Esparza	María Chivite	Laura Aznal
Party	UPN	PSN–PSOE	EH Bildu
Leader since	30 November 2014	19 October 2014	6 May 2022
Last election	15 seats (NA+) (Note: Within the NA+ alliance in the 2019 election.)	11 seats, 20.6%	7 seats, 14.5%
Seats won	15	11	9
Seat change	0	0	▲2
Popular vote	92,392	68,247	56,535
Percentage	28.0%	20.7%	17.1%
Swing	n/a	▲0.1 pp	▲2.6 pp
	Fourth party	Fifth party	Sixth party
Leader	Uxue Barkos	Javier García	Begoña Alfaro
Party	GBai	PP	Contigo/Zurekin
Leader since	3 October 2014	4 December 2022	3 November 2022
Last election	9 seats, 17.3%	2 seats (NA+)	3 seats, 8.2% (Note: Results for Podemos (4.7%, 2 seats), Left (3.0%, 1 seat) and Equo (0.5%, 0 seats) in the 2019 election.)
Seats won	7	3	3
Seat change	▼2	▲1	0
Popular vote	43,660	24,019	20,095
Percentage	13.2%	7.3%	6.1%
Swing	▼4.0 pp	n/a	▼2.1 pp
President before election
María Chivite
PSN–PSOE
President after election
María Chivite
PSN–PSOE

A regional election was held in Navarre on 28 May 2023 to elect the 11th Parliament of the chartered community. All 50 seats in the Parliament were up for election. It was held concurrently with regional elections in eleven other autonomous communities and local elections all across Spain.

The 2019–2023 term had been dominated by the impact and effects of the COVID-19 pandemic, which had focused most of the efforts of the new government of María Chivite. This period also saw a normalization of the relations between the Socialist Party of Navarre (PSN–PSOE) and the abertzale left, dominated by EH Bildu, with whom the Socialists agreed to pass laws and budgets. On the right, the Navarra Suma alliance between the Navarrese People's Union (UPN), the People's Party of Navarre (PP) and Citizens (Cs) broke up, with the former two engaging in a bitter fight for dominance of their political space as support for the latter collapsed throughout Spain.

The election saw UPN holding out in better shape than anticipated by opinion polls—some of which had predicted a close race with the PSN—but with right-from-centre parties being unable to increase their support from the 2019 election, stagnating at 20 seats. Further, the election saw the entry into parliament for the first time of far-right Vox, with 4.3% and 2 seats. EH Bildu emerged as the third largest political party ahead of Geroa Bai (GBai), whose support collapsed to 13.2% and 7 seats following four years in which it had been a junior coalition partner in government, whereas the alliance of Podemos and the Left (I–E) held out to its 3 seats with 6.1% of the vote.

As a result of the election, President Chivite was able to get re-elected to a second consecutive term in office, the first time a PSN regional president has been able to do so since 1987.

== Overview ==
Under the 1982 Reintegration and Improvement of the Chartered Regime, the Parliament of Navarre was the unicameral legislature of the homonymous chartered community, having legislative power in devolved matters, as well as the ability to grant or withdraw confidence from a regional president. The electoral and procedural rules were supplemented by national law provisions.

=== Date ===
The term of the Parliament of Navarre expired four years after the date of its previous election, unless it was dissolved earlier. If no snap election was called before the last year of the legislative term, the election decree was required to be issued no later than 54 days before the scheduled election date and published on the following day in the Official Gazette of Navarre (BON), with election day taking place on the fourth Sunday of May four years after the previous election. The previous election was held on 26 May 2019, setting the latest possible date for election day on the fourth Sunday of May four years later, which was 28 May 2023.

The regional president had the prerogative to dissolve the Parliament of Navarre at any given time and call a snap election, provided that no motion of no confidence was in process, no nationwide election was due and some time requirements are met: namely, that dissolution did not occur either during the first legislative session or during the last year of parliament before its planned expiration, nor before one year after a previous one under this procedure. In the event of an investiture process failing to elect a regional president within a three-month period from election day, the Parliament was to be automatically dissolved and a fresh election called.

The election to the Parliament of Navarre was officially called on 4 April 2023 with the publication of the corresponding decree in the BON, setting election day for 28 May and scheduling for the chamber to reconvene on 16 June.

=== Electoral system ===
Voting for the Parliament was based on universal suffrage, comprising all Spanish nationals over 18 years of age, registered in Navarre and with full political rights, provided that they had not been deprived of the right to vote by a final sentence. Amendments in 2022 abolished the "begged" voting system (Spanish: Voto rogado), under which non-resident citizens were required to apply for voting. The begged vote system was attributed responsibility for a major decrease in the turnout of Spaniards abroad during the years it was in force.

The Parliament of Navarre had a minimum of 40 and a maximum of 60 seats, with electoral provisions fixing its size at 50. All were elected in a single multi-member constituency—corresponding to the chartered community's territory—using the D'Hondt method and closed-list proportional voting, with a three percent-threshold of valid votes (including blank ballots) regionally.

The law did not provide for by-elections to fill vacant seats; instead, any vacancies arising after the proclamation of candidates and during the legislative term were filled by the next candidates on the party lists or, when required, by designated substitutes.

=== Outgoing parliament ===
The table below shows the composition of the parliamentary groups in the chamber at the time of the election call.

Parliamentary composition in April 2023
Groups	Parties	Legislators	
Groups	Parties	Seats	Total
Sum Navarre Parliamentary Group	UPN	15	20
Sum Navarre Parliamentary Group	CS	3	20
Sum Navarre Parliamentary Group	PP	2	20
Socialist Party of Navarre Parliamentary Group	PSN–PSOE	11	11
Yes to the Future Parliamentary Group	GSB/GSV	6	9
Yes to the Future Parliamentary Group	EAJ/PNV	3	9
EH Bildu Navarre Parliamentary Group	Sortu	4	7
EH Bildu Navarre Parliamentary Group	EA	3	7
Mixed Group	Podemos	2	3
Mixed Group	I–E (n)	1	3

== Parties and candidates ==
The electoral law allowed for parties and federations registered in the interior ministry, alliances and groupings of electors to present lists of candidates. Parties and federations intending to form a coalition ahead of an election were required to inform the relevant electoral commission within 10 days of the election call, whereas groupings of electors needed to secure the signature of at least one percent of the electorate in Navarre, disallowing electors from signing for more than one list. Additionally, a balanced composition of men and women was required in the electoral lists, so that candidates of either sex made up at least 40 percent of the total composition.

Below is a list of the main parties and alliances which contested the election:

Candidacy	Parties and alliances	Leading candidate	Ideology	Previous result		Gov.	Ref.
Candidacy	Parties and alliances	Leading candidate	Ideology	Vote %	Seats	Gov.	Ref.
UPN	List: Navarrese People's Union (UPN)	Javier Esparza	Conservatism; Christian democracy Regionalism	36.6% (Note: Results for NA+ in the 2019 election.)	20	No	
CS	List: Citizens–Party of the Citizenry (CS)	Carlos Pérez-Nievas	Liberalism	36.6%	20	No	
PP	List: People's Party (PP); Navarre Platform (PN)	Javier García	Conservatism; Christian democracy	36.6%	20	No	
PSN–PSOE	List: Socialist Party of Navarre (PSN–PSOE)	María Chivite	Social democracy	20.6%	11	Yes	
GBai	List: Future Social Greens (GSB/GSV); Basque Nationalist Party (EAJ/PNV); Villava Group (AT)	Uxue Barkos	Basque nationalism Social democracy	17.3%	9	Yes	
EH Bildu	List: Basque Country Gather (EH Bildu) – Create (Sortu) – Basque Solidarity (EA) – Alternative (Alternatiba)	Laura Aznal	Basque independence Abertzale left Socialism	14.5%	7	No	
Contigo/ Zurekin	List: We Can (Podemos); United Left of Navarre (IUN/NEB) – Communist Party of the Basque Country (PCE/EPK) – The Dawn Marxist Organization (La Aurora (OM)) – Republican Left (IR); Assembly (Batzarre); Green Alliance (AV); Greens Equo (Verdes Equo)	Begoña Alfaro	Left-wing populism Direct democracy Democratic socialism	8.2%	3	Yes	
Vox	List: Vox (Vox)	Maite Nosti	Right-wing populism Ultranationalism; National conservatism	1.3%	0	No	

There was debate on whether the Navarra Suma (NA+) alliance between the Navarrese People's Union (UPN), Citizens–Party of the Citizenry (Cs) and the People's Party (PP) would be renewed ahead of the 2023 election, with some members within UPN advocating for their party to run under their own label instead while at most allowing some members from PP and Cs to be incorporated as independents within their lists.

UPN suffered a split following a troubling vote in the Congress of Deputies on the issue of labour reform on 3 February 2022, when deputies Sergio Sayas and Carlos García Adanero broke party discipline and voted against the reform proposed by Pedro Sánchez's government, almost succeeding in bringing it down despite the UPN leadership having pledged its support to the law. As a result, both Sayas and Adanero had their party membership suspended, who then pledged to run on their own under a brand new platform. This was materialized during an event held on 14 June 2022, when the platform—provisionally dubbed as "Navarre Platform" (Spanish: Plataforma Navarra)—was publicly announced, with the support of former high-ranking UPN officers such as former regional Development minister Luis Zarraluqui or former mayor of Estella Begoña Ganuza, among others. By the end of 2022, this platform had entered talks with the PP to evaluate the prospects of fielding a joint list to the regional election.

== Campaign ==
=== Debates ===
2023 Navarrese regional election debates
Date	Organizer(s)	Moderator(s)	P Present (Note: Denotes a main invitee attending the event.) S Surrogate (Note: Denotes a main invitee not attending the event, sending a surrogate in their place.) A Absent invitee								
Date	Organizer(s)	Moderator(s)	UPN	CS	PP	PSN	GBai	EH Bildu	C/Z	Audience	Ref.
12 May	Cadena SER	Javier Lorente	P Esparza	P Nievas	P García	P Chivite	P Barkos	P Aznal	P Alfaro	—	
16 May	Diario de Navarra	Yulen Garmendia	P Esparza	P Nievas	P García	P Chivite	P Barkos	P Aznal	P Alfaro	—	
18 May	Navarra TV	Roberto Cámara; Blanca Basiano	P Esparza	P Nievas	P García	P Chivite	P Barkos	P Aznal	P Alfaro	—	

== Opinion polls ==
The tables below list opinion polling results in reverse chronological order, showing the most recent first and using the dates when the survey fieldwork was done, as opposed to the date of publication. Where the fieldwork dates are unknown, the date of publication is given instead. The highest percentage figure in each polling survey is displayed with its background shaded in the leading party's colour. If a tie ensues, this is applied to the figures with the highest percentages. The "Lead" column on the right shows the percentage-point difference between the parties with the highest percentages in a poll.

=== Graphical summary ===
Local regression trend line of poll results from 26 May 2019 to 28 May 2023, with each line corresponding to a political party.

=== Voting intention estimates ===
The table below lists weighted voting intention estimates. Refusals are generally excluded from the party vote percentages, while question wording and the treatment of "don't know" responses and those not intending to vote may vary between polling organisations. When available, seat projections determined by the polling organisations are displayed below (or in place of) the percentages in a smaller font; 26 seats were required for an absolute majority in the Parliament of Navarre.

Color key:

Poll conducted after legal ban on opinion polls

Polling firm/Commissioner	Fieldwork date	Sample size	Turnout	NA+	PSN–PSOE	GBai	EH Bildu	Podemos	I–E (n)	Vox	UPN	PP	CS	C/Z	PN	Lead
2023 regional election	28 May 2023	—N/a	64.4	–	20.7; 11	13.2; 7	17.1; 9	(Note: Within C/ZN.)		4.3; 2	28.0; 15	7.3; 3	0.4; 0	6.1; 3	(Note: Within PP.)	7.3
Sigma Dos/EITB	22–27 May 2023	1,600	?	–	19.6; 10/11	16.0; 8/9	16.3; 9			4.9; 2	23.3; 12/13	9.8; 5	–	7.1; 3/4		3.7
NC Report/La Razón	22 May 2023	?	?	–	18.9; 10	15.7; 8	15.6; 8			3.8; 2	24.5; 13	10.6; 5	–	7.9; 4		5.6
KeyData/Público	17 May 2023	?	69.7	–	19.5; 10	16.7; 9	16.0; 8			4.1; 2	25.7; 14	8.9; 4	–	6.3; 3		6.2
EM-Analytics/El Plural	11–17 May 2023	600	?	–	19.4; 10	15.0; 8	15.8; 8			3.2; 1	31.3; 17	6.6; 3	1.6; 0	6.3; 3		11.9
Simple Lógica/Cadena SER	3–12 May 2023	1,202	?	–	24.0; 13	14.5; 8	15.5; 8			3.0; 0/1	24.0; 13	7.0; 3/4	1.5; 0	8.0; 4		Tie
Sigma Dos/EITB	3–11 May 2023	1,358	?	–	21.8; 11/12	14.6; 7/8	16.2; 8/9			3.7; 1/2	23.8; 12/13	10.1; 5	1.5; 0	7.2; 3/4		2.0
CIES/Diario de Navarra	2–11 May 2023	1,200	?	–	20.1; 10/11	15.4; 7/8	16.8; 8/9			4.3; 2	27.2; 14/15	9.5; 5	1.4; 0	4.9; 2		7.1
EM-Analytics/El Plural	4–10 May 2023	600	?	–	19.4; 10	15.1; 8	16.0; 8			3.2; 1	31.2; 17	6.5; 3	1.6; 0	6.3; 3		11.8
Gizaker/Grupo Noticias	8–9 May 2023	900	71	–	20.0; 10	19.0; 10	16.3; 9			3.1; 1	23.2; 12	10.6; 5	–	6.1; 3		3.2
Demométrica/Navarra TV	3–9 May 2023	1,200	74.6	–	20.1; 11	15.4; 7/8	15.9; 8/9			3.9; 1/2	24.5; 13	10.6; 5/6	1.1; 0	6.5; 3		4.4
EM-Analytics/El Plural	26 Apr–3 May 2023	600	?	–	19.3; 10	15.2; 8	16.1; 8			3.3; 1	30.9; 17	7.0; 3	1.2; 0	6.3; 3		11.6
Simple Lógica/elDiario.es	18–26 Apr 2023	451	71.0	–	20.1; 10/11	15.6; 8/9	16.7; 9			3.3; 1/2	21.8; 11/12	11.9; 6	2.0; 0	6.6; 3		1.7
CIS	10–26 Apr 2023	507	?	–	18.8; 9/12	16.6; 8/10	15.9; 8/10			5.0; 2/3	21.5; 10/13	10.8; 5/6	0.8; 0	6.3; 2/4		2.7
EM-Analytics/El Plural	19–25 Apr 2023	600	?	–	19.3; 10	15.4; 8	16.1; 8			3.3; 1	30.6; 17	7.0; 3	1.2; 0	6.4; 3		11.3
Aztiker/Gara	11–25 Apr 2023	500	?	–	18.7; 10	15.6; 8	16.0; 8			4.0; 2	27.5; 15	6.5; 3	–	9.1; 4		8.8
EM-Analytics/El Plural	12–18 Apr 2023	600	?	–	19.5; 10	15.2; 8	16.0; 8			3.5; 1	31.0; 17	6.4; 3	1.3; 0	6.6; 3		11.5
EM-Analytics/El Plural	5–11 Apr 2023	600	?	–	20.1; 10	14.7; 8	16.0; 8			3.7; 2	31.6; 17	5.4; 2	1.4; 0	6.7; 3		11.5
EM-Analytics/El Plural	27 Mar–4 Apr 2023	600	?	–	20.2; 10	14.9; 8	15.8; 8			3.7; 2	31.4; 17	5.3; 2	1.5; 0	6.6; 3		11.2
KeyData/Público	3 Apr 2023	?	69.1	–	18.2; 10	16.9; 9	15.5; 8			3.1; 1	27.5; 15	8.3; 4	–	6.5; 3		9.3
Simple Lógica/PSN	13–17 Mar 2023	813	?	–	23.0; 12/13	14.0; 7	16.0; 8			3.0; 1/2	25.0; 13/14	9.0; 4/5	1.0; 0	6.0; 3		2.0
NC Report/La Razón	3–10 Mar 2023	?	69.2	–	15.1; 8	17.1; 9	14.2; 7			3.1; 1	28.8; 16	9.4; 5	–	8.3; 4		11.7
GAD3/EITB	22–27 Feb 2023	1,204	?	–	18.9; 10/11	16.7; 8/9	15.1; 8			4.4; 2	23.1; 12	11.9; 6	–	6.3; 3		4.2
Aztiker/Gara	14–25 Feb 2023	500	?	–	18.5; 10	16.0; 8	16.1; 8			3.9; 2	27.5; 15	7.1; 3	–	8.2; 4		9.0
Gizaker/Grupo Noticias	7–10 Feb 2023	1,200	?	–	21.2; 11/12	18.4; 9/10	17.0; 9			? 0	26.4; 14/15	6.5; 3	? 0	6.6; 3		5.2
Sigma Dos/El Mundo	27 Dec–2 Jan 2023	700	?	–	17.4; 9	16.2; 8/9	15.1; 8	2.9; 0/1	4.5; 2	4.0; 2	31.9; 17/18	6.6; 3	1.0; 0	–	–	14.5
BIOK/PSN	5–22 Dec 2022	1,000	?	–	25.0; 13	13.0; 7	15.0; 8			2.0; 0	27.0; 14	8.0; 4	1.0; 0	8.0; 4	–	2.0
CIS (Note: Vote+Simpathy figures with undecided and/or abstentionists excluded.)	17 Nov–2 Dec 2022	205	?	–	26.0; 12/19	7.8; 2/5	14.5; 8/11			3.2; 0/3	21.4; 10/17	5.9; 2/4	2.9; 0/2	7.9; 3/7	–	4.6
EM-Analytics/Electomanía	16 Oct–25 Nov 2022	207	?	38.4; 20	20.9; 10	13.6; 7	15.3; 8			4.2; 2	(Note: Within NA+.)			6.7; 3	–	17.5
Gizaker/EITB	2–4 May 2022	650	?	32.1; 17	21.9; 11	15.0; 8	17.3; 9	3.5; 1	4.5; 2	3.9; 2				–	–	10.2
CIES/PSN	29 Mar–21 Apr 2022	1,201	?	–	24.5; 13	14.0; 7	15.0; 8			5.0; 2/3	25.0; 14	4.0; 1/2	–	8.5; 4	2.0; 0	0.5
CIES/UPN	Apr 2022	?	68	–	20.5; 10	–	–	–	–	–	31.5; 17	–	–	–	–	11.0
UPNA/Parliament of Navarre	9–18 Sep 2021	1,200	72.2	34.5; 18/19	23.0; 12/13	13.1; 7	14.0; 7	4.0; 2	4.8; 2	1.5; 0				–	–	11.5
inPactos	19–27 Apr 2021	800	?	35.0; 19	23.0; 12	16.0; 8	13.5; 7	6.0; 3	3.0; 1	2.0; 0				–	–	12.0
SyM Consulting	24–25 Mar 2021	691	72.4	36.0; 20	20.9; 11/12	17.6; 9/10	15.0; 8	2.7; 0	3.2; 1	2.4; 0				–	–	15.1
ElectoPanel/Electomanía	15 Oct 2020	740	?	37.4; 21	22.3; 12	13.8; 7	16.7; 9	3.2; 1	2.8; 0	2.0; 0				–	–	15.1
UPNA/Parliament of Navarre	9–19 Sep 2020	1,200	72.2	36.4; 20	22.6; 12	16.2; 8	13.9; 7	4.0; 2	3.1; 1	1.5; 0				–	–	13.8
SyM Consulting	21–23 May 2020	667	72.0	38.1; 21	19.7; 10/11	17.9; 9/10	14.7; 8	3.5; 1	2.4; 0	2.1; 0				–	–	18.4
ElectoPanel/Electomanía	1 Apr–15 May 2020	?	?	37.0; 20	22.5; 12	13.2; 7	17.1; 9	3.8; 1	3.0; 1	1.5; 0				–	–	14.5
November 2019 general election	10 Nov 2019	—N/a	65.9	29.6 (15)	25.0 (13)	3.8 (2)	16.9 (9)			5.8 (3)				16.6 (8)	–	4.6
2019 regional election	26 May 2019	—N/a	68.5	36.6; 20	20.6; 11	17.3; 9	14.5; 7	4.7; 2	3.0; 1	1.3; 0				–	–	16.0

=== Voting preferences ===
The table below lists raw, unweighted voting preferences.

Polling firm/Commissioner	Fieldwork date	Sample size	NA+	PSN–PSOE	GBai	EH Bildu	Podemos	I–E (n)	Vox	UPN	PP	CS	C/Z	PN	Question	X mark	Lead
2023 regional election (Note: Does not include non-resident citizens.)	28 May 2023	—N/a	–	13.8	8.9	11.5			2.9	18.7	4.8	0.3	4.1		—N/a	32.2	4.9
Simple Lógica/Cadena SER	3–12 May 2023	1,202	–	16.6	–	–			–	12.8	–	–	–		–	–	3.8
Sigma Dos/EITB	3–11 May 2023	1,358	–	17.5	9.2	11.1			3.1	15.1	5.8	0.7	5.2		20.2	9.6	2.4
Simple Lógica/elDiario.es	18–26 Apr 2023	451	–	13.1	7.3	12.9			1.7	10.9	6.1	1.0	7.1		21.9	16.9	0.2
CIS	10–26 Apr 2023	507	–	12.8	10.2	11.8			3.5	13.4	7.0	0.5	3.6		29.0	4.3	0.6
Simple Lógica/PSN	13–17 Mar 2023	813	–	15.9	7.4	8.6			2.6	14.6	3.3	0.2	3.7		–	–	1.3
GAD3/EITB	22–27 Feb 2023	1,204	–	16.2	9.5	9.8			4.1	12.6	7.8	0.6	5.0		11.5	13.5	3.6
CIS	17 Nov–2 Dec 2022	205	–	14.7	4.0	11.3			2.0	16.2	3.5	0.4	4.6	–	34.3	2.3	1.5
CIES/PSN	29 Mar–21 Apr 2022	1,201	–	20.4	10.0	12.1			1.9	16.0	1.5	0.7	6.2	0.3	24.0	1.6	4.4
UPNA/Parliament of Navarre	9–18 Sep 2021	1,200	10.1	14.9	8.1	9.5	7.2	3.4	0.8				–	–	32.6	8.6	4.8
UPNA/Parliament of Navarre	9–19 Sep 2020	1,200	18.0	17.7	6.1	9.9	3.3	1.4	1.0				–	–	31.5	7.9	0.3
November 2019 general election	10 Nov 2019	—N/a	20.3	17.2	2.6	11.6			4.0				11.4	–	—N/a	30.7	3.1
2019 regional election	26 May 2019	—N/a	26.2	14.8	12.4	10.5	3.4	2.2	0.9				–	–	—N/a	27.8	11.4

=== Victory preferences ===
The table below lists opinion polling on the victory preferences for each party in the event of a regional election taking place.

Polling firm/Commissioner	Fieldwork date	Sample size	PSN–PSOE	EH Bildu	UPN	Other/ None	Question	Lead
Aztiker/Gara	14–25 Feb 2023	500	14.2	12.5	16.2	–	–	2.0

=== Victory likelihood ===
The table below lists opinion polling on the perceived likelihood of victory for each party in the event of a regional election taking place.

Polling firm/Commissioner	Fieldwork date	Sample size	PSN–PSOE	EH Bildu	UPN	Other/ None	Question	Lead
Aztiker/Gara	14–25 Feb 2023	500	17.5	8.7	26.3	–	–	8.8

== Results ==
← Summary of the 28 May 2023 Parliament of Navarre election results →
Parties and alliances	Popular vote			Seats	
Parties and alliances	Votes	%	±pp	Total	+/−
Navarrese People's Union (UPN)^{1}	92,392	28.01	n/a	15	±0
Socialist Party of Navarre (PSN–PSOE)	68,247	20.69	+0.06	11	±0
Basque Country Gather (EH Bildu)	56,535	17.14	+2.60	9	+2
Yes to the Future (GBai)	43,660	13.24	−4.08	7	−2
People's Party (PP)^{1}	24,019	7.28	n/a	3	+1
We Can–United Left–Assembly–Green Alliance–Greens Equo (Contigo/Zurekin)^{2}	20,095	6.09	−1.66	3	±0
Vox (Vox)	14,197	4.30	+3.00	2	+2
For a Fairer World (PUM+J)	1,740	0.53	New	0	±0
Citizens–Party of the Citizenry (CS)^{1}	1,273	0.39	n/a	0	−3
Sunflower (Eguzkilore)	1,261	0.38	New	0	±0
Foral Will (Voluntad Foral)	582	0.18	New	0	±0
Blank ballots	5,860	1.78	+1.00		
Total	329,861			50	±0
Valid votes	329,861	98.62	−0.76		
Invalid votes	4,632	1.38	+0.76		
Votes cast / turnout	334,493	64.45	−4.08		
Abstentions	184,505	35.55	+4.08		
Registered voters	518,998				
Sources
Footnotes: ^{1} Within the Sum Navarre alliance in the 2019 election.; ^{2} We Can–United Left–Assembly–Green Alliance–Greens Equo results are compared to the combined totals of We Can and Left in the 2019 election.

Popular vote
UPN	28.01%
PSN–PSOE	20.69%
EH Bildu	17.14%
GBai	13.24%
PP	7.28%
Contigo/Zurekin	6.09%
Vox	4.30%
Others	1.47%
Blank ballots	1.78%

Seats
UPN	30.00%
PSN–PSOE	22.00%
EH Bildu	18.00%
GBai	14.00%
PP	6.00%
Contigo/Zurekin	6.00%
Vox	4.00%

== Aftermath ==
=== Government formation ===
Investiture; Nomination of María Chivite (PSN)
Ballot →	14 August 2023	15 August 2023
Required majority →	26 out of 50	Simple
Yes: • PSN (11); • GBai (7); • Contigo/Zurekin (3)	21 / 50	21 / 50
No: • UPN (15); • PP (3); • Vox (2)	20 / 50	20 / 50
Abstentions: • EH Bildu (9)	9 / 50	9 / 50
Absentees	0 / 50	0 / 50

== Bibliography ==
- Ley Orgánica 13/1982, de 10 de agosto, de reintegración y amejoramiento del Régimen Foral de Navarra (Organic Law 13/1982). Official State Gazette (in Spanish). 10 August 1982 [version as of 28 October 2010]. BOE-A-1982-20824.
- Ley Orgánica 5/1985, de 19 de junio, del Régimen Electoral General (Organic Law 5/1985). Official State Gazette (in Spanish). 19 June 1985 [version as of 3 October 2022]. BOE-A-1985-11672.
- Ley Foral 16/1986, de 17 de noviembre, reguladora de las elecciones al Parlamento de Navarra (Foral Law 16/1986). Official State Gazette (in Spanish). 17 November 1986 [version as of 11 June 2004]. BOE-A-1987-1255.
- Ley Foral 14/2004, de 3 de diciembre, del Gobierno de Navarra y de su Presidente (Foral Law 14/2004). Official State Gazette (in Spanish). 3 December 2004 [version as of 20 May 2021]. BOE-A-2005-1576.
- Decreto Foral 3/2023, de 3 de abril, de la Presidenta de la Comunidad Foral de Navarra, de convocatoria de elecciones al Parlamento de Navarra (Foral Decree 3/2023). Official State Gazette (in Spanish). 3 April 2023. BOE-A-2023-8485.
