= Javier García (politician, born 1985) =

Spanish politician

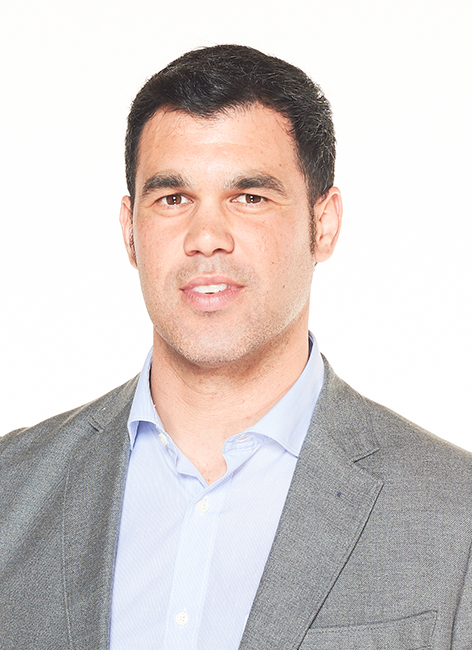

Javier García Jiménez (born 1985) is a Spanish politician of the People's Party (PP). He was elected to the Parliament of Navarre in 2015 and was president of the People's Party of Navarre from 2022 until his resignation in 2026.

== Biography ==
García was born in Cintruénigo in Navarre. He began his political activism in the youth wing of the Convergence of Democrats of Navarre (CDN), and upon that organisation's dissolution in 2011, he joined the People's Party (PP).

In the 2015 Navarrese regional election, García was second on the PP list behind Ana Beltrán. The party took two seats, making it the joint smallest of seven in the Parliament of Navarre.

In the 2019 Navarrese regional election, the PP aligned with the Navarrese People's Union (UPN) and Citizens in the coalition Navarra Suma. García was 10th on the list. The coalition took 20 seats and became the largest group. However, María Chivite of the Spanish Socialist Workers' Party (PSOE) became President of the Government of Navarre due to having 23 votes in favour from her party, Geroa Bai, Podemos and the United Left.

In December 2022, García ran unopposed for party president at the 8th Congress of the People's Party of Navarre (PPN) and was elected with 97.22% of the vote. In the same month, Navarra Suma was disbanded.

García led the PP in the 2023 Navarrese regional election. His party won three seats.
