= Navarre Platform =

Navarre Platform Plataforma Navarra
- Leader: Sergio Sayas
- Founded: 14 June 2022
- Dissolved: 29 February 2024
- Split from: UPN
- Merged into: People's Party of Navarre
- Ideology: Navarrese regionalism Conservatism; Spanish unionism
- Political position: Centre-right to right-wing

Website
- plataformanavarra.com

Navarre Platform (Spanish: Plataforma Navarra) was a political electoral platform formed ahead of the 2023 Navarrese regional election by former Navarrese People's Union (UPN) Congress of Deputies MPs Sergio Sayas and Carlos García Adanero.

UPN suffered a split following a troubling vote in the Congress on the issue of labour reform on 3 February 2022, when Sayas and Adanero broke party discipline and voted against the reform proposed by Pedro Sánchez's government, almost succeeding in bringing it down despite the UPN leadership having pledged its support to the law. As a result, both Sayas and Adanero had their party membership suspended, both of whom then pledged to run on their own under a brand new platform. This was materialized during an event held on 14 June 2022, when the platform—provisionally dubbed as "Navarre Platform" (Spanish: Plataforma Navarra)—was publicly announced, with the support of former high-ranking UPN officers such as former regional Development minister Luis Zarraluqui or former mayor of Estella Begoña Ganuza, among others.

The platform was one of the reasons for the political end of the Navarra Suma alliance on 15 August 2022, as the regional branch of the People's Party (PP) aimed at allying themselves with Sayas and Adanero, a scenario that would put it at odds with UPN.
