= 2023 Spanish regional elections =

- 28 May 2023

736 seats in the regional parliaments of Aragon, Asturias, Balearic Islands, Canary Islands, Cantabria, Castilla–La Mancha, Extremadura, La Rioja, Madrid, Murcia, Navarre and the Valencian Community
Regional administrations by leading party in 2023
National parties
PP (11+2)
PSOE (3)
Regional parties
ERC (1)
EAJ/PNV (1)
CCa (1)

Regional elections were held in Spain during 2023 to elect the regional parliaments of twelve of the seventeen autonomous communities: Aragon, Asturias, the Balearic Islands, the Canary Islands, Cantabria, Castilla–La Mancha, Extremadura, La Rioja, Madrid, Murcia, Navarre and the Valencian Community. 736 of 1,211 seats in the regional parliaments were up for election. The elections were held on 28 May (concurrently with local elections all across the country).

The results produced a landslide victory for the right-of-centre political forces, erasing all the gains made by the ruling Spanish Socialist Workers' Party (PSOE) in 2015 and 2019. The right-wing bloc recovered power in several regions and even broke through progressive strongholds such as Extremadura, with the PSOE only holding power in Castilla–La Mancha, Asturias and Navarre. This outcome prompted Prime Minister Pedro Sánchez to call a snap general election.

== Election date ==
Determination of election day varied depending on the autonomous community. Typically, most autonomous communities held their elections on the fourth Sunday of May every four years, concurrently with nationwide local elections, while others had their own, separate electoral cycles. In some cases, regional presidents had the prerogative to dissolve parliament and call for extra elections at a different time, but newly elected assemblies were restricted to serving out what remained of their previous four year-terms without altering the period to their next ordinary election. In other cases—Andalusia (since 1994), Aragon (2007), the Balearic Islands (2007), the Basque Country (1981), the Canary Islands (2018), Castile and León (2007), Catalonia (1985), Extremadura (2011), Galicia (1985), Navarre (2010) and the Valencian Community (2006)—the law granted regional presidents the power to call snap elections resulting in fresh four-year parliamentary terms.

By the time of the 2023 regional elections, this prerogative had been exercised by Castile and León by holding a snap regional election on 13 February 2022. The Valencian Community, which had its electoral cycle separated from other regions in April 2019, brought it back to May in 2023.

== Regional governments ==
The following table lists party control in autonomous communities. Gains for a party are highlighted in that party's colour.

Election day	Region	Previous control	New control
28 May	Aragon	Spanish Socialist Workers' Party (PSOE)	People's Party (PP)
28 May	Asturias	Spanish Socialist Workers' Party (PSOE)	Spanish Socialist Workers' Party (PSOE)
28 May	Balearic Islands	Spanish Socialist Workers' Party (PSOE)	People's Party (PP)
28 May	Canary Islands	Spanish Socialist Workers' Party (PSOE)	Canarian Coalition (CCa)
28 May	Cantabria	Regionalist Party of Cantabria (PRC)	People's Party (PP)
28 May	Castilla–La Mancha	Spanish Socialist Workers' Party (PSOE)	Spanish Socialist Workers' Party (PSOE)
28 May	Extremadura	Spanish Socialist Workers' Party (PSOE)	People's Party (PP)
28 May	La Rioja	Spanish Socialist Workers' Party (PSOE)	People's Party (PP)
28 May	Madrid	People's Party (PP)	People's Party (PP)
28 May	Murcia	People's Party (PP)	People's Party (PP)
28 May	Navarre	Spanish Socialist Workers' Party (PSOE)	Spanish Socialist Workers' Party (PSOE)
28 May	Valencian Community	Spanish Socialist Workers' Party (PSOE)	People's Party (PP)

== Summary by region ==
=== May (12 regions) ===
==== Aragon ====
Parties and alliances	Votes	%	±pp	Seats	+/−
PP	237,817	35.51	+14.64	28	+12
PSOE	197,919	29.55	–1.29	23	–1
Vox	75,349	11.25	+5.17	7	+4
CHA	34,163	5.10	–1.16	3	±0
Existe	33,190	4.96	New	3	+3
Podemos–AV	26,923	4.02	–4.09	1	–4
IU	20,959	3.13	–0.19	1	±0
PAR	13,988	2.09	–2.99	1	–2
CS–Tú Aragón	8,595	1.28	–15.39	0	–12
Others	10,026	1.50		0	±0
Blank ballots	10,846	1.62	+0.64		
Valid votes	669,775	98.77	–0.56		
Invalid votes	8,337	1.23	+0.56		
Votes cast / turnout	678,112	66.54	+0.38		
Registered voters	1,019,050				

==== Asturias ====
Parties and alliances	Votes	%	±pp	Seats	+/−
PSOE	195,999	36.50	+1.24	19	–1
PP	175,131	32.61	+15.09	17	+7
Vox	54,273	10.11	+3.68	4	+2
IU–MP–IAS	40,774	7.59	+0.97	3	+1
Podemos Asturies	21,052	3.92	–7.12	1	–3
Foro	19,652	3.66	–2.86	1	–1
SOS Asturias	5,838	1.09	New	0	±0
CS	4,974	0.93	–13.04	0	–5
Others	9,807	1.83		0	±0
Blank ballots	9,523	1.77	–0.67		
Valid votes	537,023	98.54	–0.52		
Invalid votes	7,979	1.46	+0.52		
Votes cast / turnout	545,002	56.85	+1.73		
Registered voters	958,658				

==== Balearic Islands ====
Parties and alliances	Votes	%	±pp	Seats	+/−
PP	161,267	35.79	+13.59	25	+9
PSIB–PSOE	119,540	26.53	–0.84	18	–1
Vox	62,637	13.90	+5.78	8	+5
Més	37,651	8.35	–0.83	4	±0
EUIB–Podemos	19,980	4.43	–5.31	1	–5
El Pi	17,089	3.79	–3.51	0	–3
MxMe	6,486	1.44	+0.03	2	±0
CS	6,097	1.35	–8.55	0	–5
Sa Unió	1,747	0.39	+0.06	1	+1
GxF+PSOE	1,679	0.37	–0.07	0	–1
Others	9,264	2.06		0	±0
Blank ballots	7,207	1.60	+0.59		
Valid votes	450,644	98.72	–0.58		
Invalid votes	5,861	1.28	+0.58		
Votes cast / turnout	456,505	55.11	+1.18		
Registered voters	828,278				

==== Canary Islands ====
Parties and alliances	Votes	%	±pp	Seats	+/−
PSOE	247,811	27.17	–1.71	23	–2
CCa	201,401	22.08	+0.15	19	±0
PP	176,308	19.33	+4.15	15	+4
NC–BC	72,372	7.93	–1.12	5	±0
Vox	71,740	7.86	+5.39	4	+4
Podemos–IUC–SSP	35,777	3.92	–5.88	0	–4
DVC	28,899	3.17	New	0	±0
UxGC	17,153	1.88	New	0	±0
PACMA	11,190	1.23	+0.11	0	±0
ASG	6,765	0.74	+0.04	3	±0
CS	3,510	0.38	–6.98	0	–2
AHI	1,660	0.18	–0.11	1	±0
Others	21,686	2.38		0	±0
Blank ballots	15,947	1.75	+0.51		
Valid votes	912,219	98.10	–0.78		
Invalid votes	17,694	1.90	+0.78		
Votes cast / turnout	929,913	52.00	–0.59		
Registered voters	1,788,412				

==== Cantabria ====
Parties and alliances	Votes	%	±pp	Seats	+/−
PP	116,198	35.78	+11.74	15	+6
PRC	67,523	20.79	–16.85	8	–6
PSOE	66,917	20.61	+3.00	8	+1
Vox	35,982	11.08	+6.02	4	+2
Podemos–IU–AV	13,395	4.12	–0.92	0	±0
CS	7,527	2.32	–5.62	0	–3
Cantabristas	5,522	1.70	+1.21	0	±0
Others	5,855	1.80		0	±0
Blank ballots	5,809	1.79	+0.81		
Valid votes	324,728	97.98	–1.04		
Invalid votes	6,685	2.02	+1.04		
Votes cast / turnout	331,413	65.31	–0.40		
Registered voters	507,438				

==== Castilla–La Mancha ====
Parties and alliances	Votes	%	±pp	Seats	+/−
PSOE	490,288	45.04	+0.94	17	–2
PP	366,312	33.65	+5.12	12	+2
Vox	139,607	12.83	+5.81	4	+4
Podemos–IU–AV	45,317	4.16	–2.76	0	±0
CS	10,885	1.00	–10.38	0	–4
Others	20,474	1.88		0	±0
Blank ballots	15,570	1.43	+0.62		
Valid votes	1,088,453	98.28	–0.67		
Invalid votes	19,054	1.72	+0.67		
Votes cast / turnout	1,107,507	69.60	+0.15		
Registered voters	1,591,262				

==== Extremadura ====
Parties and alliances	Votes	%	±pp	Seats	+/−
PSOE	244,227	39.90	–6.87	28	–6
PP	237,384	38.78	+11.30	28	+8
Vox	49,798	8.13	+3.42	5	+5
Podemos–IU–AV	36,836	6.01	–1.19	4	±0
JUEx	15,559	2.54	New	0	±0
CS	5,463	0.89	–10.22	0	–7
Others	14,108	2.30		0	±0
Blank ballots	8,721	1.42	+0.51		
Valid votes	612,096	97.77	–0.90		
Invalid votes	13,937	2.23	+0.90		
Votes cast / turnout	626,033	70.35	+1.09		
Registered voters	889,836				

==== La Rioja ====
Parties and alliances	Votes	%	±pp	Seats	+/−
PP	76,205	45.38	+12.32	17	+5
PSOE	53,562	31.90	–6.77	12	–3
Vox	12,773	7.61	+3.74	2	+2
Podemos–IU	8,543	5.09	–1.56	2	±0
PR+EV	6,016	3.58	–1.03	0	±0
PLRi	4,349	2.59	New	0	±0
CS	1,473	0.88	–10.65	0	–4
Others	2,638	1.57		0	±0
Blank ballots	2,360	1.41	+0.46		
Valid votes	167,919	98.32	–0.67		
Invalid votes	2,860	1.68	+0.67		
Votes cast / turnout	170,779	67.79	+1.85		
Registered voters	251,919				

==== Madrid ====
Parties and alliances	Votes	%	±pp	Seats	+/−
PP	1,599,186	47.32	+2.56	70	+5
MM–VQ	620,631	18.36	+1.37	27	+3
PSOE	614,296	18.18	+1.38	27	+3
Vox	248,379	7.35	–1.80	11	–2
Podemos–IU–AV	161,032	4.76	–2.48	0	–10
CS	52,925	1.57	–2.00	0	±0
Others	80,668	2.39		0	±0
Blank ballots	35,107	1.04	+0.51		
Valid votes	3,379,477	98.99	–0.40		
Invalid votes	34,342	1.01	+0.40		
Votes cast / turnout	3,413,819	65.50	–6.24		
Registered voters	5,211,710				

==== Murcia ====
Parties and alliances	Votes	%	±pp	Seats	+/−
PP	293,051	42.79	+10.44	21	+5
PSOE	175,505	25.62	–6.84	13	–4
Vox	121,321	17.71	+8.24	9	+5
Podemos–IU–AV	32,173	4.69	–2.90	2	±0
MC REG	20,206	2.95	+0.72	0	±0
CS	10,480	1.53	–10.46	0	–6
MR–VE	8,919	1.30	New	0	±0
Others	14,899	2.18		0	±0
Blank ballots	8,263	1.20	+0.67		
Valid votes	684,817	98.56	–0.74		
Invalid votes	10,038	1.44	+0.74		
Votes cast / turnout	694,906	63.25	+0.93		
Registered voters	1,098,543				

==== Navarre ====
Parties and alliances	Votes	%	±pp	Seats	+/−
UPN	92,392	28.01	n/a	15	±0
PSN–PSOE	68,247	20.69	+0.06	11	±0
EH Bildu	56,535	17.14	+2.60	9	+2
GBai	43,660	13.24	–4.08	7	–2
PP	24,019	7.28	n/a	3	+1
Contigo/Zurekin	20,095	6.09	–1.66	3	±0
Vox	14,197	4.30	+3.00	2	+2
CS	1,273	0.39	n/a	0	–3
Others	3,116	0.94		0	±0
Blank ballots	5,860	1.78	+1.00		
Valid votes	329,861	98.62	–0.76		
Invalid votes	4,632	1.38	+0.76		
Votes cast / turnout	334,493	64.45	–4.08		
Registered voters	518,998				

==== Valencian Community ====
Parties and alliances	Votes	%	±pp	Seats	+/−
PP	881,893	35.75	+16.63	40	+21
PSPV–PSOE	708,142	28.70	+4.49	31	+4
Compromís	357,989	14.51	–2.17	15	–2
Vox	310,184	12.57	+1.98	13	+3
Unides Podem–EUPV	88,152	3.57	–4.53	0	–8
CS	37,095	1.50	–16.20	0	–18
Others	52,496	2.13		0	±0
Blank ballots	31,035	1.26	+0.50		
Valid votes	2,466,986	98.75	+0.17		
Invalid votes	31,104	1.25	–0.17		
Votes cast / turnout	2,498,090	66.96	–6.76		
Registered voters	3,730,659				

== Bibliography ==
- Ley Orgánica 5/1985, de 19 de junio, del Régimen Electoral General (Organic Law 5/1985). Official State Gazette (in Spanish). 19 June 1985 [version as of 3 October 2022]. BOE-A-1985-11672.
