= United Left of Navarre =

- Basque name: Nafarroako Ezker Batua
- Spanish name: Izquierda Unida de Navarra
- General Coordinator: Carlos Guzmán Pérez
- Founded: 1986
- Headquarters: Calle Mayor, 20. 31001 Pamplona
- Membership (2016): 438
- Ideology: Socialism; Anti-capitalism; Communism; Republicanism; Feminism; Federalism; Pro-Basque
- Political position: Left-wing to far-left
- National affiliation: United Left
- Regional affiliation: Izquierda-Ezkerra (2011–2023); Contigo Navarra (since 2022)
- Union affiliation: CCOO
- Members: Communist Party of Euskadi (Navarrese section); Izquierda Abierta; Gazte Komunistak; Republican Left of Navarre; Independents Formerly: Party of Socialist Action (1986–2001); Progressive Federation (1986–1988); Carlist Party of Euskal Herria (1986–1987); Humanist Party (1986)
- Parliament of Navarre: 1 / 50 Inside Contigo Navarra

Website
- www.iun-neb.org

United Left of Navarre (Spanish: Izquierda Unida de Navarra, Basque: Nafarroako Ezker Batua. IUN-NEB) is the Navarrese federation of the Spanish left-wing political and social movement United Left. José Miguel Nuin Moreno is the current General Coordinator. The major member of the coalition is the Communist Party of Euskadi (EPK-PCE, Basque federation of the Communist Party of Spain).

== History ==
In the 1996 Spanish general election IUN-NEB gained 1 of the 5 Navarrese seats in the Congreso de los Diputados.

Since 2011 IUN-NEB has a permanent alliance with Batzarre, Izquierda-Ezkerra (I-E). After the 2015 Navarrese regional election I-E signed a pact with Geroa Bai, EH Bildu and Podemos to remove the Navarrese People's Union (UPN) from power and elect Uxue Barkos as the president of Navarre.

== Election results ==
=== Parliament of Navarre ===
Parliament of Navarre
Election	Votes	%	Seats	+/–	Leading candidate	Government
1987	3,802	1.34 (#10)	0 / 50	0 (Note: Compared to the Communist Party of the Basque Country totals in the 1983 regional election.)	Francisco Jiménez	No seats
1991	11,167	4.07 (#5)	2 / 50	2	Félix Taberna	Opposition
1995	27,773	9.35 (#4)	5 / 50	3	Félix Taberna	Opposition
1999	20,879	6.88 (#4)	3 / 50	2	Félix Taberna	Opposition
2003	26,962	8.77 (#3)	4 / 50	1	Félix Taberna	Opposition
2007	14,337	4.35 (#5)	2 / 50	2	Jon Erro	Opposition
2011	Within I–E (n)		2 / 50	0	José Miguel Nuin	Opposition
2015	Within I–E (n)		1 / 50	1	José Miguel Nuin	Coalition
2019	Within I–E (n)		1 / 50	0	Marisa de Simón	Opposition
2023	Within CN-ZN		1 / 50	0	Begoña Alfaro	Coalition

== See also ==
- United Left (Spain)
- Communist Party of Euskadi
