= 2019 Navarrese regional election =

Election in the Spanish region of Navarre

- 26 May 2019

All 50 seats in the Parliament of Navarre 26 seats needed for a majority
- Opinion polls
- Registered: 511,225 ▲2.0%
- Turnout: 350,362 (68.5%) ▲0.2 pp
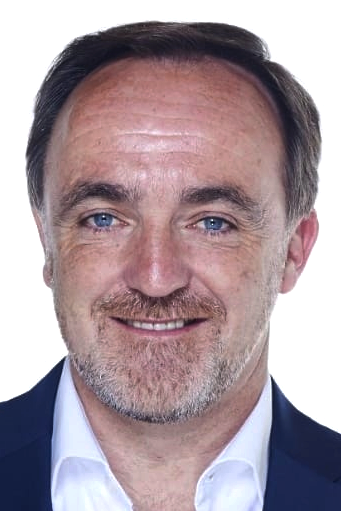

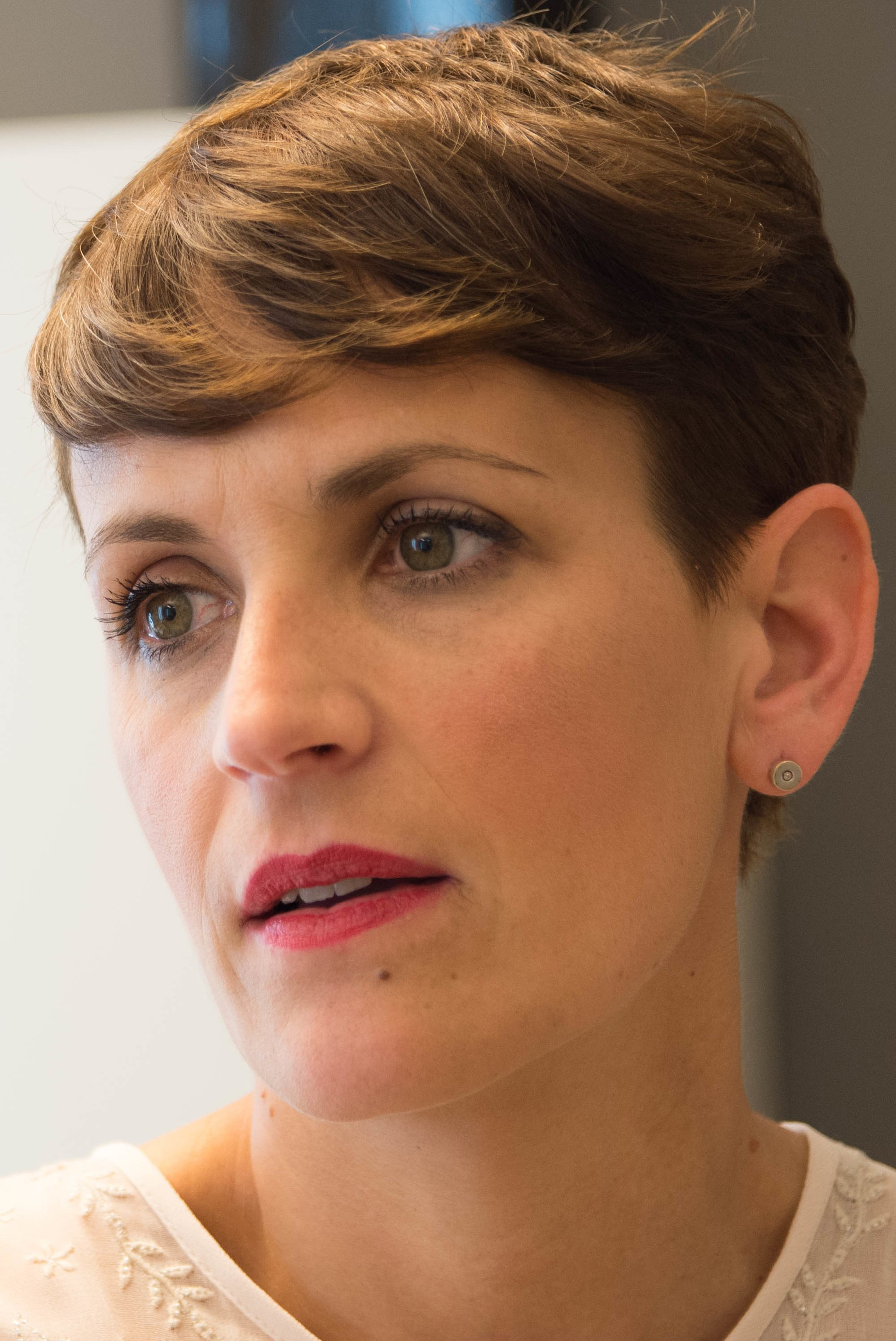

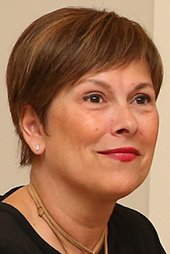

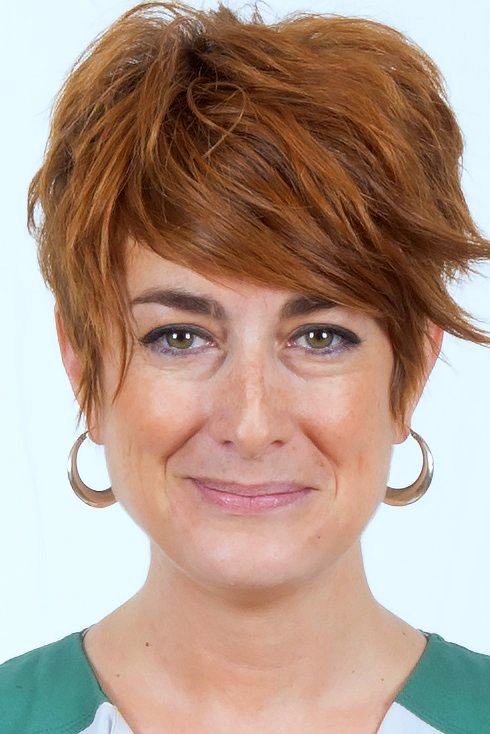

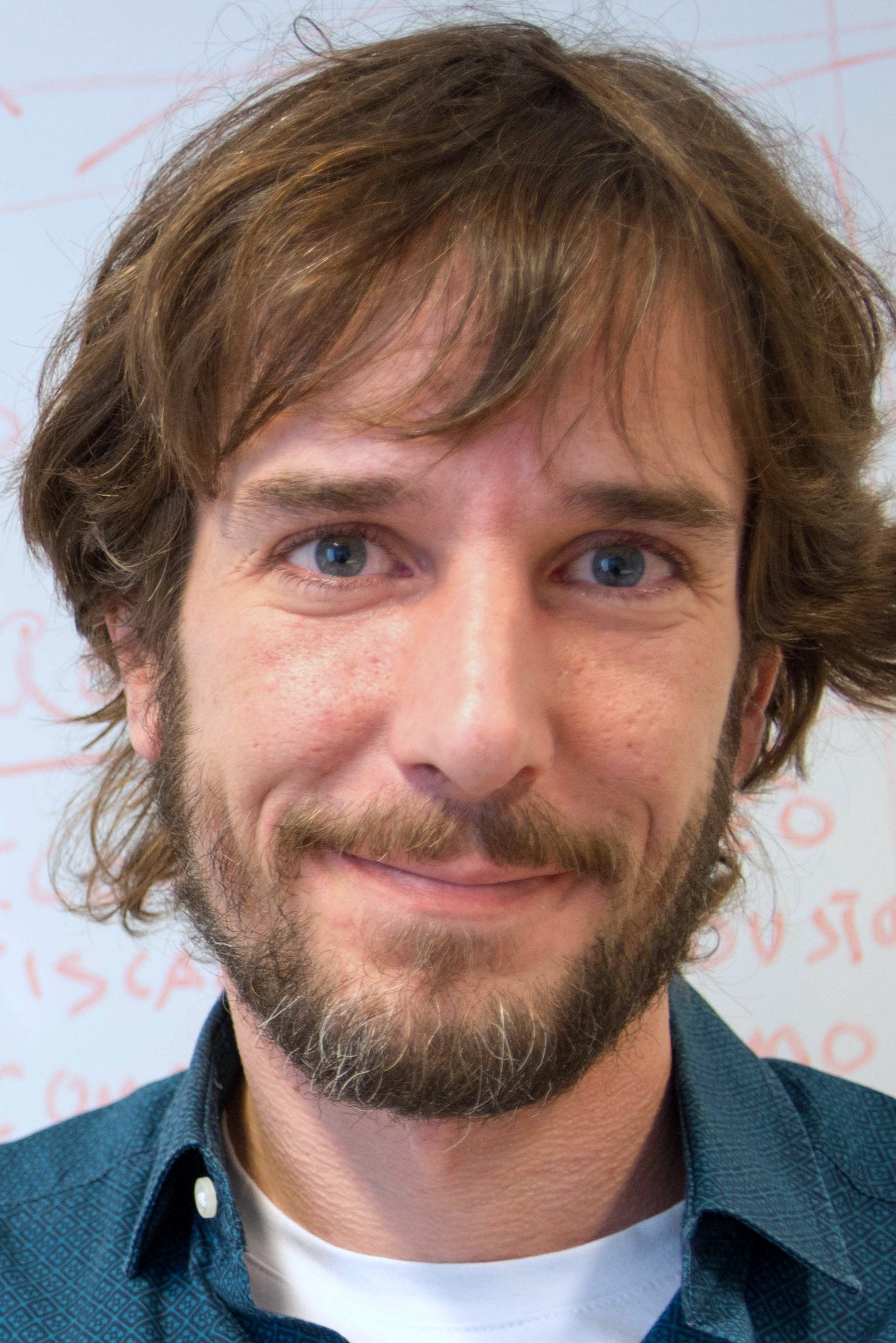

	First party	Second party	Third party
Leader	Javier Esparza	María Chivite	Uxue Barkos
Party	NA+	PSN–PSOE	GBai
Leader since	30 November 2014	19 October 2014	3 October 2014
Last election	17 seats, 34.3% (Note: Results for UPN (27.4%, 15 seats), PP (3.9%, 2 seats) and C's (3.0%, 0 seats) in the 2015 election.)	7 seats, 13.4%	9 seats, 15.8%
Seats won	20	11	9
Seat change	▲3	▲4	0
Popular vote	127,346	71,838	60,323
Percentage	36.6%	20.6%	17.3%
Swing	▲2.3 pp	▲7.2 pp	▲1.5 pp
	Fourth party	Fifth party	Sixth party
Leader	Bakartxo Ruiz	Mikel Buil	Marisa de Simón
Party	EH Bildu	Podemos	I–E (n)
Leader since	30 May 2018	27 November 2018	9 March 2019
Last election	8 seats, 14.2%	7 seats, 13.7%	2 seats, 3.7%
Seats won	7	2	1
Seat change	▼1	▼5	▼1
Popular vote	50,631	16,518	10,472
Percentage	14.5%	4.7%	3.0%
Swing	▲0.3 pp	▼9.0 pp	▼0.7 pp
President before election
Uxue Barkos
Zabaltzen (GBai)
President after election
María Chivite
PSN–PSOE

A regional election was held in Navarre on 26 May 2019 to elect the 10th Parliament of the chartered community. All 50 seats in the Parliament were up for election. It was held concurrently with regional elections in eleven other autonomous communities and local elections all across Spain, as well as the 2019 European Parliament election.

Ahead of the election, the three main right-from-centre parties—namely, Navarrese People's Union (UPN), the People's Party (PP) and Citizens (Cs)—signed an electoral alliance under the Navarra Suma (NA+) brand, in order to maximize their options against the incumbent government, formed by Geroa Bai (GBai), EH Bildu and Izquierda-Ezkerra (I–E) with external support from Podemos, which in the previous election had ousted UPN from power after 19 years of uninterrupted rule. Concurrently, the Socialist Party of Navarre (PSN–PSOE) under María Chivite was on the rise, benefitting from a national bandwagon effect for the party following the general election held only one month earlier, on 28 April.

The election saw a victory for the NA+ alliance, which was able to secure more seats than the incumbent government (20 to 19). In particular, the collapse in the Podemos's vote share benefitted the PSN–PSOE, which scored its best result since 2007. There was speculation that UPN would be able to access the regional government through an agreement or consent from the PSN, but Chivite opted instead to secure the support of GBai, Podemos and I–E, as well as EH Bildu's tactical abstention, to become the first Socialist president of Navarre since Javier Otano stepped down from the office in 1996.

== Overview ==
Under the 1982 Reintegration and Improvement of the Chartered Regime, the Parliament of Navarre was the unicameral legislature of the homonymous chartered community, having legislative power in devolved matters, as well as the ability to grant or withdraw confidence from a regional president. The electoral and procedural rules were supplemented by national law provisions.

=== Date ===
The term of the Parliament of Navarre expired four years after the date of its previous election, unless it was dissolved earlier. If no snap election was called before the last year of the legislative term, the election decree was required to be issued no later than 54 days before the scheduled election date and published on the following day in the Official Gazette of Navarre (BON), with election day taking place on the fourth Sunday of May four years after the previous election. The previous election was held on 24 May 2015, setting the latest possible date for election day on the fourth Sunday of May four years later, which was 26 May 2019.

The regional president had the prerogative to dissolve the Parliament of Navarre at any given time and call a snap election, provided that no motion of no confidence was in process, no nationwide election was due and some time requirements are met: namely, that dissolution did not occur either during the first legislative session or during the last year of parliament before its planned expiration, nor before one year after a previous one under this procedure. In the event of an investiture process failing to elect a regional president within a three-month period from election day, the Parliament was to be automatically dissolved and a fresh election called.

The election to the Parliament of Navarre was officially called on 2 April 2019 with the publication of the corresponding decree in the BON, setting election day for 26 May and scheduling for the chamber to reconvene on 19 June.

=== Electoral system ===
Voting for the Parliament was based on universal suffrage, comprising all Spanish nationals over 18 years of age, registered in Navarre and with full political rights, provided that they had not been deprived of the right to vote by a final sentence. (Note: Amendments in 2018 granted the right to vote to those legally incapacitated.) Additionally, non-resident citizens were required to apply for voting, a system known as "begged" voting (Spanish: Voto rogado).

The Parliament of Navarre had a minimum of 40 and a maximum of 60 seats, with electoral provisions fixing its size at 50. All were elected in a single multi-member constituency—corresponding to the chartered community's territory—using the D'Hondt method and closed-list proportional voting, with a three percent-threshold of valid votes (including blank ballots) regionally.

The law did not provide for by-elections to fill vacant seats; instead, any vacancies arising after the proclamation of candidates and during the legislative term were filled by the next candidates on the party lists or, when required, by designated substitutes.

=== Outgoing parliament ===
The table below shows the composition of the parliamentary groups in the chamber at the time of the election call.

Parliamentary composition in April 2019
Groups	Parties	Legislators	
Groups	Parties	Seats	Total
Navarrese People's Union Parliamentary Group	UPN	15	15
Yes to the Future Parliamentary Group	Zabaltzen	8	9
Yes to the Future Parliamentary Group	EAJ/PNV	1	9
EH Bildu Navarre Parliamentary Group	EH Bildu	8	8
We Can–Now Yes Parliamentary Group	Orain Bai	4 (Note: Laura Pérez, Carlos Couso, Rubén Velasco and Fanny Carrillo.)	7
We Can–Now Yes Parliamentary Group	Podemos	3	7
Socialist Party of Navarre Parliamentary Group	PSN–PSOE	7	7
Mixed Group	PP	2	4
Mixed Group	I–E (n)	2	4

== Parties and candidates ==
The electoral law allowed for parties and federations registered in the interior ministry, alliances and groupings of electors to present lists of candidates. Parties and federations intending to form a coalition ahead of an election were required to inform the relevant electoral commission within 10 days of the election call, whereas groupings of electors needed to secure the signature of at least one percent of the electorate in Navarre, disallowing electors from signing for more than one list. Additionally, a balanced composition of men and women was required in the electoral lists, so that candidates of either sex made up at least 40 percent of the total composition.

Below is a list of the main parties and alliances which contested the election:

Candidacy	Parties and alliances	Leading candidate	Ideology	Previous result		Gov.	Ref.
Candidacy	Parties and alliances	Leading candidate	Ideology	Vote %	Seats	Gov.	Ref.
NA+	List: Navarrese People's Union (UPN); Citizens–Party of the Citizenry (Cs); People's Party (PP)	Javier Esparza	Regionalism; Christian democracy Conservatism; Liberalism	34.3%	17	No	
GBai	List: Expanding (ZBN); Basque Nationalist Party (EAJ/PNV); Villava Group (AT)	Uxue Barkos	Basque nationalism Social democracy	15.8%	9	Yes	
EH Bildu	List: Basque Country Gather (EH Bildu) – Create (Sortu) – Basque Solidarity (EA) – Alternative (Alternatiba)	Bakartxo Ruiz	Basque independence Abertzale left Socialism	14.2%	8	Yes	
Podemos	List: We Can (Podemos)	Mikel Buil	Left-wing populism Direct democracy Democratic socialism	13.7%	7	No	
PSN–PSOE	List: Socialist Party of Navarre (PSN–PSOE)	María Chivite	Social democracy	13.4%	7	No	
I–E (n)	List: United Left of Navarre (IUN/NEB) – Communist Party of the Basque Country (PCE/EPK) – The Dawn Marxist Organization (La Aurora (OM)) – Republican Left (IR) – Feminist Party of Spain (PFE); Assembly (Batzarre)	Marisa de Simón	Socialism; Communism	3.7%	2	Yes	

== Opinion polls ==
The tables below list opinion polling results in reverse chronological order, showing the most recent first and using the dates when the survey fieldwork was done, as opposed to the date of publication. Where the fieldwork dates are unknown, the date of publication is given instead. The highest percentage figure in each polling survey is displayed with its background shaded in the leading party's colour. If a tie ensues, this is applied to the figures with the highest percentages. The "Lead" column on the right shows the percentage-point difference between the parties with the highest percentages in a poll.

=== Voting intention estimates ===
The table below lists weighted voting intention estimates. Refusals are generally excluded from the party vote percentages, while question wording and the treatment of "don't know" responses and those not intending to vote may vary between polling organisations. When available, seat projections determined by the polling organisations are displayed below (or in place of) the percentages in a smaller font; 26 seats were required for an absolute majority in the Parliament of Navarre.

Color key:

Poll conducted after legal ban on opinion polls

Polling firm/Commissioner	Fieldwork date	Sample size	Turnout	UPN	GBai	EH Bildu	Podemos	PSN–PSOE	PP	I–E (n)	Cs	Unidas Podemos	Vox	NA+	Lead
2019 regional election	26 May 2019	—N/a	68.5	(Note: Within NA+.)	17.3; 9	14.5; 7	4.7; 2	20.6; 11		3.0; 1		–	1.3; 0	36.6; 20	16.0
ElectoPanel/Electomanía	22–23 May 2019	?	?		18.4; 10	15.2; 8	9.1; 4	18.0; 9		4.1; 2		–	3.1; 1	31.2; 16	12.8
ElectoPanel/Electomanía	21–22 May 2019	?	?		18.3; 10	15.1; 8	8.9; 4	18.5; 10		4.1; 2		–	2.9; 0	31.1; 16	12.6
ElectoPanel/Electomanía	20–21 May 2019	?	?		18.4; 9	15.2; 8	9.0; 4	18.5; 10		4.0; 2		–	3.0; 1	31.0; 16	12.5
ElectoPanel/Electomanía	19–20 May 2019	?	?		18.3; 10	15.1; 8	9.1; 4	18.7; 10		3.9; 2		–	2.9; 0	30.7; 16	12.0
NC Report/La Razón	19 May 2019	?	?		? 8	? 7	? 4	20.1; 11		? 2		–	? 0	33.7; 18	13.6
inPactos	17–19 May 2019	1,200	?		17.0; 9	13.0; 7/8	? 4/5	17.5; 9/10		3.0; 1		–	3.3; 1	34.0; 18/19	16.5
ElectoPanel/Electomanía	16–19 May 2019	?	?		18.9; 10	15.5; 8	8.8; 4	18.0; 9		4.4; 2		–	3.7; 1	29.7; 16	10.8
Sigma Dos/El Mundo	17 May 2019	?	?		17.6; 9/10	13.5; 7	6.3; 3	18.4; 9/10		5.2; 2		–	1.0; 0	35.3; 19	16.9
Gizaker/Grupo Noticias	17 May 2019	900	70		20.6; 11	16.2; 8	8.7; 4	14.9; 8		5.3; 2		–	4.4; 2	28.8; 15	8.2
ElectoPanel/Electomanía	13–16 May 2019	?	?		18.6; 10	15.4; 8	8.6; 4	19.5; 10		3.7; 1		–	3.1; 1	30.1; 16	10.6
Gizaker/EITB	14–15 May 2019	650	70.0		18.5; 10	16.9; 9	10.3; 4/5	15.2; 8		3.4; 1/2		–	3.5; 1/2	31.0; 16/17	12.5
ElectoPanel/Electomanía	10–13 May 2019	?	?		18.5; 9	15.6; 8	8.4; 4	19.5; 10		4.0; 2		–	3.1; 1	29.6; 16	10.1
CIES/Diario de Navarra	6–13 May 2019	1,217	71		16.9; 8/9	14.5; 7/8	? 4/5	18.0; 9/10		3.8; 1/2		–	2.6; 0/1	34.8; 18/19	16.8
ElectoPanel/Electomanía	7–10 May 2019	?	?		18.2; 9	16.1; 8	7.9; 4	19.9; 10		4.4; 2		–	3.0; 1	29.3; 16	9.4
Gizaker/Grupo Noticias	7–9 May 2019	1,200	71.5		19.8; 10/11	15.3; 7/8	9.6; 5	16.6; 8/9		4.1; 2		–	4.3; 2	30.0; 15/16	10.2
ElectoPanel/Electomanía	4–7 May 2019	?	?		18.7; 10	16.0; 8	7.6; 4	19.3; 10		4.6; 2		–	3.2; 1	29.5; 15	10.2
ElectoPanel/Electomanía	29 Apr–4 May 2019	?	?		18.0; 10	16.6; 9	7.1; 3	19.5; 10		4.9; 2		–	2.9; 0	29.9; 16	10.4
April 2019 general election	28 Apr 2019	—N/a	72.5		6.1 (3)	12.7 (6)	(Note: Within Unidas Podemos.)	25.8 (14)				18.6 (10)	4.8 (2)	29.3 (15)	4.5
CIS	21 Mar–23 Apr 2019	381	?		14.0; 7/9	14.1; 7/8	10.8; 6	21.2; 11/12		4.4; 1/2		–	–	30.2; 16/17	9.0
CIES/Diario de Navarra	8–15 Apr 2019	800	71–74		17.6; 9/10	13.9; 7	8.4; 4	17.1; 9		? 1/2		–	? 0/1	34.7; 18/19	17.1
ElectoPanel/Electomanía	31 Mar–7 Apr 2019	?	?		20.2; 11	15.2; 8	6.9; 3	17.4; 9		4.9; 2		–	2.3; 0	31.3; 17	11.1
ElectoPanel/Electomanía	24–31 Mar 2019	?	?		20.0; 11	15.3; 8	7.0; 3	17.7; 9		5.1; 2		–	2.3; 0	30.6; 17	10.6
ElectoPanel/Electomanía	17–24 Mar 2019	?	?		19.9; 11	15.2; 8	7.1; 3	18.6; 10		4.7; 2		–	2.3; 0	30.5; 16	10.6
ElectoPanel/Electomanía	10–17 Mar 2019	?	?		19.5; 10	15.0; 8	7.3; 4	18.3; 10		4.7; 2		–	2.6; 0	30.5; 16	11.0
ElectoPanel/Electomanía	3–10 Mar 2019	?	?	25.9; 14	19.4; 10	15.0; 8	7.4; 4	18.3; 10	(Note: Within UPN.)	4.7; 2	5.1; 2	–	2.4; 0	–	6.5
ElectoPanel/Electomanía	22 Feb–3 Mar 2019	?	?	26.0; 14	18.8; 10	15.0; 8		19.3; 11			5.5; 3	7.0; 4	2.7; 0	–	6.7
Gizaker/EITB	23 Nov–3 Dec 2018	650	?	23.5; 13	23.0; 13	15.4; 8	7.5; 4	9.4; 5	3.0; 0	7.7; 4	6.6; 3	–	1.1; 0	–	0.5
GAD3/Navarra.com	16–18 Oct 2018	806	?	? 13	? 9	? 6	? 6	? 9	? 2	? 2	? 3	–	–	–	?
UPNA/Parliament of Navarre	3–10 Oct 2018	955	?	25.9; 15	18.4; 10	14.3; 8	6.4; 3	16.3; 9	2.2; 0	4.8; 2	5.4; 3	–	–	–	7.5
Telwind/Grupo Noticias	3–4 Sep 2018	1,200	68.6	25.4; 13/14	19.9; 10/11	14.9; 8	10.5; 5	13.6; 7	3.0; 0/1	4.2; 2	5.4; 2/3	–	–	–	5.5
GBai	6 Jun 2018	?	?	? 14	? 9/11	? 8	? 3/5	? 7/8	? 0/1	? 2	? 3	–	–	–	?
SyM Consulting	5–6 Jun 2018	700	66.1	24.3; 13/14	15.4; 8	14.5; 8	5.3; 2/3	20.0; 11	2.4; 0	5.9; 3	7.6; 4	–	–	–	4.3
Gizaker/EITB	14–21 May 2018	600	?	24.8; 13	19.6; 11	14.5; 8	8.5; 4	13.7; 7	1.6; 0	7.2; 4	6.4; 3	–	–	–	5.2
SyM Consulting	8–10 Mar 2018	1,100	69.6	23.9; 13/14	17.1; 9	16.7; 9	6.0; 3	16.0; 9	2.6; 0	4.9; 2	8.6; 4/5	–	–	–	6.8
inPactos (Note: "UPN gana, suben Geroa Bai y PSN y C's entra en el Parlamento foral". inPactos (in Spanish). 13 February 2018.)	15–27 Jan 2018	515	70	28.0; 15	18.0; 10	15.0; 8	7.0; 4	16.0; 8	4.0; 2	4.0; 2	3.0; 1	–	–	–	10.0
UPNA/Parliament of Navarre	25 Sep–8 Oct 2017	900	70	28.3; 16	15.3; 8	16.5; 9	11.2; 6	10.4; 5	5.3; 3	3.7; 2	3.1; 1	–	–	–	11.8
Gizaker/EITB	16–20 May 2017	600	?	25.2; 14	20.5; 11	15.1; 8	12.3; 7	11.2; 6	4.0; 2	4.4; 2	–	–	–	–	4.7
Telwind/Grupo Noticias	3–9 May 2017	1,200	?	26.7; 14/15	18.0; 10	14.8; 8	12.8; 7	11.7; 6	3.8; 2	4.5; 2	3.1; 0/1	–	–	–	8.7
UPNA/Parliament of Navarre	12–26 Sep 2016	800	67.4	27.5; 15	15.5; 8/9	15.6; 8/9	11.7; 6	12.4; 7	5.3; 3	3.8; 2	2.6; 0	–	–	–	11.9
2016 general election	26 Jun 2016	—N/a	67.4	(Note: Within PP.)	4.3 (2)	9.4 (5)		17.3 (9)	31.9 (17)		6.1 (3)	28.3 (15)	–	–	3.6
2015 general election	20 Dec 2015	—N/a	70.9		8.7 (4)	9.9 (5)	23.0 (12)	15.5 (8)	28.9 (16)	4.1 (2)	7.1 (3)	–	–	–	5.9
2015 regional election	24 May 2015	—N/a	68.3	27.4; 15	15.8; 9	14.2; 8	13.7; 7	13.4; 7	3.9; 2	3.7; 2	3.0; 0	–	–	–	11.6

=== Voting preferences ===
The table below lists raw, unweighted voting preferences.

Polling firm/Commissioner	Fieldwork date	Sample size	UPN	GBai	EH Bildu	Podemos	PSN–PSOE	PP	I–E (n)	Cs	Unidas Podemos	Vox	NA+	Question	X mark	Lead
2019 regional election (Note: Does not include non-resident citizens.)	26 May 2019	—N/a		12.4	10.5	3.4	14.8		2.2		–	0.9	26.2	—N/a	27.8	11.4
April 2019 general election	28 Apr 2019	—N/a		4.6	9.6		19.5				14.1	3.6	22.1	—N/a	23.7	2.6
CIS	21 Mar–23 Apr 2019	381		10.3	9.2	6.7	13.9		2.9		–	–	13.1	33.8	6.2	0.8
UPNA/Parliament of Navarre	3–10 Oct 2018	955	18.2	16.0	8.5	5.8	15.5	2.0	5.0	4.9	–	–	–	12.0	8.5	2.2
UPNA/Parliament of Navarre	25 Sep–8 Oct 2017	900	11.3	11.1	7.5	5.6	7.2	3.1	2.3	2.4	–	–	–	40.7	5.2	0.2
UPNA/Parliament of Navarre	12–26 Sep 2016	800	12.8	6.7	5.8	7.5	7.0	3.2	2.9	0.9	–	–	–	40.4	9.7	6.1
2016 general election	26 Jun 2016	—N/a		3.0	6.6		12.1	22.3		4.3	19.8	–	–	—N/a	29.4	2.5
2015 general election	20 Dec 2015	—N/a		6.4	7.3	16.9	11.4	21.3	3.0	5.2	–	–	–	—N/a	25.7	4.4
2015 regional election	24 May 2015	—N/a	19.2	11.2	10.1	9.7	9.5	2.8	2.6	2.1	–	–	–	—N/a	28.6	8.0

=== Victory preferences ===
The table below lists opinion polling on the victory preferences for each party in the event of a regional election taking place.

Polling firm/Commissioner	Fieldwork date	Sample size	GBai	EH Bildu	Podemos	PSN–PSOE	I–E (n)	Vox	NA+	Other/ None	Question	Lead
Gizaker/Grupo Noticias	7–9 May 2019	1,200	19.9	14.0	4.8	13.4	2.6	0.9	19.5	5.1	19.8	0.4

== Results ==
← Summary of the 26 May 2019 Parliament of Navarre election results →
Parties and alliances	Popular vote			Seats	
Parties and alliances	Votes	%	±pp	Total	+/−
Sum Navarre (NA+)^{1}	127,346	36.57	+2.24	20	+3
Socialist Party of Navarre (PSN–PSOE)	71,838	20.63	+7.26	11	+4
Yes to the Future (GBai)	60,323	17.32	+1.49	9	±0
Basque Country Gather (EH Bildu)	50,631	14.54	+0.29	7	−1
We Can (Podemos)	16,518	4.74	−8.93	2	−5
Left (I–E (n))	10,472	3.01	−0.68	1	−1
Vox (Vox)	4,546	1.31	New	0	±0
Equo–European Green Party (Equo)	1,597	0.46	−0.18	0	±0
Navarrese Cannabis Representation (RCN/NOK)	1,251	0.36	−0.15	0	±0
Navarrese Freedom (Ln)	502	0.14	−0.14	0	±0
Internationalist Solidarity and Self-Management (SAIn)	438	0.13	−0.13	0	±0
Blank ballots	2,731	0.78	−1.18		
Total	348,193			50	±0
Valid votes	348,193	99.38	+0.63		
Invalid votes	2,169	0.62	−0.63		
Votes cast / turnout	350,362	68.53	+0.27		
Abstentions	160,863	31.47	−0.27		
Registered voters	511,225				
Sources
Footnotes: ^{1} Sum Navarre results are compared to the combined totals of Navarrese People's Union, People's Party and Citizens–Party of the Citizenry in the 2015 election.

Popular vote
NA+	36.57%
PSN–PSOE	20.63%
GBai	17.32%
EH Bildu	14.54%
Podemos	4.74%
I–E (n)	3.01%
Vox	1.31%
Others	1.09%
Blank ballots	0.78%

Seats
NA+	40.00%
PSN–PSOE	22.00%
GBai	18.00%
EH Bildu	14.00%
Podemos	4.00%
I–E (n)	2.00%

== Aftermath ==
=== Government formation ===
Investiture; Nomination of María Chivite (PSN)
Ballot →	1 August 2019	2 August 2019
Required majority →	26 out of 50	Simple
Yes: • PSN (11); • GBai (9); • Podemos (2); • I–E (n) (1)	23 / 50	23 / 50
No: • NA+ (20); • EH Bildu (7) (2 on 2 Aug)	27 / 50	22 / 50
Abstentions: • EH Bildu (5) (on 2 Aug)	0 / 50	5 / 50
Absentees	0 / 50	0 / 50

== Bibliography ==
- Ley Orgánica 13/1982, de 10 de agosto, de reintegración y amejoramiento del Régimen Foral de Navarra (Organic Law 13/1982). Official State Gazette (in Spanish). 10 August 1982 [version as of 28 October 2010]. BOE-A-1982-20824.
- Ley Orgánica 5/1985, de 19 de junio, del Régimen Electoral General (Organic Law 5/1985). Official State Gazette (in Spanish). 19 June 1985 [version as of 6 March 2019]. BOE-A-1985-11672.
- Ley Foral 16/1986, de 17 de noviembre, reguladora de las elecciones al Parlamento de Navarra (Foral Law 16/1986). Official State Gazette (in Spanish). 17 November 1986 [version as of 11 June 2004]. BOE-A-1987-1255.
- Ley Foral 14/2004, de 3 de diciembre, del Gobierno de Navarra y de su Presidente (Foral Law 14/2004). Official State Gazette (in Spanish). 3 December 2004 [version as of 14 March 2019]. BOE-A-2005-1576.
- Decreto Foral 7/2019, de 1 de abril, de la Presidenta de la Comunidad Foral de Navarra, de convocatoria de elecciones al Parlamento de Navarra (Foral Decree 7/2019). Official State Gazette (in Spanish). 1 April 2019. BOE-A-2019-4842.
