= 2015 Spanish regional elections =

- 22 March 2015; 24 May 2015; 27 September 2015

1,048 seats in the regional parliaments of Andalusia, Aragon, Asturias, Balearic Islands, Canary Islands, Cantabria, Castile and León, Castilla–La Mancha, Catalonia, Extremadura, La Rioja, Madrid, Murcia, Navarre and Valencian Community
Regional administrations by leading party in 2015
National parties
PSOE (7)
PP (5+2)
Regional parties
CDC (1)
EAJ/PNV (1)
CC (1)
PRC (1)
GBai (1)

Regional elections were held in Spain during 2015 to elect the regional parliaments of fourteen of the seventeen autonomous communities: Andalusia, Aragon, Asturias, the Balearic Islands, the Canary Islands, Cantabria, Castile and León, Castilla–La Mancha, Catalonia, Extremadura, La Rioja, Madrid, Murcia, Navarre and the Valencian Community. 1,048 of 1,198 seats in the regional parliaments were up for election. The elections were held on 24 May for most regions (concurrently with local elections all across the country), on 22 March in Andalusia and on 27 September in Catalonia.

The ruling People's Party (PP) suffered one of the harshest loss of votes for any party in the quadrennial regional elections, losing all of its absolute majorities and most of the regional administrations at stake, including notable PP strongholds such as the Valencian Community which it had held continuously since 1995. The Spanish Socialist Workers' Party (PSOE) was unable to capitalize on the PP backlash and kept losing votes from 2011. However, through post-election agreements with other left-wing parties it was able to recapture all of the regional governments it had lost four years previously, as well as gain the Valencian regional government.

The novelty of these elections was the irruption of two new parties: Podemos (Spanish: We can), a party founded in 2014 before the May European Parliament election, and Citizens (C's), a Catalan unionist party created in 2006 to run in the Parliament of Catalonia elections. Podemos obtained a strong third place, close to the two main parties in several regions and entering all regional parliaments—a first for any party aside from PP and PSOE—while C's placed fourth in most regions, being left out of regional assemblies in the Canary Islands, Castilla–La Mancha and Navarre.

== Election date ==
Determination of election day varied depending on the autonomous community. Typically, most autonomous communities held their elections on the fourth Sunday of May every four years, concurrently with nationwide local elections, while others had their own, separate electoral cycles. In some cases, regional presidents had the prerogative to dissolve parliament and call for extra elections at a different time, but newly elected assemblies were restricted to serving out what remained of their previous four year-terms without altering the period to their next ordinary election. In other cases—Andalusia (since 1994), Aragon (2007), the Balearic Islands (2007), the Basque Country (1981), Castile and León (2007), Catalonia (1985), Extremadura (2011), Galicia (1985), Navarre (2010) and the Valencian Community (2006)—the law granted regional presidents the power to call snap elections resulting in fresh four-year parliamentary terms.

== Regional governments ==
The following table lists party control in autonomous communities. Gains for a party are highlighted in that party's colour.

Election day	Region	Previous control	New control
22 March	Andalusia	Spanish Socialist Workers' Party (PSOE)	Spanish Socialist Workers' Party (PSOE)
24 May	Aragon	People's Party (PP)	Spanish Socialist Workers' Party (PSOE)
24 May	Asturias	Spanish Socialist Workers' Party (PSOE)	Spanish Socialist Workers' Party (PSOE)
24 May	Balearic Islands	People's Party (PP)	Spanish Socialist Workers' Party (PSOE)
24 May	Canary Islands	Canarian Coalition (CC)	Canarian Coalition (CC)
24 May	Cantabria	People's Party (PP)	Regionalist Party of Cantabria (PRC)
24 May	Castile and León	People's Party (PP)	People's Party (PP)
24 May	Castilla–La Mancha	People's Party (PP)	Spanish Socialist Workers' Party (PSOE)
24 May	Extremadura	People's Party (PP)	Spanish Socialist Workers' Party (PSOE)
24 May	La Rioja	People's Party (PP)	People's Party (PP)
24 May	Madrid	People's Party (PP)	People's Party (PP)
24 May	Murcia	People's Party (PP)	People's Party (PP)
24 May	Navarre	Navarrese People's Union (UPN)	Geroa Bai (GBai)
24 May	Valencian Community	People's Party (PP)	Spanish Socialist Workers' Party (PSOE)
27 September	Catalonia	Democratic Convergence of Catalonia (CDC)	Democratic Convergence of Catalonia (CDC)

== Summary by region ==
=== March (Andalusia) ===
Parties and alliances	Votes	%	±pp	Seats	+/−
PSOE–A	1,411,278	35.41	−4.15	47	±0
PP	1,065,685	26.74	−13.93	33	−17
Podemos	592,133	14.86	New	15	+15
C's	369,896	9.28	New	9	+9
IULV–CA	274,426	6.89	−4.46	5	−7
UPyD	76,839	1.93	−1.42	0	±0
PA	60,645	1.52	−0.99	0	±0
Others	89,514	2.25		0	±0
Blank ballots	54,717	1.37	+0.46		
Valid votes	3,985,133	98.98	−0.44		
Invalid votes	41,149	1.02	+0.44		
Votes cast / turnout	4,026,282	62.30	+1.52		
Registered voters	6,462,627				

=== May (13 regions) ===
==== Aragon ====
Parties and alliances	Votes	%	±pp	Seats	+/−
PP	183,654	27.50	−12.19	21	−9
PSOE	143,096	21.43	−7.59	18	−4
Podemos	137,325	20.56	New	14	+14
C's	62,907	9.42	New	5	+5
PAR	45,846	6.86	−2.29	6	−1
CHA	30,618	4.58	−3.65	2	−2
IU	28,184	4.22	−1.94	1	−3
Others	23,004	3.44		0	±0
Blank ballots	13,224	1.98	−1.21		
Valid votes	667,858	98.70	+0.20		
Invalid votes	8,796	1.30	−0.20		
Votes cast / turnout	676,654	66.33	−1.57		
Registered voters	1,020,106				

==== Asturias ====
Parties and alliances	Votes	%	±pp (Note: The preceding Asturian regional election was held on 25 March 2012.)	Seats	+/−
PSOE	143,851	26.48	−5.62	14	−3
PP	117,319	21.59	+0.06	11	+1
Podemos	103,571	19.06	New	9	+9
IU/IX	64,868	11.94	−1.83	5	±0
FAC	44,480	8.19	−16.61	3	−9
C's	38,687	7.12	New	3	+3
UPyD	4,358	0.80	−2.94	0	−1
Others	15,940	2.93		0	±0
Blank ballots	10,271	1.89	+0.46		
Valid votes	543,345	98.58	−0.57		
Invalid votes	7,847	1.42	+0.57		
Votes cast / turnout	551,192	55.79	+4.64		
Registered voters	988,057				

==== Balearic Islands ====
Parties and alliances	Votes	%	±pp	Seats	+/−
PP	123,183	28.52	−18.16	20	−15
PSIB–PSOE	81,798	18.94	−5.50	14	−4
Podemos/Podem	63,489	14.70	New	10	+10
Més	59,617	13.80	+5.19	6	+2
El Pi	34,237	7.93	+1.95	3	+3
C's	25,651	5.94	+5.74	2	+2
Guanyem	8,740	2.02	−1.49	0	±0
MpM	6,582	1.52	+0.48	3	+2
GxF+PSOE	2,006	0.46	+0.01	1	±0
Others	18,476	4.28		0	±0
Blank ballots	8,080	1.87	−1.05		
Valid votes	431,859	98.63	+0.22		
Invalid votes	5,979	1.37	−0.22		
Votes cast / turnout	437,838	57.13	−1.67		
Registered voters	766,383				

==== Canary Islands ====
Parties and alliances	Votes	%	±pp	Seats	+/−
PSOE	182,006	19.89	−1.09	15	±0
PP	170,129	18.59	−13.35	12	−9
CCa–PNC	166,979	18.25	−6.69	18	−3
Podemos	133,044	14.54	New	7	+7
NCa	93,634	10.23	+1.81	5	+3
C's	54,375	5.94	New	0	±0
Unidos	32,868	3.59	+1.66	0	−1
IUC–LV–UP–ALTER	20,155	2.20	−0.76	0	±0
PACMA	11,296	1.23	+0.93	0	±0
ASG	5,090	0.56	New	3	+3
Others	28,761	3.14		0	±0
Blank ballots	16,769	1.83	−0.93		
Valid votes	915,106	98.20	+0.89		
Invalid votes	16,770	1.80	−0.89		
Votes cast / turnout	931,876	56.09	−2.81		
Registered voters	1,661,494				

==== Cantabria ====
Parties and alliances	Votes	%	±pp	Seats	+/−
PP	105,944	32.58	−13.51	13	−7
PRC	97,185	29.89	+0.77	12	±0
PSOE	45,653	14.04	−2.32	5	−2
Podemos	28,895	8.89	New	3	+3
C's	22,552	6.94	New	2	+2
IU	8,246	2.54	−0.78	0	±0
Others	11,633	3.58		0	±0
Blank ballots	5,025	1.55	−0.61		
Valid votes	325,133	98.27	−0.03		
Invalid votes	5,735	1.73	+0.03		
Votes cast / turnout	330,868	66.23	−3.56		
Registered voters	499,596				

==== Castile and León ====
Parties and alliances	Votes	%	±pp	Seats	+/−
PP	514,301	37.73	−13.82	42	−11
PSOE	353,575	25.94	−3.74	25	−4
Podemos	165,475	12.14	New	10	+10
C's	139,954	10.27	+10.01	5	+5
IU–Equo	56,516	4.15	−0.72	1	±0
UPyD	19,597	1.44	−1.84	0	±0
UPL	19,176	1.41	−0.45	1	±0
Others	61,187	4.49		0	±0
Blank ballots	33,274	2.44	−0.84		
Valid votes	1,363,055	97.93	−0.16		
Invalid votes	28,742	2.07	+0.16		
Votes cast / turnout	1,391,797	64.67	−2.83		
Registered voters	2,151,993				

==== Castilla–La Mancha ====
Parties and alliances	Votes	%	±pp	Seats	+/−
PP	413,349	37.49	−10.62	16	−9
PSOE	398,104	36.11	−7.29	15	−9
Podemos	107,463	9.75	New	2	+2
C's	95,230	8.64	New	0	±0
Ganemos–LV–IU	34,230	3.10	−0.67	0	±0
Others	34,896	3.17		0	±0
Blank ballots	19,256	1.75	+0.08		
Valid votes	1,102,528	97.82	−0.87		
Invalid votes	24,619	2.18	+0.87		
Votes cast / turnout	1,127,147	71.50	−4.46		
Registered voters	1,576,351				

==== Extremadura ====
Parties and alliances	Votes	%	±pp	Seats	+/−
PSOE–SIEx	265,015	41.50	−1.95	30	±0
PP	236,266	37.00	−9.13	28	−4
Podemos	51,216	8.02	New	6	+6
C's	28,010	4.39	New	1	+1
Ganemos–IU–LV	27,122	4.25	−1.47	0	−3
eX	9,305	1.46	New	0	±0
Others	13,145	2.06		0	±0
Blank ballots	8,561	1.34	−0.07		
Valid votes	638,640	98.14	−0.51		
Invalid votes	12,134	1.86	+0.51		
Votes cast / turnout	650,774	71.40	−3.25		
Registered voters	911,433				

==== La Rioja ====
Parties and alliances	Votes	%	±pp	Seats	+/−
PP	63,094	38.62	−13.36	15	−5
PSOE	43,689	26.74	−3.59	10	−1
Podemos	18,319	11.21	New	4	+4
C's	17,042	10.43	New	4	+4
PR+	7,277	4.45	−0.98	0	−2
CR–IU–Equo	6,797	4.16	+0.46	0	±0
UPyD	2,005	1.23	−2.33	0	±0
Others	2,211	1.35		0	±0
Blank ballots	2,933	1.80	−0.92		
Valid votes	163,367	98.03	+0.05		
Invalid votes	3,282	1.97	−0.05		
Votes cast / turnout	166,649	67.29	−2.47		
Registered voters	247,663				

==== Madrid ====
Parties and alliances	Votes	%	±pp	Seats	+/−
PP	1,050,256	33.08	−18.65	48	−24
PSOE	807,385	25.43	−0.84	37	+1
Podemos	591,697	18.64	New	27	+27
C's	385,836	12.15	+11.99	17	+17
IUCM–LV	132,207	4.16	−5.47	0	−13
UPyD	64,643	2.04	−4.28	0	−8
Vox	37,491	1.18	New	0	±0
PACMA	32,228	1.02	+0.49	0	±0
Others	38,115	1.20		0	±0
Blank ballots	34,856	1.10	−1.29		
Valid votes	3,174,714	99.03	+0.71		
Invalid votes	31,217	0.97	−0.71		
Votes cast / turnout	3,205,931	65.69	−0.17		
Registered voters	4,880,495				

==== Murcia ====
Parties and alliances	Votes	%	±pp	Seats	+/−
PP	239,011	37.35	−21.44	22	−11
PSOE	153,231	23.95	+0.07	13	+2
Podemos	84,577	13.22	New	6	+6
C's	80,459	12.57	New	4	+4
GRM (IU–V–RM–CLI–AS)	30,761	4.81	−3.02	0	−1
UPyD	10,422	1.63	−2.87	0	±0
MCC	8,793	1.37	New	0	±0
CCD	6,772	1.06	New	0	±0
Others	15,809	2.47		0	±0
Blank ballots	10,057	1.57	−0.59		
Valid votes	639,892	98.00	−0.37		
Invalid votes	13,087	2.00	+0.37		
Votes cast / turnout	652,979	63.57	−4.34		
Registered voters	1,027,213				

==== Navarre ====
Parties and alliances	Votes	%	±pp	Seats	+/−
UPN	92,705	27.44	−7.04	15	−4
GBai	53,497	15.83	+0.42	9	+1
EH Bildu	48,166	14.25	+0.97	8	+1
Podemos	46,207	13.67	New	7	+7
PSN–PSOE	45,164	13.37	−2.48	7	−2
PP	13,289	3.93	−3.36	2	−2
I–E	12,482	3.69	−2.02	2	−1
C's	9,993	2.96	New	0	±0
Others	9,782	2.89		0	±0
Blank ballots	6,610	1.96	−0.56		
Valid votes	337,895	98.75	−0.02		
Invalid votes	4,278	1.25	+0.02		
Votes cast / turnout	342,173	68.26	+0.83		
Registered voters	501,267				

==== Valencian Community ====
Parties and alliances	Votes	%	±pp	Seats	+/−
PP	658,612	26.61	−22.81	31	−24
PSPV–PSOE	509,098	20.57	−7.47	23	−10
Compromís	456,823	18.46	+11.27	19	+13
C's	309,121	12.49	New	13	+13
Podemos	282,389	11.41	New	13	+13
AC (EUPV–EV–ERPV–AS)	106,917	4.32	−3.33	0	−5
UPyD	28,754	1.16	−1.32	0	±0
Others	89,461	3.61		0	±0
Blank ballots	34,083	1.38	−1.10		
Valid votes	2,475,258	98.60	+0.23		
Invalid votes	35,201	1.40	−0.23		
Votes cast / turnout	2,510,459	69.56	−0.63		
Registered voters	3,609,265				

=== September (Catalonia) ===
Parties and alliances	Votes	%	±pp	Seats	+/−
JxSí	1,628,714	39.59	−4.82	62	−9
C's	736,364	17.90	+10.33	25	+16
PSC–PSOE	523,283	12.72	−1.67	16	−4
CatSíqueesPot	367,613	8.94	−0.96	11	−2
PP	349,193	8.49	−4.49	11	−8
CUP	337,794	8.21	+4.73	10	+7
unio.cat	103,293	2.51	New	0	±0
Others	46,095	1.12		0	±0
Blank ballots	21,895	0.53	−0.93		
Valid votes	4,114,244	99.61	+0.51		
Invalid votes	15,952	0.39	−0.51		
Votes cast / turnout	4,130,196	74.95	+7.19		
Registered voters	5,510,853				

== Bibliography ==
- Ley Orgánica 5/1985, de 19 de junio, del Régimen Electoral General (Organic Law 5/1985). Official State Gazette (in Spanish). 19 June 1985 [version as of 31 March 2015]. BOE-A-1985-11672.
