= Cristina Ibarrola =

Spanish politician (born 1969)

President of the Navarrese People's Union
- Incumbent
- Assumed office 28 April 2024
- Preceded by: Javier Esparza

Mayor of Pamplona
- In office 17 June 2023 – 28 December 2023
- Preceded by: Enrique Maya
- Succeeded by: Joseba Asirón

Personal details
- Born: 3 June 1969 (age 57)
- Party: Navarrese People's Union

Cristina Ibarrola Guillén (born 3 June 1969) is a Spanish politician serving as president of the Navarrese People's Union since 2024. From 2019 to 2023, she was a member of the Parliament of Navarre. From June to December 2023, she served as mayor of Pamplona.
