= Uxue Barkos =

Spanish politician and journalist

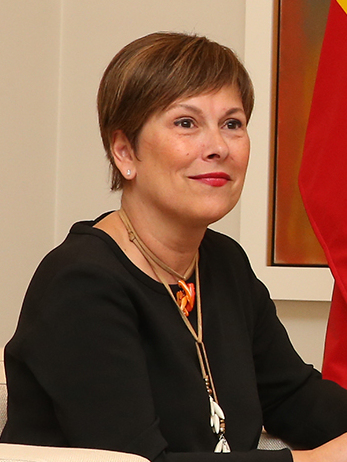

9th President of the Government of Navarre
- In office 20 July 2015 – 6 August 2019
- Preceded by: Yolanda Barcina
- Succeeded by: María Chivite

Member of the Parliament of Navarre
- Incumbent
- Assumed office 17 June 2015

Member of the Senate
- Incumbent
- Assumed office 17 August 2023
- Constituency: Navarre

Member of the Congress of Deputies
- In office 14 April 2004 – 1 June 2015
- Constituency: Navarre

Member of the Pamplona City Council
- In office 16 June 2007 – 13 June 2015

Personal details
- Born: Miren Uxue Barkos Berruezo; 5 July 1964 (age 62) Pamplona, Navarre, Spain
- Party: Geroa Bai (2011–present); Geroa Socialverdes (2020–present)
- Other political affiliations: Zabaltzen (2011–present); Nafarroa Bai (2004–2011)
- Spouse: Jesús González
- Children: 1
- Education: University of Navarra

Miren Uxue Barkos Berruezo (born 5 July 1964), simply known as Uxue Barkos, is a Spanish journalist and politician who served as the President of Navarre from 2015 to 2019. She previously represented the Basque nationalist coalition Geroa Bai (Basque for Yes to the Future), and before that, Nafarroa Bai (Basque for Yes to Navarre), in the Spanish Congress of Deputies.

== Career in journalism ==
Barkos graduated in Information Sciences at the University of Navarra. She worked as a newsreader on Spanish National Radio (Radio Nacional de España) and for Televisión Española, the state-run television station. She also worked for the newspaper Navarra Hoy and from 1990 onwards for the main Basque broadcaster Euskal Telebista as newsreader and Madrid correspondent.

== Congress of Deputies ==
In 2004, in order to maximise the Basque vote, the individual parties Aralar, Eusko Alkartasuna (Basque Solidarity), Batzarre and the Basque Nationalist Party agreed to form the coalition Yes to Navarre (Nafarroa Bai) to contest the Navarre constituency, an area where Basque nationalism had historically been weakest. Barkos, who was not a member of any of the parties, was selected to head the list at the 2004 Spanish General Election. The list polled 17.98%, which represented the highest vote share for any Basque list in the constituency since democracy was restored in 1977. In Congress she worked to promote Basque language and culture in Navarre, although she was criticised by Batasuna, which was not part of the NB coalition. In Congress she was also a member of the Commission which investigated the 2004 Madrid train bombings.

At the 2008 Spanish General Election, Barkos retained her seat with a slightly better result (18.53%).

In 2011, Barkos and independents affiliated with the Yes to Navarre coalition founded a new political group Zabaltzen under her leadership, in order to strengthen the coalition after Batzarre and Eusko Alkartasuna left, and Aralar decided to join Amaiur. Aralar prevented the rest of members from continuing to use Nafarroa Bai as a name; Zabaltzen, the Basque Nationalist Party and the newly incorporated Atarrabia Taldea contested the 2011 Spanish General Election as Geroa Bai (Yes to the Future). Barkos retained her seat, polling 12,84%.

== Pamplona City Council ==
Barkos was Nafarroa Bai's candidate for Mayor of Pamplona at the 2007 local elections, obtaining 28.851 votes (26.26%) and 8 city councillors out of 27. Yolanda Barcina from Navarrese People's Union was invested mayor by the City Council.

Barkos acted as Nafarroa Bai's spokesperson in the City Council; in 2008, it was her turn to set the chupinazo off to mark the beginning of the popular San Fermín festival. In the 2011 local elections, Barkos retained her seat as councillor and her position as Nafarroa Bai's spokesperson; Enrique Maya from Navarrese People's Union was invested mayor by the City Council.

== President of Navarre ==
In September 2015, she was announced as Geroa Bai's candidate for President of Navarre. After the 2015 regional election, she was invested President of Navarre on 20 June 2015 thanks to the support of the regional parliament members of Geroa Bai (9), EH Bildu (8), Podemos (7) and Izquierda-Ezkerra (2), gaining the necessary majority (26 out of 50).
