= Contigo Navarra =

Contigo Navarra Zurekin Nafarroa
- Leader: Begoña Alfaro
- Founded: 2 July 2022
- Ideology: Democratic socialism Left-wing populism Federalism; Republicanism
- Political position: Left-wing
- Parliament of Navarre: 3 / 50

Website
- contigonavarra.com

Contigo Navarra (Basque: Zurekin Nafarroa, lit. 'With You, Navarre' or 'Navarre With You') is an electoral alliance for the 2023 regional and local elections in Navarre, Spain, formed by Podemos, United Left of Navarre (IUN/NEB) and Assembly (Batzarre). In December 2022, Green Alliance (AV) joined the coalition.

== Composition ==
The following parties joined the coalition ahead of the 2023 regional election in Navarre.

Party
Podemos (Podemos/Ahal Dugu)
United Left of Navarre (IUN/NEB)
Assembly (Batzarre)
Green Alliance (AV)
Greens Equo (Equo)

== Election results ==
Parliament of Navarre
Election	Votes	%	Seats	+/–	Leading candidate	Government
2023	20,095	6.10 (#6)	3 / 50	0 (Note: Compared to the Podemos and Izquierda-Ezkerra totals in the 2019 regional election.)	Begoña Alfaro	Coalition
