= Carlos García Adanero =

Spanish politician (born 1967)

Member of the Congress of Deputies
- Incumbent
- Assumed office 21 May 2019
- Constituency: Navarre (2019–2023); Madrid (2023–present)

Personal details
- Born: 7 February 1967 (age 59)
- Party: PP (since 2024)
- Other political affiliations: UPN (1986–2022)

Carlos García Adanero (born 7 February 1967) is a Spanish politician serving as a member of the Congress of Deputies since 2019. From 1991 to 2019, he was a member of the Parliament of Navarre.
