= Zabaltzen =

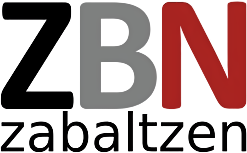
- President: Ana Ansa
- Secretary-General: Mikel Aramburu
- Founded: 1 September 2011
- Youth wing: Zabaltzen Gaztea
- Ideology: Basque nationalism Separatism; Social democracy Republicanism; Secularism
- Political position: Centre-left to left-wing
- National affiliation: Geroa Bai (since 2011)

Website
- www.zabaltzen.net

Zabaltzen (lit. 'Expanding' or 'Spreading') is a political organization formed in the Chartered Community of Navarre in 2011.

== History ==
Zabaltzen was created in 2011 by ex-members of Eusko Alkartasuna and Aralar, that opposed the merge of those parties in Bildu, and supported continuing in Nafarroa Bai. Zabaltzen participated in the creation of Geroa Bai in 2012.
