= Geroa Socialverdes =

- Leader: Uxue Barkos
- Founded: 22 September 2020
- Ideology: Basque nationalism Progressivism; Eco-socialism; Europeanism
- Political position: Centre-left to left-wing
- Regional affiliation: Geroa Bai
- Parliament of Navarre: 5 / 50

Website
- www.geroasocialverdes.eu

Geroa Socialverdes (English: "Future Social Greens"), officially Geroa Socialverdes de Navarra en Europa/Nafarroako Sozialberdeak Europan (English: "Future Social Greens of Navarre in Europe", GSB/GSV) is a regional party based in Navarre founded in September 2020 by former president of Navarre Uxue Barkos and integrated within the Geroa Bai coalition.
