= Izquierda-Ezkerra =

Left Izquierda-Ezkerra
- Leader: José Miguel Nuin
- Founded: 29 January 2011
- Dissolved: 4 April 2023
- Merged into: Contigo Navarra
- Headquarters: Pamplona
- Ideology: Socialism; Communism
- Political position: Left-wing to far-left
- National affiliation: Cambio-Aldaketa; Unidas Podemos
- Colours: Purple
- Members: See list of members

Website
- www.izquierda-ezkerra.org

Izquierda-Ezkerra (English: "Left", I–E (n)) was an electoral alliance in Navarre formed by United Left of Navarre (IUN) and Batzarre. It was established in January 2011 after Batzarre split from the Nafarroa Bai coalition. Batzarre accepted IUN's call to form a coalition along with Socialist local figures—the Plataforma Navarra por el Cambio—disgruntled with the Socialist Party's social policies and standing support to the conservative anti-Basque Unión del Pueblo Navarro (UPN). The Los Verdes-Grupo Verde ecologists joined them too.

In the elections to the Parliament of Navarre held on 22 May 2011, the coalition won three seats and 5.70% of the valid votes. The coalition defended an approach of "inclusion and coexistence", as opposed to exclusion and confrontational attitudes. The party also advocated for an alliance of leftist forces of Navarre and an end to UPN's on-off decades long tenure in office, as well as an understanding with leftist Basque nationalist parties. Its main strongholds lied in Pamplona and Tudela where it held the mayoralty between 2015 and 2019.

Ahead of the 2023 Navarrese regional election, IUN and Batzarre joined Contigo Navarra, a coalition with Podemos and other ecologist parties, thus effectively dissolving I–E (n).

== Composition ==
Party
United Left of Navarre (IUN/NEB)
Assembly (Batzarre)

== Electoral performance ==
=== Parliament of Navarre ===
Parliament of Navarre
Election	Leading candidate	Votes	%	Seats	+/–	Government
2011	José Miguel Nuin	18,457	5.71 (#6)	3 / 50	1 (Note: Compared to United Left of Navarre totals in the 2007 regional election.)	Opposition
2015	José Miguel Nuin	12,482	3.69 (#7)	2 / 50	1	Coalition
2019	Marisa de Simón	10,472	3.01 (#6)	1 / 50	1	External support

=== Cortes Generales ===
Election	Navarre					
Election	Congress				Senate	
Election	Votes	%	Seats	+/–	Seats	+/–
2011	18,251	5.51 (#5)	0 / 5	0 (Note: Compared to United Left of Navarre totals in the 2008 general election.)	0 / 4	0
2015	14,528	4.11 (#7)	0 / 5	0	0 / 4	0
2016	Within Unidos Podemos		0 / 5	0	1 / 4	1
2019	Within Unidas Podemos		0 / 5	0	0 / 4	1
