= Geroa Bai =

Yes to the Future Geroa Bai
- Leader: Uxue Barkos
- Founded: 30 September 2011
- Preceded by: Nafarroa Bai
- Youth wing: Gazteok Bai
- Ideology: Basque nationalism Progressivism; Regionalism; Social democracy Factions: Environmentalism; Christian democracy Liberalism; Agrarianism
- Political position: Centre-left
- National affiliation: Confederal Left (Note: In the Senate.); CEUS (since 2019); Cambio-Aldaketa (2015–2016; 2019)
- Colours: Red
- Congress of Deputies (Navarre seats): 0 / 5
- Senate (Navarre seats): 1 / 5
- European Parliament (Spanish seats): 0 / 61
- Parliament of Navarre: 7 / 50
- Mayors: 3 / 272
- Town councillors: 59 / 1,889

Website
- geroabai.com

Geroa Bai (English: Yes to the Future) is a regional political coalition in the Chartered Community of Navarre, created for the 2011 election to the Cortes Generales. It includes the Basque Nationalist Party (EAJ-PNV), Atarrabia Taldea, and the Geroa Socialverdes partnership. These groups had shared the former coalition Nafarroa Bai, along with Eusko Alkartasuna and Aralar (which entered the coalition Amaiur, and later EH Bildu), and Batzarre (which entered the coalition Izquierda-Ezkerra).

== History ==
Geroa Bai elected one representative to the Congress of Deputies in the general elections held in 2011 (Uxue Barkos, who had been the representative of Nafarroa Bai in her previous term). Geroa Bai holds 9 seats in the much fragmented Parliament of Navarre since 2015. Since July 2015, Uxue Barkos (Geroa Bai) presides the regional government of Navarre relying also on EH Bildu, Podemos and Izquierda-Ezkerra.

== Composition ==
Party	Notes
Expanding (Zabaltzen)	
Atarrabia Taldea (AT)	
Basque Nationalist Party (EAJ/PNV)	
Future Social Greens (GSB/GSV)	Founded in September 2020.

== Electoral performance ==
=== Parliament of Navarre ===
Parliament of Navarre
Election	Leading candidate	Votes	%	Seats	+/–	Government
2015	Uxue Barkos	53,497	15.83 (#2)	9 / 50	1 (Note: Compared to NaBai 2011 totals in the 2011 regional election.)	Coalition
2019	Uxue Barkos	60,323	17.32 (#3)	9 / 50	0	Coalition
2023	Uxue Barkos	43,660	13.23 (#4)	7 / 50	2	Coalition

=== Cortes Generales ===
==== Nationwide ====
Cortes Generales
Election	Congress					Senate		Leading candidate	Status in legislature
Election	Votes	%	#	Seats	+/–	Seats	+/–	Leading candidate	Status in legislature
2011	42,415	0.17%	19th	1 / 350	0	0 / 208	0	Uxue Barkos	Opposition
2015	30,642	0.12%	19th	0 / 350	1	1 / 208	1	Koldo Martínez	No seats
2016	14,343	0.06%	16th	0 / 350	0	0 / 208	1	Daniel Innerarity	No seats
2019 (Apr)	22,309	0.09%	21st	0 / 350	0	0 / 208	0	Koldo Martínez	No seats
2019 (Nov)	12,709	0.05%	24th	0 / 350	0	0 / 208	0	Koldo Martínez	No seats

==== Regional breakdown ====
Election	Navarre						
Election	Congress					Senate	
Election	Votes	%	#	Seats	+/–	Seats	+/–
2011	42,415	12.81%	4th	1 / 5	0	0 / 4	0
2015	30,642	8.67%	5th	0 / 5	1	1 / 4	1 (Note: The Senate seat in 2015 was elected within the Cambio-Aldaketa alliance.)
2016	14,343	4.28%	6th	0 / 5	0	0 / 4	1
2019 (Apr)	22,309	6.08%	5th	0 / 5	0	0 / 4	0
2019 (Nov)	12,709	3.79%	6th	0 / 5	0	0 / 4	0

=== European Parliament ===
European Parliament
Election	Total					Navarre		
Election	Votes	%	#	Seats	+/–	Votes	%	#
2019	Within CEUS			0 / 59	0	27,202	7.99%	5th
2024	Within CEUS			0 / 61	0	8,272	3.17%	7th
