= Navarra Suma =

Sum Navarre Navarra Suma
- Spokesperson: Javier Esparza
- Founded: 11 March 2019
- Dissolved: 15 August 2022
- Headquarters: Pl. Príncipe de Viana, 1, 4º 31002, Pamplona
- Ideology: Regionalism; Christian democracy; Conservatism; Liberalism
- Political position: Centre-right to right-wing
- Colors: Grey (customary); Red; White
- Members: See list of members

Website
- www.navarrasuma.es

Navarra Suma (English: "Sum Navarre", NA+) was an electoral alliance in Navarre formed by Navarrese People's Union (UPN), Citizens (Cs) and the People's Party (PP) ahead of the April 2019 Spanish general election and kept for the May 2019 local and regional elections. The goal of the three parties was to create a broad coalition of anti-nationalist centre-right forces in Navarre.

NA+ was noted for its success in consolidating the vote of the centre-right to right-wing in Navarre as well as mitigating the rise of Vox, but at the cost of hindering chances for any agreement between UPN and the Socialist Party of Navarre (PSN) that would have allowed it to return to government.

== History ==
The alliance had its precedent in the 2015 Navarrese regional and Spanish local elections, where the Navarrese People's Union (UPN), the People's Party (PP) and Citizens (Cs) had run separately, leading to significant vote splitting within the centre-left to right-wing political spectrum that favoured the election of left-wing governments both at the regional and the local level, including the loss of Pamplona to an EH Bildu's controlled council. This circumstance was seemingly about to be repeated in the upcoming 2019 regional, local and, eventually, April general elections, with the aggravating circumstance of a fourth party gaining strength within the far-right side of the spectrum: Vox.

After several months of speculation on whether UPN and PP would renew their traditional general election alliance, an agreement was reached on 2 March 2019 whereby the PP would fully respect UPN's condition of seeking to "maintain an autonomous voice in Madrid". Throughout the next week, it was unveiled that UPN had entered talks with Cs to form a three-way alliance comprising all three elections—general, regional and local—with the decision being approved by the parties on 10 March and officially signed by UPN and Cs leaders, Javier Esparza and Albert Rivera, on the next day. The overall agreement was formally presented as an alliance between UPN and Cs, with the former integrating some PP members within its reserved posts in the coalition's lists, by virtue of the previous agreement between the two parties. UPN explicitly excluded Vox from the alliance on the basis that its purpose was to avoid vote splitting between three similarly aligned parties, hinting that Vox's political strategies were distinct enough to their own.

On 20 March, the coalition partners announced the imagery and the party lists for the Congress and Senate, including the announcement of their electoral label, "Sum Navarre" (Spanish: Navarra Suma). UPN was to be reserved four out of the five candidates in the Congress list—namely, numbers 1, 2, 3 and 5, with the latter two being awarded by UPN to PP candidates—whereas the remaining post would be allocated to Cs; in exchange, the latter would lead the Senate list, with UPN comprising the other two posts.

In the 26 May elections, the coalition was the most-voted political force in Navarre by securing over 36% of the vote and 20 seats, as well as being able to regain control of the five largest cities in the region—Pamplona, Tudela, Egüés, Barañain and Burlada—however, it ultimately failed in forming the regional government and remained in opposition. Nonetheless, the positive results achieved by the electoral platform in the Navarrese regional and local elections provided the inspiration for Spanish PP leader Pablo Casado to put forward a similar alliance proposition ahead of the November 2019 general election, including a participation or support of Vox, but the proposal failed to materialize over Cs's refusal to it. The Navarra Suma alliance was, nonetheless, maintained for the November election.

== Composition ==
Party
Navarrese People's Union (UPN)
Citizens–Party of the Citizenry (Cs)
People's Party (PP)

== Electoral performance ==
=== Parliament of Navarre ===
Parliament of Navarre
Election	Leading candidate	Votes	%	Seats	+/–	Government
2019	Javier Esparza	127,346	36.57 (#1)	20 / 50	3 (Note: Compared to the combined totals of UPN and PP in the 2015 regional election.)	Opposition

=== Cortes Generales ===
==== Nationwide ====
Cortes Generales
Election	Congress					Senate		Leading candidate	Status in legislature
Election	Votes	%	#	Seats	+/–	Seats	+/–	Leading candidate	Status in legislature
2019 (Apr)	107,619	0.41%	14th	2 / 350	0 (Note: Compared to Navarrese People's Union–People's Party totals in the 2016 general election.)	3 / 208	0	Sergio Sayas	New election
2019 (Nov)	99,078	0.41%	15th	2 / 350	0	3 / 208	0	Sergio Sayas	Opposition

==== Regional breakdown ====
Election	Navarre									
Election	Congress					Senate				
Election	Votes	%	#	Seats	+/–	Votes		%	Seats	+/–
2019 (Apr)	107,619	29.32%	1st	2 / 5	0	Ruth Goñi Sarries; Alberto Catalán Higueras; Amelia Salanueva Murguialday	110,323; 107,796; 107,186	30.73% 30.02% 29.85%	3 / 4	0
2019 (Nov)	99,078	29.58%	1st	2 / 5	0	Amelia Salanueva Murguialday; Ruth Goñi Sarries; Alberto Catalán Higueras	104,424; 102,988; 101,945	31.63% 31.19% 30.88%	3 / 4	0
