= Batzarre =

- Leader: Milagros Rubio
- Founded: 1987
- Merger of: Euskadiko Mugimendu Komunista; Liga Komunista Iraultzailea
- Youth wing: Batzarre Gazteak
- Membership (2016): ▲541
- Ideology: Abertzale left
- Political position: Left-wing to far-left
- National affiliation: Plural Left (2011–2015); Unidas Podemos (2016–2023); Sumar (2023–2026); Broad Front (since 2026); Senate of Progress (since 2026) (Note: In the Senate)
- Regional affiliation: Euskal Herritarrok (1998–2000); Nafarroa Bai (2004–2011); Izquierda-Ezkerra (2011–2023); Contigo Navarra (2023–present)
- Parliament of Navarre: 0 / 50 Inside Contigo Navarra

Website
- www.batzarre.org

Batzarre (English: Assembly) is a political party in Navarre, Spain. It has a branch in the Basque Autonomous Community known as Zutik. It bids to win the political space to the left of the Basque nationalists and the Spanish socialists, the latter eroded for their long-running collusion with the conservative UPN government. It formed on 29 January 2011 the coalition Izquierda-Ezkerra along with Izquierda Unida de Navarra (IUN) and local Socialist figures disillusioned with the party's regional alliances.

== History ==
It formed out of the merger of EMK and LKI, the Basque branch of LCR. It started as a list of candidates in 1987 for the Navarrese Parliament election. In 1991, the party was formally established. It supported Herri Batasuna several times, e.g. in the 1989 Spanish general election, and in the European Parliament election, 1987 and 1989. In 1998, the party was one of the members of Euskal Herritarrok; however, it left the coalition after ETA broke the 1998 truce.

In 2004, Batzarre was one of the founding parties of the coalition Nafarroa Bai (Yes to Navarre), who earned them a seat in the Parliament of Navarre, held by Ioseba Eceolaza. However, internal frictions paved the way to the 2011 break-up of the coalition, and the establishment of a new progressive coalition, Izquierda-Ezkerra.

== Electoral performance ==
=== Parliament of Navarre ===
Date	Votes			Seats		Status	Size
Date	#	%	±pp	#	±	Status	Size
1987	5,880	2.1%	—	0 / 50	—	N/A	9th
1991	6,543	2.4%	+0.3	0 / 50	0	N/A	6th
1995	6,509	2.2%	–0.2	0 / 50	0	N/A	7th
1999	47,271	15.6%	N/A	1 / 50	1	Opposition	*
2003	7,873	2.6%	N/A	0 / 50	1	N/A	7th
2007	77,872	23.6%	N/A	1 / 50	1	Opposition	**
2011	18,457	5.7%	N/A	1 / 50	0	Opposition	***
2015	12,482	3.7%	–2.0	0 / 50	1	N/A	***
2019	10,472	3.0%	–0.7	0 / 50	0	N/A	***

- * Within Basque Citizens.
- ** Within Navarre Yes.
- *** Within Left.
