= Parliament of Navarre =

Legislative organization in Spain

Parliament of Navarre Nafarroako Parlamentua Parlamento de Navarra
- 11th Parliament of Navarre

Type
- Type: Spanish regional legislature
- Houses: Unicameral

Leadership
- President: Unai Hualde, Geroa Bai since 19 June 2019
- First Vice President: Ainhoa Unzu, PSN since 16 June 2023
- Second Vice President: Juan Sánchez, UPN since 16 June 2023
- First Secretary: Yolanda Ibáñez, UPN since 16 June 2023
- Second Secretary: Mikel Zabaleta, EH Bildu since 16 June 2023

Structure
- Seats: 50
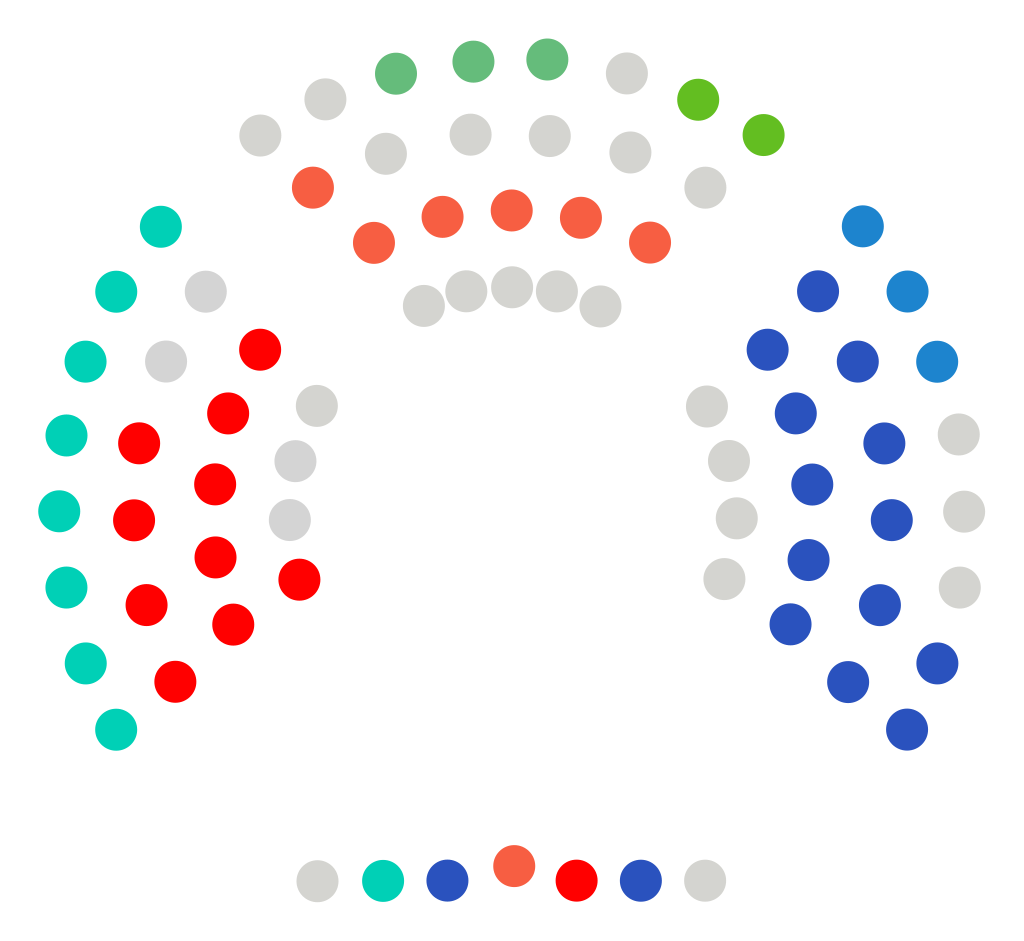
- Political groups: Government (21): PSN–PSOE (11); GBai (7) (Note: GSB/GSV (5); EAJ/PNV (2)); C/Z (3) (Note: Podemos (2); IUN/NEB (1)); Opposition (29): UPN (15); EH Bildu (9); PP (3); Vox (1); Independent (1)

Elections
- Last election: 28 May 2023

Meeting place
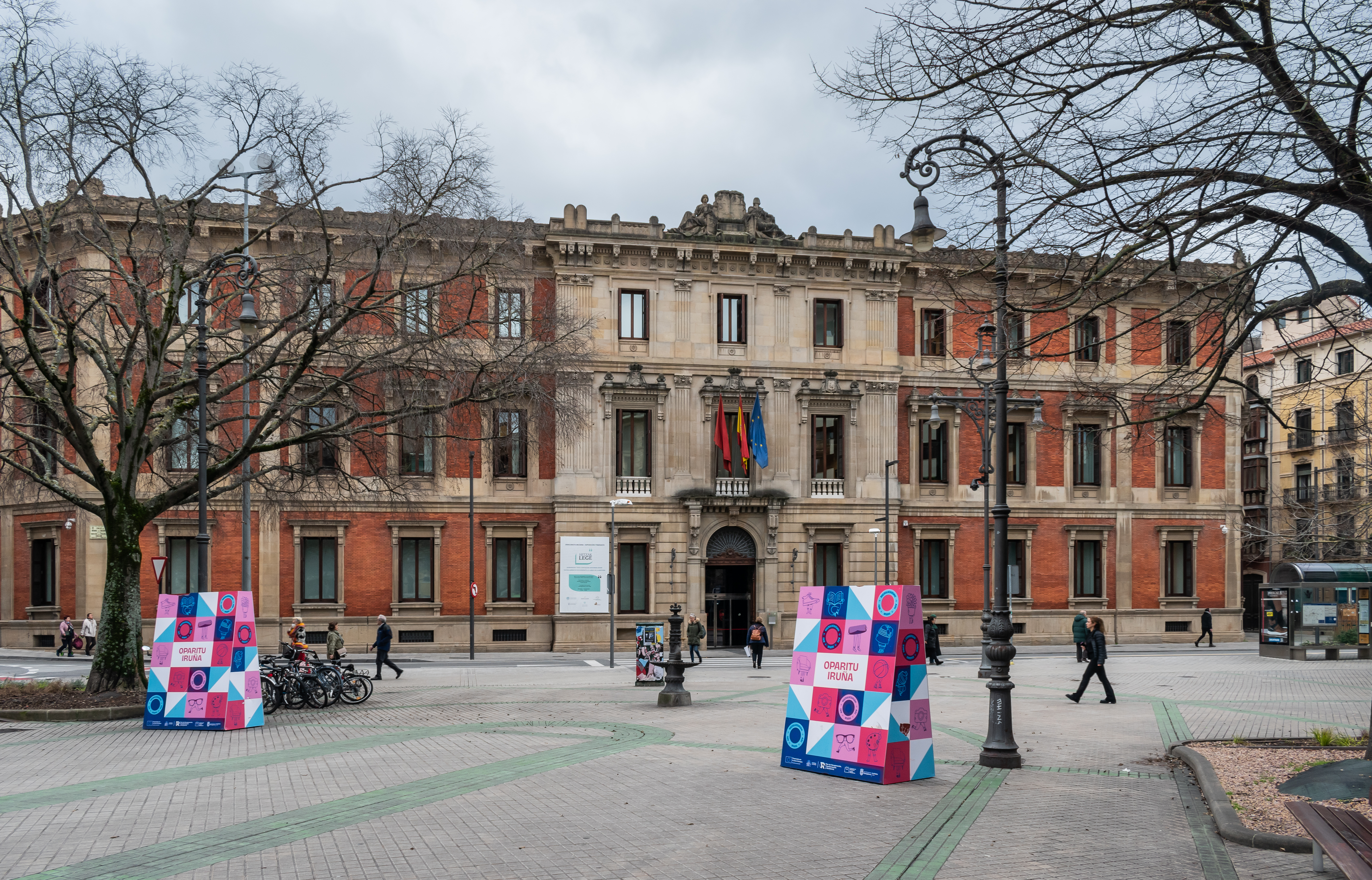
- Pamplona, Navarre

Website
- www.parlamentodenavarra.es

The Parliament of Navarre (Spanish: Parlamento de Navarra, Basque: Nafarroako Parlamentua) or also known as Cortes de Navarra (in Spanish) or Nafarroako Gorteak (in Basque) is the Navarre autonomous unicameral parliament.

== Functions ==
The Parliament's functions are regulated by the "Organic Law on the Reintegration and Improvement of the Autonomous Regime in Navarre" (Ley Orgánica de Reintegración y Amejoramiento del Régimen Foral de Navarra, also known as LORAFNA). These functions include representing the Navarre people, approving the laws and General Budget and electing and controlling the President, as in any other parliamentary system.

== Structure and distribution ==
Currently, the Parliament is composed by 50 members. The chamber's size can be set by law between 40 and 70. Representatives are elected directly for four-year terms and all renewed simultaneously.

=== Results of the elections to the Parliament of Navarre ===
Deputies in the Parliament of Navarre since 1979
Key to parties HB UNAI AMAIUR IU EH Aralar PC EE EH Bildu EH Bildu I–E (n) Podemos/Ahal Dugu Contigo/Zurekin NaBai GBai PSN EA PNV–EE–ESEI EAJ/PNV PNV–EA IFN UCD CDS AP–PDP–UL CDN UDF UPN NA+ PP AP Vox
Election	Distribution	President
1979	9 / 1 / 1 / 7 / 15 / 3 / 1 / 20 / 13	Jaime Ignacio del Burgo (UCD)
1979	9 / 1 / 1 / 7 / 15 / 3 / 1 / 20 / 13	Juan Manuel Arza (UCD)
1979	9 / 1 / 1 / 7 / 15 / 3 / 1 / 20 / 13	Jaime Ignacio del Burgo (UCD)
1983	6 / 20 / 3 / 8 / 13	Gabriel Urralburu (PSN)
1987	7 / 1 / 15 / 4 / 4 / 3 / 14 / 2	Gabriel Urralburu (PSN)
1991	6 / 2 / 19 / 3 / 20	Juan Cruz Alli (UPN)
1995	5 / 5 / 11 / 2 / 10 / 17	Javier Otano (PSN)
1995	5 / 5 / 11 / 2 / 10 / 17	Miguel Sanz (UPN)
1999	8 / 3 / 11 / 3 / 3 / 22	Miguel Sanz (UPN)
2003	4 / 4 / 11 / 4 / 4 / 23	Miguel Sanz (UPN)
2007	2 / 12 / 12 / 2 / 22	Miguel Sanz (UPN)
2011	7 / 3 / 8 / 9 / 19 / 4	Yolanda Barcina (UPN)
2015	8 / 2 / 7 / 9 / 7 / 15 / 2	Uxue Barkos (GBai)
2019	7 / 1 / 2 / 9 / 11 / 20	María Chivite (PSN)
2023	9 / 3 / 7 / 11 / 15 / 3 / 2	María Chivite (PSN)

== See also ==
- List of presidents of the Parliament of Navarre
- General Assemblies (Basque Country)
