= People's Party of Navarre =

People's Party of Navarre Partido Popular de Navarra
- President: Ana Beltrán
- Secretary-General: Gabriel Pérez
- Founded: 1989; 2008
- Dissolved: 1991 (first incarnation)
- Headquarters: C/Carlos III nº 11, 1º dcha Pamplona, Navarre
- Ideology: Conservatism; Christian democracy Spanish unionism
- Political position: Centre-right to right-wing
- National affiliation: People's Party
- Regional affiliation: Navarra Suma (2019–2022)
- Parliament of Navarre: 3 / 50

Website
- www.ppnavarra.es

The People's Party of Navarre (Spanish: Partido Popular de Navarra, PP) is the regional section of the People's Party (PP) in Navarre. It was first formed in 1989 from the re-foundation of the People's Alliance, and in 1991 it was merged into the Navarrese People's Union (UPN). In 2008, after a crisis erupted between both parties, the PP choose to re-create their regional branch in the community.

== Electoral performance ==
=== Parliament of Navarre ===
Parliament of Navarre
Election	Vote	%	Score	Seats	+/–	Leader	Status
2011	23,551	7.3	5th	4 / 50	4	Santiago Cervera	Opposition
2015	13,289	3.9	6th	2 / 50	2	Ana Beltrán	Opposition
2023	23,080	7.2	5th	3 / 50	1	Javier García	Opposition
