= 2003 Navarrese regional election =

Election in the Spanish region of Navarre

- 25 May 2003

All 50 seats in the Parliament of Navarre 26 seats needed for a majority
- Opinion polls
- Registered: 464,826 ▲0.7%
- Turnout: 328,609 (70.7%) ▲4.5 pp
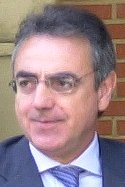

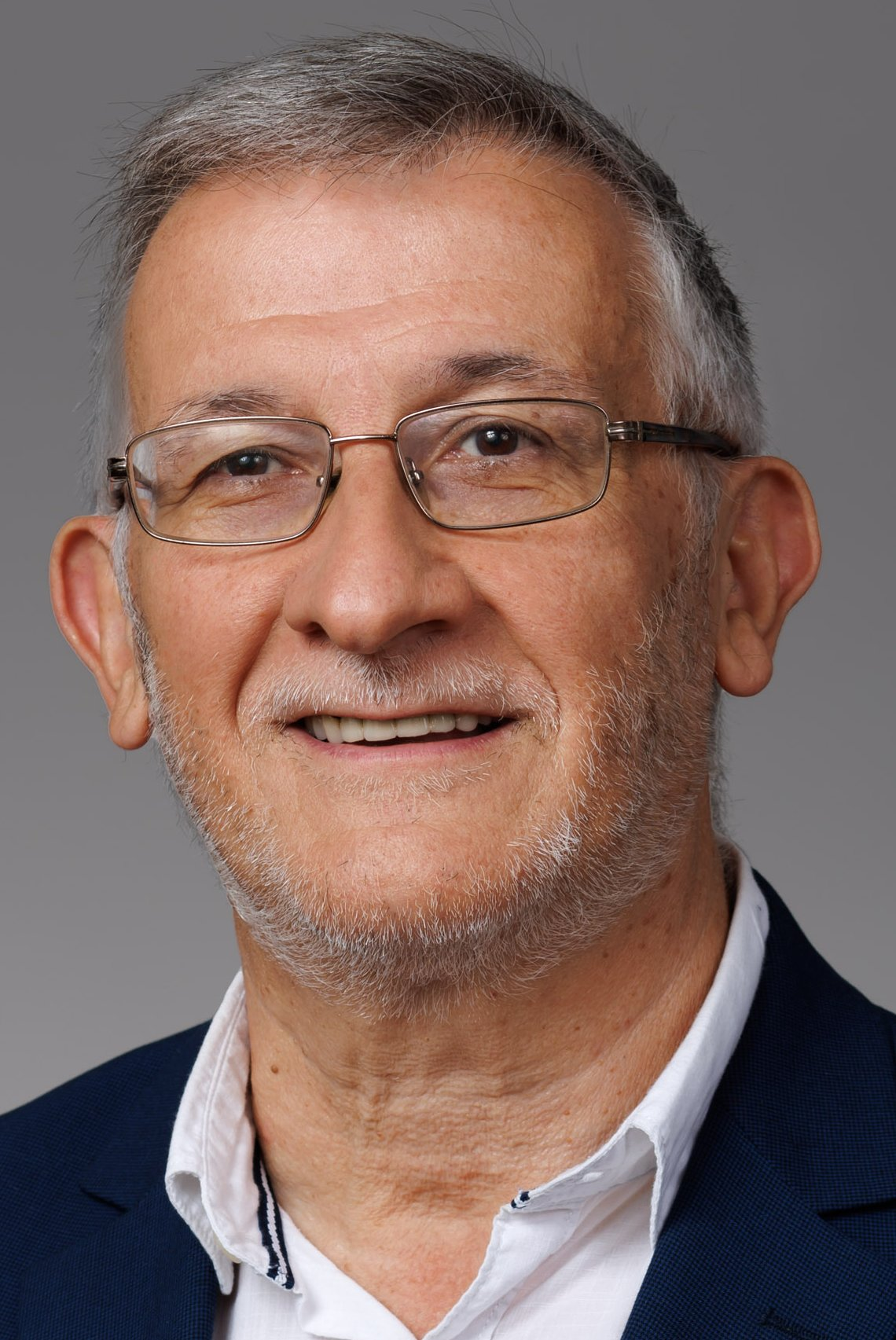

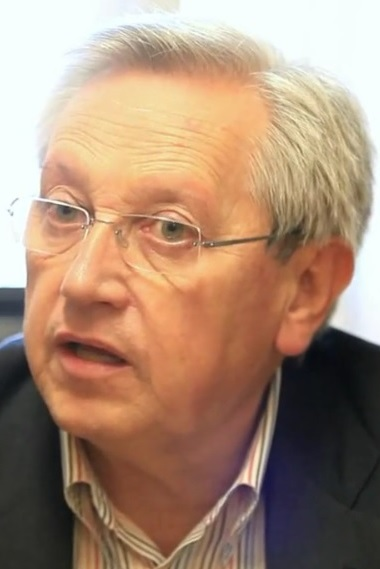

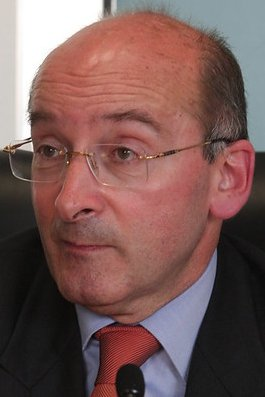

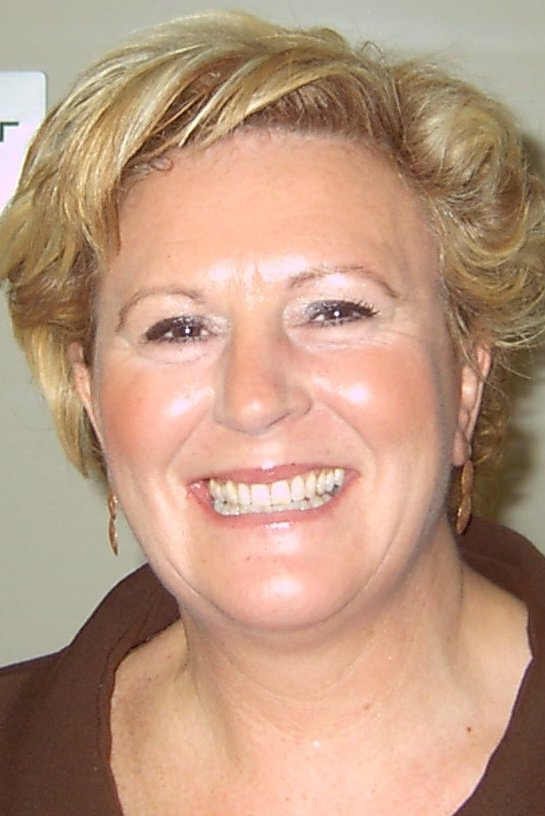
	First party	Second party	Third party
Leader	Miguel Sanz	Juan José Lizarbe	Félix Taberna
Party	UPN	PSN–PSOE	IUN/NEB
Leader since	17 January 1995	18 December 1997	1991
Last election	22 seats, 41.4%	11 seats, 20.3%	3 seats, 6.9%
Seats won	23	11	4
Seat change	▲1	0	▲1
Popular vote	127,460	65,003	26,962
Percentage	41.5%	21.2%	8.8%
Swing	▲0.1 pp	▲0.9 pp	▲1.9 pp
	Fourth party	Fifth party	Sixth party
Leader	Patxi Zabaleta	Juan Cruz Alli	Begoña Errazti
Party	Aralar	CDN	EA–PNV
Leader since	30 June 2001	10 April 1995	1995
Last election	Did not contest	3 seats, 6.9%	3 seats, 5.4%
Seats won	4	4	4
Seat change	▲4	▲1	▲1
Popular vote	24,068	23,516	22,824
Percentage	7.8%	7.7%	7.4%
Swing	New party	▲0.8 pp	▲2.0 pp
President before election
Miguel Sanz
UPN
President after election
Miguel Sanz
UPN

A regional election was held in Navarre on 25 May 2003 to elect the 6th Parliament of the chartered community. All 50 seats in the Parliament were up for election. It was held concurrently with regional elections in twelve other autonomous communities and local elections all across Spain.

== Overview ==
Under the 1982 Reintegration and Improvement of the Chartered Regime, the Parliament of Navarre was the unicameral legislature of the homonymous chartered community, having legislative power in devolved matters, as well as the ability to grant or withdraw confidence from a regional president. The electoral and procedural rules were supplemented by national law provisions.

=== Date ===
The term of the Parliament of Navarre expired four years after the date of its previous ordinary election, unless it was dissolved earlier. If no snap election was called before the last year of the legislative term, the election decree was required to be issued no later than 54 days before the scheduled election date and published on the following day in the Official Gazette of Navarre (BON), with election day taking place on the fourth Sunday of May four years after the previous election. The previous election was held on 13 June 1999, setting the latest possible date for election day on the fourth Sunday of May four years later, which was 25 May 2003.

Amendments in 2001 granted the regional president the prerogative to dissolve the Parliament of Navarre at any given time and call a snap election, provided that no motion of no confidence was in process, no nationwide election was due and some time requirements are met: namely, that dissolution did not occur either during the first legislative session or during the last year of parliament before its planned expiration, nor before one year after a previous one under this procedure. In the event of an investiture process failing to elect a regional president within a 30-day period from the first ballot, the Parliament was to be automatically dissolved and a fresh election called. Any snap election held as a result of these circumstances did not alter the date of the chamber's next ordinary election, with elected lawmakers serving the remainder of its original four-year term.

The election to the Parliament of Navarre was officially called on 1 April 2003 with the publication of the corresponding decree in the BON, setting election day for 25 May and scheduling for the chamber to reconvene on 18 June.

=== Electoral system ===
Voting for the Parliament was based on universal suffrage, comprising all Spanish nationals over 18 years of age, registered in Navarre and with full political rights, provided that they had not been deprived of the right to vote by a final sentence, nor were legally incapacitated.

The Parliament of Navarre had a minimum of 40 and a maximum of 60 seats, with electoral provisions fixing its size at 50. All were elected in a single multi-member constituency—corresponding to the chartered community's territory—using the D'Hondt method and closed-list proportional voting, with a three percent-threshold of valid votes (including blank ballots) regionally.

The law did not provide for by-elections to fill vacant seats; instead, any vacancies arising after the proclamation of candidates and during the legislative term were filled by the next candidates on the party lists or, when required, by designated substitutes.

== Parties and candidates ==
The electoral law allowed for parties and federations registered in the interior ministry, alliances and groupings of electors to present lists of candidates. Parties and federations intending to form a coalition ahead of an election were required to inform the relevant electoral commission within 10 days of the election call, whereas groupings of electors needed to secure the signature of at least one percent of the electorate in Navarre, disallowing electors from signing for more than one list.

Below is a list of the main parties and alliances which contested the election:

Candidacy	Parties and alliances	Leading candidate	Ideology	Previous result		Gov.	Ref.
Candidacy	Parties and alliances	Leading candidate	Ideology	Vote %	Seats	Gov.	Ref.
UPN	List: Navarrese People's Union (UPN)	Miguel Sanz	Conservatism; Christian democracy Regionalism	41.4%	22	Yes	
PSN–PSOE	List: Socialist Party of Navarre (PSN–PSOE)	Juan José Lizarbe	Social democracy	20.3%	11	No	
IUN/NEB	List: United Left of Navarre (IUN/NEB) – Communist Party of the Basque Country (PCE/EPK) – Revolutionary Workers' Party (POR) – Workers' Revolutionary Party–Revolutionary Left (PRT–IR)	Félix Taberna	Socialism; Communism	6.9%	3	No	
CDN	List: Convergence of Democrats of Navarre (CDN)	Juan Cruz Alli	Christian democracy Regionalism	6.9%	3	No	
EA–PNV	List: Basque Solidarity (EA); Basque Nationalist Party (EAJ/PNV)	Begoña Errazti	Basque nationalism Social democracy Christian democracy	5.4%	3	No	
Aralar	List: Aralar (Aralar)	Patxi Zabaleta	Basque nationalism Left-wing nationalism Socialism	—N/a		No	

== Opinion polls ==
The tables below list opinion polling results in reverse chronological order, showing the most recent first and using the dates when the survey fieldwork was done, as opposed to the date of publication. Where the fieldwork dates are unknown, the date of publication is given instead. The highest percentage figure in each polling survey is displayed with its background shaded in the leading party's colour. If a tie ensues, this is applied to the figures with the highest percentages. The "Lead" column on the right shows the percentage-point difference between the parties with the highest percentages in a poll.

=== Voting intention estimates ===
The table below lists weighted voting intention estimates. Refusals are generally excluded from the party vote percentages, while question wording and the treatment of "don't know" responses and those not intending to vote may vary between polling organisations. When available, seat projections determined by the polling organisations are displayed below (or in place of) the percentages in a smaller font; 26 seats were required for an absolute majority in the Parliament of Navarre.

Color key:

Exit poll

Polling firm/Commissioner	Fieldwork date	Sample size	Turnout	UPN	PSN–PSOE	EH	IUN/NEB	CDN	EA	PNV	Batzarre	Aralar	Lead
2003 regional election	25 May 2003	—N/a	70.7	41.5; 23	21.2; 11	–	8.8; 4	7.7; 4	7.4; 4	(Note: Within EA.)	2.6; 0	7.8; 4	20.3
Sigma Dos/Antena 3	25 May 2003	?	?	? 24/25	? 12/13	–	? 5	? 4	? 4		–	–	?
Ipsos–Eco/RTVE	25 May 2003	?	?	? 24	? 11/13	–	? 4/5	–	–		–	–	?
CIES/Diario de Navarra	7–13 May 2003	1,600	65	43.6; 22/24	25.5; 12/14	–	8.1; 4/5	7.5; 3/4	6.7; 3/4		1.5; 0	6.5; 3	18.1
CIS	22 Mar–28 Apr 2003	829	67.1	38.3; 24	20.7; 13	–	8.6; 5	6.3; 3	8.4; 5		–	–	17.6
CIES/Diario de Navarra	17–28 Feb 2003	1,212	65	40.6; 22	23.7; 12	10.4; 5	6.4; 3	5.7; 3	7.4; 4		2.1; 0	3.2; 1	16.9
Navcomtel/Parliament of Navarre	21–27 Oct 2002	1,600	?	41.2; 22/23	22.5; 11/12	13.0; 6/7	7.5; 3/4	5.6; 2/3	4.9; 2		1.1; 0	3.3; 1	18.7
CIS	9 Sep–9 Oct 2002	443	67.3	43.9; 25	21.0; 12	8.7; 4	8.6; 4	4.8; 2	5.1; 2	3.3; 1	–	–	22.9
CIES/Parliament of Navarre	24 Sep–2 Oct 2001	1,300	68	44.2; 23/24	24.0; 12/13	8.1; 4	6.6; 3	5.4; 2	6.4; 3		1.2; 0	3.8; 2	20.2
2000 general election	12 Mar 2000	—N/a	66.1	49.9 (29)	27.3 (15)	–	7.6 (4)	2.9 (0)	6.8 (2)	2.2 (0)	–	–	22.6
1999 regional election	13 Jun 1999	—N/a	66.2	41.4; 22	20.3; 11	15.6; 8	6.9; 3	6.9; 3	5.4; 3		(Note: Within EH.)	–	21.1

=== Voting preferences ===
The table below lists raw, unweighted voting preferences.

Polling firm/Commissioner	Fieldwork date	Sample size	UPN	PSN–PSOE	EH	IUN/NEB	CDN	EA	PNV	Batzarre	Aralar	Question	X mark	Lead
2003 regional election (Note: Does not include non-resident citizens.)	25 May 2003	—N/a	28.0	14.3	–	5.9	5.2	5.0		1.7	5.2	—N/a	27.7	13.7
CIS	22 Mar–28 Apr 2003	829	18.2	11.8	–	4.9	1.4	4.3		–	–	43.4	9.7	6.4
Navcomtel/Parliament of Navarre	21–27 Oct 2002	1,600	24.8	13.5	8.1	4.8	3.6	3.1		0.6	2.0	32.2	3.9	11.3
CIS	9 Sep–9 Oct 2002	443	19.2	13.3	2.0	3.8	0.7	1.4	0.9	–	–	41.0	14.2	5.9
CIES/Parliament of Navarre	24 Sep–2 Oct 2001	1,300	21.4	11.8	4.5	4.8	2.8	4.0		0.7	1.7	34.5	10.3	9.6
2000 general election	12 Mar 2000	—N/a	33.1	18.1	–	5.1	1.9	3.1	1.4	–	–	—N/a	32.8	15.0
1999 regional election	13 Jun 1999	—N/a	27.4	13.4	10.3	4.6	4.6	3.6			–	—N/a	33.0	14.0

=== Victory preferences ===
The table below lists opinion polling on the victory preferences for each party in the event of a regional election taking place.

Polling firm/Commissioner	Fieldwork date	Sample size	UPN	PSN–PSOE	IUN/NEB	CDN	EA	Other/ None	Question	Lead
CIS	22 Mar–28 Apr 2003	829	24.5	18.1	6.5	2.4	5.1	5.9	37.5	6.4

=== Victory likelihood ===
The table below lists opinion polling on the perceived likelihood of victory for each party in the event of a regional election taking place.

Polling firm/Commissioner	Fieldwork date	Sample size	UPN	PSN–PSOE	IUN/NEB	CDN	EA	Other/ None	Question	Lead
CIS	22 Mar–28 Apr 2003	829	60.9	9.9	0.0	0.2	0.3	0.0	28.6	51.0

=== Preferred President ===
The table below lists opinion polling on leader preferences to become president of the Government of Navarre.

Polling firm/Commissioner	Fieldwork date	Sample size						Other/ None/ Not care	Question	Lead
Polling firm/Commissioner	Fieldwork date	Sample size	Sanz UPN	Lizarbe PSN	Taberna IUN	Alli CDN	Errazti EA	Other/ None/ Not care	Question	Lead
CIS	22 Mar–28 Apr 2003	829	25.1	13.1	5.0	8.1	5.2	3.0	40.5	12.0

== Results ==
← Summary of the 25 May 2003 Parliament of Navarre election results →
Parties and alliances	Popular vote			Seats	
Parties and alliances	Votes	%	±pp	Total	+/−
Navarrese People's Union (UPN)	127,460	41.48	+0.11	23	+1
Socialist Party of Navarre (PSN–PSOE)	65,003	21.15	+0.87	11	±0
United Left of Navarre (IUN/NEB)	26,962	8.77	+1.89	4	+1
Aralar (Aralar)	24,068	7.83	New	4	+4
Convergence of Democrats of Navarre (CDN)	23,516	7.65	+0.79	4	+1
Basque Solidarity–Basque Nationalist Party (EA–PNV)	22,824	7.43	+1.99	4	+1
Assembly (Batzarre)	7,873	2.56	New	0	±0
Humanist Party (PH)	1,290	0.42	New	0	±0
Carlist Party (EKA–PC)	1,017	0.33	+0.04	0	±0
Basque Citizens (EH)	n/a	n/a	−15.58	0	−8
Blank ballots	7,304	2.38	+0.03		
Total	307,317			50	±0
Valid votes	307,317	93.52	−5.65		
Invalid votes	21,292	6.48	+5.65		
Votes cast / turnout	328,609	70.70	+4.45		
Abstentions	136,217	29.30	−4.45		
Registered voters	464,826				

Popular vote
UPN	41.48%
PSN–PSOE	21.15%
IUN/NEB	8.77%
Aralar	7.83%
CDN	7.65%
EA–PNV	7.43%
Batzarre	2.56%
Others	0.75%
Blank ballots	2.38%

Seats
UPN	46.00%
PSN–PSOE	22.00%
IUN/NEB	8.00%
Aralar	8.00%
CDN	8.00%
EA–PNV	8.00%

== Aftermath ==
=== Government formation ===
Investiture; Nomination of Miguel Sanz (UPN)
Ballot →	26 June 2003
Required majority →	26 out of 50
Yes: • UPN (23); • CDN (4)	27 / 50
No: • PSN (11); • IUN (4); • Aralar (4); • EA–PNV (4)	23 / 50
Abstentions	0 / 50
Absentees	0 / 50

== Bibliography ==
- Ley Orgánica 13/1982, de 10 de agosto, de reintegración y amejoramiento del Régimen Foral de Navarra (Organic Law 13/1982). Official State Gazette (in Spanish). 10 August 1982 [version as of 28 March 2001]. BOE-A-1982-20824.
- Ley Orgánica 5/1985, de 19 de junio, del Régimen Electoral General (Organic Law 5/1985). Official State Gazette (in Spanish). 19 June 1985 [version as of 11 March 2003]. BOE-A-1985-11672.
- Ley Foral 16/1986, de 17 de noviembre, reguladora de las elecciones al Parlamento de Navarra (Foral Law 16/1986). Official State Gazette (in Spanish). 17 November 1986 [version as of 12 October 1998]. BOE-A-1987-1255.
- Decreto Foral 1/2003, de 31 de marzo, del Presidente del Gobierno de Navarra, por el que se convocan elecciones al Parlamento de Navarra (Foral Decree 1/2003). Official State Gazette (in Spanish). 31 March 2003. BOE-A-2003-6502.
