= 1999 Spanish regional elections =

- 13 June 1999; 17 October 1999

919 seats in the regional parliaments of Aragon, Asturias, Balearic Islands, Canary Islands, Cantabria, Castile and León, Castilla–La Mancha, Catalonia, Extremadura, La Rioja, Madrid, Murcia, Navarre and Valencian Community
Regional administrations by leading party in 1999
National parties
PP (7+2)
PSOE (6)
Regional parties
CiU (1)
EAJ/PNV (1)
CC (1)
UPN (Note: PP's sister party in Navarre.) (1)

Regional elections were held in Spain during 1999 to elect the regional parliaments of fourteen of the seventeen autonomous communities: Aragon, Asturias, the Balearic Islands, the Canary Islands, Cantabria, Castile and León, Castilla–La Mancha, Catalonia, Extremadura, La Rioja, Madrid, Murcia, Navarre and the Valencian Community. 919 of 1,178 seats in the regional parliaments were up for election. The elections were held on 13 June for most regions (concurrently with local elections all across the country, as well as the 1999 European Parliament election) and on 17 October in Catalonia.

== Election date ==
Determination of election day varied depending on the autonomous community. Typically, most autonomous communities held their elections on the fourth Sunday of May every four years, concurrently with nationwide local elections, while others had their own, separate electoral cycles. In some cases, regional presidents had the prerogative to dissolve parliament and call for extra elections at a different time, but newly elected assemblies were restricted to serving out what remained of their previous four year-terms without altering the period to their next ordinary election. In other cases—Andalusia (since 1994), the Basque Country (1981), Catalonia (1985) and Galicia (1985)—the law granted regional presidents the power to call snap elections resulting in fresh four-year parliamentary terms. Legal amendments introduced in 1998 allowed for regional elections held in May 1995 to be held concurrently with European Parliament elections, provided that they were scheduled for within a four month-timespan.

== Regional governments ==
The following table lists party control in autonomous communities. Gains for a party are highlighted in that party's colour.

Election day	Region	Previous control	New control
13 June	Aragon	People's Party (PP)	Spanish Socialist Workers' Party (PSOE)
13 June	Asturias	Asturian Renewal Union (URAS)	Spanish Socialist Workers' Party (PSOE)
13 June	Balearic Islands	People's Party (PP)	Spanish Socialist Workers' Party (PSOE)
13 June	Canary Islands	Canarian Coalition (CC)	Canarian Coalition (CC)
13 June	Cantabria	People's Party (PP)	People's Party (PP)
13 June	Castile and León	People's Party (PP)	People's Party (PP)
13 June	Castilla–La Mancha	Spanish Socialist Workers' Party (PSOE)	Spanish Socialist Workers' Party (PSOE)
13 June	Extremadura	Spanish Socialist Workers' Party (PSOE)	Spanish Socialist Workers' Party (PSOE)
13 June	La Rioja	People's Party (PP)	People's Party (PP)
13 June	Madrid	People's Party (PP)	People's Party (PP)
13 June	Murcia	People's Party (PP)	People's Party (PP)
13 June	Navarre	Navarrese People's Union (UPN)	Navarrese People's Union (UPN)
13 June	Valencian Community	People's Party (PP)	People's Party (PP)
17 October	Catalonia	Convergence and Union (CiU)	Convergence and Union (CiU)

== Summary by region ==
=== June (13 regions) ===
==== Aragon ====
Parties and alliances	Votes	%	±pp	Seats	+/−
PP	249,458	38.21	+0.71	28	+1
PSOE	201,117	30.81	+5.09	23	+4
PAR	86,519	13.25	−7.18	10	−4
CHA	72,101	11.04	+6.19	5	+3
IU	25,040	3.86	−5.36	1	−4
Others	4,976	0.76		0	±0
Blank ballots	13,599	2.08	+0.50		
Valid votes	652,810	99.29	−0.11		
Invalid votes	4,654	0.71	+0.11		
Votes cast / turnout	657,464	64.60	−6.52		
Registered voters	1,017,735				

==== Asturias ====
Parties and alliances	Votes	%	±pp	Seats	+/−
PSOE	284,972	46.00	+12.17	24	+7
PP	200,164	32.31	−9.69	15	−6
IU	55,747	9.00	−7.42	3	−3
URAS	44,261	7.14	New	3	+3
PAS	15,998	2.58	−0.61	0	−1
Others	8,624	1.39		0	±0
Blank ballots	9,720	1.57	+0.39		
Valid votes	619,486	99.40	−0.01		
Invalid votes	3,756	0.60	+0.01		
Votes cast / turnout	623,242	63.62	−5.43		
Registered voters	979,618				

==== Balearic Islands ====
Parties and alliances	Votes	%	±pp	Seats	+/−
PP	160,545	44.01	−0.76	28	−2
PSIB–PSOE	80,327	22.02	+0.77	13	+1
PSM–EN	42,748	11.72	−0.33	5	−1
UM	26,682	7.31	+1.99	3	+1
EU–EV	19,793	5.43	−3.14	3	±0
Pacte+COP	17,697	4.85	+0.77	7	+2
Others	10,262	2.81		0	±0
Blank ballots	6,777	1.86	+0.50		
Valid votes	364,831	99.22	−0.15		
Invalid votes	2,852	0.78	+0.15		
Votes cast / turnout	367,683	57.50	−6.06		
Registered voters	639,398				

==== Canary Islands ====
Parties and alliances	Votes	%	±pp	Seats	+/−
CC	306,658	36.93	+4.13	24	+3
PP	225,316	27.13	−3.94	15	−3
PSOE	199,503	24.03	+0.95	19	+3
FNC	39,947	4.81	+1.81	0	−4
IUC	22,768	2.74	−2.36	0	±0
LVC	12,146	1.46	New	0	±0
AHI	2,773	0.33	+0.07	2	+1
Others	8,683	1.05		0	±0
Blank ballots	12,558	1.51	+0.37		
Valid votes	830,352	99.42	−0.01		
Invalid votes	4,829	0.58	+0.01		
Votes cast / turnout	835,181	60.80	−3.40		
Registered voters	1,373,641				

==== Cantabria ====
Parties and alliances	Votes	%	±pp	Seats	+/−
PP	134,924	42.50	+10.00	19	+6
PSOE–p	105,004	33.08	+7.94	14	+4
PRC	42,896	13.51	−1.05	6	±0
IUC	11,707	3.69	−3.67	0	−3
UPCA	9,743	3.07	−13.55	0	−7
Others	5,442	1.71		0	±0
Blank ballots	7,717	2.43	+0.50		
Valid votes	317,433	99.21	+0.02		
Invalid votes	2,514	0.79	−0.02		
Votes cast / turnout	319,947	68.78	−5.27		
Registered voters	465,168				

==== Castile and León ====
Parties and alliances	Votes	%	±pp	Seats	+/−
PP	737,982	50.45	−1.75	48	−2
PSOE	483,675	33.06	+3.35	30	+3
IUCyL	79,390	5.43	−4.15	1	−4
UPL	54,158	3.70	+1.15	3	+1
TC–PNC	20,274	1.39	+0.77	1	+1
Others	48,299	3.30		0	±0
Blank ballots	39,036	2.67	+0.84		
Valid votes	1,462,814	99.05	−0.06		
Invalid votes	14,044	0.95	+0.06		
Votes cast / turnout	1,476,858	67.58	−6.01		
Registered voters	2,185,507				

==== Castilla–La Mancha ====
Parties and alliances	Votes	%	±pp	Seats	+/−
PSOE–p	561,332	53.42	+7.72	26	+2
PP	424,531	40.40	−3.90	21	−1
IU–ICAM	35,881	3.41	−4.19	0	−1
Others	14,191	1.35		0	±0
Blank ballots	14,929	1.42	+0.37		
Valid votes	1,050,864	99.32	+0.04		
Invalid votes	7,146	0.68	−0.04		
Votes cast / turnout	1,058,010	74.85	−3.98		
Registered voters	1,413,503				

==== Extremadura ====
Parties and alliances	Votes	%	±pp	Seats	+/−
PSOE–p	313,417	48.48	+4.54	34	+3
PP	258,657	40.01	+0.55	28	+1
IU–CE	39,132	6.05	−4.49	3	−3
EU	10,783	1.67	New	0	±0
CREx–PREx	7,437	1.15	−2.67	0	−1
Others	9,648	1.49		0	±0
Blank ballots	7,408	1.15	+0.27		
Valid votes	646,482	99.38	+0.04		
Invalid votes	4,045	0.62	−0.04		
Votes cast / turnout	650,527	73.44	−4.89		
Registered voters	885,753				

==== La Rioja ====
Parties and alliances	Votes	%	±pp	Seats	+/−
PP	80,088	51.26	+1.82	18	+1
PSOE	55,126	35.28	+1.19	13	+1
PR	9,004	5.76	−0.94	2	±0
IU	6,104	3.91	−3.30	0	−2
LV	1,971	1.26	New	0	±0
MASH	418	0.27	New	0	±0
Blank ballots	3,535	2.26	+0.53		
Valid votes	156,246	99.13	−0.17		
Invalid votes	1,377	0.87	+0.17		
Votes cast / turnout	157,623	68.66	−7.50		
Registered voters	229,569				

==== Madrid ====
Parties and alliances	Votes	%	±pp	Seats	+/−
PP	1,324,596	51.07	+0.09	55	+1
PSOE–p	944,819	36.43	+6.71	39	+7
IU	199,488	7.69	−8.34	8	−9
Others	70,251	2.71		0	±0
Blank ballots	54,341	2.10	+0.76		
Valid votes	2,593,495	99.51	−0.11		
Invalid votes	12,830	0.49	+0.11		
Votes cast / turnout	2,606,325	60.88	−9.51		
Registered voters	4,281,075				

==== Murcia ====
Parties and alliances	Votes	%	±pp	Seats	+/−
PP	323,446	52.84	+0.61	26	±0
PSOE	219,798	35.91	+4.04	18	+3
IURM	42,839	7.00	−5.46	1	−3
Others	17,148	2.80		0	±0
Blank ballots	8,839	1.44	+0.33		
Valid votes	612,070	99.30	+0.16		
Invalid votes	4,327	0.70	−0.16		
Votes cast / turnout	616,397	67.66	−7.61		
Registered voters	911,054				

==== Navarre ====
Parties and alliances	Votes	%	±pp	Seats	+/−
UPN	125,497	41.37	+10.02	22	+5
PSN–PSOE	61,531	20.28	−0.59	11	±0
EH	47,271	15.58	+4.17	8	+3
IU/EB	20,879	6.88	−2.47	3	−2
CDN	20,821	6.86	−8.70	3	−7
EA–PNV	16,512	5.44	−0.12	3	+1
Others	3,704	1.22		0	±0
Blank ballots	7,126	2.35	+0.44		
Valid votes	303,341	99.17	−0.04		
Invalid votes	2,539	0.83	+0.04		
Votes cast / turnout	305,880	66.25	−2.15		
Registered voters	461,729				

==== Valencian Community ====
Parties and alliances	Votes	%	±pp	Seats	+/−
PP	1,085,011	47.88	+5.05	49	+7
PSOE–p	768,548	33.91	−0.07	35	+3
EUPV	137,212	6.05	−5.48	5	−5
UV	106,119	4.68	−2.33	0	−5
BNV–EV	102,700	4.53	+1.82	0	±0
Others	31,517	1.39		0	±0
Blank ballots	35,168	1.55	+0.50		
Valid votes	2,266,275	99.41	−0.03		
Invalid votes	13,530	0.59	+0.03		
Votes cast / turnout	2,279,805	67.81	−8.22		
Registered voters	3,361,989				

=== October (Catalonia) ===
Parties and alliances	Votes	%	±pp	Seats	+/−
PSC–CpC	1,183,299	37.85	+11.75	52	+17
CiU	1,178,420	37.70	−3.25	56	−4
PP	297,265	9.51	−3.57	12	−5
ERC	271,173	8.67	−0.82	12	−1
IC–V	78,441	2.51	n/a	3	−5
EUiA	44,454	1.42	n/a	0	−1
Others	44,070	1.41		0	±0
Blank ballots	28,968	0.93	−0.04		
Valid votes	3,126,090	99.75	+0.03		
Invalid votes	7,836	0.25	−0.03		
Votes cast / turnout	3,133,926	59.20	−4.44		
Registered voters	5,293,657				

== Bibliography ==
- Ley Orgánica 5/1985, de 19 de junio, del Régimen Electoral General (Organic Law 5/1985). Official State Gazette (in Spanish). 19 June 1985 [version as of 22 April 1999]. BOE-A-1985-11672.
