= 1999 Navarrese regional election =

Election in the Spanish region of Navarre

- 13 June 1999

All 50 seats in the Parliament of Navarre 26 seats needed for a majority
- Opinion polls
- Registered: 461,729 ▲5.5%
- Turnout: 305,880 (66.2%) ▼2.2 pp
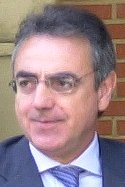

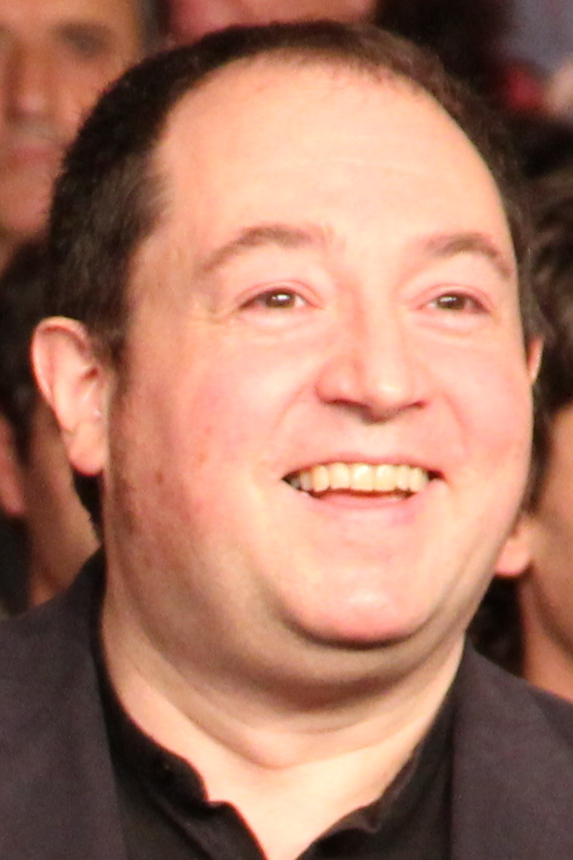

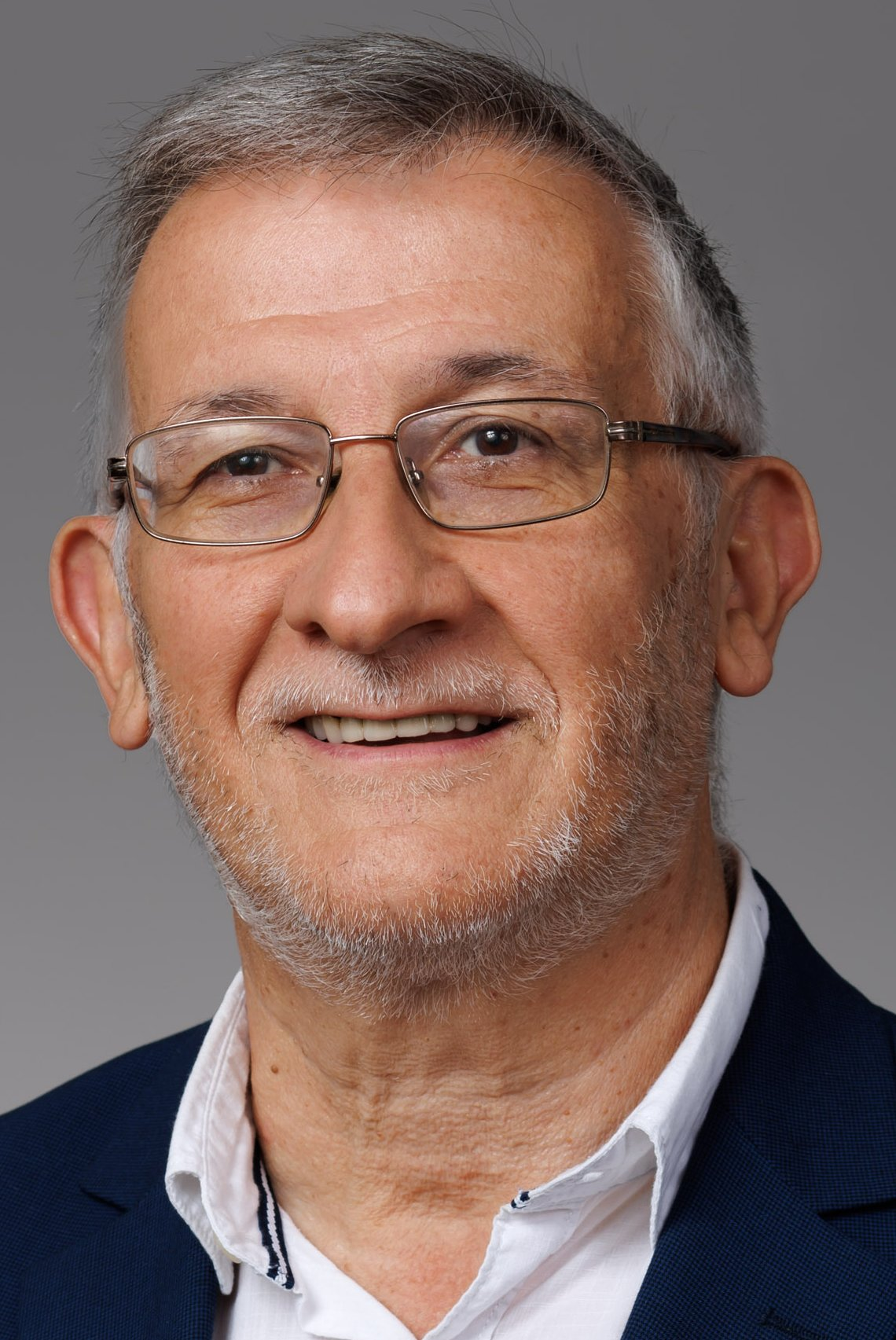

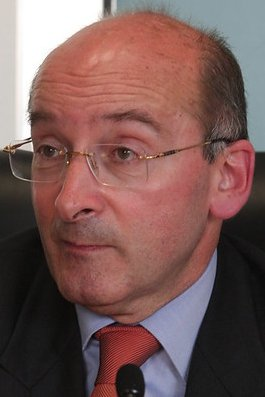

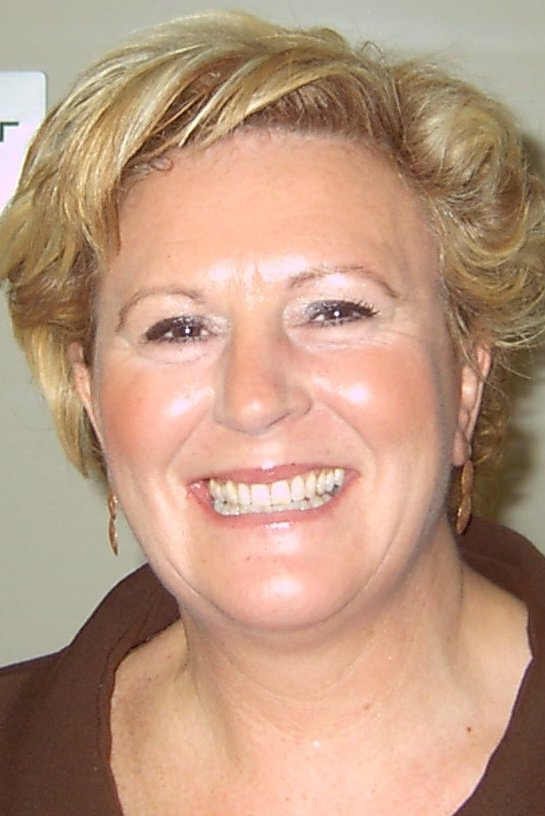
	First party	Second party	Third party
Leader	Miguel Sanz	Juan José Lizarbe	Pernando Barrena
Party	UPN	PSN–PSOE	EH
Leader since	17 January 1995	18 December 1997	1998
Last election	17 seats, 31.3%	11 seats, 20.9%	5 seats, 11.4% (Note: Results for HB (9.2%, 5 seats) and Batzarre (2.2%, 0 seats) in the 1995 election.)
Seats won	22	11	8
Seat change	▲5	0	▲3
Popular vote	125,497	61,531	47,271
Percentage	41.4%	20.3%	15.6%
Swing	▲10.1 pp	▼0.6 pp	▲4.2 pp
	Fourth party	Fifth party	Sixth party
Leader	Félix Taberna	Juan Cruz Alli	Begoña Errazti
Party	IU/EB	CDN	EA–PNV
Leader since	1991	10 April 1995	1995
Last election	5 seats, 9.3%	10 seats, 18.6%	2 seats, 5.6% (Note: Results for EA (4.6%, 2 seats) and NA (1.0%, 0 seats) in the 1995 election.)
Seats won	3	3	3
Seat change	▼2	▼7	▲1
Popular vote	20,879	20,821	16,512
Percentage	6.9%	6.9%	5.4%
Swing	▼2.4 pp	▼11.7 pp	▼0.2 pp
President before election
Miguel Sanz
UPN
President after election
Miguel Sanz
UPN

A regional election was held in Navarre on 13 June 1999 to elect the 5th Parliament of the chartered community. All 50 seats in the Parliament were up for election. It was held concurrently with regional elections in twelve other autonomous communities and local elections all across Spain, as well as the 1999 European Parliament election.

== Overview ==
Under the 1982 Reintegration and Improvement of the Chartered Regime, the Parliament of Navarre was the unicameral legislature of the homonymous chartered community, having legislative power in devolved matters, as well as the ability to grant or withdraw confidence from a regional president. The electoral and procedural rules were supplemented by national law provisions.

=== Date ===
The term of the Parliament of Navarre expired four years after the date of its previous ordinary election, with election day being fixed for the fourth Sunday of May every four years, but a 1998 amendment allowed for regional elections held in May 1995 to be held concurrently with European Parliament elections, provided that they were scheduled for within a four month-timespan. The election decree was required to be issued no later than 54 days before the scheduled election date and published on the following day in the Official Gazette of Navarre (BON). The previous election was held on 28 May 1995, setting the date for election day concurrently with that year's European Parliament election on 13 June 1999.

The Parliament of Navarre could not be dissolved before the expiration date of parliament.

The election to the Parliament of Navarre was officially called on 20 April 1999 with the publication of the corresponding decree in the BON, setting election day for 13 June and scheduling for the chamber to reconvene on 2 July.

=== Electoral system ===
Voting for the Parliament was based on universal suffrage, comprising all Spanish nationals over 18 years of age, registered in Navarre and with full political rights, provided that they had not been deprived of the right to vote by a final sentence, nor were legally incapacitated.

The Parliament of Navarre had a minimum of 40 and a maximum of 60 seats, with electoral provisions fixing its size at 50. All were elected in a single multi-member constituency—corresponding to the chartered community's territory—using the D'Hondt method and closed-list proportional voting, with a three percent-threshold of valid votes (including blank ballots) regionally.

The law did not provide for by-elections to fill vacant seats; instead, any vacancies arising after the proclamation of candidates and during the legislative term were filled by the next candidates on the party lists or, when required, by designated substitutes.

== Parties and candidates ==
The electoral law allowed for parties and federations registered in the interior ministry, alliances and groupings of electors to present lists of candidates. Parties and federations intending to form a coalition ahead of an election were required to inform the relevant electoral commission within 10 days of the election call, whereas groupings of electors needed to secure the signature of at least one percent of the electorate in Navarre, disallowing electors from signing for more than one list.

Below is a list of the main parties and alliances which contested the election:

Candidacy	Parties and alliances	Leading candidate	Ideology	Previous result		Gov.	Ref.
Candidacy	Parties and alliances	Leading candidate	Ideology	Vote %	Seats	Gov.	Ref.
UPN	List: Navarrese People's Union (UPN)	Miguel Sanz	Conservatism; Christian democracy Regionalism	31.3%	17	Yes	
PSN–PSOE	List: Socialist Party of Navarre (PSN–PSOE)	Juan José Lizarbe	Social democracy	20.9%	11	No	
CDN	List: Convergence of Democrats of Navarre (CDN)	Juan Cruz Alli	Christian democracy Regionalism	18.6%	10	No	
EH	List: Popular Unity (HB) – Basque Nationalist Action (EAE/ANV); Assembly (Batzarre); Stand Up (Zutik)	Pernando Barrena	Basque independence Abertzale left Revolutionary socialism	11.4%	5	No	
IU/EB	List: United Left (IU/EB) – Communist Party of the Basque Country (PCE/EPK) – Socialist Action Party (PASOC) – Republican Left (IR) – Revolutionary Workers' Party (POR) – Workers' Revolutionary Party (PRT)	Félix Taberna	Socialism; Communism	9.3%	5	No	
EA–PNV	List: Basque Solidarity (EA); Basque Nationalist Party (EAJ/PNV)	Begoña Errazti	Basque nationalism Social democracy Christian democracy	5.6%	2	No	

== Opinion polls ==
The tables below list opinion polling results in reverse chronological order, showing the most recent first and using the dates when the survey fieldwork was done, as opposed to the date of publication. Where the fieldwork dates are unknown, the date of publication is given instead. The highest percentage figure in each polling survey is displayed with its background shaded in the leading party's colour. If a tie ensues, this is applied to the figures with the highest percentages. The "Lead" column on the right shows the percentage-point difference between the parties with the highest percentages in a poll.

=== Voting intention estimates ===
The table below lists weighted voting intention estimates. Refusals are generally excluded from the party vote percentages, while question wording and the treatment of "don't know" responses and those not intending to vote may vary between polling organisations. When available, seat projections determined by the polling organisations are displayed below (or in place of) the percentages in a smaller font; 26 seats were required for an absolute majority in the Parliament of Navarre.

Polling firm/Commissioner	Fieldwork date	Sample size	Turnout	UPN	PSN–PSOE	CDN	IU	HB	EA	Batzarre	PNV	EH	Lead
1999 regional election	13 Jun 1999	—N/a	66.2	41.4; 22	20.3; 11	6.9; 3	6.9; 3	(Note: Within EH.)	5.4; 3		(Note: Within EA.)	15.6; 8	21.1
Eco Consulting/ABC	24 May–2 Jun 1999	?	?	36.7; 20	19.0; 10	15.6; 8	6.7; 3		4.6; 2			12.7; 7	17.7
Demoscopia/El País	26 May–1 Jun 1999	?	65	37.7; 21	24.6; 13	5.9; 3	8.9; 4		6.5; 3			11.9; 6	13.1
CIES/Diario de Navarra	26 May–1 Jun 1999	1,502	73	38.1; 20/22	25.2; 12/14	6.4; 3/4	8.1; 3/4		5.4; 2/3			13.0; 6/7	12.9
Sigma Dos/El Mundo	17–21 May 1999	600	?	36.5; 20/21	22.9; 12/13	9.6; 5	9.9; 5		4.9; 2			9.8; 5	13.6
Ikerfel/Noticias	18–20 May 1999	841	67.1	42.1; 22	21.8; 11	8.6; 4	11.1; 5		6.2; 3			9.6; 5	20.3
CIS	3–19 May 1999	654	67.0	39.3; 20/21	21.6; 11/12	11.0; 5/6	7.1; 3/4		4.6; 2			11.3; 5/6	17.7
CIES/Diario de Navarra	17–24 Mar 1999	1,205	?	40.5; 21	25.8; 13	7.5; 4	9.1; 4		5.2; 2			11.2; 6	14.7
Ikerfel/Noticias	1–2 Feb 1999	816	69.5	39.5; 21	23.5; 12	7.1; 3	11.1; 6		4.0; 2		2.5; 0	11.1; 6	16.0
CIES/Diario de Navarra	9–12 Jun 1998	800	?	38.1; 21	27.5; 15	6.0; 3	10.5; 5	8.5; 4	4.4; 2	2.1; 0	1.5; 0	–	10.6
Ikerfel/Noticias	16–18 Mar 1998	816	65.8	40.5; 21/22	26.3; 14	9.8; 5	11.0; 5/6	6.3; 3	3.4; 1	–	1.5; 0	–	14.2
1996 general election	3 Mar 1996	—N/a	73.5	37.1 (20)	30.3 (16)	5.3 (2)	12.4 (6)	8.2 (4)	3.8 (2)	–	1.0 (0)	–	6.8
1995 regional election	28 May 1995	—N/a	68.4	31.3; 17	20.9; 11	18.6; 10	9.3; 5	9.2; 5	4.6; 2	2.2; 0	1.0; 0	–	10.4

=== Voting preferences ===
The table below lists raw, unweighted voting preferences.

Polling firm/Commissioner	Fieldwork date	Sample size	UPN	PSN–PSOE	CDN	IU	HB	EA	Batzarre	PNV	EH	Question	X mark	Lead
1999 regional election (Note: Does not include non-resident citizens.)	13 Jun 1999	—N/a	27.4	13.4	4.6	4.6		3.6			10.3	—N/a	33.0	14.0
CIS	3–19 May 1999	654	22.8	13.0	2.6	4.4		2.3			4.9	37.0	11.3	9.8
1996 general election	3 Mar 1996	—N/a	27.3	22.2	3.9	9.2	6.0	2.8	–	0.7	–	—N/a	25.9	5.1
1995 regional election	28 May 1995	—N/a	21.5	14.3	12.7	6.4	6.4	3.2	1.5	0.7	–	—N/a	30.8	7.2

=== Victory preferences ===
The table below lists opinion polling on the victory preferences for each party in the event of a regional election taking place.

Polling firm/Commissioner	Fieldwork date	Sample size	UPN	PSN–PSOE	CDN	IU	EA	EH	Other/ None	Question	Lead
CIS	3–19 May 1999	654	28.9	15.4	2.4	5.4	2.3	5.0	0.8	39.7	13.5

=== Victory likelihood ===
The table below lists opinion polling on the perceived likelihood of victory for each party in the event of a regional election taking place.

Polling firm/Commissioner	Fieldwork date	Sample size	UPN	PSN–PSOE	IU	EA	EH	Other/ None	Question	Lead
CIS	3–19 May 1999	654	63.6	3.4	0.3	0.2	0.3	–	32.3	60.2

=== Preferred President ===
The table below lists opinion polling on leader preferences to become president of the Government of Navarre.

Polling firm/Commissioner	Fieldwork date	Sample size							Other/ None/ Not care	Question	Lead
Polling firm/Commissioner	Fieldwork date	Sample size	Sanz UPN	Lizarbe PSN	Alli CDN	Taberna IUN	Errazti EA	Barrena EH	Other/ None/ Not care	Question	Lead
CIS	3–19 May 1999	654	33.6	6.7	7.5	4.1	2.0	3.7	0.6	41.7	26.1

== Results ==
← Summary of the 13 June 1999 Parliament of Navarre election results →
Parties and alliances	Popular vote			Seats	
Parties and alliances	Votes	%	±pp	Total	+/−
Navarrese People's Union (UPN)	125,497	41.37	+10.02	22	+5
Socialist Party of Navarre (PSN–PSOE)	61,531	20.28	−0.59	11	±0
Basque Citizens (EH)^{1}	47,271	15.58	+4.17	8	+3
United Left (IU/EB)	20,879	6.88	−2.47	3	−2
Convergence of Democrats of Navarre (CDN)	20,821	6.86	−8.70	3	−7
Basque Solidarity–Basque Nationalist Party (EA–PNV)^{2}	16,512	5.44	−0.12	3	+1
Independents of Navarre (IN)	2,835	0.93	New	0	±0
Carlist Party (EKA)	869	0.29	+0.01	0	±0
Blank ballots	7,126	2.35	+0.44		
Total	303,341			50	±0
Valid votes	303,341	99.17	−0.04		
Invalid votes	2,539	0.83	+0.04		
Votes cast / turnout	305,880	66.25	−2.15		
Abstentions	155,849	33.75	+2.15		
Registered voters	461,729				
Sources
Footnotes: ^{1} Basque Citizens results are compared to the combined totals of Popular Unity and Assembly in the 1995 election.; ^{2} Basque Solidarity–Basque Nationalist Party results are compared to the combined totals of Basque Solidarity and Nationalists of Navarre in the 1995 election.

Popular vote
UPN	41.37%
PSN–PSOE	20.28%
EH	15.58%
IU/EB	6.88%
CDN	6.86%
EA–PNV	5.44%
Others	1.22%
Blank ballots	2.35%

Seats
UPN	44.00%
PSN–PSOE	22.00%
EH	16.00%
IU/EB	6.00%
CDN	6.00%
EA–PNV	6.00%

== Aftermath ==
=== Government formation ===
Investiture; Nomination of Miguel Sanz (UPN)
Ballot →	21 July 1999	23 July 1999	26 July 1999
Required majority →	26 out of 50	26 out of 50	Simple
Yes: • UPN (22)	22 / 50	22 / 50	22 / 50
No: • EH (7); • IU (3); • CDN (3); • EA–PNV (3)	16 / 50	16 / 50	16 / 50
Abstentions: • PSN (11) (10 on 21 Jul)	10 / 50	11 / 50	11 / 50
Absentees: • PSN (1) (on 21 Jul); • EH (1)	2 / 50	1 / 50	1 / 50

== Bibliography ==
- Ley Orgánica 13/1982, de 10 de agosto, de reintegración y amejoramiento del Régimen Foral de Navarra (Organic Law 13/1982). Official State Gazette (in Spanish). 10 August 1982 [version as of 16 August 1982]. BOE-A-1982-20824.
- Ley Orgánica 5/1985, de 19 de junio, del Régimen Electoral General (Organic Law 5/1985). Official State Gazette (in Spanish). 19 June 1985 [version as of 22 April 1999]. BOE-A-1985-11672.
- Ley Foral 16/1986, de 17 de noviembre, reguladora de las elecciones al Parlamento de Navarra (Foral Law 16/1986). Official State Gazette (in Spanish). 17 November 1986 [version as of 12 October 1998]. BOE-A-1987-1255.
- Decreto Foral 2/1999, de 19 de abril, del Presidente del Gobierno de Navarra, por el que se convocan elecciones al Parlamento de Navarra (Foral Decree 2/1999). Official State Gazette (in Spanish). 19 April 1999. BOE-A-1999-8730.
