= Bel Pozueta =

Spanish politician (born 1965)

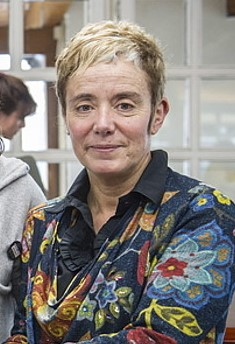
- Pozueta in January 2019

Member of the Congress of Deputies of Spain
- Incumbent
- Assumed office 3 December 2019
- Constituency: Navarre

Personal details
- Born: Maria Isabel Pozueta Fernández; 21 September 1965 (age 61) Altsasu, Navarre, Spain
- Party: EH Bildu
- Education: University of Deusto; University of Alcalá

Maria Isabel Pozueta Fernández (born 21 September 1965) is a Spanish sexologist, activist, politician and a member of the Congress of Deputies of Spain.

== Early life ==
Pozueta was born on 21 September 1965 in Altsasu, Navarre. She has a degree in sociology from the University of Deusto and a master's degree in sexology from the University of Alcalá's Institute of Sexological Sciences.

== Career ==
Pozueta is an expert in sexology and co-education. Between 1994 and 2006 she taught sex education at the Center for Women's Care in Etxarri-Aranatz, teaching individuals and groups and training professionals. Later she taught at various education centres in Gipuzkoa and Navarre. She has also worked for the municipal youth service in Vitoria-Gasteiz and was director of Biok Tú y Yo, a couples therapy centre in Burlata.

At the 1999 regional election Pozueta was placed 31st on Euskal Herritarrok's list of candidates in Navarre but the alliance only won eight seats in the region and as a result she failed to get elected. At the 2003 local elections in Altsasu she was placed 11th on the Altsasuko Indarra (AI) electoral alliance's list of the candidates but the Supreme Court annulled the list as it considered AI to be a successor to Batasuna which had been banned in March 2003. She was one of the founders of the Altsasu branch of the Gure Esku Dago which campaigns for self-determination for the Basque Country.

Pozueta came to national prominences as the mother of Adur Ramirez de Alda Pozueta, one of eight youths imprisoned for the Altsasu incident in 2016. She was the spokesperson for the Altsasu Gurasoak group which represented the mothers of the prisoners. She resigned as spokesperson in March 2019, though she remained a member, in order to contest the general election as the group had stated that it would not support any candidate.

At the April 2019 general election Pozueta was placed first on EH Bildu's list of candidates in Navarre but the alliance failed to win any seats in the region. She contested the 2019 November general election as a EH Bildu candidate in Navarre and was elected to the Congress of Deputies.

== Electoral history ==
Electoral history of Bel Pozueta
Election	Constituency	Party	Alliance	No.	Result
1999 regional	Navarre		Euskal Herritarrok	31	Not elected
2019 April general	Navarre		EH Bildu	1	Not elected
2019 November general	Navarre		EH Bildu	1	Elected
