= 2007 Navarrese regional election =

Election in the Spanish region of Navarre

- 27 May 2007

All 50 seats in the Parliament of Navarre 26 seats needed for a majority
- Opinion polls
- Registered: 471,653 ▲1.5%
- Turnout: 348,039 (73.8%) ▲3.1 pp
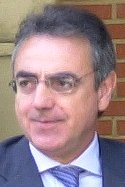

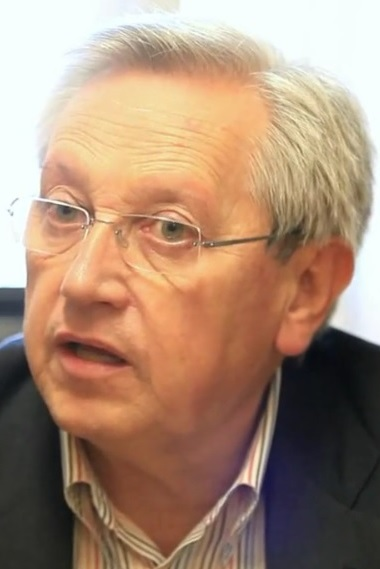

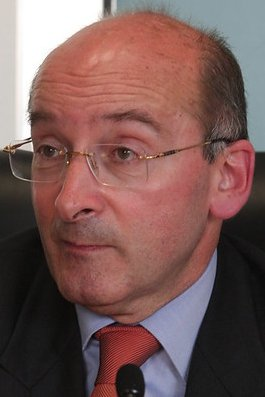

| | First party | Second party | Third party |
|---|---|---|---|
| Leader | Miguel Sanz | Patxi Zabaleta | Fernando Puras |
| Party | UPN | NaBai | PSN–PSOE |
| Leader since | 17 January 1995 | 16 September 2006 | 30 September 2006 |
| Last election | 23 seats, 41.5% | 8 seats, 17.8% (Note: Results for Aralar (7.8%, 4 seats), EA–PNV (7.4%, 4 seats) and Batzarre (2.6%, 0 seats) in the 2003 election.) | 11 seats, 21.2% |
| Seats won | 22 | 12 | 12 |
| Seat change | ▼1 | ▲4 | ▲1 |
| Popular vote | 139,132 | 77,872 | 74,158 |
| Percentage | 42.2% | 23.6% | 22.5% |
| Swing | ▲0.7 pp | ▲5.8 pp | ▲1.3 pp |
| | Fourth party | Fifth party |
| Leader | Juan Cruz Alli | Jon Erro |
| Party | CDN | IUN/NEB |
| Leader since | 10 April 1995 | February 2004 |
| Last election | 4 seats, 7.7% | 4 seats, 8.8% |
| Seats won | 2 | 2 |
| Seat change | ▼2 | ▼2 |
| Popular vote | 14,412 | 14,337 |
| Percentage | 4.4% | 4.3% |
| Swing | ▼3.3 pp | ▼4.5 pp |
President before election
Miguel Sanz
UPN
President after election
Miguel Sanz
UPN

A regional election was held in Navarre on 27 May 2007 to elect the 8th Parliament of the chartered community. All 50 seats in the Parliament were up for election. It was held concurrently with regional elections in twelve other autonomous communities and local elections all across Spain.

The election saw the ruling coalition formed by the Navarrese People's Union (UPN) and Convergence of Democrats of Navarre (CDN) losing the absolute majority it had enjoyed in the previous legislature, with the newly-formed Navarre Yes (NaBai) alliance—formed by Aralar, Basque Solidarity (EA), the Basque Nationalist Party (PNV) and Assembly (Batzarre)—emerging as the second political force in the region, with the Socialist Party of Navarre (PSN–PSOE) coming in a close third place with its best result since 1991. Negotiations for a coalition government between NaBai, PSN–PSOE and United Left (IUN) ensued, with PSN's candidate Fernando Puras being expected to head the cabinet, but the talks were thwarted by decision from the PSOE's national leadership. As a result, Miguel Sanz was able to be re-elected as president of Navarre for a fourth term thanks to the PSN not opposing his investiture.

== Overview ==
Under the 1982 Reintegration and Improvement of the Chartered Regime, the Parliament of Navarre was the unicameral legislature of the homonymous chartered community, having legislative power in devolved matters, as well as the ability to grant or withdraw confidence from a regional president. The electoral and procedural rules were supplemented by national law provisions.

=== Date ===
The term of the Parliament of Navarre expired four years after the date of its previous ordinary election, unless it was dissolved earlier. If no snap election was called before the last year of the legislative term, the election decree was required to be issued no later than 54 days before the scheduled election date and published on the following day in the Official Gazette of Navarre (BON), with election day taking place on the fourth Sunday of May four years after the previous election. The previous election was held on 25 May 2003, setting the latest possible date for election day on the fourth Sunday of May four years later, which was 27 May 2007.

The regional president had the prerogative to dissolve the Parliament of Navarre at any given time and call a snap election, provided that no motion of no confidence was in process, no nationwide election was due and some time requirements are met: namely, that dissolution did not occur either during the first legislative session or during the last year of parliament before its planned expiration, nor before one year after a previous one under this procedure. In the event of an investiture process failing to elect a regional president within a 30-day period from the first ballot, the Parliament was to be automatically dissolved and a fresh election called. Any snap election held as a result of these circumstances did not alter the date of the chamber's next ordinary election, with elected lawmakers serving the remainder of its original four-year term.

The election to the Parliament of Navarre was officially called on 3 April 2007 with the publication of the corresponding decree in the BON, setting election day for 27 May and scheduling for the chamber to reconvene on 20 June.

=== Electoral system ===
Voting for the Parliament was based on universal suffrage, comprising all Spanish nationals over 18 years of age, registered in Navarre and with full political rights, provided that they had not been deprived of the right to vote by a final sentence, nor were legally incapacitated.

The Parliament of Navarre had a minimum of 40 and a maximum of 60 seats, with electoral provisions fixing its size at 50. All were elected in a single multi-member constituency—corresponding to the chartered community's territory—using the D'Hondt method and closed-list proportional voting, with a three percent-threshold of valid votes (including blank ballots) regionally.

The law did not provide for by-elections to fill vacant seats; instead, any vacancies arising after the proclamation of candidates and during the legislative term were filled by the next candidates on the party lists or, when required, by designated substitutes.

=== Outgoing parliament ===
The table below shows the composition of the parliamentary groups in the chamber at the time of the election call.

Parliamentary composition in April 2007
| Groups | Parties | Legislators | |
| Groups | Parties | Seats | Total |
|---|---|---|---|
| Navarrese People's Union Parliamentary Group | UPN | 23 | 23 |
| Socialists of the Parliament of Navarre; Parliamentary Group | PSN–PSOE | 11 | 11 |
| United Left of Navarre Parliamentary Group | IU | 4 | 4 |
| Aralar Parliamentary Group | Aralar | 4 | 4 |
| Convergence of Democrats of Navarre; Parliamentary Group | CDN | 4 | 4 |
| Basque Solidarity Parliamentary Group | EA | 3 | 3 |
| Mixed Group | EAJ/PNV | 1 | 1 |

== Parties and candidates ==
The electoral law allowed for parties and federations registered in the interior ministry, alliances and groupings of electors to present lists of candidates. Parties and federations intending to form a coalition ahead of an election were required to inform the relevant electoral commission within 10 days of the election call, whereas groupings of electors needed to secure the signature of at least one percent of the electorate in Navarre, disallowing electors from signing for more than one list. mendments earlier in 2007 required a balanced composition of men and women in the electoral lists, so that candidates of either sex made up at least 40 percent of the total composition.

Below is a list of the main parties and alliances which contested the election:

| Candidacy | Parties and alliances | Leading candidate | Ideology | Previous result | | Gov. | Ref. |
| Candidacy | Parties and alliances | Leading candidate | Ideology | Vote % | Seats | Gov. | Ref. |
|---|---|---|---|---|---|---|---|
| UPN | List: Navarrese People's Union (UPN) | Miguel Sanz | Conservatism; Christian democracy Regionalism | 41.5% | 23 | Yes | |
| PSN–PSOE | List: Socialist Party of Navarre (PSN–PSOE) | Fernando Puras | Social democracy | 21.2% | 11 | No | |
| NaBai | List: Aralar (Aralar); Basque Solidarity (EA); Basque Nationalist Party (EAJ/PNV); Assembly (Batzarre) | Patxi Zabaleta | Basque nationalism Progressivism | 17.8% | 8 | No | |
| IUN/NEB | List: United Left of Navarre (IUN/NEB) – Communist Party of the Basque Country (PCE/EPK) – Revolutionary Workers' Party (POR) | Jon Erro | Socialism; Communism | 8.8% | 4 | No | |
| CDN | List: Convergence of Democrats of Navarre (CDN) | Juan Cruz Alli | Christian democracy Regionalism | 7.7% | 4 | Yes | |

== Opinion polls ==
The tables below list opinion polling results in reverse chronological order, showing the most recent first and using the dates when the survey fieldwork was done, as opposed to the date of publication. Where the fieldwork dates are unknown, the date of publication is given instead. The highest percentage figure in each polling survey is displayed with its background shaded in the leading party's colour. If a tie ensues, this is applied to the figures with the highest percentages. The "Lead" column on the right shows the percentage-point difference between the parties with the highest percentages in a poll.

=== Voting intention estimates ===
The table below lists weighted voting intention estimates. Refusals are generally excluded from the party vote percentages, while question wording and the treatment of "don't know" responses and those not intending to vote may vary between polling organisations. When available, seat projections determined by the polling organisations are displayed below (or in place of) the percentages in a smaller font; 26 seats were required for an absolute majority in the Parliament of Navarre.

Color key:

Exit poll

| Polling firm/Commissioner | Fieldwork date | Sample size | Turnout | UPN | PSN–PSOE | IUN/NEB | Aralar | CDN | EA | Batzarre | PNV | EAE/ANV | NaBai | Lead |
|---|---|---|---|---|---|---|---|---|---|---|---|---|---|---|
| 2007 regional election | 27 May 2007 | —N/a | 73.8 | 42.2; 22 | 22.5; 12 | 4.3; 2 | (Note: Within NaBai.) | 4.4; 2 | | | | – | 23.6; 12 | 18.6 |
| Ipsos/RTVE–FORTA | 27 May 2007 | ? | ? | 36.8; 19/21 | 22.3; 11/13 | 5.0; 2 | | 3.3; 1 | | | | – | 26.9; 14/16 | 9.9 |
| Opina/El País | 14–17 May 2007 | ? | ? | 40.0; 22 | 26.0; 14 | 5.0; 2 | | 1.4; 0 | | | | – | 23.5; 12 | 14.0 |
| Celeste-Tel/Terra | 9–15 May 2007 | ? | ? | 39.6; 21/22 | 20.1; 11 | 6.9; 3 | | 5.4; 2/3 | | | | – | 23.2; 12/13 | 16.4 |
| CIES/Diario de Navarra | 3–11 May 2007 | 1,505 | 76 | 41.2; 21/23 | 22.1; 11/12 | 5.7; 2/3 | | 5.5; 2/3 | | | | (6.9) | 23.9; 12/13 | 17.3 |
| Opina/Cadena SER | 8 May 2007 | 1,000 | ? | 38.0; 21 | 24.5; 13 | 7.0; 3 | | 3.0; 0 | | | | – | 23.0; 13 | 13.5 |
| Sigma Dos/El Mundo | 27 Apr–8 May 2007 | 500 | ? | 43.3; 22/24 | 23.4; 12/13 | 6.8; 3 | | 3.2; 1 | | | | – | 20.5; 10/11 | 19.9 |
| CIS | 9 Apr–6 May 2007 | 1,189 | ? | 38.7; 20/21 | 18.6; 10 | 6.4; 3 | | 5.9; 3 | | | | – | 25.8; 13/14 | 12.9 |
| TNS Demoscopia/Antena 3 | 2–5 May 2007 | 503 | 71.5 | 43.0; 22/23 | 20.2; 10/11 | 7.2; 3/4 | | 4.8; 2 | | | | 3.6; 0/2 | 20.5; 10/11 | 22.5 |
| Quor/Diario de Noticias | 20–24 Apr 2007 | 1,100 | ? | 37.0; 20/21 | 25.7; 12/13 | 7.0; 3 | | 5.1; 2 | | | | – | 25.0; 12 | 11.3 |
| Intereconomía | 23 Mar 2007 | 1,006 | ? | 46.0; 25 | 20.0; 11 | 7.0; 3 | | 6.0; 3 | | | | – | 15.0; 8 | 26.0 |
| Sigma Dos/El Mundo | 16–24 Nov 2006 | ? | ? | ? 21/23 | ? 10/11 | ? 3 | | ? 2 | | | | – | ? 12/13 | ? |
| CIES/Diario de Navarra | 25 Oct–6 Nov 2006 | 960 | 72 | 40.7; 21 | 21.9; 11 | 8.2; 4 | | 7.4; 3 | | | | – | 20.9; 11 | 18.8 |
| CIES/Diario de Navarra | 25 Oct–6 Nov 2006 | 960 | 72 | 39.4; 21 | 21.2; 11 | 7.9; 4 | | 7.2; 3 | | | | 5.6; 2 | 17.8; 9 | 18.2 |
| CIES/Diario de Navarra | 18–30 May 2006 | 1,600 | 72 | 38.1; 21 | 21.6; 12 | 8.5; 4 | 8.9; 4 | 5.7; 3 | 5.0; 2 | 3.1; 1 | 2.4; 0 | 6.3; 3 | – | 16.5 |
| CIES/Diario de Navarra | 28 Sep–5 Oct 2005 | 800 | ? | 41.0; 22 | 25.2; 13 | 8.1; 4 | 10.1; 5 | 5.5; 2 | 6.4; 3 | 3.0; 1 | (Note: Within EA.) | – | – | 15.8 |
| CIES/Diario de Navarra | 28 Sep–5 Oct 2005 | 800 | ? | 39.2; 22 | 24.1; 13 | 7.5; 3 | 8.9; 4 | 5.3; 2 | 6.2; 3 | 2.1; 0 | | 6.0; 3 | – | 15.1 |
| 2004 EP election | 13 Jun 2004 | —N/a | 46.2 | 45.2 (25) | 34.9 (19) | 4.3 (2) | 4.4 (2) | 0.9 (0) | 4.8 (2) | – | 2.1 (0) | – | – | 10.3 |
| 2004 general election | 14 Mar 2004 | —N/a | 76.2 | 37.6 (20) | 33.6 (18) | 5.9 (3) | | 1.4 (0) | | | | – | 18.0 (9) | 4.0 |
| 2003 regional election | 25 May 2003 | —N/a | 70.7 | 41.5; 23 | 21.2; 11 | 8.8; 4 | 7.8; 4 | 7.7; 4 | 7.4; 4 | 2.6; 0 | | – | – | 20.3 |

=== Voting preferences ===
The table below lists raw, unweighted voting preferences.

| Polling firm/Commissioner | Fieldwork date | Sample size | UPN | PSN–PSOE | IUN/NEB | Aralar | CDN | EA | NaBai | Question | X mark | Lead |
|---|---|---|---|---|---|---|---|---|---|---|---|---|
| 2007 regional election (Note: Does not include non-resident citizens.) | 27 May 2007 | —N/a | 30.1 | 16.0 | 3.1 | | 3.1 | | 16.9 | —N/a | 24.6 | 13.2 |
| CIS | 9 Apr–6 May 2007 | 1,189 | 21.1 | 12.4 | 2.9 | | 1.6 | | 12.5 | 35.2 | 8.8 | 8.6 |
| 2004 EP election | 13 Jun 2004 | —N/a | 19.7 | 15.1 | 1.9 | 1.9 | 0.4 | 2.1 | – | —N/a | 53.1 | 4.6 |
| 2004 general election | 14 Mar 2004 | —N/a | 27.8 | 24.9 | 4.4 | | 1.2 | | 13.4 | —N/a | 22.4 | 2.9 |
| 2003 regional election | 25 May 2003 | —N/a | 28.0 | 14.3 | 5.9 | 5.2 | 5.2 | 5.0 | – | —N/a | 27.7 | 13.7 |

=== Victory preferences ===
The table below lists opinion polling on the victory preferences for each party in the event of a regional election taking place.

| Polling firm/Commissioner | Fieldwork date | Sample size | UPN | PSN–PSOE | IUN/NEB | CDN | NaBai | Other/ None | Question | Lead |
|---|---|---|---|---|---|---|---|---|---|---|
| Opina/Cadena SER | 8 May 2007 | 1,000 | 29.4 | 21.3 | 4.1 | 1.3 | 17.2 | 7.2 | 19.5 | 8.1 |
| CIS | 9 Apr–6 May 2007 | 1,189 | 26.2 | 18.6 | 3.5 | 1.5 | 15.5 | 12.8 | 21.9 | 7.6 |

=== Victory likelihood ===
The table below lists opinion polling on the perceived likelihood of victory for each party in the event of a regional election taking place.

| Polling firm/Commissioner | Fieldwork date | Sample size | UPN | PSN–PSOE | IUN/NEB | CDN | NaBai | Other/ None | Question | Lead |
|---|---|---|---|---|---|---|---|---|---|---|
| Opina/Cadena SER | 8 May 2007 | 1,000 | 56.8 | 13.7 | 0.5 | 0.2 | 3.0 | 0.4 | 25.4 | 43.1 |
| CIS | 9 Apr–6 May 2007 | 1,189 | 61.2 | 8.7 | 0.1 | 0.1 | 1.6 | 1.2 | 27.2 | 52.5 |

=== Preferred President ===
The table below lists opinion polling on leader preferences to become president of the Government of Navarre.

| Polling firm/Commissioner | Fieldwork date | Sample size | | | | | | Other/ None/ Not care | Question | Lead |
| Polling firm/Commissioner | Fieldwork date | Sample size | Sanz UPN | Puras PSN | Erro IUN | Alli CDN | Zabaleta NaBai | Other/ None/ Not care | Question | Lead |
|---|---|---|---|---|---|---|---|---|---|---|
| CIS | 9 Apr–6 May 2007 | 1,189 | 27.4 | 13.8 | 2.8 | 4.9 | 13.8 | 4.1 | 33.2 | 13.6 |

== Results ==
← Summary of the 27 May 2007 Parliament of Navarre election results →
| Parties and alliances | Popular vote | | | Seats | |
| Parties and alliances | Votes | % | ±pp | Total | +/− |
|---|---|---|---|---|---|
| Navarrese People's Union (UPN) | 139,132 | 42.19 | +0.71 | 22 | −1 |
| Navarre Yes (NaBai)^{1} | 77,872 | 23.62 | +5.80 | 12 | +4 |
| Socialist Party of Navarre (PSN–PSOE) | 74,158 | 22.49 | +1.34 | 12 | +1 |
| Convergence of Democrats of Navarre (CDN) | 14,412 | 4.37 | −3.28 | 2 | −2 |
| United Left of Navarre (IUN/NEB) | 14,337 | 4.35 | −4.43 | 2 | −2 |
| Navarrese Cannabis Representation (RCN/NOK) | 4,705 | 1.43 | New | 0 | ±0 |
| Carlist Party (EKA) | 541 | 0.16 | −0.17 | 0 | ±0 |
| Blank ballots | 4,581 | 1.39 | −0.99 | | |
| Total | 329,738 | | | 50 | ±0 |
| Valid votes | 329,738 | 94.74 | +1.22 | | |
| Invalid votes | 18,301 | 5.26 | −1.22 | | |
| Votes cast / turnout | 348,039 | 73.79 | +3.09 | | |
| Abstentions | 123,614 | 26.21 | −3.09 | | |
| Registered voters | 471,653 | | | | |
Sources
Footnotes: ^{1} Navarre Yes results are compared to the combined totals of Aralar, Basque Solidarity–Basque Nationalist Party and Assembly in the 2003 election.

Popular vote
| UPN | 42.19% |
| NaBai | 23.62% |
| PSN–PSOE | 22.49% |
| CDN | 4.37% |
| IUN/NEB | 4.35% |
| RCN/NOK | 1.43% |
| EKA | 0.16% |
| Blank ballots | 1.39% |

Seats
| UPN | 44.00% |
| NaBai | 24.00% |
| PSN–PSOE | 24.00% |
| CDN | 4.00% |
| IUN/NEB | 4.00% |

== Aftermath ==
=== Government formation ===
Investiture; Nomination of Miguel Sanz (UPN)
| Ballot → | 10 August 2007 (Note: 1 PSN MP cast an invalid ballot in the 10 August vote; 11 PSN MPs cast blank ballots on 12 August.) | 11 August 2007 |
| Required majority → | 26 out of 50 | Simple |
| Yes: • UPN (22); • CDN (2) | 24 / 50 | 24 / 50 |
| No: • NaBai (12); • PSN (11) (on 10 Aug); • IUN (2) | 25 / 50 | 14 / 50 |
| Abstentions: • PSN (1) (on 12 Aug) | 0 / 50 | 1 / 50 |
| Absentees | 0 / 50 | 0 / 50 |

== Bibliography ==
- Ley Orgánica 13/1982, de 10 de agosto, de reintegración y amejoramiento del Régimen Foral de Navarra (Organic Law 13/1982). Official State Gazette (in Spanish). 10 August 1982 [version as of 28 March 2001]. BOE-A-1982-20824.
- Ley Orgánica 5/1985, de 19 de junio, del Régimen Electoral General (Organic Law 5/1985). Official State Gazette (in Spanish). 19 June 1985 [version as of 20 April 2007]. BOE-A-1985-11672.
- Ley Foral 16/1986, de 17 de noviembre, reguladora de las elecciones al Parlamento de Navarra (Foral Law 16/1986). Official State Gazette (in Spanish). 17 November 1986 [version as of 11 June 2004]. BOE-A-1987-1255.
- Ley Foral 14/2004, de 3 de diciembre, del Gobierno de Navarra y de su Presidente (Foral Law 14/2004). Official State Gazette (in Spanish). 3 December 2004 [version as of 15 December 2004]. BOE-A-2005-1576.
- Decreto Foral 4/2007, de 2 de abril, del Presidente del Gobierno de Navarra, por el que se convocan elecciones al Parlamento de Navarra (Foral Decree 4/2007). Official State Gazette (in Spanish). 2 April 2007. BOE-A-2007-7028.
