= Pernando Barrena =

Spanish politician (born 1965)

Pernando Barrena MEP
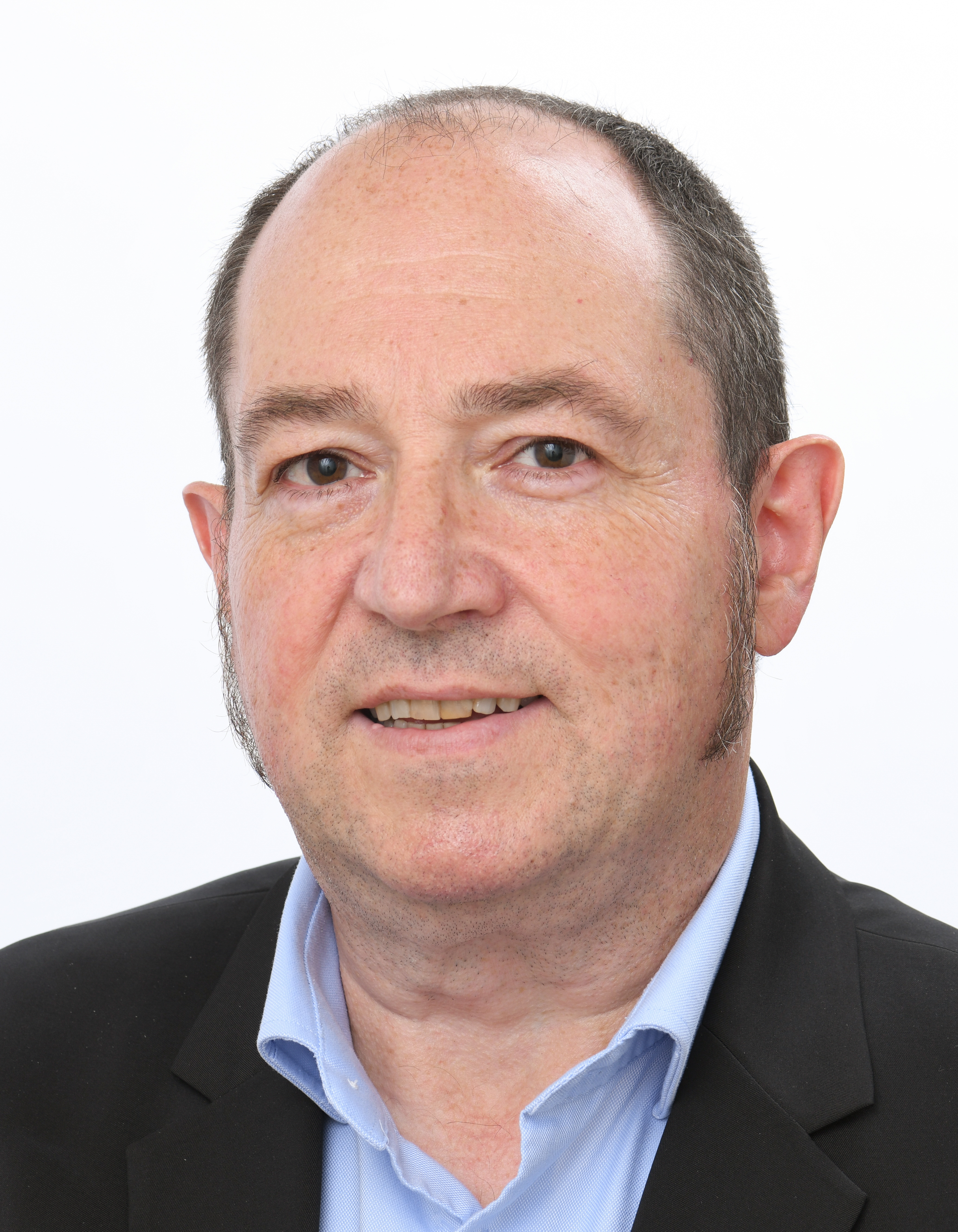
- Barrena in 2024

Member of the European Parliament for Spain
- Incumbent
- Assumed office 16 July 2024
- In office 2 July 2019 – 2 September 2022
- Succeeded by: Ana Miranda Paz

Member of the Parliament of Navarre
- In office 2 July 1999 – 25 May 2003

Member of Berriozar Municipal Council
- In office 8 May 1983 – 13 June 1999

Personal details
- Born: Joxe Pernando Barrena Arza; 1 November 1965 (age 60) Pamplona, Navarre, Spain
- Party: Sortu (2011–present); EH Bildu (2012–present)
- Other political affiliations: Herri Batasuna (1983–1998); Euskal Herritarrok (1998–2001); Batasuna (2001–2011)

Joxe Pernando Barrena Arza (Basque: [perˈnando βaˈrena]; born 1 November 1965) is a Spanish politician, former member of the Parliament of Navarre and member of the European Parliament for Spain.

== Early life ==
Barrena was born on 1 November 1965 in Pamplona, Navarre. His father José María Barrena Inza was a socialist mayor of Berriozar. He has Técnico Superior qualification in international trade and a degree in international relations from UOC.

== Career ==
Barrena is a translator by profession and worked at the Txalaparta publishing house in Tafalla translating Basque and English.

Barrena joined Abertzale left (Ezker abertzalea) as a youth. He was a municipal councillor in Berriozar from 1984 to 1999.

Barrena was first arrested in 1985 for alleged links to the terrorist organization Euskadi Ta Askatasuna (ETA). During the police detention Barrena suffered tortures from the Spanish National Police Corps.

In 1998, he along with Arnaldo Otegi and Joseba Permach, came to public prominence after the previous leadership of Herri Batasuna (HB) were jailed for alleged links to ETA. Barrena's language skills resulted in him representing HB on an international level. He became a member of HB's national executive in 1998 and was the party's spokesperson from 2001 to 2008. He contested the 1999 regional election in Navarre as an Euskal Herritarrok electoral alliance candidate and was elected to the Parliament of Navarre.

In 2001 Barrena became a member of the national executive of the newly formed Batasuna, the successor to HB which had been dissolved. He was the lead candidate at the 2003 regional election in Navarre for the Autodeterminaziorako Bilgunea (AuB) electoral alliance but the Supreme Court annulled the list as it considered AuB to be a successor to Batasuna which had been banned in March 2003.

Following the death of two ETA prisoners, Igor Angulo Iturrate and Roberto Sainz del Olmo, Basque nationalists, who did not believe the official version of the deaths given by the Spanish government and instead believed they died because of tortures suffered after their arrests, organised a strike in March 2006. All demonstrations were banned by the Basque government. This resulted in clashes between protesters and the Ertzaintza police across the Southern Basque Country. Barrena and other leaders of Batasuna were arrested on the orders of judge Fernando Grande-Marlaska who held them responsible for attacks by the strikers. Barrena was released after paying a bail of €200,000, but the charges were ultimately dropped, as no links between the two could be proven.

Barrena was a candidate at the 2007 regional election in Navarre for the Nafarroako Abertzale Sozialistak electoral alliance which was also annulled by the Supreme Court. On 4 February 2008 a conference was held at the Hotel Tres Reyes, Pamplona involving Batasuna, Basque Nationalist Party and Socialist Party of the Basque Country–Basque Country Left which was attended by Batasuna leaders Barrena, Patxi Urrutia and Unai Fano. Barrena and Urrutia were arrested on 4 February 2008 on the orders of judge Baltasar Garzón for "supporting the activity of an illegal political party". Barrena was released on 3 February 2010 after paying a bail of €50,000.

Barrena was co-spokesperson for Sortu from 2012 to 2016. In April 2019 he was chosen by EH Bildu to be its leading candidate at the 2019 European Parliament election in Spain following the resignation of Josu Juaristi. He contested the election as an Orain Errepublikak electoral alliance candidate in Spain and was elected to the European Parliament.

He left the European Parliament in September 2022 to enable a member of Galician Nationalist Block to take up the seat but was reelected in 2024, and with an increased share of the alliance's vote coming from the Basque Country he is expected to serve a full term.

== Electoral history ==
Electoral history of Pernando Barrena
Election	Constituency	Party	Alliance	No.	Result
1999 regional	Navarre	Herri Batasuna	Euskal Herritarrok	1	Elected
2019 European	Spain	Euskal Herria Bildu	Ahora Repúblicas	2	Elected
