= 2003 Spanish regional elections =

- 25 May 2003; 26 October 2003 (Note: The Community of Madrid was forced to hold a snap election on 26 October 2003 after the Tamayazo scandal led to no new government being elected following the May election.); 16 November 2003

927 seats in the regional parliaments of Aragon, Asturias, Balearic Islands, Canary Islands, Cantabria, Castile and León, Castilla–La Mancha, Catalonia, Extremadura, La Rioja, Madrid, Murcia, Navarre and Valencian Community
Regional administrations by leading party in 2003
National parties
PP (7+2)
PSOE (5)
Regional parties
PSC (Note: PSOE's sister party in Catalonia.) (1)
EAJ/PNV (1)
CC (1)
UPN (Note: PP's sister party in Navarre.) (1)
PRC (1)

Regional elections were held in Spain during 2003 to elect the regional parliaments of fourteen of the seventeen autonomous communities: Aragon, Asturias, the Balearic Islands, the Canary Islands, Cantabria, Castile and León, Castilla–La Mancha, Catalonia, Extremadura, La Rioja, Madrid, Murcia, Navarre, the Valencian Community. 927 of 1,186 seats in the regional parliaments were up for election. The elections were held on 25 May for most regions (concurrently with local elections all across the country), on 26 October for a repeat election in Madrid, and on 16 November in Catalonia.

== Election date ==
Determination of election day varied depending on the autonomous community. Typically, most autonomous communities held their elections on the fourth Sunday of May every four years, concurrently with nationwide local elections, while others had their own, separate electoral cycles. In some cases, regional presidents had the prerogative to dissolve parliament and call for extra elections at a different time, but newly elected assemblies were restricted to serving out what remained of their previous four year-terms without altering the period to their next ordinary election. In other cases—Andalusia (since 1994), the Basque Country (1981), Catalonia (1985) and Galicia (1985)—the law granted regional presidents the power to call snap elections resulting in fresh four-year parliamentary terms.

== Regional governments ==
The following table lists party control in autonomous communities. Gains for a party are highlighted in that party's colour.

Election day	Region	Previous control	New control
25 May	Aragon	Spanish Socialist Workers' Party (PSOE)	Spanish Socialist Workers' Party (PSOE)
25 May	Asturias	Spanish Socialist Workers' Party (PSOE)	Spanish Socialist Workers' Party (PSOE)
25 May	Balearic Islands	Spanish Socialist Workers' Party (PSOE)	People's Party (PP)
25 May	Canary Islands	Canarian Coalition (CC)	Canarian Coalition (CC)
25 May	Cantabria	People's Party (PP)	Regionalist Party of Cantabria (PRC)
25 May	Castile and León	People's Party (PP)	People's Party (PP)
25 May	Castilla–La Mancha	Spanish Socialist Workers' Party (PSOE)	Spanish Socialist Workers' Party (PSOE)
25 May	Extremadura	Spanish Socialist Workers' Party (PSOE)	Spanish Socialist Workers' Party (PSOE)
25 May	La Rioja	People's Party (PP)	People's Party (PP)
25 May	Madrid	People's Party (PP)	Inconclusive
25 May	Murcia	People's Party (PP)	People's Party (PP)
25 May	Navarre	Navarrese People's Union (UPN)	Navarrese People's Union (UPN)
25 May	Valencian Community	People's Party (PP)	People's Party (PP)
26 October	Madrid	People's Party (PP)	People's Party (PP)
16 November	Catalonia	Convergence and Union (CiU)	Socialists' Party of Catalonia (PSC)

== Summary by region ==
=== May (13 regions) ===
==== Aragon ====
Parties and alliances	Votes	%	±pp	Seats	+/−
PSOE	270,468	37.94	+7.13	27	+4
PP	219,058	30.73	−7.48	22	−6
CHA	97,763	13.71	+2.67	9	+4
PAR	79,670	11.18	−2.07	8	−2
IU	21,795	3.06	−0.80	1	±0
Others	9,216	1.29		0	±0
Blank ballots	14,874	2.09	+0.01		
Valid votes	712,844	99.36	+0.07		
Invalid votes	4,613	0.64	−0.07		
Votes cast / turnout	717,457	70.36	+5.76		
Registered voters	1,019,644				

==== Asturias ====
Parties and alliances	Votes	%	±pp	Seats	+/−
PSOE	250,474	40.48	−5.52	22	−2
PP	242,396	39.18	+6.87	19	+4
IU–BA	68,360	11.05	+2.05	4	+1
URAS	17,552	2.84	−4.30	0	−3
PAS	11,376	1.84	−0.74	0	±0
LV–IVA	6,561	1.06	+0.52	0	±0
Others	7,854	1.27		0	±0
Blank ballots	14,143	2.29	+0.72		
Valid votes	618,716	99.29	−0.11		
Invalid votes	4,433	0.71	+0.11		
Votes cast / turnout	623,149	63.84	+0.22		
Registered voters	976,104				

==== Balearic Islands ====
Parties and alliances	Votes	%	±pp	Seats	+/−
PP	190,562	44.70	+0.69	29	+1
PSIB–PSOE	104,614	24.54	+2.52	15	+2
PSM–EN	33,920	7.95	−3.77	4	−1
UM	31,781	7.45	+0.14	3	±0
EU–EV	20,797	4.88	−0.55	2	−1
Pacte+COP	16,811	3.94	−0.91	5	−2
ASI	6,707	1.57	+0.92	0	±0
AIPF	1,647	0.39	+0.07	1	+1
Others	12,408	2.91		0	±0
Blank ballots	7,093	1.66	−0.20		
Valid votes	426,340	99.35	+0.13		
Invalid votes	2,795	0.65	−0.13		
Votes cast / turnout	429,135	62.84	+5.34		
Registered voters	682,857				

==== Canary Islands ====
Parties and alliances	Votes	%	±pp	Seats	+/−
CC	304,413	32.90	−4.36	23	−3
PP	283,186	30.61	+3.48	17	+2
PSOE	235,234	25.42	+1.39	17	−2
FNC	44,703	4.83	+0.02	3	+3
LVC	18,340	1.98	+0.52	0	±0
IUC	12,128	1.31	−1.43	0	±0
Others	15,438	1.67		0	±0
Blank ballots	11,806	1.28	−0.23		
Valid votes	925,248	99.44	+0.02		
Invalid votes	5,201	0.56	−0.02		
Votes cast / turnout	930,449	64.59	+3.79		
Registered voters	1,440,576				

==== Cantabria ====
Parties and alliances	Votes	%	±pp	Seats	+/−
PP	146,796	42.49	−0.01	18	−1
PSOE	103,608	29.99	−3.09	13	−1
PRC	66,480	19.24	+5.73	8	+2
IUC	12,770	3.70	+0.01	0	±0
UCn	5,515	1.60	New	0	±0
Others	3,147	0.91		0	±0
Blank ballots	7,202	2.08	−0.35		
Valid votes	345,518	99.18	−0.03		
Invalid votes	2,859	0.82	+0.03		
Votes cast / turnout	348,377	73.05	+4.27		
Registered voters	476,924				

==== Castile and León ====
Parties and alliances	Votes	%	±pp	Seats	+/−
PP	760,510	48.49	−1.96	48	±0
PSOE	576,769	36.77	+3.71	32	+2
UPL	60,331	3.85	+0.15	2	−1
IUCyL	54,085	3.45	−1.98	0	−1
TC–PNC	18,595	1.19	−0.20	0	−1
Others	62,109	3.96		0	±0
Blank ballots	36,027	2.30	−0.37		
Valid votes	1,568,426	99.14	+0.09		
Invalid votes	13,557	0.86	−0.09		
Votes cast / turnout	1,581,983	72.66	+5.08		
Registered voters	2,177,222				

==== Castilla–La Mancha ====
Parties and alliances	Votes	%	±pp	Seats	+/−
PSOE	634,132	57.83	+4.41	29	+3
PP	402,047	36.66	−3.74	18	−3
IU–ICAM	33,413	3.05	−0.36	0	±0
Others	12,438	1.13		0	±0
Blank ballots	14,554	1.33	−0.09		
Valid votes	1,096,584	99.32	±0.00		
Invalid votes	7,534	0.68	±0.00		
Votes cast / turnout	1,104,118	76.24	+1.39		
Registered voters	1,448,289				

==== Extremadura ====
Parties and alliances	Votes	%	±pp	Seats	+/−
PSOE–p	341,522	51.66	+2.03	36	+2
PP	255,808	38.70	−1.31	26	−2
IU–SIEx	41,448	6.27	−0.74	3	±0
EU	12,171	1.84	+0.17	0	±0
PH	1,082	0.16	New	0	±0
Blank ballots	9,033	1.37	+0.22		
Valid votes	661,064	99.19	−0.19		
Invalid votes	5,404	0.81	+0.19		
Votes cast / turnout	666,468	75.63	+2.19		
Registered voters	881,228				

==== La Rioja ====
Parties and alliances	Votes	%	±pp	Seats	+/−
PP	84,533	48.60	−2.66	17	−1
PSOE	66,410	38.18	+2.90	14	+1
PR	11,842	6.81	+1.05	2	±0
IU	4,729	2.72	−1.19	0	±0
LV	2,858	1.64	+0.38	0	±0
MASH	269	0.15	−0.12	0	±0
Blank ballots	3,308	1.90	−0.36		
Valid votes	173,949	99.17	+0.04		
Invalid votes	1,452	0.83	−0.04		
Votes cast / turnout	175,401	75.10	+6.44		
Registered voters	233,553				

==== Madrid ====
Parties and alliances	Votes	%	±pp	Seats	+/−
PP	1,429,890	46.67	−4.40	55	±0
PSOE	1,225,390	39.99	+3.56	47	+8
IUCM	235,428	7.68	−0.01	9	+1
LV	42,322	1.38	+0.69	0	±0
Others	70,108	2.29		0	±0
Blank ballots	60,942	1.99	−0.11		
Valid votes	3,064,080	99.55	+0.04		
Invalid votes	13,972	0.45	−0.04		
Votes cast / turnout	3,078,052	69.27	+8.39		
Registered voters	4,443,533				

==== Murcia ====
Parties and alliances	Votes	%	±pp	Seats	+/−
PP	367,710	56.66	+3.82	28	+2
PSOE	221,392	34.11	−1.80	16	−2
IURM	36,754	5.66	−1.34	1	±0
LVRM	10,208	1.57	+0.64	0	±0
Others	3,024	0.47		0	±0
Blank ballots	9,941	1.53	+0.09		
Valid votes	649,029	99.20	−0.10		
Invalid votes	5,224	0.80	+0.10		
Votes cast / turnout	654,253	69.98	+2.32		
Registered voters	934,896				

==== Navarre ====
Parties and alliances	Votes	%	±pp	Seats	+/−
UPN	127,460	41.48	+0.11	23	+1
PSN–PSOE	65,003	21.15	+0.87	11	±0
IUN/NEB	26,962	8.77	+1.89	4	+1
Aralar	24,068	7.83	New	4	+4
CDN	23,516	7.65	+0.79	4	+1
EA–PNV	22,824	7.43	+1.99	4	+1
Batzarre	7,873	2.56	New	0	±0
EH	n/a	n/a	−15.58	0	−8
Others	2,307	0.75		0	±0
Blank ballots	7,304	2.38	+0.03		
Valid votes	307,317	93.52	−5.65		
Invalid votes	21,292	6.48	+5.65		
Votes cast / turnout	328,609	70.70	+4.45		
Registered voters	464,826				

==== Valencian Community ====
Parties and alliances	Votes	%	±pp	Seats	+/−
PP	1,146,780	47.17	−0.71	48	−1
PSPV–PSOE	874,288	35.96	+2.05	35	±0
Entesa	154,494	6.35	+0.30	6	+1
Bloc–EV	114,011	4.69	+0.16	0	±0
UV	72,557	2.98	−1.70	0	±0
Others	31,468	1.29		0	±0
Blank ballots	37,805	1.55	±0.00		
Valid votes	2,431,403	99.35	−0.06		
Invalid votes	15,821	0.65	+0.06		
Votes cast / turnout	2,447,224	71.49	+3.68		
Registered voters	3,423,098				

=== October (Madrid) ===
Parties and alliances	Votes	%	±pp	Seats	+/−
PP	1,346,588	48.48	+1.81	57	+2
PSOE	1,083,205	39.00	−0.99	45	−2
IUCM	236,013	8.50	+0.82	9	±0
Others	63,383	2.28		0	±0
Blank ballots	48,433	1.74	−0.25		
Valid votes	2,777,622	99.61	+0.06		
Invalid votes	10,873	0.39	−0.06		
Votes cast / turnout	2,788,495	62.58	−6.69		
Registered voters	4,455,706				

=== November (Catalonia) ===
Parties and alliances	Votes	%	±pp	Seats	+/−
PSC–CpC	1,031,454	31.16	−6.69	42	−10
CiU	1,024,425	30.94	−6.76	46	−10
ERC	544,324	16.44	+7.77	23	+11
PP	393,499	11.89	+2.38	15	+3
ICV–EA	241,163	7.28	+3.35	9	+6
Others	45,406	1.37		0	±0
Blank ballots	30,212	0.91	−0.02		
Valid votes	3,310,483	99.74	−0.01		
Invalid votes	8,793	0.26	+0.01		
Votes cast / turnout	3,319,276	62.54	+3.34		
Registered voters	5,307,837				

== Bibliography ==
- Ley Orgánica 5/1985, de 19 de junio, del Régimen Electoral General (Organic Law 5/1985). Official State Gazette (in Spanish). 19 June 1985 [version as of 11 March 2003]. BOE-A-1985-11672.
