= 2003 Spanish elections =

2003 Spanish elections may refer to one of two nationwide elections held in Spain on 25 May 2003:

- 2003 Spanish local elections, to elect local seats in Spanish municipalities, provinces and island councils.
- 2003 Spanish regional elections, to elect the regional parliaments of thirteen autonomous communities.
