= Eusko Alkartasuna =

Basque Solidarity Basque: Eusko Alkartasuna Spanish: Solidaridad Vasca French: Solidarité basque
- Abbreviation: EA
- Leader: Eva Blanco
- Founder: Carlos Garaikoetxea
- Founded: September 1986
- Split from: Basque Nationalist Party
- Headquarters: San Sebastián, Basque Country, Spain
- Youth wing: Young Patriots
- Ideology: Basque nationalism Basque independence Social democracy
- Political position: Centre-left
- National affiliation: PNV–EA (1999–2006); Nafarroa Bai (2004–2011); Amaiur (2011–2015); EH Bildu (since 2011)
- European affiliation: European Free Alliance
- Colours: Green; Carmine
- Congress of Deputies: 0 / 350
- Senate: 1 / 266
- European Parliament: 0 / 61
- Basque Parliament: 4 / 75
- Parliament of Navarre: 1 / 50
- Juntas Generales: 6 / 153
- Municipal councils (provincial capitals): 5 / 110

Website
- euskoalkartasuna.eus

Eusko Alkartasuna (Basque pronunciation: [eus̺ko alkartas̺una]; English: Basque Solidarity; Spanish: Solidaridad Vasca; French: Solidarité basque) is a Basque nationalist and social-democratic political party on the centre-left political spectrum operating in Spain and France. The Basque language name means Basque Solidarity and abbreviated as EA. The party describes itself as a "Basque nationalist, democratic, popular, progressive and non-denominational party". The party has adopted the slogan "Euskal Sozialdemokrazia" ("Basque social democracy").

According to their statute, they are striving to achieve "full national and social freedom in and for the Basque Country". They support the creation of an independent Basque Country along the avenues provided by the European Union, as a union of peoples, a federation of nations, not states. The youth wing of the party is the Young Patriots (Gazte Abertzaleak).

== Origin ==
Even though the idea for a Basque national political party separate from both Herri Batasuna and the Partido Nacionalista Vasco (PNV, Basque: Euzko Alderdi-Jeltzalea, "Basque Nationalist Party") emerged in 1986, it was not until 1987 that the first congress of the party was held in Pamplona-Iruña in 1987. Carlos Garaikoetxea was then elected as the party's first president.

The split from the PNV was based on:

- A personality clash between the lehendakari (Basque President) Garaikoetxea (who went to form EA) and the PNV leader Xabier Arzalluz.
- The configuration of the Basque Country: A strong Basque government and weak provinces (EA) / Strong provinces (PNV).
- social-democratic (EA) / Christian-democratic (PNV)

The split was particularly bitter given that the new party was headed by the lehendakari himself. Every local organization had to vote on whether to go to EA or remain in PNV. Many PNV political bars (batzoki, "meeting place") became alkartetxe ("mutual house"). Ramón Doral, an ertzain (Basque policeman) closely connected to PNV was convicted of wiretapping EA leaders for PNV.

=== Name ===
When dissident members of the Basque Nationalist Party (EAJ-PNV) reached the conclusion that they needed to form a new party, they talked about taking the name of Eusko Abertzaleak–Nacionalistas Vascos ("Basque Nationalists"), but that name had been registered by another group on 3 October 1986. Deprived of that choice, EA founders presumably sought another name reminiscent of both EAJ and the largest trade union of the Basque Country Eusko Langileen Alkartasuna. The name Eusko Alkartasuna was registered on 10 October 1986.

The standard Basque for "solidarity" is elkartasun. Alkartasun is a Gipuzkoan form. At the time of foundation, "EE" was used by Euskadiko Ezkerra; this alternative form of the word was used so as not to have two parties with the same initials.

== Recent years and representation ==
=== Basque Autonomous Community ===
In 1991, after the merger of Euskadiko Ezkerra with the PSOE, a small group of dissidents from that defunct party grouped under the name Euskal Ezkerra and went to join EA.

EA lost nearly 50% of its electoral support between 1986 and 1998 (from 15.84% to 8.69% in the Basque Autonomous Community and from 7.1% to 4.56% in Navarre). In 2009, EA obtained its worst to date results in this Autonomous Community (3.68% of the total votes) and only one MP at the regional Basque parliament (down from seven MPs in the previous election).

With the schism produced after the 2009 elections (Hamaikabat), the role of EA in the Basque Autonomous Community has been greatly diminished, since most of the party members who left were in Guipuzcoa, which was the province that EA used to count as its stronghold.

=== Navarre ===
In Navarre, where Basque nationalism is minority, EA run in a coalition with the PNV in 1999 and 2003 in order to maximize the results of Basque nationalism in this Foral Community. Then in 2004 EA ceased to run regional elections by itself and went to form the coalition Nafarroa Bai (Navarre Yes) along PNV and other Basque nationalist parties (such as Aralar or Batzarre), who also dropped their own tickets to merge into Nafarroa Bai. 4 of the MPs of Nafarroa Bai at the Navarrese regional parliament were EA members in 2007–2011, which made this territory the most important for EA in terms of institutional representation. After EA was forced to leave Nafarroa Bai due to having signed an agreement with the Abertzale Left, it founded the coalition Bildu, later known as EH Bildu. In the 2015-19 period, 3 out of 50 members of parliament belong to EA. They were elected as part of the coalition EH Bildu, which received 14,25% of the popular vote and 8 MEPs overall.

=== Relations with the PNV in the Basque Autonomous Community ===
By 1991, helped by the fact that both opposing characters Arzalluz and Garaikoetxea had gone into political retirement, time had eased the bitter split from the PNV and both parties agreed to form an electoral coalition in a number of regional and local elections as a means to maximize the nationalist votes, which eventually led them to present a joint list for the regional governments of the Basque Autonomous Community in 1998.

Thus, EA has participated since in several PNV-led Basque regional governments. Still, that option was ruled out when EA decided to run again by itself in the municipal elections of May 2007, taking 7% of the vote in the Basque Autonomous Community. This decision was then confirmed when EA decided to also run by itself the 2009 regional elections in the Basque country, ten years after their first coalition with the PNV.

The party split between those advocating for the breakup with the PNV and aiming at the independentist radical vote and those (especially the Gipuzkoa ranks) who would have preferred to keep the pact with the PNV. Eventually the election supposed a severe setback for EA, which obtained only one MP at the Basque regional parliament and its lowest support to date. Unai Ziarreta, then leader and proponent of parting ways with the PNV resigned as a result and EA started a period marked by internal unrest.

=== At the Spanish Parliament ===
In the 2004 Spanish general election, the party won one seat in the congress of the Spanish parliament, from the constituency of Guipuzcoa, with some 80,000 votes. Then, at the 2008 Spanish general election EA failed to keep their MP elected for Guipuzcoa at the Spanish parliament. Currently is only represented as a part of the Nafarroa Bai coalition, which has one MP, elected for Navarre.

=== European Parliament ===
EA called for a "No" vote on the European Constitution proposal in the referendums held in Spain and France in 2005.

Eusko Alkartasuna has coalesced with Republican Left of Catalonia (ERC) for elections to European Parliament. EA's Mikel Irujo is MEP since July 2007 till July 2009 for the European Free Alliance.

== 2009 Schism ==
EA's support in Basque politics has greatly diminished since it was created in 1986 as a schism of the Basque Nationalist Party. In 2009, the party held one MP at the Basque regional parliament and some 20 mayors in the Basque Autonomous Community (where it went from 181,000 votes in the 1986 regional election down to 37,820 in 2009), getting four MPs in the Parliament of Navarre as part of the coalition Nafarroa Bai.

Following poor results in the latest Basque Autonomous Community elections, the party split amid bitter recriminations. The majority upheld the existing strategy of distancing the party from the PNV and a rapprochement with the left-wing pro-independence movement, but a critical current, consisting of around 35% of the party's members, who stood for a return to a milder brand of Basque nationalism and the renewal of ties with the PNV, announced their decision to leave EA and form a new party, the short-lived Hamaikabat (a Basque language pun meaning variety and unity, brief H1!). Most of the members of the breakaway group were from the province of Gipuzkoa, hitherto considered EA's main stronghold.

After ETA's permanent ceasefire declarations (2010-2011), EA confirmed its alliance with other Basque nationalist left forces, a move resulting in the establishment of the electoral platform Bildu (2011) and the coalition EH Bildu (2012) under the leadership of Peio Urizar.

== Electoral performance ==
=== Basque Parliament ===
Basque Parliament
Election	Leading candidate	Votes	%	Seats	+/–	Government
1986	Carlos Garaikoetxea	181,175	15.77 (#4)	13 / 75	13	Opposition
1990	Carlos Garaikoetxea	115,703	11.30 (#4)	9 / 75	4	Coalition (1990–1991)
1990	Carlos Garaikoetxea	115,703	11.30 (#4)	9 / 75	4	Opposition (1991–1994)
1994	Carlos Garaikoetxea	105,136	10.13 (#5)	8 / 75	1	Coalition
1998	Carlos Garaikoetxea	108,635	8.57 (#5)	6 / 75	2	Coalition
2001	Juan José Ibarretxe	Within PNV–EA		7 / 75	1	Coalition
2005	Juan José Ibarretxe	Within PNV–EA		8 / 75	1	Coalition
2009	Unai Ziarreta	38,198	3.65 (#5)	1 / 75	7	Opposition
2012	Laura Mintegi	Within EH Bildu		4 / 75	3	Opposition
2016	Arnaldo Otegi (Note: Sortu Secretary-General Arnaldo Otegi was proclaimed as EH Bildu's leading candidate on 24 May 2016, having left the Logroño prison on 1 March after serving his full prison sentence imposed for attempting to reorganize the banned Batasuna party. On 24 August, the Gipuzkoa Provincial Electoral Commission disqualified Otegi due to a legal barring from holding any public office still in force until 2021. Subsequently, EH Bildu did not elect an alternative candidate to replace Otegi, though journalist Maddalen Iriarte—second in EH Bildu Gipuzkoa's list—went on to top the list as provided for in Article 65.2 of the Electoral Law of the Basque Country.)	Within EH Bildu		4 / 75	0	Opposition
2020	Maddalen Iriarte	Within EH Bildu		2 / 75	2	Opposition
2024	Pello Otxandiano	Within EH Bildu		4 / 75	2	Opposition

=== Parliament of Navarre ===
Parliament of Navarre
Election	Leading candidate	Votes	%	Seats	+/–	Government
1987	Iñaki Cabasés	19,840	7.00 (#5)	4 / 50	4	Opposition
1991	Fermín Ciaurriz	15,170	5.52 (#4)	3 / 50	1	Opposition
1995	Fermín Ciaurriz	13,568	4.57 (#6)	2 / 50	1	Coalition (1995–1996)
1995	Fermín Ciaurriz	13,568	4.57 (#6)	2 / 50	1	Opposition (1996–1999)
1999	Begoña Errazti	Within EA–PNV		2 / 50	0	Opposition
2003	Begoña Errazti	Within EA–PNV		3 / 50	1	Opposition
2007	Patxi Zabaleta	Within NaBai		4 / 50	1	Opposition
2011	Maiorga Ramírez	Within Bildu		3 / 50	1	Opposition
2015	Adolfo Araiz	Within EH Bildu		3 / 50	0	Coalition
2019	Bakartxo Ruiz	Within EH Bildu		3 / 50	0	Opposition
2023	Laura Aznal	Within EH Bildu		1 / 50	2	Opposition
