= Jesús Aizpún Tuero =

Spanish politician (1928–1999)

- Born: 17 June 1928; Pamplona, Spain
- Died: 29 December 1999 (aged 71)
- Occupation: Politician
- Political party: Navarrese People's Union

Jesús Aizpún Tuero (17 June 1928 – 29 December 1999) was a Spanish politician from the Navarrese People's Union. He served as member of the first five legislatures of the Congress of Deputies. He served also as member of the Navarrese Parliament.
