= Arnaldo Otegi =

Basque pro-independence politician (born 1958)

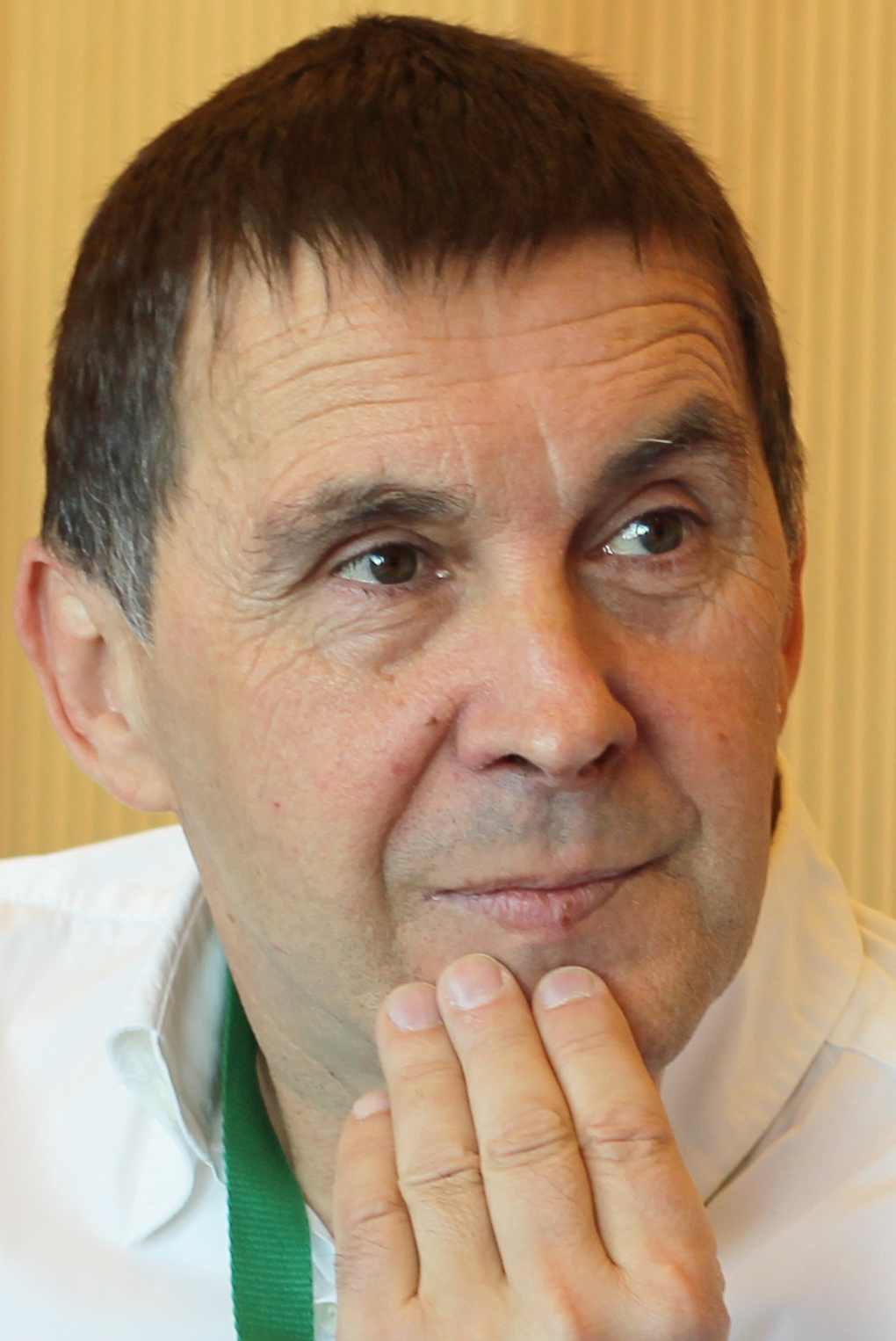
- Arnaldo Otegi in April 2016

Secretary General of EH Bildu
- Incumbent
- Assumed office 17 June 2017

Secretary General of Sortu
- In office 9 February 2011 – 17 June 2017
- Preceded by: Position created
- Succeeded by: Arkaitz Rodríguez

Member of the Basque Parliament
- In office 21 September 1995 – 16 June 2005
- Constituency: Gipuzkoa

Personal details
- Born: 6 July 1958 (age 68) Elgoibar, Spain
- Citizenship: Spain
- Party: Sortu (2011–present); EH Bildu (2012–present)
- Other political affiliations: Herri Batasuna (1994–1998); Euskal Herritarrok (1998–2001); Batasuna (2001–2003)
- Spouse: Julia Arregi Gorrotxategi
- Children: 2
- Occupation: Politician
- Website: www.arnaldotegi.eus

Arnaldo Otegi Mondragón (born 6 July 1958 in Elgoibar) is a politician from the Basque Country who has been the General Secretary of Basque nationalist party EH Bildu since 2017. He was a deputy of the Basque Parliament between 1995 and 2005 for both Herri Batasuna and Euskal Herritarrok. He was a convicted member of the ETA, an armed separatist organization, in his early years. He was one of the key negotiators during the unsuccessful peace talks in Loiola and Geneva, in 2006, as well as later peace talks that culminated in ETA's permanent ceasefire in 2011 and its full disarmament in 2017.

In the 1990s, Otegi started his political career and quickly gained prominence within the Basque separatist movement, becoming the leader of Herri Batasuna. During the period, he participated in the attempts at finding a political and negotiated solution for the Basque conflict that laid out the grounds for the Lizarra-Garazi Agreements and ETA's truce in 1998. He headed the party Batasuna, declared illegal in 2003 due to its alleged relationship with ETA, but continued talks with Jesus Egiguren from the Spanish PSOE party in order to reach a compromise leading to lasting peace.

In June 2007, Otegi was convicted of "praising terrorism", imprisoned, and then released from prison in August the following year. In October 2009 he was arrested for attempting to put Batasuna back together, and was given a ten-year sentence. In May 2012, his sentence was reduced to 6½ years by the Supreme Court of Spain as they considered him a member, but not a leader of ETA. Otegi was released from prison on 1 March 2016, with the European Court of Humans Rights ruling against Spain for the Spanish National Court's breach of the defendant's right to have an impartial trial, for which he had spent 6 years in prison. Otegi had already received a favorable ruling by that same European court 5 years earlier, when it was ruled that Spanish courts violated his right of freedom of speech in 2003, when he was given a one year prison sentence for slander against the Spanish king for saying said that the king "protects torturers".

Otegi was chosen as candidate for the post of Lehendakari by EH Bildu for the Basque parliamentary election of 2016 but the electoral committee invalidated his candidacy due to his penal disqualification.

In the April 2022 espionage scandal, it was known that agents of Spanish intelligence had been using the Pegasus software for spying on Arnaldo Otegi, as well as other Basque and Catalonian pro-independence politicians and activists.

== Biography ==
Otegi was born on 6 July 1958 in Elgoibar, Gipuzkoa, in what later would become the Autonomous Community of the Basque Country. He holds a university degree in philosophy and literature, is married and a father of two children. He was a militant of the abertzale left movement from a young age. In 1977 he fled to the French Basque Country, after Spanish authorities discovered his membership of ETA (pm). In 1987 the French police arrested him, before allowing him to be extradited to Spain. He was found guilty of taking part in the kidnapping of the Basque businessman Luis Abaitua and was sentenced to six years in prison. He spent three years imprisoned and was released in 1990.

On leaving prison, he decided to change how he would seek Basque independence and so entered politics. In the Basque parliamentary election in 1994 he was the seventh placed candidate on the party list of Herri Batasuna (HB) for Gipuzkoa. HB won six seats at the election with Otegi initially failing to be elected, but on 27 September 1995, he became a member of the Basque Parliament when he substituted a party colleague. In November 1997, the Spanish Supreme Court found 23 senior members of Herri Batasuna guilty of collaboration with ETA, imprisoning them for seven years. The ensuing power vacuum was filled by Joseba Permach and Arnaldo Otegi, chosen to become the new provisional leaders of Herri Batasuna. The sentence was overturned by the Spanish Constitutional Court in 1999, declaring the verdict against the HB members unconstitutional. Since then, Otegi has been the major spokesman for the movement, first in Herri Batasuna, and later in Euskal Herritarrok.

=== Lizarra-Garazi Agreements ===
Otegi played a key role in the formulation of what would be known as the Lizarra-Garazi Agreements, or "Declaration of Estella-Lizarra". This agreement was signed on 12 September 1998 in Estella-Lizarra by every political party linked to Basque nationalism in the Southern Basque Country, and Ezker Batua (EB), the Basque branch of the Spanish Izquierda Unida (United Left). These groups worked together under the understanding that "discussions would only take place while there was a total absence of all expressions of violence connected to the conflict".

This agreement proposed a common position on the defense of Basque self-determination. In the chapter Keys to the resolution it says:

"A resolution will not involve any specific impositions, will respect the plurality of Basque society, will place every project on equal terms, will deepen democracy in the sense of giving to the citizens of the Basque Country the last word on the shaping of their future, and that their decision should be respected by the countries involved. The Basque Country should have the final word and the decision."

ETA declared an "indefinite ceasefire" four days later, the second in the history of the organization. The conservative Spanish prime minister José María Aznar stated he had authorized direct contacts with ETA and he publicly called ETA a "Movimiento Vasco de Liberación" (Basque liberation movement). He also moved 135 Basque prisoners to prisons closer to the Basque Country. This claim made by the Spanish Government and some Spanish media was refuted by the Basque prisoners' family association Etxerat, which revealed that a similar or higher number of prisoners were being transferred farther away. The Spanish police continued arresting people and the negotiations never got very far.

Meanwhile, in the Basque parliamentary election in 1998, Arnaldo Otegi stood and won as a candidate for Euskal Herritarrok, in the constituency of Gipuzkoa. The Lizarra-Garazi agreements helped give Euskal Herritarrok their best electoral results in ten years, and they became the third-largest political party in Basque Country and the adjacent region of Navarre. This popularity in terms of votes was reversed when in 1999 ETA decided to end the ceasefire, and, in 2000, killed Pedro Antonio Blanco. ETA blamed the Basque Nationalist Party (PNV) for not implementing the Lizarra-Garazi agreements, and the PNV blamed ETA. The cessation of the ceasefire was condemned by every signatory to the Lizarra-Garazi agreements with the exception of Herri Batasuna. This refusal to condemn violence brought the agreements to an end.

=== Glorifying terrorism charges ===
Interview with Otegi (English subtitles)

In August 2000, a senior Basque court accused him of "glorifying terrorism", after he shouted "Gora Euskadi ta askatasuna!" ("Up Euskadi and freedom!") in Saint-Jean-de-Luz with reference to ETA, banned as a terrorist group by the Spanish and French governments. The Spanish Supreme Court closed the case, stating that crimes such as "glorifying terrorism" could not be pursued if committed abroad. This precedent was then called forth by the Audiencia Nacional concerning the Carmelo Soria case.

In May 2005, Otegi was put on trial for belonging to ETA, but was released after posting bail for €400,000. Shortly afterwards, a Spanish Supreme Court ruling confirmed the 15-month prison sentence against Otegi for "glorifying terrorism" in a case brought against him for a speech he had given in 2003 in commemoration of the murder by Spanish state-funded mercenaries of prominent ETA member "Argala" 25 years previously. He appealed the sentence, but a panel of judges unanimously rejected the appeal.

In November 2005, Otegi was sentenced to a year in prison, on charges of slander against King Juan Carlos during a 2003 news conference. Otegi had then stated that the King was the "chief of the Spanish army, that's to say, the person responsible for the torturers, who favour torture and impose his monarchic regime on our people through torture and violence". In 2011 the European Court of Human Rights declared that the sentence by the Spanish courts had violated Otegi's right to free speech.

On 27 April 2006, he was sentenced to 15 months in prison for the ongoing "glorifying terrorism" case. He started serving the sentence on 8 June 2007 and was released from prison in August 2008. Meanwhile, starting in October 2007, Otegi was prosecuted along with Pernando Barrena and other former members of Batasuna, PSE political leaders Patxi Lopez and Adolfo Ares, as well as the then incumbent Basque Autonomous Community president Juan Jose Ibarretxe, for holding talks to find a compromise leading to peace, as opposed to the approach adopted by the judge of the Justice High Court of the Basque Country, who considered the meetings illegal.

=== Gernika Peace and Reconciliation Award ===
While in prison, on 26 April 2013 Otegi received the Gernika Award of Peace and Reconciliation for his commitment in the quest of peace for the Basque Country, along with Jesus Egiguren, a public figure of the party PSE-EE, a Basque branch of the Spanish Socialists. The mayor of Gernika Jesus Maria Gorroño was indicted by the National Court of Spain following a report filed by the Spanish association Dignidad y Justicia for granting the award, which spurred the indignation of Egiguren, the other person awarded.

== 2009–2016 imprisonment ==
=== Case Bateragune and further indictments ===
On 16 October 2009, Otegi and several other Batasuna members were arrested and put on trial for their participation in the discussion that would pave the way for ETA's permanent ceasefire. Whilst awaiting sentence he started a hunger strike, on 27 January 2010, but stopped it soon after. In March 2010 the Spanish court sentenced Otegi to two years in prison for "glorifying terrorism" in a speech he gave in 2005 in which he compared an imprisoned ETA member to Nelson Mandela. He was also barred from holding public office for sixteen years.

In September 2010, Otegi again faced trial for glorifying terrorism, this time at a November 2004 rally held in the Anoeta Velodrome in San Sebastián. He was found not guilty by the Spanish National Court, which ruled that Otegi did not praise ETA, but was defending "peaceful coexistence and the need for a process of dialogue and negotiation in order to resolve the conflict in a non-violent and democratic way".

In September 2011, Otegi was found guilty of the initial charge, trying to rebuild Batasuna, and sentenced to ten years imprisonment. On 9 May 2012, his sentence was reduced to 6½ years by the Supreme Court of Spain as they found enough evidence to prove his membership, but not his leadership of the organization. He was elected Secretary General of abertzale Basque separatist party Sortu in February 2013.

=== Campaign for release ===
On 24 March 2015, a campaign for Arnaldo Otegi's release was launched in the European Parliament by Basque musician Fermin Muguruza who read out the "International Declaration to Free Otegi and to bring Basque Political Prisoners home". The declaration was endorsed by 24 international personalities, including Desmond Tutu, Adolfo Pérez Esquivel and José Mujica. Otegi was released from prison on 1 March 2016, after six years in prison.

=== Ruling of the European Court of Human Rights ===
In November 2018, the European Court of Human Rights condemned Spain for breaching the defendants right to an impartial trial he did not have. This was the second time that the European Court of Human Rights ruled in favour of Arnaldo Otegi. As Otegi declared:

"They lied, they fabricated a fake allegation, they incarcerated us, we served the term... We got incarcerated for designing a peaceful strategy. Now their big lie gets exposed. Our smile is broader, and Spain gets back the portrait of what it is, an antidemocratic state."

The president of the Basque Autonomous Community Iñigo Urkullu declared that it was "about time to stop tampering with the judiciary in order to condition politics". The incumbent president of Catalonia Quim Torra considered that "Spanish Justice has been taken to task once again". The president of Navarre Uxue Barkos also declared that "Spanish Justice gets a setback yet again, for which certain circles should rethink their ways". The Spanish Minister of Justice Fernando Grande-Marlaska, whose job as a National Court judge was condemned by the European Court of Human Rights for not investigating torture, stated that the ruling did not question Spanish Justice, and that he respected it. Despite the sentence, Pablo Casado, leader of the main opposition party in Spain PP, stated all the same that Arnaldo Otegi "should apologize for what he did".

Following the ruling of the European Court of Human Rights, in December 2020, the Supreme Court of Spain considered the ruling to be equivalent to absence of trial. It subsequently ordered a repetition of the trial, denying also Otegi and rest of defendants their eligibility for damages, since they had not been cleared. In January 2024, a final sentence by the Spanish Constitutional Court admitted Otegi's appeal and overturned the decision issued by the Supreme Court to repeat the process based on the principle non bis in idem, the right not to be subject to trial twice for the same cause.

== Espionage scandal ==
On 19 April 2022, the Citizen Lab of the University of Toronto and The New Yorker disclosed a large-scale scheme of political espionage to Catalan and Basque pro-independence leaders by the Spanish Government, including Otegi and fellow EH Bildu member and Spanish parliamentary Jon Iñarritu, eavesdropped through Israeli spyware Pegasus. A spokesperson of the interior ministry of Spain denied any involvement; other Spanish authorities dismissed the possibility of revealing CNI's alleged participation on the grounds that the activity of the state's spy agency is secret. Otegi ultimately put down the alleged espionage to the deep state inherited from Francoism and its impunity.

== See also ==
- Egunkaria
- Juan María Atutxa
- Trial of Catalonia independence leaders
