= PNV–EA =

- Founded: 13 March 1999
- Dissolved: 31 August 2006
- Merger of: PNV; EA
- Ideology: Basque nationalism
- Political position: Big tent

The Basque Nationalist Party–Basque Solidarity alliance (English for Partido Nacionalista Vasco–Eusko Alkartasuna) was the electoral coalition formed by the Basque Nationalist Party (PNV) and Eusko Alkartasuna (EA) to contest local and regional elections in the Basque Country (as PNV–EA) and Navarre (as EA–PNV) between 1999 and 2006. It also contested the 1999 European Parliament election.

PNV and EA, the later of which had split from the former in 1986, reached an electoral coalition agreement on 13 March 1999, in order to counter the electoral ascendance of both the People's Party of the Basque Country and Euskal Herritarrok. The alliance was disbanded after EA's leadership voted on 31 August 2006 not to preserve the coalition ahead of the 2007 local elections.

== Composition ==
Party
Basque Nationalist Party (EAJ/PNV)
Basque Solidarity (EA)

== Electoral performance ==
=== Regional parliaments ===
==== Basque Parliament ====
Basque Parliament
Election	Leading candidate	Votes	%	#	Seats	+/–	Status in legislature
2001	Juan José Ibarretxe	604,222	42.38%	1st	33 / 75	6	Coalition (PNV–EA)
2001	Juan José Ibarretxe	604,222	42.38%	1st	33 / 75	6	Coalition (PNV–EA–EB; from September 2001)
2005	Juan José Ibarretxe	468,117	38.38%	1st	29 / 75	4	Coalition (PNV–EA–EB)

==== Parliament of Navarre ====
Parliament of Navarre
Election	Leading candidate	Votes	%	#	Seats	+/–	Status in legislature
1999	Begoña Errazti	16,512	5.44%	6th	3 / 50	1	Opposition
2003	Begoña Errazti	22,824	7.43%	6th	4 / 50	1	Opposition

=== European Parliament ===
European Parliament
Election	Total					Basque Country			Navarre		
Election	Votes	%	#	Seats	+/–	Votes	%	#	Votes	%	#
1999	Within CN–EP			1 / 64	0	392,800	33.93%	1st	17,030	5.70%	4th
