= Navarrese People's Union =

Navarrese People's Union Unión del Pueblo Navarro
- President: Cristina Ibarrola
- Founded: 1979
- Split from: Union of the Democratic Centre
- Headquarters: Pamplona
- Youth wing: Navarrese Youth
- Membership (2016): 3,850
- Ideology: Conservatism; Christian democracy; Navarrese regionalism; Spanish unionism
- Political position: Centre-right to right-wing
- National affiliation: People's Coalition (1982–1987); People's Party (1991–2008)
- Regional affiliation: Navarra Suma (2019–2022)
- Colours: Blue, red, white
- Congress of Deputies Navarrese seats: 1 / 5
- Senate Navarrese seats: 1 / 5
- European Parliament (Spanish seats): 0 / 61
- Parliament of Navarre: 15 / 50
- Town councillors: 281 / 1,889

Website
- upn.org

The Navarrese People's Union (Spanish: Unión del Pueblo Navarro; Basque: Nafar Herriaren Batasuna), abbreviated to UPN, is a regional conservative political party in Navarre, Spain. Until 2008, it was a fraternal party of the People's Party (PP), acting as the latter's Navarrese branch.

UPN is a strong opponent of Basque nationalism, and supports a Spanish regional identity for Navarre with a marginal Basque component and separate from the Basque Country. The party's regionalist tradition dates back to the nineteenth century, in which the Spanish nation is seen to be based on 'regional liberties'.

During the 1991–2008 period, UPN acted as the Navarrese branch of the PP, which, in return, did not run at Navarrese elections as a part of their agreement. Since 1991, UPN has been the largest party in elections for the regional Parliament of Navarre and was the ruling party of the Autonomous Community from 1996 to 2015.

== History ==
Logo of the party until 2017

The UPN was a Navarrese splinter group of the Union of the Democratic Centre. Its president, Miguel Sanz, had been the head of the Navarrese government from 1996 to 2015.

Juan Cruz Alli was elected president of the Navarrese government for UPN, but later disagreed with the orientation the party was taking and founded another party Democrats' Convergence of Navarre.

=== Pacts with the PP ===
As part of an agreement held over the 1991–2008 period, the PP did not run in any elections in the Navarra Congress Electoral District and People's Party of Navarre (founded in 1989) was dissolved, while UPN were on the same national ticket as the PP at the Spanish national elections. The national Deputies and Senators elected as part of UPN's ticket were part of the PP Parliamentary Group. Also, UPN members were eligible –and indeed chosen– for national leadership positions in the PP.

The pact was terminated in October 2008 as a result of UPN refusal to vote alongside the PP in the Spanish Congress of Deputies to reject the government budget presented by José Luis Rodríguez Zapatero's cabinet. One of the two MPs elected under the UPN-PP ticket refused to follow UPN's instructions and a number of UPN elected representatives defected to join the PP. The new situation led to the PP setting up its own office in Navarre.

The two parties ran separate lists in the 2011 regional elections in Navarre with the UPN receiving 34.5% against the 7.3% that the PP received. On 8 September 2011, the two parties reached an agreement to renew their alliance for the 2011 Spanish general election. Under the agreement, the UPN would take the first and third places on the list for Congress while the PP would have the second. For the Senate, the UPN would have the top two places on the list, with the PP taking the third place. A major factor in the new agreement was the two parties' desire to prevent Bildu from winning enough seats to form a parliamentary group.

== Electoral performance ==
=== Parliament of Navarre ===
Parliament of Navarre
Election	Leading candidate	Votes	%	Seats	+/–	Government
1979	Jesús Aizpún	40,764	15.99 (#3)	13 / 70	—	Opposition
1983	Balbino Bados	62,072	23.34 (#2)	13 / 50	0	Opposition
1987	Juan Cruz Alli	69,419	24.50 (#2)	14 / 50	1	Opposition
1991	Juan Cruz Alli	96,005	34.95 (#1)	20 / 50	6	Minority
1995	Miguel Sanz	93,163	31.35 (#1)	17 / 50	3	Opposition (1995–1996)
1995	Miguel Sanz	93,163	31.35 (#1)	17 / 50	3	Minority (1996–1999)
1999	Miguel Sanz	125,497	41.37 (#1)	22 / 50	5	Minority
2003	Miguel Sanz	127,460	41.48 (#1)	23 / 50	1	Coalition
2007	Miguel Sanz	139,122	42.19 (#1)	22 / 50	1	Coalition (2007–2009)
2007	Miguel Sanz	139,122	42.19 (#1)	22 / 50	1	Minority (2009–2011)
2011	Yolanda Barcina	111,474	34.48 (#1)	19 / 50	3	Coalition (2011–2012)
2011	Yolanda Barcina	111,474	34.48 (#1)	19 / 50	3	Minority (2012–2015)
2015	Javier Esparza	92,705	27.44 (#1)	15 / 50	4	Opposition
2019	Javier Esparza	Within NA+		15 / 50	0	Opposition
2023	Javier Esparza	92,392	28.00 (#1)	15 / 50	0	Opposition

=== Cortes Generales ===
Cortes Generales
Election	Navarre						
Election	Congress					Senate	
Election	Vote	%	Score	Seats	+/–	Seats	+/–
1979	28,248	11.17%	3rd	1 / 5	—	0 / 4	—
1982 (Note: Electoral alliance with the People's Alliance and People's Democratic Party.)	76,255	25.59%	2nd	2 / 5	1	1 / 4	1
1986 (Note: Electoral alliance with the People's Coalition.)	80,922	29.63%	2nd	2 / 5	0	1 / 4	0
1989 (Note: Electoral alliance with the People's Party.)	92,216	33.18%	1st	3 / 5	1	3 / 4	2
1993	112,228	36.13%	1st	3 / 5	0	3 / 4	0
1996	120,335	37.12%	1st	2 / 5	1	3 / 4	0
2000	150,995	49.89%	1st	3 / 5	1	3 / 4	0
2004	127,653	37.60%	1st	2 / 5	1	3 / 4	0
2008	133,059	39.22%	1st	2 / 5	0	3 / 4	0
2011 (Note: Electoral alliance with the People's Party, which won 1 deputy and 1 senator.)	126,516	38.21%	1st	1 / 5	1	2 / 4	1
2015 (Note: Electoral alliance with the People's Party, which won 2 senators.)	102,244	28.94%	1st	2 / 5	1	1 / 4	1
2016	106,976	31.90%	1st	2 / 5	0	1 / 4	0
2019 (Apr)	Within NA+			2 / 5	0	1 / 4	0
2019 (Nov)	Within NA+			2 / 5	0	1 / 4	0
2023	51,764	15.27%	4th	1 / 5	1	1 / 4	0
