= Miguel Sanz =

Spanish politician (born 1952)

Miguel Sanz Sesma
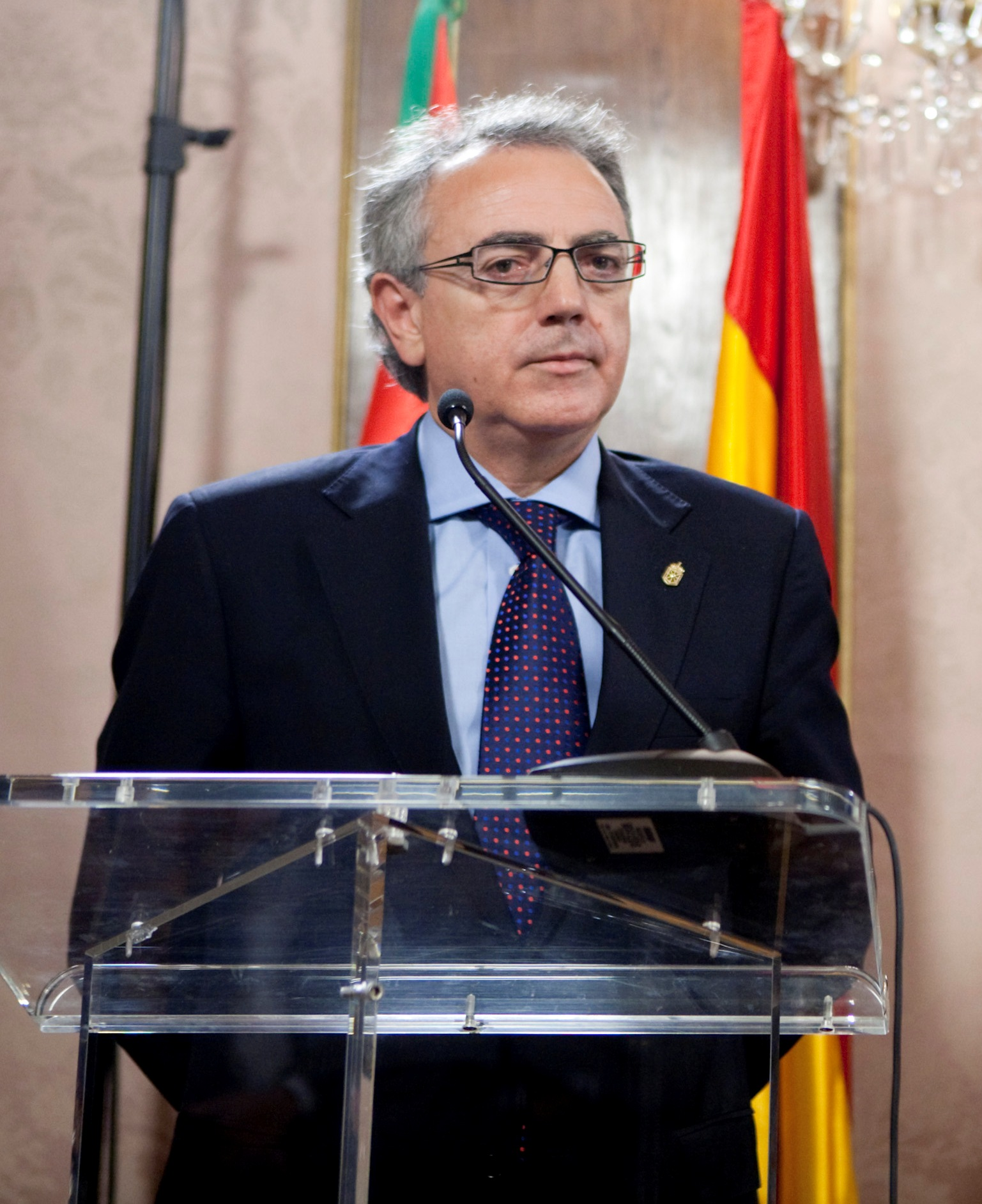

7th President of the Government of Navarre
- In office 18 September 1996 – 1 June 2011
- Monarch: Juan Carlos I
- Preceded by: Javier Otano
- Succeeded by: Yolanda Barcina

Personal details
- Born: Miguel Sanz Sesma; 16 September 1952 (age 73) Corella, Navarre, Spanish State
- Party: Navarrese People's Union

Miguel Sanz Sesma (born 16 September 1952) is a conservative Spanish politician of the Navarrese People's Union (UPN) and the president of the autonomous community of Navarre from 1996 to 2011.

== Biography ==
Originally a lecturer of primary education, Sanz later studied business administration at the University of Navarre. He served as the mayor of his hometown Corella from 1983 to 1987. He was also elected to the Parliament of Navarre in 1983 and served incessantly since that date. He was elected the vice-president of UPN in 1989 and became the vice-president of Navarre under UPN government of Juan Cruz Alli (1991–1995). He was elected the president of Navarre in 1996 and the chairman of UPN in 1997 until he was replaced by Yolanda Barcina, the mayor of Pamplona in 2009.

After eleven years in office, presidency of Sanz came under jeopardy after left wing and Basque nationalist parties won a majority in the Navarrese parliament in 2007. However, the Spanish Socialist Workers' Party reached an agreement with UPN and Sanz was re-elected as president (in coalition with the Democrats' Convergence of Navarre), whereas socialist Elena Torres Miranda became the president of the parliament. In an interview with El País, he declared that he does not have the intention to run at the Navarrese elections in 2011.

Sanz has been known as a fierce opponent of Basque nationalism as well as fiscal centrism, the latter stance having led to termination of UPN's fraternal party relationship with the People's Party and the reappearance of the People's Party of Navarre in 2008.
