= Juan Cruz Alli =

Spanish politician

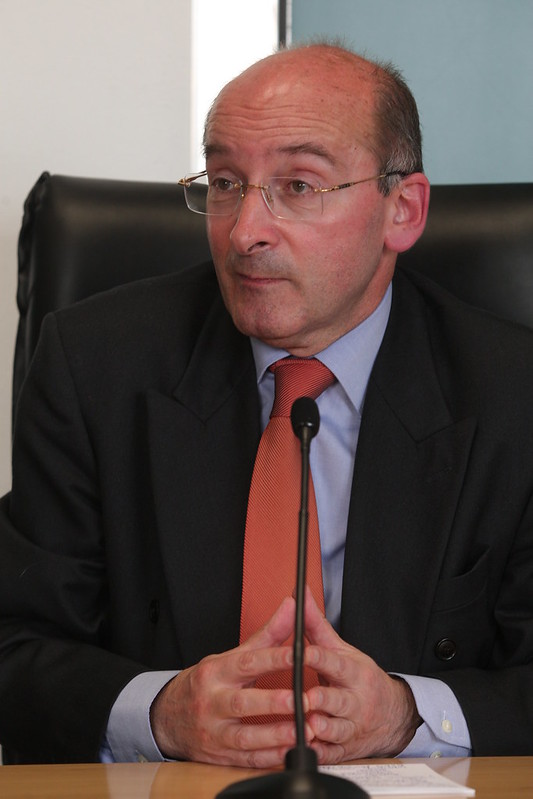

5th President of the Government of Navarre
- In office 3 September 1991 – 3 July 1995; Acting: 19 June 1996 – 18 September 1996
- Preceded by: Gabriel Urralburu
- Succeeded by: Javier Otano

Vice President of the Government of Navarre
- In office 3 July 1995 – 18 September 1996
- President: Javier Otano
- Preceded by: Miguel Sanz
- Succeeded by: Rafael Gurrea Induráin

Personal details
- Born: Juan Cruz Alli Aranguren; 21 September 1942 (age 83) Pamplona, Navarre, Spain
- Party: UPN; CDN

Juan Cruz Alli Aranguren (born 21 September 1942) is a Spanish politician and former President of Navarre between 1991 and 1995 and again for a few months in 1996.
