= Convergence of Democrats of Navarre =

Convergence of Democrats of Navarre Convergencia de Demócratas de Navarra
- Leader: José Andrés Burguete Torres
- Founded: 1995
- Dissolved: 2011
- Headquarters: Pamplona
- Ideology: Christian democracy Navarrese regionalism Foralism
- Political position: Centre-right
- Colours

Website
- www.cdn.es

The Convergence of Democrats of Navarre (Spanish: Convergencia de Demócratas de Navarra, CDN), also referred to as Navarrese Democratic Convergence, was a regionalist political party of the Spanish autonomous community of Navarre that split from Navarrese People's Union (UPN) in the 1990s, after this party became part of the conservative pan-Spanish People's Party. The break-away faction gathered around the figure of Juan Cruz Alli, former President of Navarre.

Between 2003 and 2009, CDN was part of the coalition government of Navarre, together with UPN. In the regional elections held in May 2011, it lost the two seats kept in the Parliament of Navarre, and the party broke up.

== Election results ==
=== Parliament of Navarre ===
Parliament of Navarre
Election	Leader	# of votes	%	Seats won	±	Size	Government
1995	Juan Cruz Alli	55,153	18.6%	10 / 50	▲10	3rd	Coalition (PSN-CDN-EA)
1999	Juan Cruz Alli	20,821	6.9%	3 / 50	▼7	5th	Opposition
2003	Juan Cruz Alli	23,516	7.7%	4 / 50	▲1	5th	Coalition (UPN-CDN)
2007	Juan Cruz Alli	14,418	4.4%	2 / 50	▼2	4th	Coalition (UPN-CDN)
2011	José Andrés Burguete	4,654	1.4%	0 / 50	▼2	7th	No Seats
