= Begoña Errazti =

Spanish politician (born 1957)

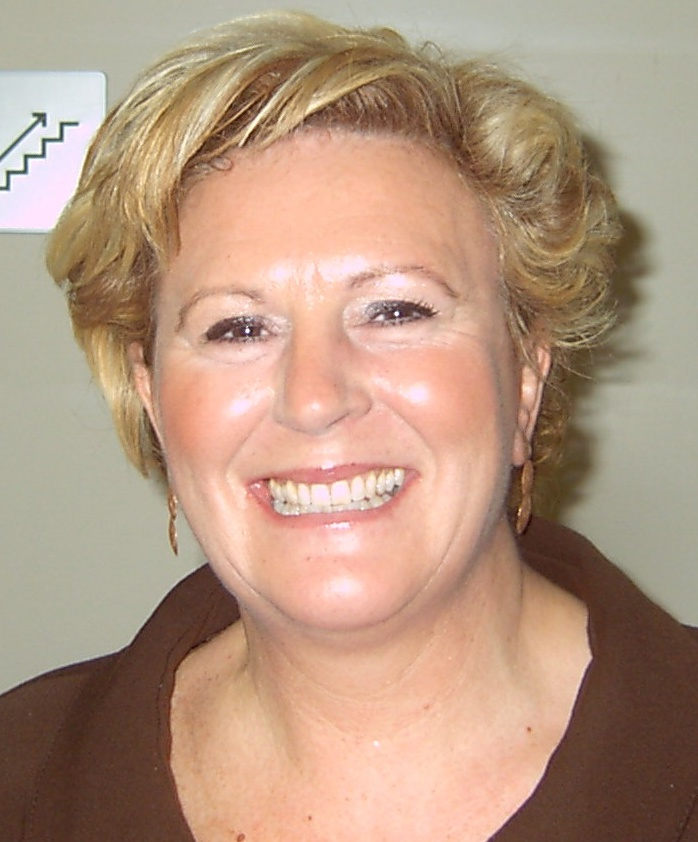
- Begoña Errazti (2007)
- Born: 22 August 1957 (age 67); Barakaldo, Basque Country, Spain
- Occupation(s): University teacher Politician

Begoña Errazti (born 22 August 1957) is a Spanish politician. She is a leading member of the Basque Solidarity (Eusko Alkartasuna) party, which is associated with Basque nationalism and Social democratic policies. In 2007 she resigned as the party's president.

== Life ==
=== Early years ===
Begoña Errazti has a degree in Geography and Contemporary History. She also holds a master's degree in Business Management.

She has worked as a director with the Taller Río Arga schools workshop, a European project for training young people on river and riverbank management, along with various related specialities. She is a university level of history and Basque studies, and Professor of Basque studies at the University of Deusto. She was also a manager of the Federation of Ikastolas (Basque schools) for Navarre.

=== Political life ===
For her supporters, Errazti is a defender of Basque autonomy, which she combines with progressive approach to mainstream issues.

During the legislative session 1995-1999 and again from 1999 till 2003 she headed up the Basque Solidarity Party (Eusko Alkartasuna / EA) group in the Parliament of Navarre. Following the 2003 provincial elections, despite her name having been at the top of the party list, this position was passed to the present more youthful leadership incumbent in the Navarre assembly, Maiorga Ramírez.

She was an EA national executive member between 1995 and 2007, becoming party president in 1999.

After the EA moved closer to the nationalist left, however, and its inclusion in the EH Bildu Basque coalition, she left the EA and became aligned with the Basque Nationalist Party, attending public events in support of the successful 2012 regional presidential candidate, Iñigo Urkullu.
