= Euskal Herritarrok =

Basque Citizens Euskal Herritarrok
- Spokesperson: Arnaldo Otegi
- Founded: September 1998
- Banned: 23 May 2003 (by the Supreme Court of Spain)
- Merger of: Herri Batasuna; Batzarre (until 2000); Zutik (until 2000)
- Merged into: Batasuna; A minority faction formed the Aralar Party
- Headquarters: c/ Juan de Bilbao, nº 17, San Sebastián
- Ideology: Basque nationalism Socialism; Ezker abertzalea Left-wing nationalism Basque independence Feminism; Ecologism; Revolutionary socialism
- Political position: Left-wing
- Basque Parliament (1998-2001): 14 / 75
- Parliament of Navarre (1999-2003): 8 / 55
- European Parliament (1999-2004): 1 / 64
- Town councillors (1999-2003): 890 / 4,635

Euskal Herritarrok (English: Basque Citizens, EH) was a Basque independentist and socialist political party in the Basque Country. EH was banned in 2003 by the Supreme Court of Spain on the grounds that it sympathized with ETA.

== History ==
In February 2000, Batzarre and Zutik left EH after the rupture of the ETA 1998-2000 truce, due to the absence of any condemnation of that fact by EH. In June 2000 a sector of Herri Batasuna also decided to split and form the Aralar Party, that openly and fully rejected ETA and its rupture of the truce.

== Election results ==
=== Regional parliaments ===
==== Basque Parliament ====
Basque Parliament
Election	Leading candidate	Votes	%	Seats	+/–
1998	Arnaldo Otegi	224,001	17.66 (#3)	14 / 75	3
2001	Arnaldo Otegi	143,139	10.04 (#4)	7 / 75	7

==== Parliament of Navarre ====
Parliament of Navarre
Election	Leading candidate	Votes	%	Seats	+/–
1998	Pernando Barrena	47,271	15.58 (#3)	8 / 50	3

=== European Parliament ===
European Parliament
Election	Leading candidate	Votes	%	Seats	+/–
1998	Koldo Gorostiaga	306,923	1.45 (#8)	1 / 64	1

=== Local councils ===
Local councils
Election	Spain			+/–	Basque Country			Navarre		
Election	Votes	%	Seats	+/–	Votes	%	Seats	Votes	%	Seats
1999	272,446	1.28 (#8)	890 / 65,201	890	228,169	19.63 (#2)	679 / 2,540	44,299	14.94 (#3)	211 / 1,677

=== Foral elections ===
General Assemblies
Election	Votes	%	Seats	+/–
1999	228,528	19.73 (#2)	29 / 153	29
