= 2015 Navarrese regional election =

Election in the Spanish region of Navarre

- 24 May 2015

All 50 seats in the Parliament of Navarre 26 seats needed for a majority
- Opinion polls
- Registered: 501,267 ▲3.3%
- Turnout: 342,173 (68.3%) ▲0.9 pp
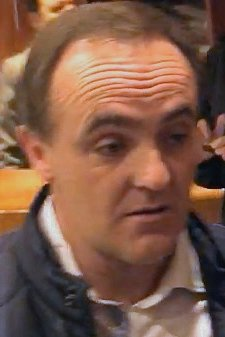

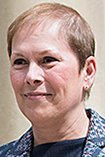

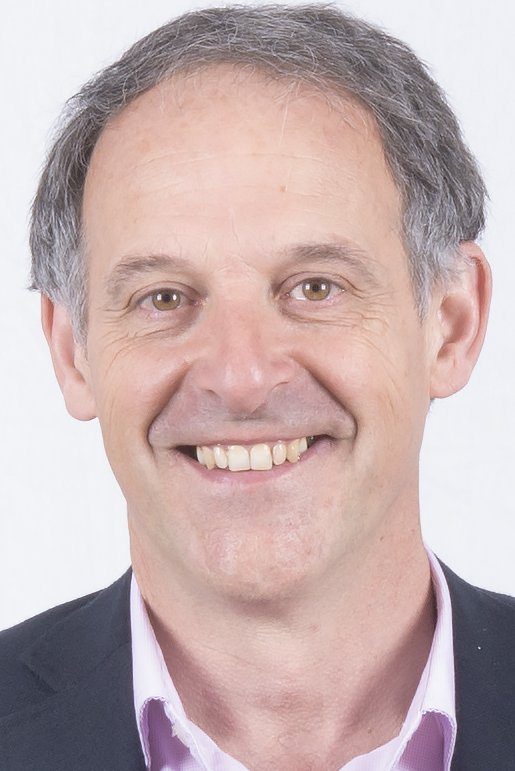

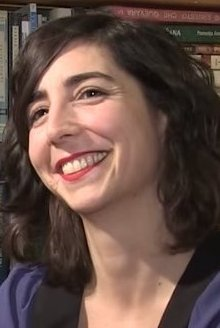

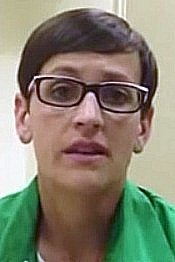

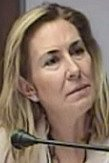
	First party	Second party	Third party
Leader	Javier Esparza	Uxue Barkos	Adolfo Araiz
Party	UPN	GBai	EH Bildu
Leader since	30 November 2014	3 October 2014	11 October 2014
Last election	19 seats, 34.5%	8 seats, 15.4% (Note: Results for NaBai 2011 in the 2011 election.)	7 seats, 13.3%
Seats won	15	9	8
Seat change	▼4	▲1	▲1
Popular vote	92,705	53,497	48,166
Percentage	27.4%	15.8%	14.2%
Swing	▼7.1 pp	▲0.4 pp	▲0.9 pp
	Fourth party	Fifth party	Sixth party
Leader	Laura Pérez	María Chivite	Ana Beltrán
Party	Podemos/Ahal Dugu	PSN–PSOE	PP
Leader since	14 February 2015	19 October 2014	6 March 2015
Last election	Did not contest	9 seats, 15.9%	4 seats, 7.3%
Seats won	7	7	2
Seat change	▲7	▼2	▼2
Popular vote	46,207	45,164	13,289
Percentage	13.7%	13.4%	3.9%
Swing	New party	▼2.5 pp	▼3.4 pp
President before election
Yolanda Barcina
UPN
President after election
Uxue Barkos
Zabaltzen (GBai)

A regional election was held in Navarre on 24 May 2015 to elect the 9th Parliament of the chartered community. All 50 seats in the Parliament were up for election. It was held concurrently with regional elections in twelve other autonomous communities and local elections all across Spain.

Regional president Yolanda Barcina, who had only came to power in 2011 after the establishment of a coalition government between the Navarrese People's Union (UPN) and the Socialist Party of Navarre (PSN–PSOE)—which proved to be short-lived, as Barcina herself expelled the PSN from the cabinet in 2012 over disagreements with then-PSN leader Roberto Jiménez—announced on 10 November 2014 that she would not seek re-election for a second term in office. This came after a term that proved to become the most unstable since the Spanish transition to democracy, with Barcina's minority government being unable to pass any budget following 2012, with one failed motion of no confidence in 2013 and the scare of a new one in 2014 over a number of alleged corruption scandals besieging UPN.

After a spell of 19 years in power since 1996, the election saw UPN's support plummet to a low in popular support unseen since 1987, whereas the PSN scored its worst result in history after falling to fifth place. Both parties, together with the support obtained by the then-ruling party in Spain, the People's Party (PP), commanded just 24 seats, two short of a majority, allowing an alliance of Geroa Bai (GBai), EH Bildu and Izquierda-Ezkerra (I–E) with external support from Podemos to access the regional government and have GBai's Uxue Barkos elected as new president.

== Background ==
The 2011 regional election had resulted in a coalition agreement between Navarrese People's Union (UPN) and the Socialist Party of Navarre (PSN), with UPN leader Yolanda Barcina being elected as President. However, tensions remained frequent between both coalition partners, and in June 2012, PSN-PSOE leader and then-Vice President of Navarre Roberto Jiménez' questioning of a UPN's decision to pass an additional budget cut of 132 billion euros resulted in his expulsion from Barcina's cabinet. The PSOE withdrew from the regional government, leaving UPN in minority. As a consequence, with the left-wing opposition commanding a majority in Parliament, political instability marked the remainder of the legislature, with the government being unable to pass its bills into law or to approve further budgets.

The eruption of the Caja Navarra scandal in early 2013, involving President Barcina and other UPN high-ranking members, resulted in an ill-fated attempt by Bildu and Aralar–Nafarroa Bai to bring forward a censure motion against Yolanda Barcina, which had no realistic prospect of succeeding because of PSN's abstention. Additionally, dissent within Barcina's party materialized with party Vice President Alberto Catalán forcing a leadership election in March 2013 which Barcina was only narrowly able to win. In February 2014, regional minister of Finance, Lourdes Goicoechea, was accused of influence peddling within the regional Treasury, prompting Roberto Jiménez to threaten Barcina with a censure motion if she did not voluntarily call for a snap regional election. The PSOE national leadership, however, explicitly forbade its regional branch from reaching any kind of agreement that needed Bildu's support, and Jiménez backed down on his threat as a consequence.

The PSN-PSOE was severely mauled in the same year European Parliament election, winning just 14.5% compared to the 31.5% it had won in 2009, and losing over half of its 2009 votes (31,629 compared to 63,848 in 2009). Roberto Jiménez resigned as PSN leader, being succeeded by María Chivite. The abertzale left represented under EH Bildu's flag, on the other hand, became the second political force of the community for the first time ever, with 20.2% of the vote.

Podemos' emergence in opinion polls marked the end of the legislature into 2015. Yolanda Barcina, who had initially expressed her willingness to stand for re-election as late as August 2014, announced on 10 November 2014 that she would not stand for a second term. A primary election was held on 29 November, in which incumbent Local Administration minister Javier Esparza defeated Alberto Catalán and became UPN candidate for the 2015 regional election.

== Overview ==
Under the 1982 Reintegration and Improvement of the Chartered Regime, the Parliament of Navarre was the unicameral legislature of the homonymous chartered community, having legislative power in devolved matters, as well as the ability to grant or withdraw confidence from a regional president. The electoral and procedural rules were supplemented by national law provisions.

=== Date ===
The term of the Parliament of Navarre expired four years after the date of its previous election, unless it was dissolved earlier. If no snap election was called before the last year of the legislative term, the election decree was required to be issued no later than 54 days before the scheduled election date and published on the following day in the Official Gazette of Navarre (BON), with election day taking place on the fourth Sunday of May four years after the previous election. The previous election was held on 22 May 2011, setting the latest possible date for election day on the fourth Sunday of May four years later, which was 24 May 2015.

The regional president had the prerogative to dissolve the Parliament of Navarre at any given time and call a snap election, provided that no motion of no confidence was in process, no nationwide election was due and some time requirements are met: namely, that dissolution did not occur either during the first legislative session or during the last year of parliament before its planned expiration, nor before one year after a previous one under this procedure. In the event of an investiture process failing to elect a regional president within a three-month period from election day, the Parliament was to be automatically dissolved and a fresh election called.

The election to the Parliament of Navarre was officially called on 31 March 2015 with the publication of the corresponding decree in the BON, setting election day for 24 May and scheduling for the chamber to reconvene on 17 June.

=== Electoral system ===
Voting for the Parliament was based on universal suffrage, comprising all Spanish nationals over 18 years of age, registered in Navarre and with full political rights, provided that they had not been deprived of the right to vote by a final sentence, nor were legally incapacitated. Additionally, non-resident citizens were required to apply for voting, a system known as "begged" voting (Spanish: Voto rogado).

The Parliament of Navarre had a minimum of 40 and a maximum of 60 seats, with electoral provisions fixing its size at 50. All were elected in a single multi-member constituency—corresponding to the chartered community's territory—using the D'Hondt method and closed-list proportional voting, with a three percent-threshold of valid votes (including blank ballots) regionally.

The law did not provide for by-elections to fill vacant seats; instead, any vacancies arising after the proclamation of candidates and during the legislative term were filled by the next candidates on the party lists or, when required, by designated substitutes.

=== Outgoing parliament ===
The table below shows the composition of the parliamentary groups in the chamber at the time of the election call.

Parliamentary composition in March 2015
Groups	Parties	Legislators	
Groups	Parties	Seats	Total
Navarrese People's Union Parliamentary Group	UPN	19	19
Socialists of Navarre Parliamentary Group	PSN–PSOE	9	9
Bildu–Navarre Parliamentary Group	Bildu	7	7
Aralar–Navarre Yes Parliamentary Group	Aralar	6	6
People's Parliamentary Group of Navarre	PP	4	4
Left Parliamentary Group	IU	2	3
Left Parliamentary Group	Batzarre	1	3
Mixed Group	EAJ/PNV	1	2
Mixed Group	Zabaltzen	1	2

== Parties and candidates ==
The electoral law allowed for parties and federations registered in the interior ministry, alliances and groupings of electors to present lists of candidates. Parties and federations intending to form a coalition ahead of an election were required to inform the relevant electoral commission within 10 days of the election call, whereas groupings of electors needed to secure the signature of at least one percent of the electorate in Navarre, disallowing electors from signing for more than one list. Additionally, a balanced composition of men and women was required in the electoral lists, so that candidates of either sex made up at least 40 percent of the total composition.

Below is a list of the main parties and alliances which contested the election:

Candidacy	Parties and alliances	Leading candidate	Ideology	Previous result		Gov.	Ref.
Candidacy	Parties and alliances	Leading candidate	Ideology	Vote %	Seats	Gov.	Ref.
UPN	List: Navarrese People's Union (UPN)	Javier Esparza	Conservatism; Christian democracy Regionalism	34.5%	19	Yes	
PSN–PSOE	List: Socialist Party of Navarre (PSN–PSOE)	María Chivite	Social democracy	15.9%	9	No	
GBai	List: Expanding (ZBN); Basque Nationalist Party (EAJ/PNV); Villava Group (AT)	Uxue Barkos	Basque nationalism Social democracy	15.4%	8	No	
EH Bildu	List: Create (Sortu); Basque Solidarity (EA); Aralar (Aralar); Alternative (Alternatiba)	Adolfo Araiz	Basque independence Abertzale left Socialism	13.3%	7	No	
PP	List: People's Party (PP)	Ana Beltrán	Conservatism; Christian democracy	7.3%	4	No	
I–E (n)	List: United Left of Navarre (IUN/NEB) – Communist Party of the Basque Country (PCE/EPK) – The Dawn Marxist Organization (La Aurora (OM)) – Republican Left (IR) – Open Left (IzAb); Assembly (Batzarre)	José Miguel Nuin	Socialism; Communism	5.7%	3	No	
Podemos/ Ahal Dugu	List: We Can (Podemos)	Laura Pérez	Left-wing populism Direct democracy Democratic socialism	Did not contest		No	
C's	List: Citizens–Party of the Citizenry (C's)	Diego Paños	Liberalism	Did not contest		No	

== Opinion polls ==
The tables below list opinion polling results in reverse chronological order, showing the most recent first and using the dates when the survey fieldwork was done, as opposed to the date of publication. Where the fieldwork dates are unknown, the date of publication is given instead. The highest percentage figure in each polling survey is displayed with its background shaded in the leading party's colour. If a tie ensues, this is applied to the figures with the highest percentages. The "Lead" column on the right shows the percentage-point difference between the parties with the highest percentages in a poll.

=== Voting intention estimates ===
The table below lists weighted voting intention estimates. Refusals are generally excluded from the party vote percentages, while question wording and the treatment of "don't know" responses and those not intending to vote may vary between polling organisations. When available, seat projections determined by the polling organisations are displayed below (or in place of) the percentages in a smaller font; 26 seats were required for an absolute majority in the Parliament of Navarre.

Color key:

Poll conducted after legal ban on opinion polls

Polling firm/Commissioner	Fieldwork date	Sample size	Turnout	UPN	PSN–PSOE	GBai	EH Bildu	PP	I–E (n)	UPyD	Podemos	C's	Lead
2015 regional election	24 May 2015	—N/a	68.3	27.4; 15	13.4; 7	15.8; 9	14.3; 8	3.9; 2	3.7; 2	0.5; 0	13.7; 7	3.0; 0	11.6
GAD3/Antena 3	11–22 May 2015	?	?	? 15/16	? 6/7	? 8/9	? 7/8	? 3/4	? 0/1	–	? 6/7	? 1/2	?
GAD3/ABC	17 May 2015	?	?	? 14/15	? 6	? 8/9	? 7	? 3	? 1	–	? 7/8	? 3	?
NC Report/La Razón	17 May 2015	400	?	22.3; 12/13	11.9; 6/7	11.0; 6	15.2; 8/9	8.3; 4/5	5.2; 2/3	–	10.8; 6	8.5; 4/5	7.1
Gizaker/Grupo Noticias (Note: "UPN se estanca y el cambio se abre paso con una participación histórica". Diario de Noticias (in Spanish). 17 May 2015. Archived from the original on 18 May 2015.)	13 May 2015	800	76.2	24.3; 13	11.5; 6	17.9; 10	16.1; 8	4.4; 2	3.1; 1	1.4; 0	14.3; 8	4.2; 2	6.4
CIES/Diario de Navarra	5–7 May 2015	1,228	71	28.5; 15/16	9.6; 5	15.1; 8	13.1; 6/7	5.6; 2/3	3.6; 1/2	–	13.8; 7/8	8.2; 4	13.4
inPactos	13–20 Apr 2015	508	?	25.5; 14	14.5; 8	12.5; 6	15.0; 8	4.0; 2	5.5; 3	–	13.5; 7	5.0; 2	10.5
CIS	23 Mar–19 Apr 2015	789	?	20.8; 11/12	11.2; 6	10.0; 5	12.5; 7	6.7; 3	5.1; 2	0.5; 0	19.9; 11	8.7; 4/5	0.9
CIES/Diario de Navarra	14–17 Apr 2015	800	71	26.1; 14/15	10.2; 5	17.1; 9	13.7; 7	6.4; 3	3.2; 0/1	–	14.7; 8	5.9; 3	9.0
Herkap	16–23 Mar 2015	400	78	22.5; 13	10.4; 5	7.8; 4	17.3; 9	9.5; 5	6.4; 3	–	13.9; 7	7.7; 4	5.2
Gizaker/Grupo Noticias (Note: "El desplome de UPN abre la puerta al cambio". Diario de Noticias (in Spanish). 22 March 2015. Archived from the original on 24 March 2015.)	9–11 Mar 2015	800	71.2	24.2; 13	13.9; 7	15.8; 9	14.4; 8	5.2; 2	3.3; 1	–	16.4; 9	3.0; 1	7.8
NC Report/La Razón	2–11 Mar 2015	400	?	22.3; 12/13	11.2; 6/7	9.4; 5/6	16.5; 8/9	10.2; 5/6	5.2; 2/3	–	8.6; 4/5	9.7; 5/6	5.8
CIES/Diario de Navarra	28 Nov 2014	?	?	? 15/16	? 6	? 4/5	? 9	? 1/2	? 2	–	? 12	–	?
Orbere/Parliament of Navarre	3–7 Nov 2014	1,500	64.5	15.3; 8	9.7; 5	8.6; 4	20.8; 11	3.2; 1	4.2; 2	2.8; 1	35.5; 18	–	14.7
Llorente & Cuenca	31 Oct 2014	?	?	? 15/17	? 7/8	? 7/9	? 7/10	? 3/4	? 2/4	–	? 0/1	–	?
Torrene Consulting/Gara	13–31 Oct 2014	400	69.9	23.1; 13	12.1; 6	11.3; 7	16.4; 9	8.5; 4	4.5; 2	–	15.6; 9	–	6.7
2014 EP election	25 May 2014	—N/a	44.5	–	14.5 (9)	2.5 (0)	20.2 (12)	25.1 (16)	9.5 (6)	4.6 (2)	9.3 (6)	1.8 (0)	4.9
inPactos (Note: "Encuesta marzo 2014". Ahotsa (in Spanish). 8 March 2014. Archived from the original on 10 March 2014.)	21–26 Feb 2014	500	?	23.5; 13	21.0; 11	16.5; 9	17.5; 9	5.0; 2	12.0; 6	–	–	–	2.5
NC Report/La Razón	15 Oct–12 Nov 2013	?	?	? 16/17	? 9	? 10/11	? 10	? 3	? 3/4	–	–	–	?
inPactos (Note: "Una encuesta predice el desplome UPN-PP y la posibilidad de un gobierno entre PSN, Geroa Bai e I-E". Diario de Noticias (in Spanish). 30 September 2013.)	30 Sep 2013	500	?	28.0; 15	19.5; 11	16.0; 9	14.0; 7	5.0; 2	11.5; 6	–	–	–	8.5
Gizaker/Grupo Noticias	8–13 May 2013	800	66.9	26.8; 15	16.1; 8	19.1; 10	20.0; 11	5.2; 2	7.3; 4	–	–	–	6.8
NC Report/La Razón	15 Apr–10 May 2013	250	?	? 18	16.2; 9	? 8	? 8	8.3; 4	? 3	–	–	–	?
Geroa Bai (Note: "Navarra: ¿Uxue Presidenta?". El mundo en cifras (in Spanish). 10 May 2013. Archived from the original on 9 June 2013.)	9 May 2013	?	?	27.3; 13/15	10.7; 5/6	21.3; 10/12	19.0; 10/12	5.5; 2/3	9.5; 4/6	–	–	–	6.0
Gara	23 Apr 2012	625	70	35.0; 19	13.0; 7	16.9; 9	18.7; 10	4.8; 2	6.8; 3	–	–	–	16.3
2011 general election	20 Nov 2011	—N/a	68.9	(Note: Within PP.)	22.0 (12)	12.8 (7)	14.9 (Note: Results for Amaiur.) (8)	38.2 (20)	5.5 (3)	2.1 (0)	–	–	16.2
2011 regional election	22 May 2011	—N/a	67.4	34.5; 19	15.9; 9	15.4; 8	13.3; 7	7.3; 4	5.7; 3	0.7; 0	–	–	18.6

=== Voting preferences ===
The table below lists raw, unweighted voting preferences.

Polling firm/Commissioner	Fieldwork date	Sample size	UPN	PSN–PSOE	GBai	EH Bildu	PP	I–E (n)	UPyD	Podemos	C's	Question	X mark	Lead
2015 regional election (Note: Does not include non-resident citizens.)	24 May 2015	—N/a	19.2	9.5	11.2	10.1	2.8	2.6	0.4	9.7	2.1	—N/a	28.6	8.0
CIS	23 Mar–19 Apr 2015	789	7.2	6.6	5.5	10.7	3.3	3.3	0.3	15.3	4.7	31.5	9.2	4.6
Gizaker/Grupo Noticias	9–11 Mar 2015	800	10.5	6.9	11.0	9.5	2.3	3.1	–	16.0	2.3	20.1	13.8	5.0
Orbere/Parliament of Navarre	3–7 Nov 2014	1,500	8.4	5.7	5.1	12.6	1.8	2.4	1.4	19.4	–	27.2	11.6	6.8
Torrene Consulting/Gara	13–31 Oct 2014	400	10.9	5.7	3.6	8.9	3.9	2.6	–	10.4	–	14.1	38.5	0.5
2014 EP election	25 May 2014	—N/a	–	6.6	1.2	9.2	11.5	4.3	2.1	4.3	0.8	—N/a	53.6	2.3
inPactos	21–26 Feb 2014	500	10.7	13.3	11.1	14.3	2.4	9.9	0.8	–	–	11.7	15.1	1.0
2011 general election	20 Nov 2011	—N/a		15.4	9.0	10.4	26.8	3.9	1.4	–	–	—N/a	28.7	11.4
2011 regional election	22 May 2011	—N/a	23.8	10.9	10.6	9.1	5.0	3.9	0.5	–	–	—N/a	30.3	12.9

=== Victory preferences ===
The table below lists opinion polling on the victory preferences for each party in the event of a regional election taking place.

Polling firm/Commissioner	Fieldwork date	Sample size	UPN	PSN–PSOE	GBai	EH Bildu	PP	I–E (n)	UPyD	Podemos	C's	Other/ None	Question	Lead
CIS	23 Mar–19 Apr 2015	789	10.0	9.0	6.9	11.3	3.5	3.2	0.3	17.3	4.7	9.0	24.9	6.0

=== Victory likelihood ===
The table below lists opinion polling on the perceived likelihood of victory for each party in the event of a regional election taking place.

Polling firm/Commissioner	Fieldwork date	Sample size	UPN	PSN–PSOE	GBai	EH Bildu	PP	Podemos	C's	Other/ None	Question	Lead
CIS	23 Mar–19 Apr 2015	789	47.9	4.5	2.2	2.4	3.1	4.7	0.1	1.2	33.8	43.2

=== Preferred President ===
The table below lists opinion polling on leader preferences to become president of the Government of Navarre.

Polling firm/Commissioner	Fieldwork date	Sample size									Other/ None/ Not care	Question	Lead
Polling firm/Commissioner	Fieldwork date	Sample size	Barcina UPN	Esparza UPN	Chivite PSN	Barkos GBai	Araiz EH Bildu	Beltrán PP	Nuin I–E (n)	Pérez Podemos	Other/ None/ Not care	Question	Lead
Gizaker/Grupo Noticias	13 May 2015	800	–	8.8	5.8	22.5	7.8	–	–	5.1	4.9	41.8	13.7
CIS	23 Mar–19 Apr 2015	789	–	7.3	4.2	18.5	7.4	1.8	2.3	3.7	3.1	51.7	11.1
Gizaker/Grupo Noticias	9–11 Mar 2015	800	1.8	5.3	3.3	16.0	5.9	–	–	6.0	10.6	51.1	10.0

== Results ==
← Summary of the 24 May 2015 Parliament of Navarre election results →
Parties and alliances	Popular vote			Seats	
Parties and alliances	Votes	%	±pp	Total	+/−
Navarrese People's Union (UPN)	92,705	27.44	−7.04	15	−4
Yes to the Future (GBai)^{1}	53,497	15.83	+0.42	9	+1
Basque Country Gather (EH Bildu)	48,166	14.25	+0.97	8	+1
We Can (Podemos/Ahal Dugu)	46,207	13.67	New	7	+7
Socialist Party of Navarre (PSN–PSOE)	45,164	13.37	−2.48	7	−2
People's Party (PP)	13,289	3.93	−3.36	2	−2
Left (I–E (n))	12,482	3.69	−2.02	2	−1
Citizens–Party of the Citizenry (C's)	9,993	2.96	New	0	±0
Animalist Party Against Mistreatment of Animals (PACMA)	2,304	0.68	New	0	±0
Equo–European Green Party (Equo)	2,170	0.64	New	0	±0
Union, Progress and Democracy (UPyD)	1,740	0.51	−0.17	0	±0
Navarrese Cannabis Representation (RCN/NOK)	1,733	0.51	−0.47	0	±0
Navarrese Freedom (Ln)	955	0.28	New	0	±0
Internationalist Solidarity and Self-Management (SAIn)	880	0.26	−0.07	0	±0
Blank ballots	6,610	1.96	−0.56		
Total	337,895			50	±0
Valid votes	337,895	98.75	−0.02		
Invalid votes	4,278	1.25	+0.02		
Votes cast / turnout	342,173	68.26	+0.83		
Abstentions	159,094	31.74	−0.83		
Registered voters	501,267				
Sources
Footnotes: ^{1} Yes to the Future results are compared to Navarre Yes 2011 totals in the 2011 election.

Popular vote
UPN	27.44%
GBai	15.83%
EH Bildu	14.25%
Podemos	13.67%
PSN–PSOE	13.37%
PP	3.93%
I–E (n)	3.69%
C's	2.96%
Others	2.89%
Blank ballots	1.96%

Seats
UPN	30.00%
GBai	18.00%
EH Bildu	16.00%
Podemos	14.00%
PSN–PSOE	14.00%
PP	4.00%
I–E (n)	4.00%

== Aftermath ==
=== Government formation ===
Investiture; Nomination of Uxue Barkos (GBai)
Ballot →	20 July 2015
Required majority →	26 out of 50
Yes: • GBai (9); • EH Bildu (8); • Podemos (7); • I–E (n) (2)	26 / 50
No: • UPN (15); • PP (2)	17 / 50
Abstentions: • PSN (7)	7 / 50
Absentees	0 / 50

== Bibliography ==
- Ley Orgánica 13/1982, de 10 de agosto, de reintegración y amejoramiento del Régimen Foral de Navarra (Organic Law 13/1982). Official State Gazette (in Spanish). 10 August 1982 [version as of 28 October 2010]. BOE-A-1982-20824.
- Ley Orgánica 5/1985, de 19 de junio, del Régimen Electoral General (Organic Law 5/1985). Official State Gazette (in Spanish). 19 June 1985 [version as of 31 March 2015]. BOE-A-1985-11672.
- Ley Foral 16/1986, de 17 de noviembre, reguladora de las elecciones al Parlamento de Navarra (Foral Law 16/1986). Official State Gazette (in Spanish). 17 November 1986 [version as of 11 June 2004]. BOE-A-1987-1255.
- Ley Foral 14/2004, de 3 de diciembre, del Gobierno de Navarra y de su Presidente (Foral Law 14/2004). Official State Gazette (in Spanish). 3 December 2004 [version as of 23 May 2008]. BOE-A-2005-1576.
- Decreto Foral 2/2015, de 30 de marzo, de la Presidenta de la Comunidad Foral de Navarra, de convocatoria de elecciones al Parlamento de Navarra (Foral Decree 2/2015). Official State Gazette (in Spanish). 30 March 2015. BOE-A-2015-3458.
