= Ana Beltrán =

Spanish politician (born 1966)

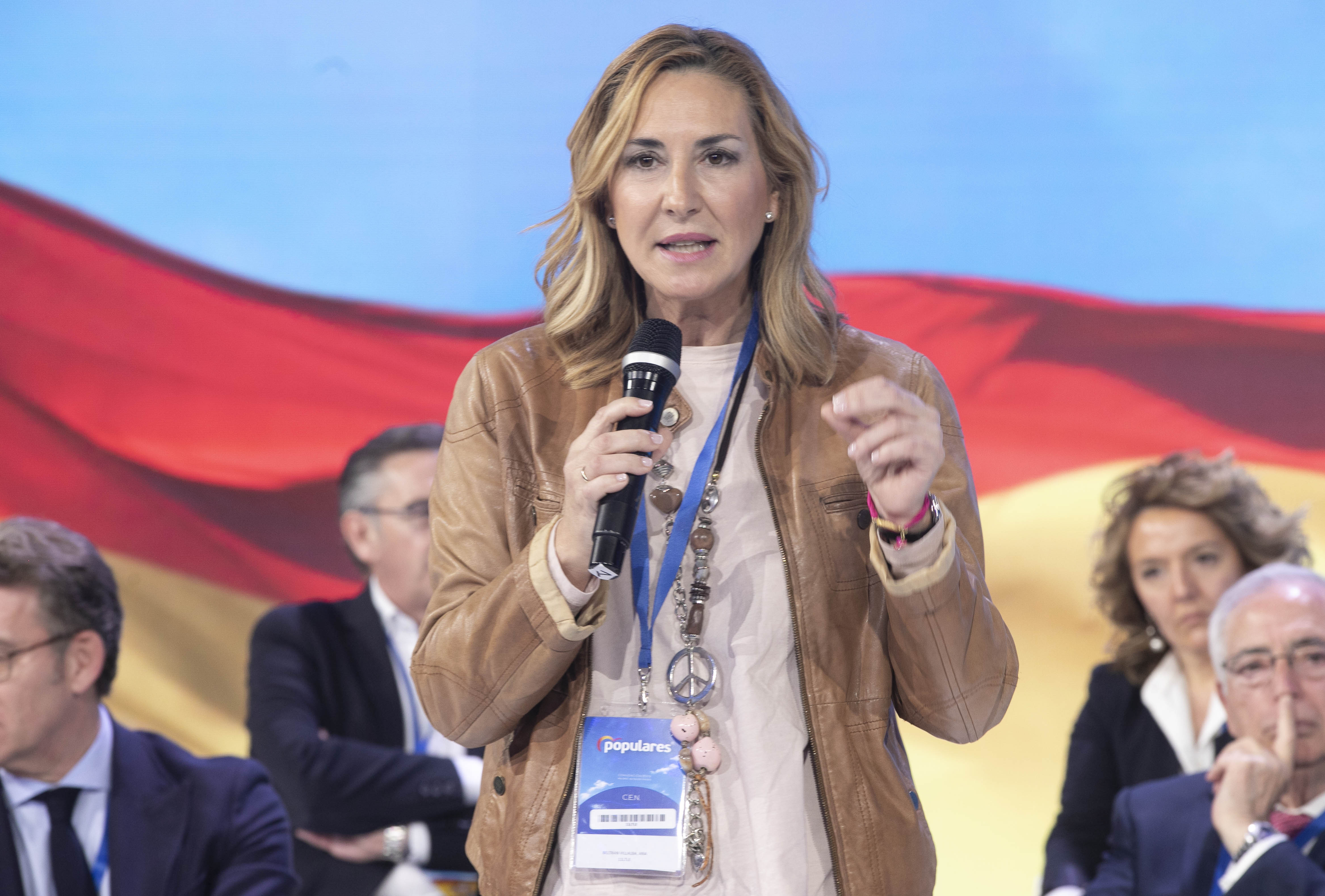

Ana María Beltrán Villalba (born 16 January 1966) is a Spanish People's Party (PP) politician. She served in the Parliament of Navarre from 2011 to 2019, in which she led her party, and was then elected to the Congress of Deputies. She has been president of the People's Party of Navarre since 2017, and the PP's Vice Secretary of Organisation since 2019.

== Early and personal life ==
Born in Zaragoza, Aragon, Beltrán graduated with a degree in Tourism and a master's degree in Senior Management from the University of Deusto, as well as a further master's degree in General Management from the IESE Business School of the University of Navarra. As of 2015, she was married and had four children.

From the age of 22 and until becoming a full-time politician in 2012, Beltrán managed the family wine company, Bodegas Camilo Castilla S.A. The company built up debts of nearly €1 million to the Navarrese treasury both before and after her management, going into liquidation for two years before exiting proceedings in 2019.

== Political career ==
In March 2015, the People's Party of Navarre (PPN) put Beltrán forward as their lead candidate in the May regional election. The party's seats halved to two. Two years later, she succeeded Pablo Zalba as PPN president, with 81.94% of the votes at the party congress.

PP national leader Pablo Casado named Beltrán in fifth place on the party list for the Madrid constituency for the April 2019 Spanish general election. In July, she became the party's Vice Secretary of Organisation.
