= Opinion polling for the 2015 Spanish general election =

In the run up to the 2015 Spanish general election, various organisations carried out opinion polling to gauge voting intention in Spain during the term of the 10th Cortes Generales. Results of such polls are displayed in this article. The date range for these opinion polls is from the previous general election, held on 20 November 2011, to the day the next election was held, on 20 December 2015.

Voting intention estimates refer mainly to a hypothetical Congress of Deputies election. Polls are listed in reverse chronological order, showing the most recent first. The dates of when the survey fieldwork was done are used, as opposed to the date of publication. Where the fieldwork dates are unknown, the date of publication is given instead. The highest percentage figure in each polling survey is displayed with its background shaded in the leading party's colour. If a tie ensues, this is applied to the figures with the highest percentages. The "Lead" columns on the right shows the percentage-point difference between the parties with the highest percentages in a poll.

== Electoral polling ==
=== Nationwide polling ===
==== Graphical summary ====
Local regression trend line of poll results from 20 November 2011 to 20 December 2015, with each line corresponding to a political party.

==== Voting intention estimates ====
The table below lists nationwide voting intention estimates. Refusals are generally excluded from the party vote percentages, while question wording and the treatment of "don't know" responses and those not intending to vote may vary between polling organisations. When available, seat projections determined by the polling organisations are displayed below (or in place of) the percentages in a smaller font; 176 seats were required for an absolute majority in the Congress of Deputies.

===== 2015 =====
Color key:

Poll conducted after legal ban on opinion polls Exit poll

Polling firm/Commissioner	Fieldwork date	Sample size	Turnout	PP	PSOE	IU–UPeC	UPYD	CiU	EH Bildu	PNV	ERC–CatSí	BNG	CC	Compromís	C's	Podemos	CDC DiL	Lead
2015 general election	20 Dec	—N/a	69.7	28.7; 123	22.0; 90	3.7; 2	0.6; 0	–	0.9; 2	1.2; 6	2.4; 9	0.3; 0	0.3; 1	(Note: Within Podemos.)	13.9; 40	20.7; 69	2.2; 8	6.7
TNS Demoscopia/RTVE–FORTA	20 Dec	177,100	?	26.8; 114/118	20.5; 81/85	4.1; 3/4	1.1; 0	–	1.0; 3/4	1.1; 4/5	2.5; 9/11	0.3; 0	0.3; 0/1		15.2; 47/50	21.7; 76/80	1.7; 6/7	5.1
Redondo & Asociados	18–19 Dec	1,790	?	29.3; 124	20.7; 83	3.3; 1	0.3; 0	–	1.2; 6	1.4; 6	1.7; 6	0.3; 0	0.4; 1		16.6; 53	19.5; 63	1.8; 7	8.6
GESOP/El Periòdic	17–19 Dec	950	75–77	26.6; 112/116	20.1; 76/80	4.0; 1/3	–	–	–	–	–	–	–		15.3; 45/49	21.5; 80/84	–	5.1
GESOP/El Periòdic	16–18 Dec	800	75–77	26.6; 111/115	20.8; 82/86	4.4; 2/4	–	–	–	–	–	–	–		15.5; 47/51	20.1; 70/74	–	5.8
GAD3/Antena 3	14–18 Dec	7,000	74	28.1; 121/124	20.4; 79/83	4.3; 2/4	–	–	0.9; 2/4	1.3; 5/6	2.7; 8/9	–	0.3; 0/1		14.9; 46/50	21.1; 70/74	1.8; 5/7	7.0
GESOP/El Periòdic	15–17 Dec	750	74–76	25.8; 107/111	21.4; 84/88	3.8; 2/4	–	–	–	–	–	–	–		16.0; 50/54	20.4; 71/75	–	4.4
GESOP/El Periòdic	14–16 Dec	700	74–76	26.2; 108/112	21.0; 83/87	3.7; 2/4	–	–	–	–	–	–	–		15.9; 50/54	20.4; 71/75	–	5.2
GESOP/El Periòdic	13–15 Dec	650	?	25.4; 106/110	20.6; 81/85	4.5; 3/5	–	–	–	–	–	–	–		16.3; 54/58	19.6; 66/70	–	4.8
GESOP/El Periòdic	12–14 Dec	700	?	25.4; 104/108	20.9; 81/85	4.8; 3/5	–	–	–	–	–	–	–		17.2; 57/61	19.0; 63/67	–	4.5
GAD3/Antena 3	7–14 Dec	3,200	?	28.6; 120/125	21.0; 79/82	3.9; 3/4	–	–	1.1; 5	1.3; 6	2.3; 8	–	0.4; 0/1		17.6; 60/63	17.9; 52/55	2.4; 9	7.6
Encuestamos	7–14 Dec	2,000	?	26.9; 116/120	22.9; 87/91	4.0; 1/5	–	–	1.1; 5/7	1.4; 5/6	2.2; 8/11	? 0/2	? 1/2		17.0; 45/49	18.6; 57/61	1.9; 8/10	4.0
GIPEyOP	27 Nov–14 Dec	14,005	?	23.3– 25.9; 99/111	20.0– 22.3; 77/89	3.3– 4.3; 1/6	0.6– 1.2; 0/1	–	0.9– 1.6; 4/7	0.9– 1.5; 4/7	2.7– 3.6; 11/14	0.3– 0.7; 0/2	0.3– 0.8; 1/3		15.4– 17.5; 48/59	18.6– 21.1; 62/74	2.2– 3.2; 8/11	3.3– 3.6
JM&A/Público	13 Dec	?	74.6	27.7; 120	18.6; 70	3.1; 1	0.3; 0	–	1.0; 5	1.3; 6	2.1; 8	0.5; 0	0.5; 1		20.1; 68	18.0; 61	2.3; 9	7.6
TNS Demoscopia/Antena 3	30 Nov–13 Dec	1,017	?	28.9	18.9	4.8	–	–	–	–	–	–	–		20.0	17.3	–	8.9
GESOP/El Periódico	10–12 Dec	800	?	25.2; 103/107	20.8; 80/84	? 3/5	–	–	–	–	–	–	–		18.0; 60/64	18.4; 59/63	–	4.4
NC Report/La Razón	9–12 Dec	3,000	75.8	29.9; 125/128	22.0; 88/92	3.3; 1	0.3; 0	–	1.1; 6	1.0; 6	2.0; 8	0.4; 1	0.3; 1		17.8; 55/62	16.3; 49/51	1.9; 7	7.9
Celeste-Tel/eldiario.es	7–11 Dec	1,100	72.7	28.1; 115/123	22.7; 85/92	3.5; 1/3	0.4; 0	–	1.1; 5/6	1.2; 5/6	2.0; 7/8	0.4; 0/1	0.3; 1		18.1; 53/61	17.0; 47/53	2.0; 7/8	5.4
InvyMark/laSexta	7–11 Dec	?	?	29.0	18.9	3.6	0.1	–	–	–	–	–	–		18.9	17.2	–	10.1
Demoscopia Servicios/esRadio	7–11 Dec	1,500	?	28.8; 123	19.7; 72	2.7; 1	0.2; 0	–	–	–	? 7	–	–		19.9; 70	17.9; 59	1.2; 7	8.9
Simple Lógica	1–11 Dec	1,005	70.3	27.0	18.2	5.2	0.6	–	–	0.7	–	–	–		20.9	17.2	2.0	6.1
Hamalgama Métrica/La Provincia	1–11 Dec	1,206	?	26.5; 100/120	22.7; 80/90	3.2; 4/6	0.5; 0	–	1.1; 4/6	1.1; 4/6	2.0; 8/11	–	0.2; 0/1		20.3; 60/80	18.1; 45/60	1.7; 7/9	3.8
GAD3/ABC	16 Nov–11 Dec	7,300	77	28.3; 117/124	21.2; 83/85	4.1; 3/5	0.3; 0	–	1.1; 5	1.3; 6	2.3; 8	0.3; 0	0.4; 1		18.1; 59/63	17.6; 50/53	2.4; 9	7.1
Metroscopia/El País	7–10 Dec	2,800	79	25.3; 105/112	21.0; 85/94	5.0; 1/3	–	–	–	–	–	–	–		18.2; 53/67	19.1; 55/64	–	4.3
IBES/Última Hora	7–10 Dec	1,800	?	27.7; 113/117	20.5; 86/90	4.3; 5/7	0.3; 0	–	1.1; 5/7	1.1; 4/6	2.1; 8/9	0.4; 0/1	0.3; 0/1		19.8; 65/69	16.2; 42/48	2.1; 8/9	7.2
MyWord/Cadena SER	3–9 Dec	1,500	?	26.5; 114/118	21.7; 82/86	4.0; 3/4	1.0; 0	–	–	–	–	–	–		18.6; 61/66	17.0; 51/57	–	4.8
Sigma Dos/El Mundo	1–9 Dec	8,350	?	27.2; 114/119	20.3; 76/81	3.7; 3/5	–	–	1.1; 4	1.2; 5	2.5; 9	–	? 0/1		19.6; 62/69	18.4; 56/60	2.4; 9	6.9
Redondo & Asociados	1–9 Dec	1,500	?	28.3; 120	20.8; 80	3.3; 1	–	–	1.2; 4	1.4; 6	1.9; 8	–	0.4; 1		19.8; 73	16.6; 50	1.8; 7	7.5
DYM/El Confidencial	27 Nov–9 Dec	1,012	?	26.7	17.0	6.3	–	–	–	–	–	–	–		23.2	19.1	–	3.5
Infortécnica	16 Nov–9 Dec	2,114	?	? 110/120	? 70/76	? 2/6	–	–	–	–	–	–	–		? 66/72	? 57/63	–	?
Encuestamos	1–7 Dec	1,800	?	26.7	24.9	4.9	–	–	1.0	1.5	2.2	–	–		16.2	16.4	1.9	1.8
JM&A/Público	6 Dec	?	70.1	26.6; 118	18.8; 75	3.1; 1	0.3; 0	–	1.0; 4	1.2; 6	2.0; 8	0.5; 0	0.5; 1		21.2; 75	16.6; 51	2.2; 10	5.4
TNS Demoscopia/Antena 3	23 Nov–6 Dec	1,035	?	27.9	20.4	4.3	–	–	–	–	–	–	–		21.9	15.1	–	6.0
Sondaxe/La Voz de Galicia	30 Nov–4 Dec	1,000	?	27.8; 124	19.4; 78	3.6; 1	–	–	0.7; 4	1.2; 7	2.1; 6	? 0	? 0		19.9; 63	18.2; 56	3.0; 9	7.9
Celeste-Tel/eldiario.es	30 Nov–4 Dec	1,100	71.7	28.2; 118/121	23.1; 90/93	3.8; 2/3	0.3; 0	–	1.0; 5/6	1.2; 5/6	1.9; 7/8	0.4; 0/1	0.3; 1		18.8; 61/67	16.2; 46/51	2.0; 7/8	5.1
InvyMark/laSexta	30 Nov–4 Dec	?	?	28.9	19.9	3.5	0.2	–	–	–	–	–	–		18.7	16.0	–	9.0
A+M/20minutos	23 Nov–4 Dec	5,000	73.8	28.1; 112/116	21.0; 78/82	3.8; 2	–	–	1.4; 6/7	1.4; 5	1.8; 9	–	0.1; 1		21.0; 70/72	15.1; 53/54	1.6; 7/8	7.1
NC Report/La Razón	23 Nov–4 Dec	1,500	74.6	29.8; 126/133	22.7; 89/92	3.7; 3	0.3; 0	–	1.0; 5	1.2; 6	2.0; 7/8	0.3; 1	0.4; 2		17.8; 55/62	15.6; 40/45	2.1; 8/9	7.1
Sigma Dos/Mediaset	1–3 Dec	1,800	?	27.5; 117/121	19.4; 70/74	4.0; 3/4	–	–	–	1.0 ?	2.0; 8/9	–	–		21.6; 75/79	17.2; 48/52	2.0; 8/9	5.9
GAD3/ABC	10 Nov–3 Dec	5,700	76	28.2; 120/123	21.5; 85/87	3.7; 1/3	0.3; 0	–	1.1; 5	1.5; 5	2.2; 8	0.2; 0	0.4; 1		17.9; 59/63	16.6; 51/52	2.5; 9	6.7
Encuestamos	25 Nov–1 Dec	1,800	?	26.5	25.2	5.3	–	–	1.1	1.4	2.2	0.6	0.4		15.8	16.3	1.9	1.3
Redondo & Asociados	25 Nov–1 Dec	1,500	?	28.1; 114	21.5; 84	3.9; 2	–	–	1.1; 4	1.3; 6	2.1; 8	–	0.5; 2		20.2; 74	15.3; 48	2.0; 7	6.6
TNS Demoscopia/Antena 3	16–29 Nov	1,033	?	27.1	20.0	4.0	0.3	–	–	–	–	–	–		21.6	15.5	–	5.5
GESOP/El Periódico	23–28 Nov	1,816	?	23.9; 98/102	21.4; 82/86	4.9; 4/6	–	–	–	–	2.7; 9/11	–	–		21.0; 76/80	16.0; 52/56	2.0; 7/8	2.5
Celeste-Tel/eldiario.es	23–27 Nov	1,100	?	28.1; 118/121	23.9; 95/98	3.6; 2/3	0.4; 0	–	1.0; 5/6	1.2; 5/6	1.9; 8/9	0.5; 0/1	0.4; 1/2		18.6; 57/61	15.3; 39/44	1.9; 8/9	4.2
InvyMark/laSexta	23–27 Nov	1,200	?	29.5	20.8	3.4	0.2	–	–	–	–	–	–		18.0	14.3	–	8.7
NC Report/La Razón	9–27 Nov	3,000	74.0	29.3; 125/130	23.1; 91/95	3.5; 3	0.3; 0	–	0.9; 5	1.2; 6	2.0; 7/8	0.3; 1	0.4; 2		17.4; 52/55	15.6; 42/46	2.1; 8/9	6.2
Sigma Dos/El Mundo	24–26 Nov	1,500	?	27.1; 111/115	20.2; 78/79	3.8; 3/5	–	–	–	1.1; 5/6	2.2; 8/9	–	–		23.0; 82/84	16.2; 43/45	2.2; 8/9	4.1
Demoscopia Servicios/esRadio	23–26 Nov	1,500	?	28.3; 117	21.2; 83	4.1; 2	0.2; 0	–	1.1; 4	1.3; 6	2.1; 8	–	? 2		19.9; 72	15.5; 48	2.0; 7	7.1
GAD3/ABC	2–26 Nov	4,300	74.5	28.3; 125	23.1; 91	4.0; 3	0.3; 0	–	1.3; 5	1.4; 5	2.5; 9	0.2; 0	0.4; 1		17.4; 59	14.9; 41	2.5; 9	5.2
Metroscopia/El País	23–25 Nov	1,200	78	22.7	22.5	5.2	–	–	–	–	–	–	–		22.6	17.1	–	0.1
Encuestamos	18–24 Nov	1,800	?	26.6	25.4	6.2	–	–	0.9	1.4	2.1	0.6	0.4		15.1	16.0	1.9	1.2
Deimos Estadística	22 Nov	?	?	25.0; 111	21.7; 88	5.0; 6	–	–	1.6; 7	1.6; 6	2.7; 10	0.5; 1	0.5; 2		20.2; 62	16.8; 47	2.2; 8	3.3
TNS Demoscopia/Antena 3	9–22 Nov	1,018	?	27.4	20.6	4.3	0.2	–	–	–	–	–	–		21.3	14.3	–	6.1
Celeste-Tel/eldiario.es	16–20 Nov	1,100	71.4	27.5; 115/118	23.9; 97/100	3.4; 2/3	0.4; 0	–	1.0; 5/6	1.2; 5/6	1.8; 7/8	0.5; 0/1	0.4; 1/2		18.9; 59/63	15.1; 36/42	2.0; 8/9	3.6
JM&A/Público	19 Nov	?	69.9	27.2; 121	18.7; 76	4.2; 4	0.5; 0	–	1.2; 5	1.3; 6	2.7; 11	–	0.5; 2		19.5; 70	15.9; 46	2.2; 8	7.7
GAD3/ABC	26 Oct–19 Nov	3,000	75	28.5; 129	22.8; 93	4.4; 2	0.2; 0	–	1.3; 5	1.5; 5	2.6; 10	0.2; 0	0.3; 0		16.4; 52	15.6; 44	2.2; 9	5.7
Encuestamos	1–17 Nov	1,800	?	26.2	25.7	6.8	–	–	1.0	1.5	1.9	–	–		15.0	15.4	2.1	0.5
Simple Lógica	2–16 Nov	1,746	74.5	26.5	20.4	4.5	0.6	–	–	0.9	–	–	–		21.9	16.9	1.6	4.6
CIS	27 Oct–16 Nov	17,452	?	28.6; 120/128	20.8; 77/89	3.6; 3/4	0.7; 0	–	1.2; 6/7	1.1; 5	1.9; 7	0.3; 0	0.3; 1		19.0; 63/66	15.7; 45/49	2.2; 0	7.8
TNS Demoscopia/Antena 3	2–15 Nov	1,018	?	26.4	20.5	5.1	0.4	–	–	–	–	–	–		20.4	14.2	–	5.9
Sigma Dos/Mediaset	11–13 Nov	?	?	27.3; 112/115	20.3; 77/79	4.7; 5/6	–	–	–	–	–	–	–		21.4; 73/75	15.7; 42/44	–	5.9
InvyMark/laSexta	9–13 Nov	?	?	28.5	22.2	3.2	0.2	–	–	–	–	–	–		18.2	14.0	–	6.7
Celeste-Tel/eldiario.es	9–13 Nov	1,100	71.2	27.1; 114/118	23.8; 97/101	3.5; 2/3	0.4; 0	–	1.0; 5/6	1.3; 5/6	1.7; 7/8	0.5; 0/1	0.4; 1/2		19.5; 63/68	14.6; 33/39	2.1; 8/9	3.3
GAD3/ABC	19 Oct–12 Nov	3,100	75	27.9; 127	22.1; 89	4.9; 5	0.4; 0	–	1.4; 6	1.6; 6	2.5; 9	0.4; 1	0.4; 1	0.9; 2	17.9; 56	13.7; 37	2.2; 9	5.8
Sondaxe/La Voz de Galicia	28 Oct–9 Nov	1,000	?	29.4	19.3	3.7	0.6	–	0.6	1.1	1.6	0.3	0.3	–	20.9	15.2	2.7	8.5
IBES/Última Hora	8 Nov	2,508	?	27.4; 118	20.3; 93	4.4; 6	0.5; 0	–	1.2; 6	1.0; 6	3.1; 10	0.4; 0	0.2; 1	0.5; 2	18.0; 58	15.0; 40	2.8; 9	7.1
TNS Demoscopia/Antena 3	26 Oct–8 Nov	1,014	?	26.3	19.6	4.7	0.6	–	–	–	–	–	–	–	20.2	15.0	–	6.1
Celeste-Tel/eldiario.es	2–6 Nov	1,100	71.1	26.4; 118/122	24.0; 102/104	4.2; 4/5	0.6; 0	–	1.1; 6/7	1.3; 5/6	1.7; 6/7	0.7; 1/2	0.4; 1/2	1.1; 4	21.1; 58/62	10.8; 26/30	2.3; 9/10	2.4
Demoscopia Servicios/esRadio	29 Oct–6 Nov	1,800	?	29.0; 123	22.3; 91	5.3; 8	0.6; 0	–	–	? 6	? 7	–	–	–	18.1; 64	13.4; 32	2.4; 9	6.7
JM&A/Público	4 Nov	?	68.3	28.0; 125	18.2; 72	3.7; 2	0.3; 0	–	1.3; 6	1.3; 6	1.9; 8	–	0.6; 2	0.9; 1	19.7; 68	14.8; 44	3.0; 13	8.3
GAD3/ABC	14 Oct–4 Nov	3,300	75.5	28.1; 128	22.4; 89	4.6; 5	0.2; 0	–	1.4; 5	1.6; 6	2.5; 10	0.5; 2	0.5; 2	0.9; 2	17.7; 55	13.2; 35	2.4; 9	5.7
TNS Demoscopia/Antena 3	19 Oct–1 Nov	1,010	?	26.7	19.3	4.4	0.4	–	–	–	–	–	–	–	19.8	15.4	–	6.9
GAD3/ABC	14–29 Oct	2,800	75.5	27.8; 128	22.1; 88	4.4; 5	0.2; 0	–	1.4; 5	1.6; 6	2.6; 9	0.6; 2	0.5; 2	0.9; 2	17.5; 55	13.9; 37	2.6; 9	5.7
Metroscopia/El País	26–28 Oct	1,400	77	23.5; 93/100	21.0; 88/98	6.3; 5	–	–	–	–	–	–	–	–	22.5; 72/84	17.0; 42/46	–	1.0
MyWord/Cadena SER	22–26 Oct	1,001	?	26.3	21.6	3.1	1.0	–	–	–	–	–	–	–	18.6	14.9	–	4.7
DYM/El Confidencial	15–26 Oct	1,002	?	27.0	18.2	6.1	–	–	–	–	–	–	–	–	20.3	13.8	–	6.7
Encuestamos	3–26 Oct	1,800	?	23.5	26.3	7.7	–	–	0.9	1.4	2.0	–	–	–	15.2	15.4	2.3	2.8
TNS Demoscopia/Antena 3	12–25 Oct	1,009	?	26.0	20.5	4.4	0.5	–	–	–	–	–	–	–	19.2	14.6	–	5.5
InvyMark/laSexta	19–23 Oct	?	?	28.6	23.9	3.0	0.1	–	–	–	–	–	–	–	18.3	13.5	–	4.7
JM&A/Público	22 Oct	?	71.1	27.4; 120	22.9; 94	3.7; 2	0.3; 0	–	1.1; 5	1.2; 6	1.6; 7	–	0.6; 2	0.7; 1	17.7; 59	14.5; 39	2.9; 12	4.5
Demoscopia Servicios/13TV	19–22 Oct	1,500	?	29.5; 127	24.1; 92	4.5; 4	–	–	1.0; 4	1.3; 6	1.6; 6	–	? 1	? 1	16.6; 57	13.7; 41	2.5; 10	5.4
GAD3/ABC	14 Sep–19 Oct	2,600	75.5	27.7; 128	21.8; 84	4.1; 4	0.3; 0	–	1.5; 6	1.6; 6	2.5; 9	0.6; 2	0.5; 2	0.9; 1	17.6; 56	14.1; 39	2.7; 11	5.9
TNS Demoscopia/Antena 3	5–18 Oct	1,050	?	26.7	21.3	4.2	0.7	–	–	–	–	–	–	–	18.1	14.3	–	5.4
NC Report/La Razón	12–17 Oct	1,500	69.8	31.3; 125/130	24.9; 109/112	4.1; 3/5	0.4; 0	–	1.1; 5/6	1.3; 7/8	1.9; 6/7	0.6; 1/2	0.4; 1/2	1.1; 3/4	15.4; 32/38	10.3; 23/25	2.2; 9/10	6.4
Sigma Dos/Mediaset	13–15 Oct	1,800	?	27.4	23.7	4.1	–	–	–	1.5	2.0	–	–	–	18.1	16.3	2.2	3.7
NC Report	8–15 Oct	?	?	30.9	24.5	4.0	–	–	–	–	–	–	–	–	14.9	12.4	–	6.4
CIS	1–12 Oct	2,493	?	29.1	25.3	4.7	1.2	–	1.2	0.7	2.2	0.5	0.6	1.4	14.7	10.8	2.9	3.8
TNS Demoscopia/Antena 3	28 Sep–11 Oct	1,072	?	26.9	21.0	4.3	0.7	–	–	–	–	–	–	–	17.8	14.2	–	5.9
InvyMark/laSexta	5–9 Oct	?	?	27.6	24.6	2.0	0.1	–	–	1.4	2.6	–	–	–	17.2	16.1	2.8	3.0
Simple Lógica	1–9 Oct	1,047	70.0	28.0	20.3	6.2	0.7	–	–	0.3	–	–	–	–	22.6	11.9	1.7	5.4
Metroscopia/El País	7–8 Oct	1,200	77	23.4	23.5	5.6	–	–	–	–	–	–	–	–	21.5	14.1	–	0.1
Celeste-Tel/eldiario.es	1–7 Oct	1,100	70.8	28.9; 121/125	27.1; 106/108	4.4; 4/5	0.5; 0	–	1.0; 6/7	1.3; 5/6	1.5; 6/7	0.7; 1/2	0.4; 1/2	1.0; 3	16.2; 56/59	10.1; 20/23	2.0; 8/9	1.8
TNS Demoscopia/Antena 3	21 Sep–4 Oct	1,040	?	27.0	21.9	4.5	0.7	–	–	–	–	–	–	–	16.5	14.8	–	5.1
Demoscopia Servicios/esRadio	29 Sep–2 Oct	1,000	?	30.4; 139	26.5; 111	4.4; 7	0.3; 0	–	–	? 6	? 6	–	–	–	12.3; 27	16.7; 36	2.2; 8	3.9
NC Report/La Razón	28 Sep–2 Oct	1,500	69.1	33.8; 136/139	24.8; 108/112	4.2; 3/5	0.4; 0	–	1.2; 5/6	1.2; 7/8	2.0; 7/8	0.6; 1/2	0.4; 1/2	1.2; 3/4	11.7; 26/28	11.2; 26/27	2.5; 9/10	9.0
Intercampo/GETS	8 Sep–2 Oct	2,321	?	25.0– 28.0	29.0– 32.0	4.0– 6.0	0.1– 0.3	–	–	1.4– 2.0	2.0– 4.0	–	–	–	11.0– 15.0	16.0– 18.0	0.7– 1.5	4.0
JM&A/Público	1 Oct	?	69.8	28.3; 124	22.7; 96	3.7; 2	0.5; 0	–	0.9; 3	1.2; 6	1.8; 8	–	0.6; 3	1.1; 3	15.4; 42	15.0; 48	3.1; 11	5.6
TNS Demoscopia/Antena 3	14–27 Sep	1,060	?	27.9	23.0	4.2	0.8	–	–	–	–	–	–	–	14.0	15.9	–	4.9
Podemos	10–24 Sep	1,738	?	27.0– 29.0	19.0– 21.0	3.0– 4.0	–	–	–	–	–	–	–	–	19.0– 21.0	19.0– 21.0	–	8.0
Encuestamos	3–24 Sep	1,600	?	26.2	26.1	6.1	–	–	0.8	1.5	2.1	–	–	–	11.0	17.9	2.5	0.1
TNS Demoscopia/Antena 3	7–20 Sep	1,054	?	28.6	22.5	4.8	0.7	–	–	–	–	–	–	–	13.7	16.2	–	6.1
TNS Demoscopia/Antena 3	31 Aug–13 Sep	1,040	?	29.0	22.0	4.2	0.8	–	–	–	–	–	–	–	13.2	16.5	–	7.0
Metroscopia/El País	7–11 Sep	1,800	73	23.4	24.6	5.0	0.9	–	–	–	–	–	–	–	16.1	18.6	–	1.2
Demoscopia Servicios/esRadio	3–11 Sep	1,800	?	31.7; 153	25.6; 102	3.9; 5	0.4; 0	–	–	? 6	? 5	–	–	–	10.5; 18	18.2; 41	2.3; 9	6.1
Simple Lógica	1–9 Sep	?	?	28.0	19.1	5.0	1.5	–	–	1.1	–	–	–	–	19.6	16.1	2.8	8.4
Celeste-Tel/eldiario.es	1–7 Sep	1,100	66.8	32.0; 134/137	27.4; 116/120	4.6; 2/4	0.6; 0	–	1.1; 5/6	1.3; 5/7	1.6; 8/9	0.8; 1/2	0.4; 1/2	1.1; 3/5	10.0; 17/19	12.2; 31/36	2.1; 10/11	4.6
TNS Demoscopia/Antena 3	24 Aug–6 Sep	1,096	?	28.6	22.5	3.9	1.0	–	–	–	–	–	–	–	12.7	16.0	–	6.1
Sondaxe/La Voz de Galicia	26 Aug–5 Sep	1,000	?	31.5; 118	22.7; 85	3.7; 14	0.5; 2	–	0.8; 3	1.1; 4	1.6; 6	0.5; 2	0.3; 1	–	11.8; 44	16.3; 61	2.4; 9	8.8
JM&A/Público	30 Aug	?	69.8	29.5; 127	22.4; 93	3.3; 2	0.6; 0	–	0.9; 3	1.2; 6	1.8; 8	–	0.6; 3	1.1; 3	12.7; 33	16.7; 56	3.1; 12	7.1
TNS Demoscopia/Antena 3	17–30 Aug	1,118	?	28.5	22.8	4.2	0.9	–	–	–	–	–	–	–	12.3	16.2	–	5.7
NC Report/La Razón	25–29 Aug	900	67.3	32.1; 138/141	24.9; 107/114	4.4; 4/5	1.0; 0/1	–	1.1; 5	1.3; 5	1.7; 7/8	0.6; 1/2	0.4; 1/2	1.5; 2/3	10.4; 21/23	12.1; 30/32	2.3; 8/9	7.2
MyWord/Cadena SER	20–27 Aug	1,001	?	28.3	25.9	2.6	1.5	–	–	–	–	–	–	–	11.3	15.4	–	2.4
TNS Demoscopia/Antena 3	10–23 Aug	1,112	?	27.3	22.6	4.5	0.9	–	–	–	–	–	–	–	13.2	16.3	–	4.7
Encuestamos	1–23 Aug	1,500	?	27.5	26.0	5.7	–	–	1.1	1.6	1.9	–	–	–	8.6	19.4	2.1	1.5
TNS Demoscopia/Antena 3	3–16 Aug	1,086	?	27.0	22.9	4.5	0.8	–	–	–	–	–	–	–	12.9	16.5	–	4.1
Simple Lógica	3–11 Aug	1,022	72.2	29.9	21.4	5.4	1.2	–	–	1.0	–	–	–	–	17.1	16.5	1.2	8.5
TNS Demoscopia/Antena 3	27 Jul–9 Aug	1,080	?	26.4	22.4	4.7	1.0	–	–	–	–	–	–	–	13.4	16.8	–	4.0
Celeste-Tel/eldiario.es	3–7 Aug	1,100	66.3	31.4; 135/137	27.6; 118/121	4.6; 2/4	0.8; 0	–	0.9; 5/6	1.1; 5/7	1.6; 8/9	0.7; 1/2	0.4; 1/2	1.2; 3/4	9.9; 18/20	11.9; 30/34	2.0; 8/9	3.8
TNS Demoscopia/Antena 3	20 Jul–2 Aug	1,075	?	25.7	22.9	5.0	1.2	–	–	–	–	–	–	–	13.6	16.9	–	2.8
TNS Demoscopia/Antena 3	13–26 Jul	920	?	26.8	23.0	4.0	1.2	–	–	–	–	–	–	–	13.7	17.6	–	3.8
Demoscopia Servicios/esRadio	16–24 Jul	1,800	?	30.5; 142	25.1; 98	3.3; 4	0.7; 0	–	–	? 6	? 6	–	–	–	10.6; 17	19.3; 56	2.5; 10	5.4
Sigma Dos/Mediaset	21–23 Jul	1,800	?	28.8	24.2	4.2	–	–	–	1.3	2.1	–	–	–	11.1	20.3	2.1	4.6
Metroscopia/El País	20–22 Jul	1,000	72	23.1	23.5	5.6	0.3	–	–	–	–	–	–	–	16.0	18.1	–	0.4
Encuestamos	1–20 Jul	1,450	?	26.0	25.4	4.1	–	–	1.0	1.8	2.4	0.9	0.5	1.8	9.2	21.1	2.9	0.6
TNS Demoscopia/Antena 3	6–19 Jul	910	?	27.1	22.6	2.9	0.8	–	–	–	–	–	–	–	13.5	18.6	–	4.5
NC Report	8–16 Jul	955	?	31.7	24.8	4.5	–	–	–	–	–	–	–	–	11.0	12.3	–	6.9
TNS Demoscopia/Antena 3	29 Jun–12 Jul	1,000	?	26.1	22.2	2.8	0.9	–	–	–	–	–	–	–	13.6	19.1	–	3.9
InvyMark/laSexta	6–10 Jul	1,200	?	27.7	23.3	2.0	0.2	–	–	1.4	2.8	–	–	–	11.5	21.9	2.6	4.4
CIS	1–9 Jul	2,486	?	28.2	24.9	3.7	1.3	–	1.1	1.3	2.1	0.7	0.4	1.2	11.1	15.7	3.3	3.3
Simple Lógica	1–9 Jul	1,040	71.5	26.2	23.1	5.4	0.5	–	–	1.0	–	–	–	–	18.4	14.9	1.4	3.1
GAD3/ABC	23 Jun–8 Jul	1,000	71	29.1; 131	25.5; 106	3.6; 2	0.3; 0	–	1.3; 6	1.2; 5	2.3; 9	0.6; 2	0.6; 2	0.9; 2	12.1; 32	15.0; 41	2.7; 11	3.6
Celeste-Tel/eldiario.es	1–7 Jul	1,100	66.0	30.7; 133/135	27.4; 118/123	4.8; 3/5	1.0; 0	–	0.9; 5/6	1.1; 5/7	1.7; 8/9	0.7; 1/2	0.4; 1/2	1.2; 3/4	10.2; 20/21	13.3; 33/37	1.8; 7/8	3.3
TNS Demoscopia/Antena 3	22 Jun–5 Jul	?	?	26.0	22.8	2.9	0.8	–	–	–	–	–	–	–	12.5	19.2	–	3.2
Metroscopia/El País	1–2 Jul	1,000	72	23.0	22.5	4.0	0.5	–	–	–	–	–	–	–	15.0	21.5	–	0.5
TNS Demoscopia/Antena 3	15–28 Jun	?	?	26.9	22.6	3.0	1.5	–	–	–	–	–	–	–	11.7	19.3	–	4.3
NC Report/La Razón	22–27 Jun	900	66.9	31.2; 136/144	24.4; 108/116	4.4; 4/6	1.1; 0/1	–	1.1; 5	1.2; 5	1.8; 7/8	0.5; 1	0.3; 1	1.5; 3	11.6; 25/27	12.5; 30/33	2.2; 8/9	6.8
InvyMark/laSexta	22–26 Jun	1,200	?	25.9	23.0	1.9	0.4	–	–	1.4	2.7	–	–	–	13.2	23.0	2.6	2.9
Demoscopia Servicios/esRadio	16–26 Jun	1,800	?	29.2; 131	24.4; 92	2.8; 2	0.6; 0	2.6; 12	1.0; 5	1.2; 6	1.6; 6	0.4; 0	0.7; 3	0.7; 3	11.8; 23	20.2; 65	–	4.8
Encuestamos	1–23 Jun	1,450	?	25.7	25.2	4.3	–	2.9	1.1	1.6	2.2	0.9	0.6	1.9	9.8	21.4	–	0.5
TNS Demoscopia/Antena 3	8–21 Jun	?	?	26.6	22.0	3.3	1.9	–	–	–	–	–	–	–	12.8	19.7	–	4.6
JM&A/Público	19 Jun	?	?	26.8; 118	22.7; 95	3.9; 2	0.6; 0	? 11	? 3	? 5	? 7	–	–	–	14.7; 43	17.1; 58	–	3.3
Sigma Dos/Mediaset	15–17 Jun	1,800	?	27.0	26.1	4.1	–	2.5	–	1.5	2.5	–	–	–	10.3	20.2	–	0.9
TNS Demoscopia/Antena 3	1–14 Jun	1,087	?	23.8	21.1	4.4	1.0	–	–	–	–	–	–	–	15.5	19.2	–	2.7
Simple Lógica	1–10 Jun	1,026	?	23.8	19.4	4.1	0.6	1.3	–	1.3	–	–	–	–	17.3	23.3	–	0.5
NC Report/La Razón	2–6 Jun	900	66.6	29.7; 134/144	24.2; 106/108	4.9; 5/7	1.4; 0/1	2.5; 10/12	1.0; 5	1.3; 5	1.9; 7/9	0.5; 1	0.3; 1	1.4; 2/3	11.6; 28/30	12.1; 28/30	–	5.5
Celeste-Tel/eldiario.es	1–5 Jun	1,100	65.9	30.1; 134/138	27.2; 118/125	4.7; 4/6	1.0; 0	2.6; 10/11	1.0; 4/5	1.1; 5/6	1.9; 8/9	0.7; 1/2	0.4; 1/2	1.3; 3	10.5; 20/22	13.2; 31/35	–	2.9
Metroscopia/El País	28 May–2 Jun	2,000	72	24.5	23.0	4.1	0.4	–	–	–	–	–	–	–	13.0	21.5	–	1.5
InvyMark/laSexta	25–29 May	1,200	?	25.4	22.0	2.5	0.8	2.6	–	1.4	2.8	–	–	–	15.2	21.9	–	3.4
2015 local elections	24 May	—N/a	64.8	27.0	25.0	4.9	1.0	3.0	1.4	1.6	2.3	0.8	0.7	1.7	6.6	–	–	2.0
JM&A/Público	18 May	?	?	? 115	? 94	? 3	? 0	? 12	? 4	? 6	? 8	–	–	–	? 45	? 59	–	?
JM&A/Público	13 May	?	65.3	25.7; 111	22.4; 93	3.7; 2	0.6; 0	? 12	? 4	? 6	? 8	–	–	–	15.3; 46	17.7; 64	–	3.3
Simple Lógica	4–12 May	1,064	?	25.9	19.2	3.9	1.7	2.0	–	1.3	–	–	–	–	18.9	18.6	–	6.7
Encuestamos	1–12 May	1,000	?	23.0	24.3	4.8	0.7	2.5	1.0	1.3	2.6	1.1	0.5	1.1	14.9	20.7	–	1.3
Celeste-Tel	4–8 May	1,100	65.3	29.2; 132/136	26.6; 120/123	5.2; 7/8	1.2; 1/2	2.5; 9/10	1.0; 5/6	1.1; 5/6	1.8; 7/8	0.7; 1/2	0.6; 2	1.0; 2/3	12.1; 22/25	12.9; 26/32	–	2.6
NC Report/La Razón	20–25 Apr	900	?	28.6	23.8	6.8	2.0	–	–	–	–	–	–	–	12.0	12.9	–	4.8
MyWord/Cadena SER	17–22 Apr	1,000	?	22.0	21.0	3.1	1.8	–	–	–	–	–	–	–	19.4	17.9	–	1.0
Encuestamos	2–20 Apr	1,000	?	22.9	24.0	4.5	0.9	2.8	1.1	1.0	3.0	–	–	–	15.8	21.2	–	1.1
InvyMark/laSexta	13–17 Apr	?	?	26.2	21.0	2.9	1.0	2.7	–	1.3	2.7	–	–	–	17.6	19.4	–	5.2
NC Report	8–16 Apr	?	?	28.6	23.7	6.6	–	–	–	–	–	–	–	–	11.7	13.2	–	4.9
GESOP/El Periódico	8–13 Apr	1,000	?	23.5; 102/107	19.1; 75/78	3.7; 2/4	1.4; 1/2	2.9; 10/12	–	–	1.9; 6/8	–	–	–	17.7; 55/59	20.1; 78/82	–	3.4
Simple Lógica	1–13 Apr	1,059	67.4	21.3	21.1	4.1	1.2	2.0	–	1.3	–	–	–	–	20.8	21.3	–	Tie
CIS	1–12 Apr	2,479	?	25.6	24.3	4.8	1.9	3.2	0.9	0.7	2.0	0.6	0.5	0.8	13.8	16.5	–	1.3
Sigma Dos/Mediaset	7–9 Apr	1,800	?	26.6	19.7	4.4	1.1	2.1	–	1.2	2.3	–	–	–	16.6	20.9	–	5.7
Metroscopia/El País	7–9 Apr	1,000	74	20.8	21.9	5.0	2.0	–	–	–	–	–	–	–	19.4	22.1	–	0.2
Celeste-Tel	1–8 Apr	1,100	64.6	29.5; 134/138	26.6; 120/123	5.1; 7/8	1.3; 1/2	2.4; 9/10	1.0; 5/6	1.1; 5/6	1.8; 7/8	0.8; 1/2	0.7; 2	0.9; 2/3	12.1; 22/25	12.8; 25/31	–	2.9
NC Report/La Razón	30 Mar–2 Apr	900	65.6	29.7; 136/142	23.5; 99/107	6.0; 8/10	2.4; 2/3	2.7; 11/12	0.9; 5	1.2; 5	2.1; 8/9	0.4; 1	0.4; 2	0.7; 2	10.5; 21/27	14.1; 35/41	–	6.2
Intercampo/GETS	13–29 Mar	2,024	80	26.0– 27.0	27.0– 28.0	4.0– 5.0	1.0– 1.5	1.5– 2.0	–	1.0– 1.5	1.5– 2.5	–	–	–	10.0– 11.0	21.0– 22.0	–	1.0
InvyMark/laSexta	23–27 Mar	1,200	?	26.4	20.3	3.0	1.6	–	–	–	–	–	–	–	14.8	20.8	–	5.6
Encuestamos	26 Mar	900	?	23.7	23.6	3.8	2.5	3.1	1.3	1.2	2.1	–	–	–	14.7	21.7	–	0.1
Simple Lógica	2–13 Mar	1,058	70.5	23.0	18.7	5.1	3.2	2.4	–	1.3	–	–	–	–	18.0	21.0	–	2.0
MyWord/Cadena SER	4–9 Mar	1,000	?	22.0	19.1	2.9	2.3	–	–	–	–	–	–	–	18.8	23.4	–	1.4
Celeste-Tel	2–6 Mar	1,100	63.6	30.9; 139/143	26.4; 118/121	4.9; 8/9	1.3; 1/2	2.4; 8/9	1.1; 5/6	1.0; 5/6	1.9; 7/8	0.8; 1/2	0.7; 2/3	0.6; 2	11.7; 20/23	12.2; 22/28	–	4.5
Metroscopia/El País	3–4 Mar	1,000	74.6	18.6	20.2	5.6	3.6	–	–	–	–	–	–	–	18.4	22.5	–	2.3
JM&A/El Español	1 Mar	?	68.0	25.9; 114	18.6; 80	4.3; 4	3.1; 2	2.8; 11	1.2; 5	1.1; 5	2.0; 8	0.3; 0	0.4; 1	0.6; 1	9.4; 19	24.1; 99	–	1.8
Encuestamos	26 Feb	600	?	25.5	19.9	4.5	3.8	3.2	1.4	1.3	2.2	–	–	–	10.1	25.4	–	0.1
InvyMark/laSexta	23–26 Feb	?	?	27.8	21.5	3.8	4.0	2.8	–	1.3	2.8	–	–	–	6.4	23.6	–	4.2
NC Report/La Razón	15 Feb	?	65.4	29.3; 125/136	22.8; 87/91	5.5; 6/9	3.8; 2/4	2.6; 11	0.8; 4	1.2; 6	2.0; 9	0.4; 1	0.4; 2	0.6; 2	3.3; 7	22.5; 71/74	–	6.5
JM&A/El Español	14 Feb	?	65.1	27.1; 121	19.6; 84	4.5; 5	3.5; 3	2.9; 11	1.0; 3	1.0; 5	2.3; 9	0.3; 0	0.4; 1	0.7; 2	4.0; 8	25.6; 96	–	1.5
Sigma Dos/Mediaset	9–12 Feb	1,800	?	29.6	20.1	4.1	1.8	2.6	–	1.2	2.4	–	–	–	7.3	25.8	–	3.8
MyWord/Cadena SER	9–11 Feb	1,000	?	22.5	19.5	3.0	3.3	–	–	–	–	–	–	–	13.4	24.6	–	2.1
Simple Lógica	2–9 Feb	1,058	71.0	26.8	17.8	3.4	3.6	3.0	–	1.0	–	–	–	–	8.5	29.6	–	2.8
Celeste-Tel/eldiario.es	2–6 Feb	1,100	59.4	31.8; 132/139	24.4; 90/93	4.5; 6/8	3.0; 3/4	2.2; 8/9	1.0; 5/6	1.0; 5/6	2.0; 8/9	0.7; 1/2	0.6; 2/3	0.6; 2	6.2; 10/11	18.3; 61/64	–	7.4
Demoscopia Servicios/esRadio	2–6 Feb	?	?	28.3; 133	21.8; 75	4.9; 9	3.9; 7	–	–	–	–	–	–	–	4.5; 10	25.3; 78	–	3.0
InvyMark/laSexta	2–6 Feb	1,200	?	26.1	20.1	4.3	5.0	2.9	–	1.2	3.1	–	–	–	3.8	26.0	–	0.1
Metroscopia/El País	3–4 Feb	1,000	72.0	20.9	18.3	6.5	4.5	–	–	–	–	–	–	–	12.2	27.7	–	6.8
Sigma Dos/Mediaset	26–29 Jan	1,000	?	27.1	21.4	4.8	4.0	2.5	–	–	2.4	–	–	–	5.0	26.3	–	0.8
Encuestamos	23 Jan	?	?	22.0	19.1	6.0	4.1	3.8	1.4	1.3	2.3	–	–	–	7.6	30.2	–	8.2
GAD3/ABC	9–16 Jan	1,000	76	29.3; 132	19.2; 80	3.7; 2	4.8; 5	2.8; 11	1.0; 3	1.3; 6	1.8; 8	–	–	1.4; 1	6.3; 11	21.1; 89	–	8.2
NC Report	7–15 Jan	?	?	29.3	23.0	5.4	–	–	–	–	–	–	–	–	3.8	23.2	–	6.1
Sigma Dos/Mediaset	12–14 Jan	1,800	?	29.4	19.4	4.7	4.1	2.7	–	1.1	2.7	–	–	–	4.6	26.2	–	3.2
Simple Lógica	7–14 Jan	1,025	68.6	24.5	18.6	4.6	6.4	2.3	–	0.4	–	–	–	–	5.8	30.8	–	6.3
CIS	2–12 Jan 2015	2,481	?	27.3	22.2	5.2	4.6	3.0	1.0	0.7	1.6	0.5	0.5	0.6	3.1	23.9	–	3.4
PP	9–10 Jan	?	?	28.0– 29.0	20.0– 21.0	–	–	–	–	–	–	–	–	–	–	24.0– 26.0	–	3.0– 4.0
Celeste-Tel/eldiario.es	2–9 Jan	1,100	60.2	31.1; 128/135	23.8; 89/92	4.7; 7/9	2.7; 3/4	2.1; 9/10	1.1; 6/7	1.0; 5/6	2.0; 9/10	0.6; 1/2	0.5; 2/3	0.6; 2	4.5; 9/10	20.9; 62/65	–	7.3
Metroscopia/El País	7–8 Jan	1,000	71.6	19.2	23.5	5.3	5.0	–	–	–	–	–	–	–	8.1	28.2	–	4.7
MyWord/Cadena SER	30 Dec–6 Jan	1,001	?	24.6	19.0	3.7	5.5	1.9	–	–	2.4	–	–	–	5.0	27.5	–	2.9

===== 2014 =====
Polling firm/Commissioner	Fieldwork date	Sample size	Turnout	PP	PSOE	IU–LV	UPyD	CiU	EH Bildu	PNV	ERC–CatSí	BNG	CC	Compromís	C's	Podemos	Lead
NC Report/La Razón	9–30 Dec	1,600	66.1	28.6; 113/120	23.4; 86/90	5.1; 6/10	3.9; 3/4	2.6; 11/12	0.8; 4	1.3; 6	2.0; 9/10	? 1	? 2	? 2	2.8; 4/7	23.2; 73/77	5.2
InvyMark/laSexta	15–19 Dec	1,200	?	25.5	22.0	4.5	5.2	2.9	–	1.2	3.1	–	–	–	3.1	25.3	0.2
Sigma Dos/Mediaset	12–18 Dec	1,800	?	26.5	18.7	5.3	4.4	2.8	–	1.1	2.8	–	–	–	3.1	28.7	2.2
GESOP/El Periódico	9–15 Dec	1,000	?	26.1; 115/118	19.8; 77/80	4.1; 2/4	6.5; 8/10	2.9; 9/10	–	–	2.2; 8/9	–	–	–	3.8; 3/5	25.6; 101/104	0.5
DYM/El Confidencial	13 Dec	?	?	26.1	16.7	5.6	5.9	–	–	–	–	–	–	–	4.2	29.6	3.5
Simple Lógica	1–10 Dec	1,039	?	23.1	19.3	5.5	5.4	0.9	–	0.3	–	–	–	–	–	31.1	8.0
Celeste-Tel/eldiario.es	1–5 Dec	1,100	60.7	29.9; 125/130	24.1; 89/94	4.9; 10/11	3.2; 5/6	2.0; 9/10	1.0; 6/7	1.0; 5/6	2.1; 9/10	0.6; 1/2	0.6; 2/3	0.7; 2/3	3.9; 8/10	21.7; 60/66	5.8
InvyMark/laSexta	1–5 Dec	?	?	25.7	21.8	4.6	5.5	3.0	–	–	3.1	–	–	–	2.7	24.8	0.9
Sigma Dos/Mediaset	2–4 Dec	1,000	?	26.5	19.6	4.8	4.4	2.6	–	1.0	2.6	–	–	–	2.4	29.1	2.6
Metroscopia/El País	2–3 Dec	1,000	73	20.0	27.7	5.6	4.8	–	–	–	–	–	–	–	–	25.0	2.7
Sigma Dos/El Mundo	17–19 Nov	1,000	?	26.3	20.1	4.2	4.5	3.0	1.0	1.1	2.8	–	–	–	2.5	28.3	2.0
JM&A	14 Nov	?	66.9	27.7; 123	22.0; 94	5.5; 10	4.0; 5	2.9; 12	1.0; 3	1.0; 4	2.6; 10	0.3; 0	0.4; 1	0.6; 1	2.6; 3	22.0; 80	5.7
InvyMark/laSexta	10–14 Nov	?	?	26.0	21.6	5.0	5.8	2.9	–	–	3.2	–	–	–	2.3	24.7	1.3
Simple Lógica	1–12 Nov	1,030	?	25.0	18.2	3.6	4.7	2.3	–	0.7	–	–	–	–	–	31.1	6.1
Celeste-Tel/eldiario.es	3–7 Nov	1,100	61.6	30.5; 127/131	24.5; 92/97	4.4; 11/12	3.2; 6/7	1.8; 8/9	1.0; 6/7	1.0; 5/6	2.2; 10/11	0.6; 1/2	0.6; 2/3	0.6; 2/3	4.0; 8/10	21.6; 57/61	6.0
DYM/El Confidencial	28 Oct–6 Nov	985	?	26.9	19.5	7.3	3.2	–	–	–	–	–	–	–	5.6	26.3	0.6
Llorente & Cuenca	31 Oct	?	?	25.1	22.6	8.7	7.8	–	–	–	–	–	–	–	–	19.5	2.5
InvyMark/laSexta	27–31 Oct	?	?	26.4	20.5	5.4	6.0	2.6	–	–	3.4	–	–	–	–	22.7	3.7
Metroscopia/El País	28–29 Oct	1,000	70.5	20.7	26.2	3.8	3.4	–	–	–	–	–	–	–	–	27.7	1.5
Asturbarómetro/ICNdiario	10–25 Oct	402	?	29.5	23.9	5.8	5.7	–	–	–	–	–	–	–	–	19.0	5.6
InvyMark/laSexta	13–17 Oct	?	?	28.2	21.4	6.9	6.2	2.7	–	1.2	3.4	–	–	–	–	18.6	6.8
Sigma Dos/Mediaset	13–16 Oct	1,100	?	28.3	23.7	5.2	3.7	2.5	–	1.2	2.6	–	–	–	1.8	24.1	3.7
CIS	1–13 Oct	2,480	?	27.5	23.9	4.8	4.1	3.8	0.9	1.0	2.3	0.4	0.3	1.1	2.1	22.5	3.6
Intercampo/GETS	15 Sep–12 Oct	1,724	60–70	20.0– 22.0	31.0– 34.0	6.0– 9.0	2.0– 3.0	1.0– 1.5	–	1.3– 1.6	2.5– 3.5	–	–	–	–	21.0– 24.0	10.0
Simple Lógica	3–10 Oct	?	?	29.7	24.6	3.5	4.2	1.3	–	1.1	–	–	–	–	–	23.3	5.1
JM&A	9 Oct	?	60.4	32.6; 147	21.6; 90	5.5; 9	5.4; 8	–	–	–	–	–	–	–	–	16.4; 54	11.0
Celeste-Tel/eldiario.es	1–7 Oct	1,100	61.7	32.6; 137/141	25.4; 90/98	5.4; 13/15	3.4; 6/8	2.3; 10/11	1.0; 6/7	1.0; 5/6	1.9; 8/9	0.6; 1/2	0.6; 2/3	0.7; 2/3	3.6; 7/9	17.1; 42/51	7.2
InvyMark/laSexta	29 Sep–3 Oct	?	?	28.6	20.9	7.1	6.1	2.8	–	1.2	3.3	–	–	–	–	17.9	7.7
Metroscopia/El País	29–30 Sep	1,000	70	30.2	30.9	5.2	3.4	–	–	–	–	–	–	–	–	13.8	0.7
Demoscopia Servicios/esRadio	22–26 Sep	?	?	32.7; 151	24.2; 89	5.2; 12	4.3; 8	? 9	? 6	? 6	? 8	–	–	–	3.1; 5	20.4; 48	4.0
InvyMark/laSexta	15–19 Sep	?	?	29.2	20.7	7.4	6.0	2.8	–	1.2	3.4	–	–	–	–	17.6	8.5
NC Report	8–12 Sep	955	?	34.2	23.3	5.8	4.4	–	–	–	–	–	–	–	–	16.5	10.9
Simple Lógica	5–12 Sep	?	?	32.8	20.0	5.5	5.7	1.7	–	1.0	–	–	–	–	–	23.1	9.7
Celeste-Tel	1–5 Sep	1,100	60.1	33.1; 142/149	24.5; 89/96	4.7; 11/14	4.0; 7/9	2.5; 10/11	1.1; 6/7	1.0; 5/6	2.0; 8/9	0.6; 1/2	0.6; 2/3	0.9; 2/3	3.7; 7/9	16.1; 36/44	8.6
NC Report/La Razón	25–30 Aug	900	61.3	33.9; 132/138	23.4; 89/93	5.6; 9/13	4.4; 7/10	2.8; 9/11	1.2; 6	1.3; 5	2.2; 8/10	0.6; 1/2	1.0; 2	0.9; 2	2.6; 4/6	15.0; 56/60	10.5
Sigma Dos/El Mundo	26–28 Aug	1,000	?	30.1	22.3	4.1	5.6	3.0	1.0	1.0	3.3	–	–	–	–	21.2	7.8
Simple Lógica	1–8 Aug	1,053	?	29.4	16.7	4.1	5.4	1.4	–	0.8	–	–	–	–	–	28.4	1.0
Celeste-Tel/eldiario.es	18–24 Jul	1,100	59.4	33.8; 143/151	24.1; 90/94	5.0; 11/15	4.7; 9/11	2.9; 12/13	1.1; 7/8	1.1; 5/6	1.8; 7/8	0.7; 1/2	0.6; 2/3	0.9; 2/3	3.7; 7/9	13.7; 32/37	9.7
Metroscopia/El País	16–24 Jul	1,200	71	32.3	31.7	4.9	3.3	–	–	–	–	–	–	–	–	10.7	0.6
InvyMark/laSexta	14–18 Jul	?	?	26.4	22.7	11.2	7.5	–	–	–	–	–	–	–	3.1	12.1	3.7
InvyMark/laSexta	7–11 Jul	?	?	26.5	22.4	11.3	7.3	–	–	–	–	–	–	–	3.0	11.8	4.1
CIS	1–9 Jul	2,471	?	30.0	21.2	8.2	5.9	2.9	1.0	1.0	3.3	0.5	0.3	1.4	0.9	15.3	8.8
Simple Lógica	1–8 Jul	1,112	?	29.0	15.1	6.2	7.9	1.1	–	1.6	–	–	–	–	–	27.1	1.9
Demoscopia Servicios/esRadio	5 Jul	?	?	30.0	26.0	7.0	7.0	–	–	–	–	–	–	–	–	12.0	4.0
Celeste-Tel/eldiario.es	1–5 Jul	1,100	58.8	33.5; 144/149	23.2; 89/92	5.1; 12/15	4.9; 9/12	3.0; 12/13	1.1; 7/8	1.1; 5/6	1.7; 6/7	0.6; 1/2	0.6; 2/3	0.8; 2/3	3.7; 6/8	14.1; 34/37	10.3
Simple Lógica	2–14 Jun	1,035	?	28.8	14.7	6.0	6.4	2.4	–	1.6	–	–	–	–	–	26.7	2.1
NC Report	28 May–11 Jun	955	?	34.6	21.9	6.1	5.3	–	–	–	–	–	–	–	–	16.3	12.7
Celeste-Tel/eldiario.es	4–6 Jun	1,100	57.9	32.4; 139/142	22.3; 94/98	5.6; 13/15	5.7; 12/14	3.0; 12/13	1.2; 7/8	1.1; 6/7	1.9; 7/8	0.6; 1/2	0.6; 2/3	0.9; 2/3	3.7; 5/6	13.9; 28/32	10.1
GESOP/El Periódico	27–31 May	1,000	?	25.6; 125/127	19.4; 87/89	8.1; 15/17	7.8; 13/14	3.4; 12/13	–	–	3.3; 11/12	–	–	–	3.5; 3/5	15.1; 56/58	6.2
2014 EP election	25 May	—N/a	43.8	26.1 (138)	23.0 (105)	10.0 (25)	6.5 (10)	3.5 (14)	1.4 (8)	1.4 (7)	3.8 (15)	0.5 (0)	0.4 (2)	0.9 (2)	3.2 (4)	8.0 (19)	3.1
Sigma Dos/El Mundo	13–15 May	1,111	?	33.8	25.7	10.3	6.2	–	–	–	–	–	–	–	2.9	3.1	8.1
Simple Lógica	2–10 May	?	?	30.9	22.9	12.4	12.3	2.7	–	1.8	–	–	–	–	–	–	8.0
Celeste-Tel	2–8 May	1,100	57.9	32.4; 138/147	29.0; 114/118	12.1; 25/27	7.3; 11/13	2.6; 11/12	1.4; 7	1.3; 6	1.8; 6/7	0.8; 2	0.8; 3/4	0.9; 3	2.0; 3/4	1.8; 1	3.4
Feedback/La Vanguardia	30 Apr–8 May	1,500	56.9	34.9; 144	27.1; 105	12.5; 38	9.2; 24	3.9; 13	1.5; 6	1.4; 5	2.4; 7	–	–	–	–	–	7.8
Sigma Dos/El Mundo	10–15 Apr	1,000	?	33.1	30.2	10.4	7.2	–	–	–	–	–	–	–	2.3	1.2	2.9
Simple Lógica	1–9 Apr	1,020	?	28.4	23.8	11.5	13.3	3.5	–	1.4	–	–	–	–	–	–	4.6
CIS	1–7 Apr	2,469	?	31.9	26.2	10.9	8.9	3.0	1.3	1.1	2.5	0.6	0.4	1.7	–	–	5.7
Celeste-Tel	1–5 Apr	1,100	57.5	32.3; 139/149	28.9; 115/118	12.5; 26/28	7.5; 12/14	2.7; 11/12	1.6; 7	1.4; 6	1.9; 6/7	0.9; 2/3	0.9; 3/4	1.0; 3	1.4; 3/4	–	3.4
Metroscopia/El País	25 Mar–1 Apr	1,200	65	31.8	32.3	11.7	6.8	–	–	–	–	–	–	–	–	–	0.5
NC Report	3–14 Mar	955	?	33.3	27.8	12.3	7.8	–	–	–	–	–	–	–	–	–	5.5
Simple Lógica	3–7 Mar	1,068	54.6	29.3	22.8	13.3	12.7	3.5	–	1.2	–	–	–	–	–	–	6.5
Celeste-Tel	1–6 Mar	1,100	56.9	32.0; 138/150	28.9; 115/118	12.8; 26/28	7.7; 12/14	2.6; 11/12	1.5; 7	1.4; 6	2.0; 6/7	1.0; 2	1.0; 3	1.0; 3	1.4; 2/4	–	3.1
Metroscopia/El País	25 Feb–4 Mar	1,200	65	31.5	32.0	12.0	7.0	–	–	–	–	–	–	–	–	–	0.5
NC Report/La Razón	28 Feb–1 Mar	630	58.7	32.6	26.7	12.1	9.4	3.3	1.3	1.6	2.3	0.7	1.3	1.0	–	–	5.9
InvyMark/laSexta	24–28 Feb	?	?	28.8	23.6	14.5	12.2	–	–	–	–	–	–	–	–	–	5.2
MyWord/Cadena SER	13–19 Feb	1,000	?	27.5	23.2	11.5	15.7	–	–	–	–	–	–	–	–	–	4.3
InvyMark/laSexta	10–14 Feb	?	?	28.9	23.2	–	–	–	–	–	–	–	–	–	–	–	5.7
GAD3/ABC	5–13 Feb	1,000	?	32.3; 148	26.3; 115	10.7; 21	10.1; 20	3.3; 12	1.3; 6	1.3; 6	2.1; 7	–	–	–	0.9; 1	–	6.0
Simple Lógica	3–10 Feb	1,119	?	29.6	20.3	14.9	11.8	3.8	–	1.0	–	–	–	–	–	–	9.3
Metroscopia/El País	5–6 Feb	1,200	65	30.8	31.7	13.5	8.5	–	–	–	–	–	–	–	–	–	0.9
Celeste-Tel/eldiario.es	1–6 Feb	1,100	56.6	31.6; 137/148	28.7; 114/118	13.1; 26/29	7.8; 12/14	2.4; 11/12	1.6; 8	1.2; 6	2.1; 7/8	0.9; 2	0.8; 3	1.1; 3	1.4; 2/4	–	2.9
InvyMark/laSexta	20–24 Jan	?	?	28.7	23.3	14.7	12.5	–	–	–	–	–	–	–	–	–	5.4
GESOP/El Periódico	20–23 Jan	1,000	?	28.6; 126/129	24.9; 104/107	13.2; 37/39	11.5; 30/32	3.3; 12/13	–	–	2.1; 7/8	–	–	–	4.1; 2/4	–	3.7
CIS	3–15 Jan	2,480	?	32.1	26.6	11.3	9.2	3.4	1.2	1.5	2.5	0.7	1.0	0.8	–	–	5.5
InvyMark/laSexta	7–10 Jan	?	?	28.5	23.4	14.7	12.7	–	–	–	–	–	–	–	–	–	5.1
Simple Lógica	2–10 Jan	1,030	?	28.1	22.0	14.8	13.0	2.6	–	1.9	–	–	–	–	–	–	6.1
Metroscopia/El País	8–9 Jan	1,200	65	32.0	33.5	12.5	7.3	–	–	–	–	–	–	–	–	–	1.5
Celeste-Tel/eldiario.es	2–7 Jan	1,100	56.3	32.1; 139/149	28.8; 114/118	13.2; 27/29	7.7; 12/14	2.3; 11	1.6; 8	1.3; 6	2.2; 8	0.9; 2	0.9; 3/4	1.1; 3	1.3; 2/3	–	3.3

===== 2013 =====
Polling firm/Commissioner	Fieldwork date	Sample size	Turnout	PP	PSOE	IU–LV	UPyD	CiU	EH Bildu	PNV	ERC–CatSí	BNG	CC	Compromís	C's	Lead
Sigma Dos/El Mundo	26–28 Dec	1,000	?	33.3	24.4	14.7	9.8	3.6	1.0	1.6	2.6	–	–	–	–	8.9
InvyMark/laSexta	16–20 Dec	?	?	28.2	23.6	14.6	12.7	–	–	–	–	–	–	–	–	4.6
Simple Lógica	2–10 Dec	1,044	?	30.7	22.8	14.1	13.6	2.8	–	1.5	–	–	–	–	–	7.9
Celeste-Tel/eldiario.es	1–5 Dec	1,100	55.4	32.0; 138/148	28.6; 114/118	13.1; 27/30	7.8; 12/14	2.3; 11	1.7; 8	1.3; 6	2.3; 8/9	0.9; 2	0.9; 4	1.1; 3	1.3; 2/3	3.4
Metroscopia/El País	30 Nov	12,000	65	33.9; 146	31.5; 131	12.0; 25	7.1; 11	2.8; 11	1.2; 5	1.5; 7	2.2; 8	0.6; 1	0.5; 2	0.6; 2	–	2.4
GESOP/El Periódico	25–28 Nov	1,000	?	29.5; 132/136	25.1; 104/108	12.9; 32/34	11.1; 28/29	3.0; 11/12	–	–	2.5; 8/9	–	–	–	4.0; 2/4	4.4
NC Report	18–28 Nov	955	?	34.2	28.4	12.2	7.4	–	–	–	–	–	–	–	–	5.8
InvyMark/laSexta	18–22 Nov	?	?	28.4	23.3	14.5	12.9	–	–	–	–	–	–	–	–	5.1
Sigma Dos/El Mundo	12–14 Nov	1,000	?	30.6	27.0	13.4	10.1	3.6	1.2	1.4	2.6	–	–	–	–	3.6
GAD3/Antena 3	11–14 Nov	801	?	33.1; 150	28.5; 122	9.2; 16	11.2; 21	3.6; 12	1.3; 6	1.3; 6	2.1; 7	–	–	–	–	7.4
Simple Lógica	4–13 Nov	1,959	?	30.9	21.7	12.2	14.8	2.3	–	1.6	–	–	–	–	–	9.2
InvyMark/laSexta	4–8 Nov	?	?	28.2	23.1	14.7	13.2	–	–	–	–	–	–	–	–	5.1
Celeste-Tel	2–7 Nov	1,100	55.1	31.8; 138/147	28.2; 113/117	13.3; 27/30	7.9; 12/14	2.3; 11	1.7; 8	1.4; 7	2.4; 8	0.9; 2	0.9; 4	1.2; 3	1.4; 3	3.6
MyWord/Cadena SER	30 Oct–4 Nov	1,000	?	27.1	22.7	13.5	15.6	–	–	–	–	–	–	–	–	4.4
DYM/El Confidencial	22–31 Oct	967	?	32.5	21.2	17.3	11.0	–	–	–	–	–	–	–	–	11.3
InvyMark/laSexta	14–18 Oct	?	?	27.2	23.4	14.8	13.3	–	–	–	–	–	–	–	–	3.8
Intercampo/GETS	16 Sep–14 Oct	1,726	High	28.3	34.8	12.7	6.8	2.3	–	1.6	2.2	–	–	–	–	6.5
Intercampo/GETS	16 Sep–14 Oct	1,726	Low	26.5	35.6	13.8	7.2	2.4	–	1.8	2.6	–	–	–	–	9.1
NC Report/La Razón	2–11 Oct	920	58.8	35.0; 150/154	26.9; 106/110	12.2; 26/28	7.8; 13/14	2.8; 12	1.6; 7	1.6; 6	2.2; 8	–	–	–	–	8.1
GAD3/Antena 3	7–10 Oct	805	?	33.2; 154	25.8; 109	13.3; 28	8.6; 16	3.0; 10	1.4; 7	1.4; 6	2.6; 8	–	–	–	–	7.4
CIS	1–9 Oct	2,485	?	34.0	26.8	11.3	7.7	2.9	1.2	1.2	2.5	1.1	0.5	0.5	–	7.2
Simple Lógica	1–7 Oct	1,001	51.0	27.5	21.6	12.6	13.8	3.0	–	1.6	–	–	–	–	–	5.9
Celeste-Tel	1–5 Oct	1,100	53.9	31.5; 137/143	28.1; 114/116	13.7; 28/31	8.0; 12/15	2.4; 11	1.6; 8	1.4; 7	2.3; 8	0.8; 2	0.9; 4	1.2; 3	1.3; 3	3.4
Metroscopia/El País	2–3 Oct	1,000	62	34.1	29.0	11.5	9.1	2.2	–	1.6	2.7	–	–	–	–	5.1
InvyMark/laSexta	23–27 Sep	?	?	26.0	23.5	14.8	13.2	–	–	–	–	–	–	–	–	2.5
NC Report	9–20 Sep	955	?	33.8	26.5	12.7	7.5	–	–	–	–	–	–	–	–	7.3
GAD3/Antena 3	10–13 Sep	935	?	32.4; 147	27.4; 118	12.8; 27	9.3; 17	3.1; 11	1.4; 7	1.4; 6	2.1; 7	–	–	–	–	5.0
InvyMark/laSexta	9–13 Sep	?	?	26.1	23.6	14.7	13.1	–	–	–	–	–	–	–	–	2.5
Simple Lógica	3–9 Sep	?	?	28.1	23.3	14.9	13.3	2.6	–	0.9	–	–	–	–	–	4.8
Celeste-Tel	2–6 Sep	1,100	52.3	30.9; 137/140	27.8; 114/115	14.2; 28/31	8.3; 13/16	2.6; 11	1.7; 8	1.5; 7	2.3; 8	0.8; 2	0.9; 4	1.3; 3	1.2; 3	3.1
Feedback/La Vanguardia	2–6 Sep	1,500	58.6	37.9; 153	25.2; 98	12.0; 37	9.6; 25	3.4; 13	1.4; 6	1.2; 5	2.1; 7	–	–	–	–	12.7
Metroscopia/El País	4–5 Sep	700	62	30.1	30.5	11.6	9.0	2.7	–	1.1	3.6	–	–	–	–	0.4
MyWord/Cadena SER	26–30 Aug	1,000	?	28.4	20.9	15.0	14.8	–	–	–	–	–	–	–	–	7.5
Simple Lógica	1–10 Aug	1,025	?	29.6	22.2	16.5	10.2	1.9	–	1.1	–	–	–	–	–	7.4
TNS Demoscopia	29–31 Jul	1,000	57	30.0	25.0	15.0	10.0	–	–	–	–	–	–	–	–	5.0
Celeste-Tel	26–31 Jul	1,100	50.8	31.3; 139/142	27.1; 114/115	14.0; 28/29	8.2; 13/14	2.6; 11	1.7; 8	1.5; 7	2.2; 8	0.7; 1/2	0.9; 4	1.3; 3	1.4; 3	4.2
Metroscopia/El País	24–25 Jul	1,000	65	34.7; 148	27.5; 127	11.4; 28	7.7; 12	–	–	–	–	–	–	–	–	7.2
Metroscopia/El País	24–25 Jul	1,000	52	23.0	22.8	16.2	11.8	2.5	–	1.1	3.5	–	–	–	–	0.2
Sigma Dos/El Mundo	16–18 Jul	1,000	?	30.7	27.8	14.3	8.3	4.2	1.1	1.4	1.6	–	–	–	–	2.9
CIS	1–10 Jul	2,476	?	32.5	27.2	11.5	8.8	3.1	1.4	1.4	2.3	0.7	0.5	0.9	–	5.3
Simple Lógica	1–9 Jul	1,012	?	25.8	24.2	14.7	12.3	3.4	–	1.5	–	–	–	–	–	1.6
Celeste-Tel	1–5 Jul	1,100	51.2	31.7; 138/144	27.0; 111/116	13.6; 26/28	8.0; 11/14	2.7; 11	1.6; 7	1.6; 7	2.2; 8	0.7; 1/2	0.9; 4	1.4; 3/4	1.4; 3/4	4.7
InvyMark/laSexta	1–5 Jul	?	?	29.1	24.5	–	–	–	–	–	–	–	–	–	–	4.6
Metroscopia/El País	3–4 Jul	1,000	52	23.0	21.6	16.6	13.0	–	–	–	–	–	–	–	–	1.4
GESOP/El Periódico	25–28 Jun	1,000	?	28.1; 118/122	25.5; 104/107	15.6; 48/50	12.2; 31/33	3.0; 11/12	–	–	2.1; 7/9	–	–	–	–	2.6
MyWord/Cadena SER	14–18 Jun	1,000	?	30.3	22.0	15.2	17.7	–	–	–	–	–	–	–	–	8.3
InvyMark/laSexta	10–14 Jun	?	?	28.9	24.4	–	–	–	–	–	–	–	–	–	–	4.5
Simple Lógica	3–11 Jun	1,018	?	31.9	21.2	12.9	10.6	3.7	–	1.3	–	–	–	–	–	10.7
Celeste-Tel	3–7 Jun	1,100	49.9	30.9; 136/144	26.5; 110/115	13.8; 26/28	8.4; 13/15	2.9; 12	1.5; 7	1.6; 7	2.1; 7	0.6; 1	0.9; 4	1.5; 3/4	1.6; 3/4	4.4
Metroscopia/El País	5–6 Jun	1,000	52	24.5	21.5	16.8	13.4	–	–	–	–	–	–	–	–	3.0
Asturbarómetro/El Comercio	5 May–3 Jun	403	?	39.7	25.6	14.3	8.6	–	–	–	–	–	–	–	–	14.1
GAD3/Antena 3	27–30 May	1,000	?	34.1; 155	25.7; 111	12.5; 26	9.7; 19	3.2; 10	–	–	–	–	–	–	–	8.4
NC Report	13–23 May	955	?	32.6	25.2	12.5	7.8	–	–	–	–	–	–	–	–	7.4
Metroscopia/El País	18 May	14,000	55	28.6; 139	25.1; 90	15.9; 48	10.7; 30	2.9; 10	1.5; 7	1.1; 5	2.7; 9	1.0; 5	0.8; 4	0.6; 2	–	3.5
Sigma Dos/El Mundo	8–10 May	1,000	?	35.4	25.3	13.4	9.6	4.3	1.0	1.4	1.5	–	–	–	–	10.1
InvyMark/laSexta	6–10 May	?	?	29.0	24.5	–	–	–	–	–	–	–	–	–	–	4.5
Simple Lógica	3–10 May	987	?	29.2	22.4	14.0	12.6	1.7	–	1.2	–	–	–	–	–	6.8
Metroscopia/El País	8–9 May	1,000	52	22.5	20.2	16.6	13.1	–	–	–	–	–	–	–	–	2.3
MyWord/Cadena SER	2–8 May	1,000	?	28.7	24.4	13.3	14.9	–	–	–	–	–	–	–	–	4.3
Celeste-Tel	2–7 May	1,100	46.6	30.5; 134/144	26.7; 110/116	14.0; 26/29	8.9; 13/16	3.0; 12	1.6; 7	1.5; 7	2.2; 7	0.5; 1	1.0; 4	1.6; 3/4	1.7; 3/4	3.8
InvyMark/laSexta	8–12 Apr	?	?	29.2	24.9	–	–	–	–	–	–	–	–	–	–	4.3
Simple Lógica	1–8 Apr	1,010	?	29.2	21.4	13.6	11.8	2.8	–	1.7	–	–	–	–	–	7.8
CIS	1–8 Apr	2,482	?	34.0	28.2	9.9	7.4	3.4	0.9	1.2	2.0	0.7	0.9	0.5	–	5.8
Celeste-Tel	1–5 Apr	1,100	44.1	30.4; 136/145	27.1; 112/118	13.9; 26/28	8.6; 13/15	3.2; 12	1.6; 7	1.5; 7	2.1; 6	0.5; 1	1.1; 4	1.7; 3/4	1.6; 3/4	3.3
Metroscopia/El País	3–4 Apr	1,000	53	24.5	23.0	15.6	13.7	–	–	–	–	–	–	–	–	1.5
InvyMark/laSexta	18–22 Mar	?	?	29.1	25.0	–	–	–	–	–	–	–	–	–	–	4.1
Simple Lógica	4–8 Mar	1,017	48.3	31.2	21.5	14.2	11.2	2.2	–	1.2	–	–	–	–	–	9.7
Celeste-Tel	1–6 Mar	1,100	44.3	29.4; 134/146	27.8; 114/120	13.8; 25/28	8.6; 13/16	3.4; 13	1.6; 7	1.5; 7	2.0; 5	0.6; 1	1.1; 4	1.8; 3/4	–	1.6
InvyMark/laSexta	25 Feb–1 Mar	?	?	29.0	25.0	–	–	–	–	–	–	–	–	–	–	4.0
Metroscopia/El País	27–28 Feb	1,000	53	24.3	23.1	15.4	10.0	–	–	–	–	–	–	–	–	1.2
InvyMark/laSexta	11–15 Feb	?	?	29.4	24.8	–	–	–	–	–	–	–	–	–	–	4.6
Sigma Dos/El Mundo	6–8 Feb	1,000	?	33.5	28.2	12.3	10.0	4.0	1.3	1.3	1.4	–	–	–	–	5.3
Simple Lógica	4–8 Feb	?	?	33.3	24.2	13.0	9.9	3.2	–	1.5	–	–	–	–	–	9.1
Celeste-Tel	1–6 Feb	1,100	49.2	29.8; 136/146	28.6; 117/121	12.8; 23/25	9.1; 14/17	3.7; 14	1.6; 7	1.6; 7	1.6; 4/5	0.6; 1	1.0; 3/4	1.8; 3/4	–	1.2
Metroscopia/El País	30 Jan–1 Feb	2,000	53	23.9	23.5	15.3	13.6	–	–	–	–	–	–	–	–	0.4
GESOP/El Periódico	25–29 Jan	1,000	?	30.2; 133/135	28.0; 120/123	12.3; 22/25	11.5; 23/26	3.0; 13/15	–	–	1.7; 6/7	–	–	–	–	2.2
InvyMark/laSexta	21–25 Jan	?	?	30.0	24.7	–	–	–	–	–	–	–	–	–	–	5.3
NC Report	10–21 Jan	955	?	36.5	26.3	11.8	7.7	–	–	–	–	–	–	–	–	10.2
CIS	4–14 Jan	2,483	?	35.0	30.2	9.4	6.8	3.6	0.9	1.3	2.0	0.8	0.9	1.1	–	4.8
InvyMark/laSexta	8–11 Jan	?	?	30.6	24.8	–	–	–	–	–	–	–	–	–	–	5.8
Simple Lógica	7–11 Jan	?	?	32.5	25.5	13.2	10.5	3.2	–	1.4	–	–	–	–	–	7.0
Metroscopia/El País	9–10 Jan	1,000	61	29.8	23.3	15.6	10.1	–	–	–	–	–	–	–	–	6.5
Celeste-Tel	2–9 Jan	1,100	58.9	32.8; 146/154	28.6; 113/117	12.0; 21/23	8.2; 10/13	3.8; 14/15	1.5; 7	1.6; 7	1.7; 5/6	0.7; 1/2	0.9; 3/4	1.6; 3	–	4.6

===== 2012 =====
Polling firm/Commissioner	Fieldwork date	Sample size	Turnout	PP	PSOE	IU–LV	UPyD	CiU	Amaiur EH Bildu	PNV	ERC–CatSí	BNG	CC	Compromís	Lead
Sigma Dos/El Mundo	21–28 Dec	1,000	?	36.7	30.7	9.8	7.1	4.0	1.3	1.2	1.2	–	–	–	6.0
InvyMark/laSexta	17–21 Dec	?	?	30.9	24.7	–	–	–	–	–	–	–	–	–	6.2
Celeste-Tel	3–12 Dec	1,100	58.4	33.1; 147/154	28.5; 112/117	11.8; 21/23	8.5; 11/13	3.6; 14/15	1.5; 7	1.5; 7	1.8; 5/6	0.7; 1/2	0.7; 3/4	1.6; 3	4.6
Simple Lógica	3–10 Dec	1,009	?	33.6	23.0	13.5	9.9	3.2	–	1.4	–	–	–	–	10.6
Metroscopia/El País	28–29 Nov	1,000	61	31.3	22.7	13.3	10.2	–	–	–	–	–	–	–	8.6
Celeste-Tel	5–9 Nov	1,100	58.4	33.6; 148/153	28.3; 112/115	12.0; 22/25	8.4; 11/13	3.6; 15	1.5; 7	1.7; 7	1.9; 6	0.7; 1/2	0.8; 4	1.4; 3	5.3
InvyMark/laSexta	5–9 Nov	?	?	32.0	26.0	–	–	–	–	–	–	–	–	–	6.0
Simple Lógica	1–8 Nov	1,025	?	34.5	24.3	13.4	10.1	3.8	–	1.0	–	–	–	–	10.2
Metroscopia/El País	6–7 Nov	1,000	61	31.8	22.9	12.9	8.5	–	–	–	–	–	–	–	8.9
MyWord/Cadena SER	26–31 Oct	1,000	?	33.0	22.3	9.4	11.9	–	–	–	–	–	–	–	10.7
InvyMark/laSexta	22–26 Oct	?	?	32.9	26.7	–	–	–	–	–	–	–	–	–	6.2
Intercampo/GETS	15 Sep–17 Oct	1,724	High	29.4	27.3	12.1	8.9	4.4	–	1.7	1.0	–	–	–	2.1
Intercampo/GETS	15 Sep–17 Oct	1,724	Low	32.6	30.1	11.8	7.8	4.3	–	1.7	1.0	–	–	–	2.5
CIS	2–14 Oct	2,484	?	35.9	28.6	9.4	7.3	3.9	1.6	1.4	1.3	0.7	0.4	0.7	7.3
Simple Lógica	1–11 Oct	?	?	34.1	24.5	11.6	9.1	3.9	–	1.8	–	–	–	–	9.6
Celeste-Tel	1–5 Oct	1,100	57.4	32.8; 148/151	28.0; 112/114	12.7; 24/26	9.0; 12/14	3.8; 16	1.6; 7	1.7; 7	1.5; 5	0.8; 2	0.8; 4	1.4; 3	4.8
Metroscopia/El País	3–4 Oct	1,000	60	29.9	23.9	12.6	10.2	–	–	–	–	–	–	–	6.0
NC Report	25–30 Sep	?	?	38.6	26.7	–	–	–	–	–	–	–	–	–	11.9
InvyMark/laSexta	17–21 Sep	?	?	34.1	29.9	–	–	–	–	–	–	–	–	–	4.2
Simple Lógica	3–13 Sep	1,776	52.8	34.7	26.0	10.7	8.6	2.5	–	1.0	–	–	–	–	8.7
MyWord/Cadena SER	7–12 Sep	1,100	?	31.1	24.8	11.3	13.0	–	–	–	–	–	–	–	6.3
Celeste-Tel	3–7 Sep	1,100	59.9	34.0; 150/153	29.9; 119/121	10.8; 20/21	8.6; 12/13	4.0; 15	1.6; 7	1.6; 6	1.2; 4	0.8; 2	0.8; 3/4	1.7; 3/4	4.1
Metroscopia/El País	5–6 Sep	1,000	60	30.9	24.1	12.4	9.8	–	–	–	–	–	–	–	6.8
Simple Lógica	1–10 Aug	2,009	?	36.4	24.7	11.0	9.5	3.4	–	0.7	–	–	–	–	11.7
NC Report	26–31 Jul	955	?	35.9	28.3	–	–	–	–	–	–	–	–	–	7.6
Celeste-Tel	23–27 Jul	1,100	60.3	34.2; 152/154	29.5; 118/121	10.7; 19/20	8.7; 12/13	4.3; 15	1.5; 7	1.7; 6	1.3; 4/5	1.1; 2/3	0.6; 2/3	1.9; 3/4	4.7
Metroscopia/El País	25–26 Jul	1,000	59	30.0	24.7	12.3	9.9	–	–	–	–	–	–	–	5.3
Sigma Dos/El Mundo	17–19 Jul	1,000	?	35.8	29.6	11.7	7.8	4.1	1.3	1.4	1.1	–	–	–	6.2
Simple Lógica	2–10 Jul	1,006	?	37.2	27.7	10.2	9.3	3.7	–	0.6	–	–	–	–	9.5
CIS	2–10 Jul	2,484	?	36.6	29.9	8.6	6.6	4.0	1.2	1.5	1.3	0.7	0.7	0.8	6.7
Celeste-Tel	2–6 Jul	1,100	62.8	40.6; 164/168	29.4; 117/125	10.2; 19/20	5.1; 5/7	4.2; 15	1.5; 6	1.6; 7	1.1; 3/5	1.2; 3	0.7; 2/3	1.0; 1/3	11.2
InvyMark/laSexta	2–6 Jul	?	?	40.5	31.8	–	–	–	–	–	–	–	–	–	8.7
Metroscopia/El País	4–5 Jul	1,000	65	37.0	23.1	13.2	7.8	–	–	–	–	–	–	–	13.9
DYM/ABC	27–28 Jun	857	?	36.8	23.1	13.9	7.5	4.3	–	1.8	–	–	–	–	13.7
GESOP/El Periódico	14–18 Jun	1,000	?	38.1; 168/172	28.1; 109/112	10.2; 19/20	7.5; 11/12	3.7; 15/16	1.1; 5/6	1.5; 6/7	1.0; 2/3	–	–	–	10.0
PP	16 Jun	?	?	38.0– 39.0	29.0– 29.5	9.0– 9.5	7.5– 8.0	–	–	–	–	–	–	–	9.0– 9.5
Simple Lógica	1–15 Jun	1,017	?	39.2	24.4	10.7	6.8	2.5	–	1.7	–	–	–	–	14.8
Sigma Dos/El Mundo	12–14 Jun	1,000	?	39.1	29.2	9.3	6.8	4.4	1.4	1.4	1.2	–	–	–	9.9
Metroscopia/El País	6–7 Jun	1,004	65	37.1	25.9	12.0	5.9	–	–	–	–	–	–	–	11.2
Celeste-Tel	1–7 Jun	1,100	63.2	40.8; 164/170	29.3; 118/125	10.4; 20/22	5.1; 5/8	4.0; 15	1.4; 7	1.5; 7	0.9; 3/5	1.1; 3	0.6; 2	1.0; 1/3	11.5
NC Report	21–30 May	955	?	42.7	27.9	–	–	–	–	–	–	–	–	–	14.8
Simple Lógica	1–11 May	1,015	64.2	39.9	27.1	10.6	6.5	2.7	–	0.9	–	–	–	–	12.8
Metroscopia/El País	9–10 May	1,001	65	37.2	25.8	12.2	6.1	–	–	–	–	–	–	–	11.4
Celeste-Tel	2–8 May	1,100	64.8	41.1; 166/170	28.8; 117/123	10.5; 20/21	5.1; 5/7	3.7; 14	1.5; 6	1.6; 7	1.0; 3/4	1.2; 3	0.7; 2	0.8; 1/2	12.3
PSOE	25 Apr	?	?	39.8	31.0	–	–	–	–	–	–	–	–	–	8.8
CIS	9–17 Apr	2,484	?	40.6	29.6	8.6	5.1	3.8	1.3	1.2	1.7	0.3	0.3	0.8	11.0
Metroscopia/El País	11–12 Apr	1,000	65	38.1	23.0	11.6	5.9	–	–	–	–	–	–	–	15.1
Simple Lógica	1–11 Apr	1,026	?	42.0	24.9	10.5	6.5	3.8	–	1.1	–	–	–	–	17.1
Celeste-Tel	2–9 Apr	1,100	65.6	41.3; 168/171	28.9; 118/121	10.2; 18/20	5.3; 5/7	3.9; 15	1.4; 6	1.5; 7	1.2; 3/4	1.0; 3	0.7; 2	0.6; 1	12.4
Celeste-Tel	1–7 Mar	1,100	67.2	45.1; 186/188	26.1; 102/104	9.5; 14/15	5.7; 5/8	4.1; 16	1.3; 6	1.4; 7	1.2; 3/4	1.0; 3	0.6; 2	0.6; 1	19.0
Metroscopia/El País	29 Feb–1 Mar	1,007	71.7	46.3	24.4	9.1	5.1	–	–	–	–	–	–	–	21.9
GESOP/El Periódico	23–28 Feb	1,000	?	42.0; 179/181	28.2; 110/112	7.7; 13/14	6.4; 9/10	3.6; 14/15	1.8; 7	1.2; 5	1.2; 3/4	–	–	–	13.8
NC Report/La Razón	1–17 Feb	4,800	63.8	45.6; 186/187	25.6; 104/108	8.8; 12/13	5.5; 6/7	4.1; 15/16	1.5; 7	1.4; 5	1.1; 3	0.8; 2	0.6; 2/3	0.6; 1/2	20.0
Metroscopia/El País	8–9 Feb	1,003	71.7	46.2	23.0	8.8	6.3	–	–	–	–	–	–	–	23.2
Celeste-Tel	1–7 Feb	1,100	67.8	44.6; 184/185	27.4; 105/107	9.1; 14/15	5.4; 5/7	4.1; 15	1.4; 6/7	1.4; 6	1.2; 3/4	1.0; 3	0.6; 2	0.7; 1/2	17.2
NC Report/La Razón	16–20 Jan	1,000	68.2	46.3; 191/193	27.8; 103/105	7.4; 11/12	5.1; 5	4.2; 15/16	1.3; 7	1.4; 5	1.1; 3	0.8; 2	0.6; 2	0.5; 1	18.5
CIS	4–15 Jan	2,480	?	42.7	28.0	7.9	5.7	3.4	1.1	1.4	1.4	0.5	0.4	0.8	14.7
Celeste-Tel	2–6 Jan	1,100	69.1	46.1; 189/190	28.8; 107/108	7.6; 12	5.2; 5	4.0; 15	1.3; 6	1.4; 6	1.1; 3	0.8; 2	0.6; 2	0.5; 1/2	17.3
Metroscopia/El País	4–5 Jan	1,000	71.7	46.4	26.5	7.7	4.6	–	–	–	–	–	–	–	19.9

===== 2011 =====
Polling firm/Commissioner	Fieldwork date	Sample size	Turnout	PP	PSOE	IU–LV	UPyD	CiU	Amaiur	PNV	ERC–CatSí	BNG	CC	Compromís	Lead
Metroscopia/El País	14–15 Dec	1,000	71.7	44.9	28.4	7.0	4.7	–	–	–	–	–	–	–	16.5
2011 general election	20 Nov	—N/a	68.9	44.6; 186	28.8; 110	6.9; 11	4.7; 5	4.2; 16	1.4; 7	1.3; 5	1.1; 3	0.8; 2	0.6; 2	0.5; 1	15.8

==== Voting preferences ====
The table below lists raw, unweighted voting preferences.

Color key:

Poll conducted after legal ban on opinion polls

Polling firm/Commissioner	Fieldwork date	Sample size	PP	PSOE	IU–UPeC	UPYD	CiU	Amaiur EH Bildu	PNV	ERC–CatSí	BNG	CC	Compromís	C's	Podemos	CDC DiL	Question	X mark	Lead
2015 general election (Note: Does not include non-resident citizens.)	20 Dec 2015	—N/a	20.8	16.0	2.7	0.4	–	0.6	0.9	1.7	0.2	0.2		10.1	15.0	1.6	—N/a	26.8	4.8
GESOP/El Periòdic	17–19 Dec 2015	950	17.7	13.3	4.0	0.3	–	–	–	3.2	–	–		9.2	16.0	–	–	–	1.7
GESOP/El Periòdic	16–18 Dec 2015	800	18.8	14.6	–	–	–	–	–	–	–	–		–	15.1	–	–	–	3.7
GESOP/El Periòdic	15–17 Dec 2015	750	17.2	15.5	–	–	–	–	–	–	–	–		–	15.5	–	–	–	1.7
GESOP/El Periòdic	14–16 Dec 2015	700	17.9	16.1	–	–	–	–	–	–	–	–		9.3	14.9	–	–	–	1.8
GESOP/El Periòdic	13–15 Dec 2015	650	16.5	15.1	–	–	–	–	–	–	–	–		9.5	13.4	–	–	–	1.4
GESOP/El Periòdic	12–14 Dec 2015	700	17.3	15.0	–	–	–	–	–	–	–	–		9.8	15.3	–	–	–	2.0
Demoscopia Servicios/esRadio	7–11 Dec 2015	1,500	19.3	13.6	1.7	–	–	–	–	–	–	–		13.5	13.4	–	20.3	10.5	5.7
Simple Lógica	1–11 Dec 2015	1,005	13.6	9.1	3.5	0.3	–	–	0.3	–	–	–		10.7	10.0	0.7	36.6	10.3	2.9
GAD3/ABC	16 Nov–11 Dec 2015	7,300	22.7	18.5	4.1	0.3	–	0.7	1.0	2.2	0.2	0.3		16.0	12.9	2.2	–	–	4.2
Metroscopia/El País	7–10 Dec 2015	2,800	17.0	12.8	3.2	–	–	–	–	–	–	–		11.8	13.6	–	35.2		3.4
MyWord/Cadena SER	3–9 Dec 2015	1,500	11.8	8.9	4.3	0.8	–	0.3	0.6	3.3	0.3	0.1		12.3	14.0	1.0	32.4	4.6	1.7
DYM/El Confidencial	27 Nov–9 Dec 2015	1,012	11.8	9.6	–	–	–	–	–	–	–	–		12.0	12.3	–	–	–	0.3
Sondaxe/La Voz de Galicia	30 Nov–4 Dec 2015	1,000	17.8	16.3	–	–	–	–	–	–	–	–		12.0	–	–	24.6	–	1.5
GAD3/ABC	10 Nov–3 Dec 2015	5,700	22.6	18.5	4.1	0.2	–	0.6	1.1	2.3	0.2	0.3		16.1	13.3	2.2	–	–	4.1
GESOP/El Periódico	23–28 Nov 2015	1,816	18.1	17.0	4.0	0.8	–	0.3	0.5	2.1	0.1	0.2		16.0	13.3	1.3	20.6	3.0	1.1
Demoscopia Servicios/esRadio	23–26 Nov 2015	1,500	16.5	13.9	3.0	–	–	–	–	–	–	–		12.5	10.4	–	23.3	13.4	2.6
GAD3/ABC	2–26 Nov 2015	4,300	23.0	18.6	4.1	0.3	–	0.7	1.0	2.4	0.2	0.3		15.7	12.6	2.1	–	–	4.4
Metroscopia/El País	23–25 Nov 2015	1,200	14.6	14.4	3.7	–	–	–	–	–	–	–		16.2	11.3	–	32.0		1.6
Simple Lógica	2–16 Nov 2015	1,746	14.8	13.2	2.9	0.4	–	–	0.3	–	–	–		14.1	12.6	0.9	24.0	12.0	0.7
CIS	27 Oct–16 Nov 2015	17,452	16.2	14.9	2.6	0.2	–	0.7	0.7	1.7	0.1	0.1		11.6	11.8	1.2	25.2	8.0	1.3
IBES/Última Hora	8 Nov 2015	2,508	21.9	18.2	4.2	0.1	–	0.6	0.9	3.3	0.2	0.1		15.4	13.4	2.2	9.5	6.6	3.7
Demoscopia Servicios/esRadio	29 Oct–6 Nov 2015	1,800	17.1	14.6	3.7	–	–	–	–	–	–	–	–	11.0	8.3	–	24.2	13.7	2.5
Metroscopia/El País	26–28 Oct 2015	1,400	15.4	12.1	4.3	–	–	–	–	–	–	–	–	13.9	10.9	–	35.4		1.5
MyWord/Cadena SER	22–26 Oct 2015	1,001	12.0	9.9	3.2	0.8	–	0.3	0.6	3.7	0.4	0.1	1.2	14.6	15.5	1.2	26.4	4.3	0.9
DYM/El Confidencial	15–26 Oct 2015	1,002	11.7	10.0	–	–	–	–	–	–	–	–	–	10.7	8.8	–	–	–	1.0
CIS	1–12 Oct 2015	2,493	15.0	16.6	3.1	0.4	–	0.7	0.5	1.9	0.2	0.3	0.8	11.0	8.8	1.2	24.9	9.7	1.6
Simple Lógica	1–9 Oct 2015	1,047	14.2	11.8	4.0	0.3	–	–	0.1	–	–	–	–	13.3	7.1	0.5	25.4	18.0	0.9
Metroscopia/El País	7–8 Oct 2015	1,200	15.1	13.6	3.4	–	–	–	–	–	–	–	–	13.7	8.3	–	37.9		1.4
Demoscopia Servicios/esRadio	29 Sep–2 Oct 2015	1,000	18.3	15.2	3.1	–	–	–	–	–	–	–	–	7.3	9.6	–	23.7	15.9	3.1
Metroscopia/El País	7–11 Sep 2015	1,800	15.4	16.8	3.2	–	–	–	–	–	–	–	–	11.2	12.7	–	31.2		1.4
Demoscopia Servicios/esRadio	3–11 Sep 2015	1,800	20.8	13.7	2.8	–	–	–	–	–	–	–	–	7.3	11.9	–	22.6	14.1	7.1
MyWord/Cadena SER	20–27 Aug 2015	1,001	13.8	12.2	3.2	1.2	–	0.3	0.7	3.2	0.2	0.4	1.5	11.0	14.9	1.8	22.4	5.5	1.1
Simple Lógica	3–11 Aug 2015	1,022	15.2	13.3	4.4	0.6	0.3	–	0.6	–	–	–	–	9.4	11.9	–	21.9	18.0	1.9
Metroscopia/El País	20–22 Jul 2015	1,000	15.0	16.0	3.5	–	–	–	–	–	–	–	–	10.4	11.1	–	34.2		1.0
CIS	1–9 Jul 2015	2,486	16.0	17.3	2.9	0.4	1.9	0.6	1.0	1.6	0.3	0.2	0.7	7.7	12.6	–	20.3	11.1	1.3
Simple Lógica	1–9 Jul 2015	1,040	13.6	16.0	4.3	0.3	0.7	–	0.5	–	–	–	–	10.5	10.6	–	16.0	20.1	2.4
Metroscopia/El País	1–2 Jul 2015	1,000	15.5	14.0	2.5	0.5	–	–	–	–	–	–	–	10.7	14.9	–	31.4		0.6
Metroscopia/El País	28 May–2 Jun 2015	2,000	16.0	14.4	2.2	0.2	1.6	0.2	0.6	1.8	0.1	–	0.4	6.1	14.2	–	32.7	5.8	1.6
MyWord/Cadena SER	17–22 Apr 2015	1,000	11.1	8.4	3.4	1.5	0.9	0.5	0.4	3.3	0.2	0.4	0.9	17.8	17.7	–	19.4	5.9	0.1
GESOP/El Periódico	8–13 Apr 2015	1,000	14.0	14.5	3.9	1.1	2.3	0.3	0.4	1.2	0.2	0.1	0.5	15.7	18.9	–	12.8	5.1	3.2
Simple Lógica	1–13 Apr 2015	1,059	10.4	12.7	2.4	0.6	0.9	–	0.1	–	–	–	–	11.7	12.7	–	23.3	21.6	Tie
CIS	1–12 Apr 2015	2,479	13.5	15.4	3.1	0.8	1.4	0.4	0.6	1.5	0.2	0.2	0.4	10.0	13.6	–	22.6	10.9	1.9
Metroscopia/El País	7–9 Apr 2015	1,000	14.6	15.1	3.5	1.3	1.4	0.2	0.6	1.6	0.1	0.2	0.2	12.5	15.3	–	25.5	4.6	0.2
Intercampo/GETS	13–29 Mar 2015	2,024	13.0	18.1	3.3	0.9	1.4	–	0.5	1.1	–	–	–	7.8	16.3	–	35.0		1.8
Simple Lógica	2–13 Mar 2015	1,058	11.1	10.2	3.7	1.7	0.9	–	0.7	–	–	–	–	11.3	13.6	–	23.4	18.9	2.3
MyWord/Cadena SER	4–9 Mar 2015	1,000	7.2	7.7	3.5	1.7	1.7	0.2	0.4	3.1	0.3	0.1	0.7	15.0	22.7	–	19.9	7.1	7.7
Metroscopia/El País	3–4 Mar 2015	1,000	12.8	11.6	4.4	1.9	1.0	0.5	0.4	1.5	0.2	–	–	11.0	17.0	–	26.5	5.0	4.2
MyWord/Cadena SER	9–11 Feb 2015	1,000	12.2	9.1	3.6	3.4	2.4	0.4	0.9	2.6	0.5	0.3	1.0	10.5	23.5	–	16.1	4.5	11.3
Simple Lógica	2–9 Feb 2015	1,058	13.9	10.1	3.0	2.6	1.0	–	0.6	–	–	–	–	5.3	20.0	–	18.5	20.2	6.1
Metroscopia/El País	3–4 Feb 2015	1,000	12.3	11.4	4.0	2.1	0.9	0.2	0.8	1.0	0.1	0.1	0.2	6.6	20.5	–	27.4	6.0	8.2
GAD3/ABC	9–16 Jan 2015	1,000	19.5	12.6	2.4	3.2	1.8	0.3	1.2	1.1	–	–	0.9	5.2	13.7	–	–	–	5.8
Simple Lógica	7–14 Jan 2015	1,025	11.5	9.5	3.4	3.7	1.2	–	0.2	–	–	–	–	3.5	20.7	–	19.1	22.7	9.2
CIS	2–12 Jan 2015	2,481	12.9	12.4	3.6	2.2	1.7	0.6	0.6	1.3	0.2	0.2	0.3	2.1	19.3	–	22.0	13.6	6.4
Metroscopia/El País	7–8 Jan 2015	1,000	12.8	12.3	4.4	3.3	1.5	0.3	0.2	1.8	0.2	0.2	0.4	4.6	20.4	–	25.6	7.9	7.6
MyWord/Cadena SER	30 Dec–6 Jan 2015	1,001	9.8	10.1	4.0	4.5	1.7	0.4	0.2	3.5	0.8	0.4	–	4.9	24.0	–	18.4	7.8	14.1
GESOP/El Periódico	9–15 Dec 2014	1,000	15.9	13.6	3.6	4.5	0.8	0.2	0.8	2.3	0.4	0.1	0.2	3.2	24.4	–	13.6	6.5	8.5
DYM/El Confidencial	13 Dec 2014	?	7.8	7.2	–	–	–	–	–	–	–	–	–	2.9	16.9	–	28.4	14.4	9.1
Metroscopia/El País	2–3 Dec 2014	1,000	12.1	16.5	4.1	3.5	–	–	–	–	–	–	–	–	18.1	–	31.6		1.6
DYM/El Confidencial	28 Oct–6 Nov 2014	985	7.4	8.9	–	–	–	–	–	–	–	–	–	–	16.6	–	–	–	7.7
Metroscopia/El País	28–29 Oct 2014	1,000	10.4	13.1	3.7	3.0	–	–	–	–	–	–	–	–	22.2	–	36.7		9.1
CIS	1–13 Oct 2014	2,480	11.7	14.3	3.7	2.1	2.0	0.4	0.4	1.9	0.1	0.1	0.3	1.5	17.6	–	21.9	15.7	3.3
Intercampo/GETS	15 Sep–12 Oct 2014	1,724	12.8	18.8	5.3	1.5	0.8	–	0.8	2.0	–	–	–	–	14.8	–	40.0		4.0
Metroscopia/El País	29–30 Sep 2014	1,000	11.9	14.8	4.9	3.2	–	–	–	–	–	–	–	–	12.3	–	40.0		2.5
Metroscopia/El País	16–24 Jul 2014	1,200	14.5	14.4	3.0	2.0	–	–	–	–	–	–	–	–	13.4	–	42.3		0.1
CIS	1–9 Jul 2014	2,471	12.8	10.6	6.2	3.5	1.5	0.6	0.6	2.5	0.2	0.0	0.8	0.6	11.9	–	20.8	19.2	0.9
GESOP/El Periódico	27–31 May 2014	1,000	15.1	8.3	6.1	4.8	2.3	0.5	0.4	3.5	–	0.1	0.6	2.6	16.7	–	18.9	9.3	1.6
2014 EP election	25 May 2014	—N/a	11.7	10.4	4.5	2.9	1.6	0.6	0.6	1.8	0.2	0.2	0.4	1.4	3.6	–	—N/a	54.2	1.3
CIS	1–7 Apr 2014	2,469	13.6	13.4	7.2	4.9	1.4	0.8	0.6	1.9	0.2	0.2	0.9	–	–	–	22.9	20.2	0.2
Metroscopia/El País	25 Mar–1 Apr 2014	1,200	13.6	13.0	9.5	5.5	1.2	0.3	0.4	2.3	–	0.2	0.1	–	–	–	28.4	14.5	0.6
Simple Lógica	3–7 Mar 2014	1,068	11.5	11.1	8.1	6.6	1.4	–	0.6	–	–	–	–	–	–	–	18.6	32.2	0.4
Metroscopia/El País	25 Feb–4 Mar 2014	1,200	14.1	13.7	10.9	6.9	1.8	0.2	0.8	2.4	0.3	0.4	0.3	–	–	–	22.2	14.7	0.4
MyWord/Cadena SER	13–19 Feb 2014	1,000	7.0	9.1	8.3	10.9	2.5	0.4	0.3	3.6	0.9	0.9	2.7	–	–	–	21.7	9.6	1.8
Metroscopia/El País	5–6 Feb 2014	1,200	12.6	12.4	11.9	5.5	1.6	0.2	0.8	1.7	0.2	0.6	0.4	–	–	–	24.1	16.8	0.2
GESOP/El Periódico	20–23 Jan 2014	1,000	15.7	14.6	9.5	8.0	2.2	0.8	0.5	1.6	0.4	0.2	0.3	2.3	–	–	16.8	14.7	1.1
CIS	3–15 Jan 2014	2,480	10.8	11.8	7.1	4.6	1.4	0.5	0.6	1.7	0.3	0.4	0.6	–	–	–	23.6	24.2	1.0
Metroscopia/El País	8–9 Jan 2014	1,200	12.5	12.9	9.9	4.1	1.3	0.4	0.6	1.4	0.1	0.2	0.6	–	–	–	23.9	19.4	0.4
GESOP/El Periódico	25–28 Nov 2013	1,000	16.1	17.3	9.3	7.2	1.5	0.7	0.5	2.7	0.3	0.4	0.2	2.7	–	–	15.6	11.4	1.2
GAD3/Antena 3	11–14 Nov 2013	801	22.9	22.1	7.1	7.9	2.5	–	–	–	–	–	–	–	–	–	–	–	0.8
MyWord/Cadena SER	30 Oct–4 Nov 2013	1,000	7.1	9.1	11.0	10.8	1.5	0.8	0.4	3.8	0.7	0.2	2.4	–	–	–	21.6	11.5	0.2
DYM/El Confidencial	22–31 Oct 2013	967	7.5	8.7	–	–	–	–	–	–	–	–	–	–	–	–	–	–	1.2
GAD3/Antena 3	7–10 Oct 2013	805	19.6	17.0	12.6	8.5	1.9	–	–	–	–	–	–	–	–	–	–	–	2.6
CIS	1–9 Oct 2013	2,485	11.4	13.0	8.5	4.8	1.1	0.6	0.5	2.0	0.2	0.4	0.4	–	–	–	24.1	22.0	1.6
Simple Lógica	1–7 Oct 2013	1,001	10.1	9.1	6.1	7.0	1.2	–	0.5	–	–	–	–	–	–	–	19.5	37.2	1.0
Metroscopia/El País	2–3 Oct 2013	1,000	14.1	9.6	9.5	7.4	1.2	0.2	1.1	1.5	0.2	0.2	0.5	–	–	–	26.3	13.6	4.5
GAD3/Antena 3	10–13 Sep 2013	935	18.3	16.0	7.5	6.1	1.7	–	–	–	–	–	–	–	–	–	–	–	2.3
Metroscopia/El País	4–5 Sep 2013	700	11.1	12.3	10.4	7.3	1.7	0.7	0.4	1.9	0.3	0.3	0.6	–	–	–	24.2	16.4	1.2
MyWord/Cadena SER	26–30 Aug 2013	1,000	8.6	8.3	11.6	8.5	–	–	–	–	–	–	–	–	–	–	25.7	11.0	3.0
Metroscopia/El País	24–25 Jul 2013	1,000	11.6	10.3	9.8	6.3	–	–	–	–	–	–	–	–	–	–	16.5	29.2	1.3
CIS	1–10 Jul 2013	2,476	13.2	12.5	7.8	4.9	1.1	0.5	0.8	1.6	0.3	0.2	0.8	–	–	–	21.9	24.0	0.7
Metroscopia/El País	3–4 Jul 2013	1,000	10.0	10.4	9.5	6.7	1.7	0.5	0.4	1.6	0.4	–	0.6	–	–	–	18.8	26.0	0.4
GESOP/El Periódico	25–28 Jun 2013	1,000	15.5	17.2	11.5	8.2	1.4	0.6	0.6	1.6	0.3	0.1	0.4	0.7	–	–	15.6	13.2	1.7
MyWord/Cadena SER	14–18 Jun 2013	1,000	7.5	7.5	13.2	10.7	–	–	–	–	–	–	–	–	–	–	22.8	12.6	2.5
Metroscopia/El País	5–6 Jun 2013	1,000	13.7	10.2	10.0	8.0	1.4	0.6	0.5	1.3	0.2	–	0.4	–	–	–	17.6	25.8	3.5
GAD3/Antena 3	27–30 May 2013	1,000	18.7	13.1	10.6	6.3	1.2	–	–	–	–	–	–	–	–	–	–	–	5.6
Metroscopia/El País	8–9 May 2013	1,000	11.3	7.8	9.5	5.8	1.3	0.5	0.3	1.3	0.7	0.1	0.2	–	–	–	22.8	25.0	1.8
MyWord/Cadena SER	2–8 May 2013	1,000	7.8	11.7	11.1	9.7	–	–	–	–	–	–	–	–	–	–	17.3	13.3	0.6
CIS	1–8 Apr 2013	2,482	12.5	13.7	7.1	4.1	1.2	0.3	0.8	1.6	0.2	0.2	0.6	–	–	–	21.5	22.7	1.2
Metroscopia/El País	3–4 Apr 2013	1,000	13.4	8.8	10.7	6.7	1.2	0.3	0.8	1.1	0.3	0.2	0.3	–	–	–	18.0	27.3	2.7
Simple Lógica	4–8 Mar 2013	1,017	10.0	8.3	6.6	4.8	0.4	–	0.1	–	–	–	–	–	–	–	22.4	40.2	1.7
Metroscopia/El País	27–28 Feb 2013	1,000	13.6	10.5	8.6	5.7	–	–	–	–	–	–	–	–	–	–	16.8	25.5	3.1
Metroscopia/El País	30 Jan–1 Feb 2013	2,000	12.0	12.4	7.8	6.9	–	–	–	–	–	–	–	–	–	–	19.5	24.6	0.4
GESOP/El Periódico	25–29 Jan 2013	1,000	13.6	20.8	10.1	7.1	1.8	0.5	0.7	2.1	0.5	0.1	0.6	–	–	–	13.8	12.4	7.2
CIS	4–14 Jan 2013	2,483	15.8	17.0	6.4	3.8	1.7	0.4	0.8	1.9	0.3	0.2	0.8	–	–	–	19.7	21.5	1.2
Metroscopia/El País	9–10 Jan 2013	1,000	13.9	11.3	9.8	5.9	–	–	–	–	–	–	–	–	–	–	17.0	24.7	2.6
Metroscopia/El País	6–7 Nov 2012	1,000	16.7	13.3	8.1	5.0	–	–	–	–	–	–	–	–	–	–	15.6	24.8	3.4
MyWord/Cadena SER	26–31 Oct 2012	1,000	12.2	10.7	8.4	9.2	–	–	–	–	–	–	–	–	–	–	22.3	10.2	1.5
CIS	2–14 Oct 2012	2,484	16.1	17.6	7.0	4.4	2.3	0.8	0.8	1.1	0.2	0.3	0.5	–	–	–	20.1	18.8	1.5
Simple Lógica	3–13 Sep 2012	1,776	14.6	11.1	5.3	4.0	0.8	–	0.6	–	–	–	–	–	–	–	21.9	33.5	3.5
CIS	2–10 Jul 2012	2,484	18.2	17.1	6.2	3.5	2.1	0.9	0.6	0.8	0.2	0.3	0.8	–	–	–	18.7	22.3	1.1
DYM/ABC	27–28 Jun 2012	857	17.4	10.9	–	–	–	–	–	–	–	–	–	–	–	–	–	–	6.5
GESOP/El Periódico	14–18 Jun 2012	1,000	24.8	22.3	9.5	6.8	3.2	0.8	1.0	0.8	0.8	0.2	0.3	–	–	–	11.9	7.4	2.5
Simple Lógica	1–11 May 2012	1,015	17.8	15.8	8.1	3.7	1.4	–	0.6	–	–	–	–	–	–	–	17.2	26.1	2.0
CIS	9–17 Apr 2012	2,484	24.0	20.8	7.0	2.8	1.9	0.7	1.0	1.0	0.1	0.2	0.4	–	–	–	15.6	17.2	3.2
GESOP/El Periódico	23–28 Feb 2012	1,000	33.0	24.0	7.1	5.0	2.5	1.2	0.6	0.9	0.4	0.1	0.3	–	–	–	10.1	6.4	9.0
Metroscopia/El País	8–9 Feb 2012	1,003	32.5	14.4	7.4	5.5	–	–	–	–	–	–	–	–	–	–	15.9	13.3	18.1
CIS	4–15 Jan 2012	2,480	30.5	18.2	5.9	3.8	2.2	0.7	0.9	0.7	0.2	0.2	0.8	–	–	–	16.6	13.4	12.3
2011 general election	20 Nov 2011	—N/a	31.6	20.3	4.9	3.3	3.0	1.0	0.9	0.7	0.5	0.4	0.4	–	–	–	—N/a	28.3	11.3

==== Victory preference ====
The table below lists opinion polling on the victory preferences for each party in the event of a general election taking place.

Polling firm/Commissioner	Fieldwork date	Sample size	PP	PSOE	IU–UPeC	UPYD	CiU	Amaiur EH Bildu	PNV	ERC–CatSí	C's	Podemos	CDC DiL	Other/ None	Question	Lead
Metroscopia/El País	7–10 Dec 2015	2,800	20.0	19.0	–	–	–	–	–	–	16.0	17.0	–	–	–	8.8
CIS	27 Oct–16 Nov 2015	17,452	18.0	18.9	3.5	0.3	–	0.3	0.4	1.2	13.6	13.1	0.9	10.6	19.2	0.9
Metroscopia/El País	26–28 Oct 2015	1,400	18.0	18.0	–	–	–	–	–	–	18.0	14.0	–	18.0	14.0	Tie
CIS	1–9 Jul 2015	2,486	18.9	22.2	3.2	0.3	1.3	0.2	0.4	1.0	8.3	15.7	–	3.6	24.8	3.3
Intercampo/GETS	15 Sep–12 Oct 2014	1,724	13.9	25.3	5.2	1.7	0.3	–	0.3	0.6	0.9	16.5	–	14.3	21.0	8.8
Intercampo/GETS	16 Sep–14 Oct 2013	1,726	14.4	25.6	8.6	3.7	1.1	–	0.4	0.9	–	–	–	20.3	25.0	11.2
Intercampo/GETS	15 Sep–17 Oct 2012	1,724	16.6	27.1	7.6	4.2	0.7	–	0.6	0.3	–	–	–	19.4	23.5	10.5
Metroscopia/El País	3–4 Oct 2012	1,000	28.0	37.0	–	–	–	–	–	–	–	–	–	24.0	11.0	9.0

==== Victory likelihood ====
The table below lists opinion polling on the perceived likelihood of victory for each party in the event of a general election taking place.

Polling firm/Commissioner	Fieldwork date	Sample size	PP	PSOE	C's	Podemos	Other/ None	Question	Lead
GAD3/ABC	16 Nov–11 Dec 2015	7,300	59.4	12.3	10.8	4.1	13.4		47.1
GAD3/ABC	10 Nov–3 Dec 2015	5,700	58.1	13.0	11.4	4.1	13.4		45.1
GESOP/El Periódico	23–28 Nov 2015	1,816	61.7	11.0	7.3	1.7	0.2	18.1	50.7
GAD3/ABC	2–26 Nov 2015	4,300	56.3	15.0	9.9	4.9	13.9		41.3
GAD3/ABC	26 Oct–19 Nov 2015	3,000	54.9	16.2	10.0	5.0	13.9		38.7
CIS	27 Oct–16 Nov 2015	17,452	52.4	13.5	4.9	2.0	2.4	24.8	38.9
GAD3/ABC	19 Oct–12 Nov 2015	3,100	53.2	17.5	9.6	5.8	13.9		35.7
GAD3/ABC	14 Oct–4 Nov 2015	3,300	51.5	18.3	9.4	6.2	14.6		33.2
GAD3/ABC	14–29 Oct 2015	2,800	49.0	18.1	9.6	5.5	17.8		30.9
GAD3/ABC	14 Sep–19 Oct 2015	2,600	48.2	17.7	6.8	6.0	21.3		30.5
CIS	1–9 Jul 2015	2,486	40.1	22.2	1.6	6.9	0.6	28.7	17.9
GAD3/ABC	23 Jun–8 Jul 2015	1,000	43.7	26.6	4.7	15.5	9.5		17.1
Encuestamos	2–20 Apr 2015	1,000	41.3	29.6	–	18.9	10.2		11.7
GESOP/El Periódico	8–13 Apr 2015	1,000	44.7	17.4	2.1	10.7	0.1	25.0	27.3
Encuestamos	26 Mar 2015	900	34.3	30.6	–	28.2	6.9		3.7
Encuestamos	26 Feb 2015	600	32.1	11.2	–	33.3	23.4		1.2
Encuestamos	23 Jan 2015	?	26.5	9.1	–	45.5	18.9		19.0
GAD3/ABC	9–16 Jan 2015	1,000	32.2	10.4	–	25.7	6.2	25.5	6.5
GESOP/El Periódico	9–15 Dec 2014	1,000	29.8	16.7	0.5	26.9	1.3	24.8	2.9
Intercampo/GETS	15 Sep–12 Oct 2014	1,724	39.6	20.3	–	5.9	2.7	31.5	19.3
GAD3/Antena 3	11–14 Nov 2013	801	48.5	20.8	–	–	30.7		27.7
Intercampo/GETS	16 Sep–14 Oct 2013	1,726	30.5	23.9	–	–	6.8	38.8	6.6
GAD3/Antena 3	7–10 Oct 2013	805	43.5	17.6	–	–	20.4	18.6	25.9
GAD3/Antena 3	10–13 Sep 2013	935	36.0	19.4	–	–	22.3	22.3	16.6
GAD3/Antena 3	27–30 May 2013	1,000	39.0	16.4	–	–	20.4	24.2	22.6
Intercampo/GETS	15 Sep–17 Oct 2012	1,724	29.1	23.8	–	–	7.7	39.4	5.3
