= Azpa =

- Council
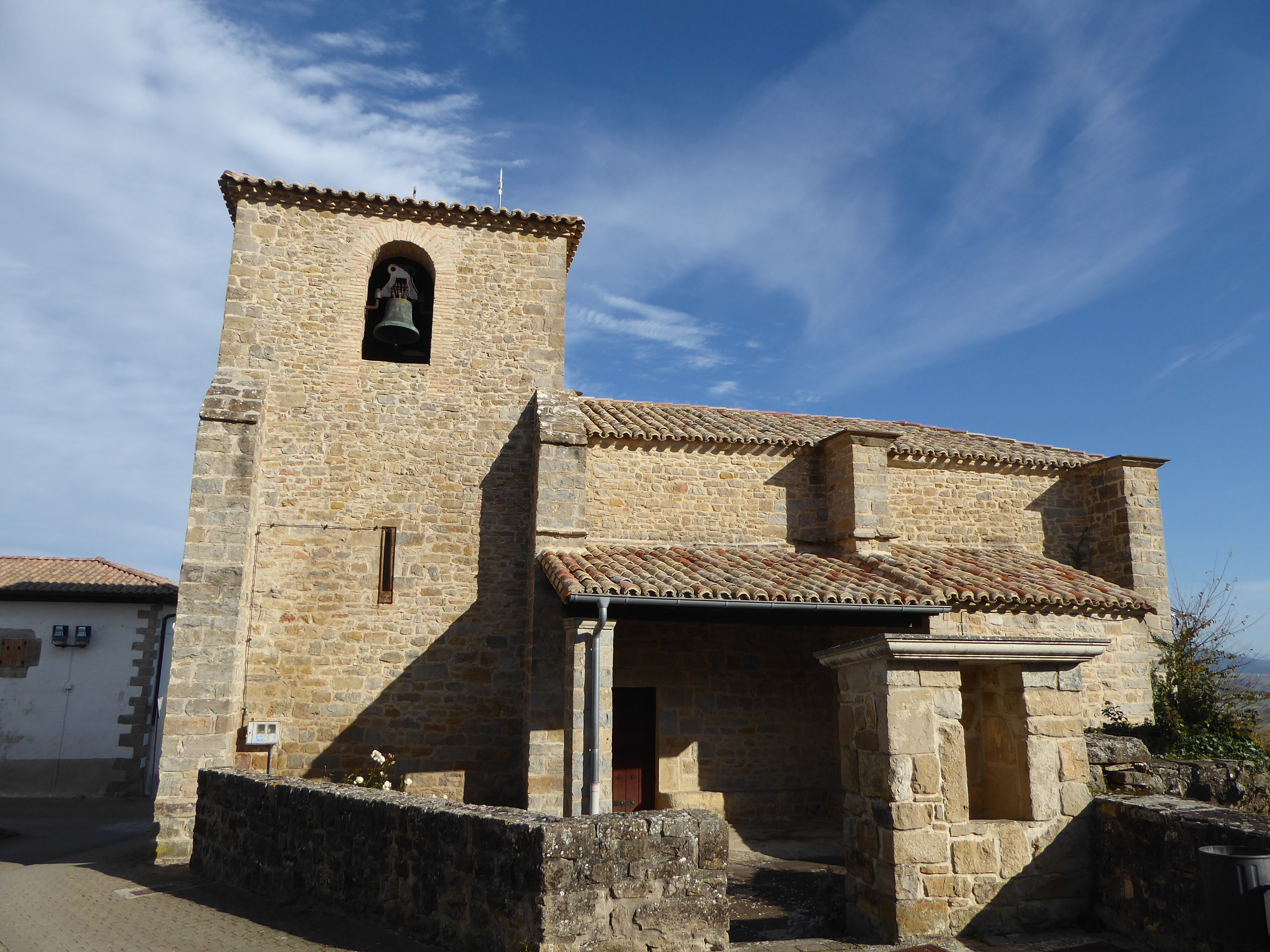

- Location within Navarre Location within Spain
- Coordinates: 42°48′21″N 1°31′19″W
- Country: Spain
- Community: Navarre
- Province: Navarre
- Municipality: Valle de Egüés
- Elevation: 619 m (2,031 ft)

Population
  - Total: 21

Azpa is a locality and council located in the municipality of Valle de Egüés, in Navarre province, Spain, Spain. As of 2020, it has a population of 21. Azpa is linked to the Viscountcy of Azpa.

== Geography ==
Azpa is annexed to the municipality of Egüés, judicial district of Aoiz, Navarre. It is located to the east of Pamplona and at the eastern end of the Egüés valley at the foot of a hill. It is bordered to the north by Eransus and Ibiricu, to the south by Laquidain, to the east by Uroz, and to the west by Ardanaz. It is 4.6 kilometers from Egüés, to the southeast of which it is located, and 14 kilometers from Pamplona.
