= Arantzazu Ametzaga =

Basque writer and librarian

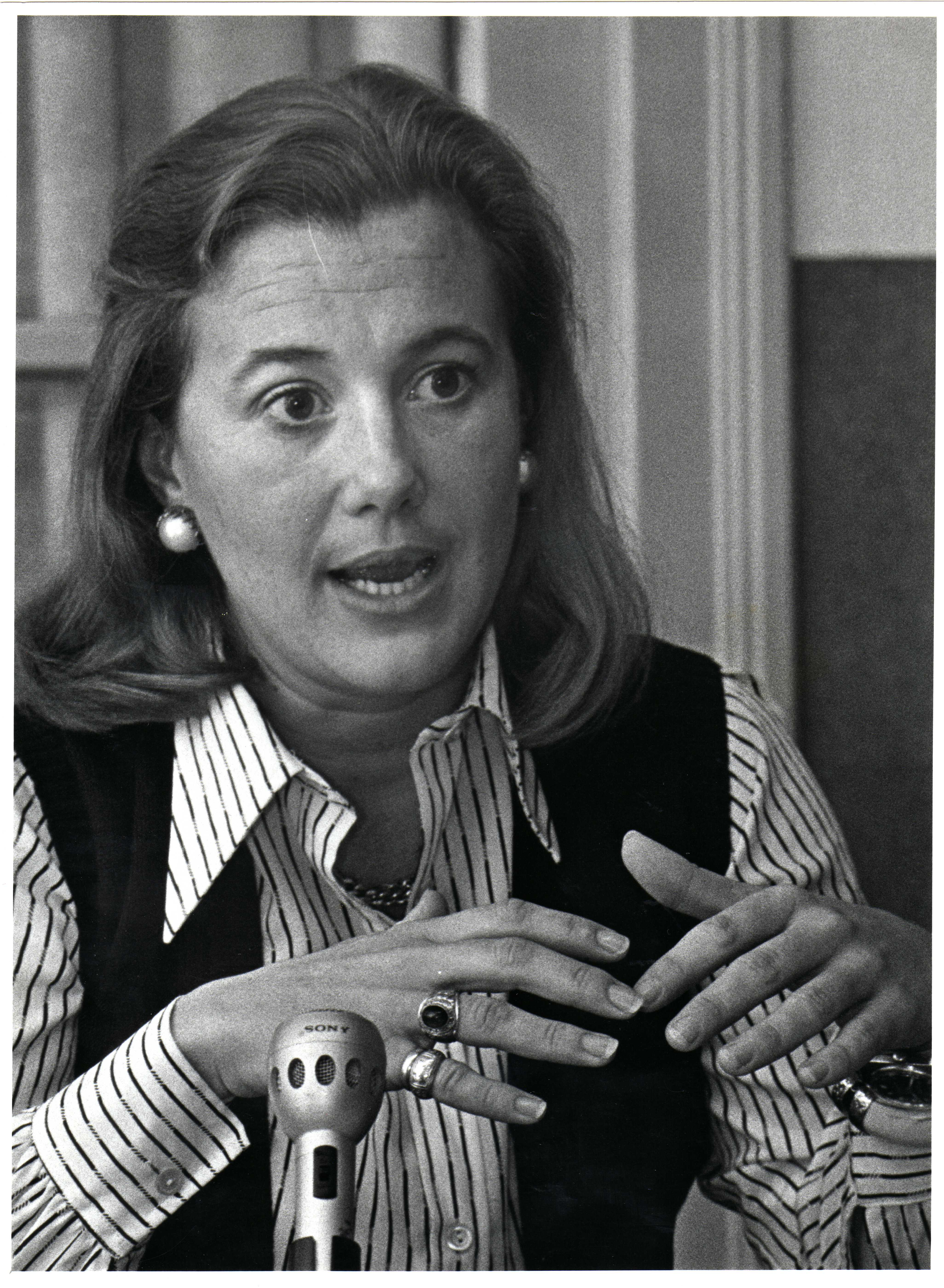
- Ametzaga in 1982
- Born: Arantzazu Ametzaga Iribarren; 21 January 1943 (age 83); Buenos Aires, Argentina
- Education: Central University of Venezuela
- Occupations: Librarian, writer, historian
- Spouse: Pello Irujo Elizalde (1939–2008)
- Children: Four sons
- Writing career
- Notable awards: Sabino Arana Award (2015); Manuel Irujo Award (2016); Nabarralde makila (2017)

Arantzazu Ametzaga (born 21 January 1943) is a Basque writer, librarian and historian. She was the founder of the library of the Basque Parliament.

== Early life and education ==
Arantzazu Ametzaga Iribarren was born on 21 January 1943 in Buenos Aires, Argentina. Her father, Bingen Ametzaga Aresti, a Basque writer and politician, and her mother, Mercedes Iribarren Gorostegi, a member of a well-known Basque business family, moved to Argentina during the Spanish Civil War, leaving from Marseille in 1941. When she was nine months old, her family moved to Montevideo, Uruguay, where she spent her childhood. Due to the economic and political crisis in Uruguay, they moved to Caracas, Venezuela in 1955.

Ametzaga studied librarianship at the Central University of Venezuela and graduated with a degree in library and archive studies in 1962 and a degree in library science in 1965. In order to pay for her undergraduate studies, she worked in the archives of Electricidad de Caracas from 1960 to 1962. While earning her advanced degree she worked at the U.S. Embassy in Caracas, implementing the Alliance for Progress (ALPRO) programme established by President John F. Kennedy, which assisted the creation of libraries and the distribution of books within South America. In 1968, she worked at the INVESTI (Institute for Technological Research) at the Central University of Venezuela and, after her father's death in 1969, she began working at the Boulton Foundation in Caracas as an archivist and librarian, staying there until 1972. At the time she was in Caracas there were a large number of other Basque emigrants there and she was an active member of the Basque Centre, also collaborating with the Basque radio station in Venezuela, Radio Euzkadi.

== Return to Spain ==
Ametzaga married Pello Irujo Elizalde (1939 –2008) in Caracas in 1965, and their first three children, Xabier, Pello and Mikel, were born in Caracas. They returned to Spain in 1972, to live in Pamplona in the Navarre autonomous community, where their fourth son, Enekoitz, was born. She became the founder and librarian of the Bolivarian Association of the Basque Country. In 1979 she was asked to be the godmother of the Venezuelan school ship Simón Bolívar which was built in Bilbao in 1979–80.

Ametzaga was the founder of the library of the Basque Parliament and was its main librarian between 1980 and 1985. The library began operating in January 1982 as a centre for bibliographic documentation and archives on issues discussed in Parliament. Ametzaga divided the library into two different physical areas: the legal field with reference books and an area devoted to the Basque national bibliography. In June 1982, the library received the Juan Ramón Urquijo collection, with many valuable books on Basque culture and old books published in Basque. By 1984, the library already had 11,000 books, which were available to lawmakers, although Ametzaga also wanted to open it to researchers. After obtaining the Urquijo collection, Ametzaga directed the publication of six bibliographic catalogues of the library, a milestone in the history of bibliography in the Basque Country.

Although making a major contribution to the Basque culture, Ametzaga had not learned the Basque language when in South America. Her father spoke eight languages and translated many classics of world literature into Basque, but her mother never learned Basque. On returning to Spain and the Basque country, Ametzaga studied and is now able to understand and read Basque. Her four sons speak Basque.

== Political action ==
In the first years of the transition in Spain after the death of the dictator, Francisco Franco, Ametzaga was very active in politics. After leaving active politics in 1985 she started giving speeches again in 1998. From 2007 to 2011 she was a councillor in the Valle de Egüés, representing the Nafarroa Bai group, a coalition of Basque nationalists and left-wing parties, and from 2015 to 2019 she was a member of the Alzuza Council.

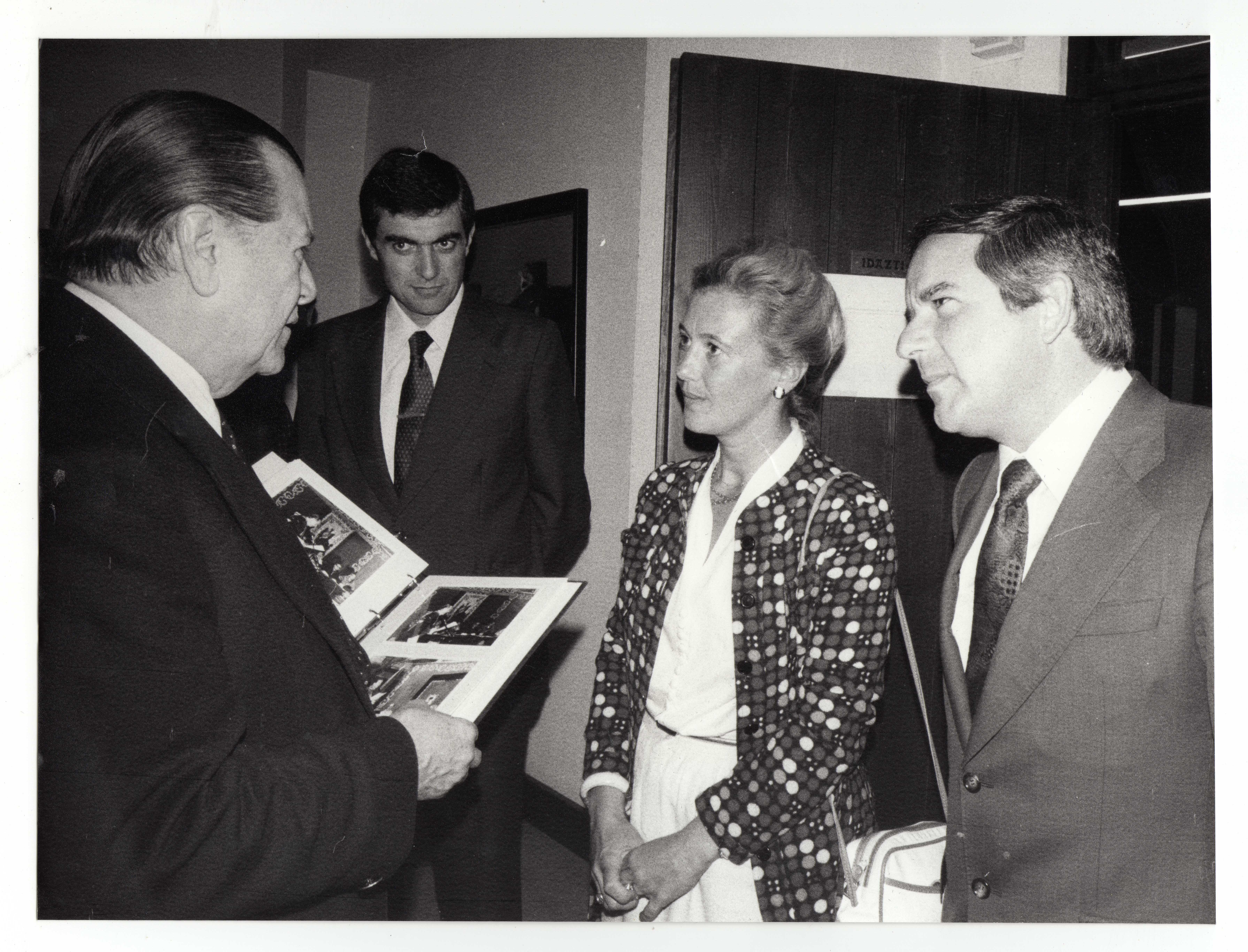
Arantzazu Ametzaga with Pello Irujo and Rafael Caldera, President of Venezuela

== Writing ==
Works by Ametzaga include:

- 1972. Chispas de felicidad (Sparks of happiness). Caracas: Tales for children. OCLC 253436085.
- 1981. La Mujer Vasca (The Basque Woman). Bilbao: Geu. ISBN 978-8485328116.
- 1981. Crónicas del Alsina (Chronicles of Alsina. Passengers of freedom. Bilbao: Writing Action). ISBN 978-9505152421.
- 1980-1985. Seis catálogos bibliográficos del parlamento vasco (Six bibliographic catalogs of the Basque parliament). Vitoria-Gasteiz: Basque Parliament.
- 1985. Bustiñaga. Bilbao, Writing Action. ISBN 978-8475470344.
- 1993. Vicente Amezaga. Nostalgia. Selected texts. Vitoria-Gasteiz: Basque Government, 2 vols. ISBN 978-8480460118.
- 1999. Manuel Irujo. Un hombre vasco (Manuel Irujo. A Basque man). Bilbao: Sabino Arana Foundation. ISBN 978-8488379429.
- 2000. Veinticinco Cartas para una Guerra (Twenty-Five Letters to a War). Donostia: Ttarttalo. ISBN 84-8091-681-8.
- 2003. Rebelión contra la Guipuzcoana (Rebellion against the Guipuzcoan). Donostia, Ttarttalo, 2003. ISBN 978-8480918602.
- 2004. Vademecum. Donostia: Ttarttalo. ISBN 978-8480919302.
- 2006. Paraquaria. Donostia: Ttarttalo. ISBN 978-8498430028.
- 2008. Niebla de batallas (Fog of battles). Donostia: Ttarttalo. ISBN 978-8498435092.
- 2009. La Txalupa de Radio Euzkadi. Semblanza de Pello Irujo. Vitoria-Gasteiz: Basque Government. ISBN 978-8445728758.
- 2009. Memorias de Montevideo (Memoirs of Montevideo). Donostia: Saturraran. ISBN 978-8461339631.
- 2011. El Manuscrito de Carlomagno (The Manuscript of Charlemagne). Madrid: PR Ediciones. ISBN 978-8415092483.
- 2013. 1512. La conquista de un reino (1512. The conquest of a kingdom). Madrid: Libros en Red, 2013. ISBN 978-1597549141.
- 2015. 778. Orreaga: El nacimiento de un reino (778. Orreaga: The birth of a kingdom). San Sebastián: Vaccine. ISBN 978-8471485601.
- 2016. Contraviaje: De Nueva York a Gernika pasando por Berlín (Contraband: From New York to Guernica via Berlin). Buenos Aires: Ekin. ISBN 9780996781008.
- 2016. Pólvora y Azafrán (Gunpowder and Saffron). San Sebastián: Vaccine. ISBN 978-8471485694.
- 2018. Irujo. Una familia vasca (Irujo. A Basque family). Donostia: Elkar. ISBN 978-8409066582.
- 2018. Maria Ana Bidegaray. Montevideo: Library of the Basque Country. ISBN 978-1727846249.

In addition, she has written more than 500 articles in various media, both in Caracas and on her return from exile. She has been a regular contributor to Diario de Noticias de Navarra and to Navarralde, Jazoera and Eusko Kultura and also writes for online papers in Uruguay and Argentina.

== Awards ==
- Sabino Arana Award (2015)
- Manuel Irujo Award (2016)
- Nabarralde makila (The Nabarralde Stick) (2017)
