= 2011 Spanish local elections in Navarre =

This article presents the results breakdown of the local elections held in Navarre on 22 May 2011. The following tables show detailed results in the autonomous community's most populous municipalities, sorted alphabetically.

== City control ==
The following table lists party control in the most populous municipalities, including provincial capitals (shown in bold). Gains for a party are displayed with the cell's background shaded in that party's colour.

Municipality	Population	Previous control	New control
Barañain	21,705	Navarrese People's Union (UPN)	Navarrese People's Union (UPN)
Burlada	18,389	Socialist Party of Navarre (PSN–PSOE)	Navarrese People's Union (UPN)
Egüés	14,354	Navarrese People's Union (UPN)	Navarrese People's Union (UPN) (GBai in 2013)
Estella	14,207	Navarrese People's Union (UPN)	Navarrese People's Union (UPN)
**Pamplona**	197,488	Navarrese People's Union (UPN)	Navarrese People's Union (UPN)
Tafalla	11,413	Navarrese People's Union (UPN)	Navarrese People's Union (UPN)
Tudela	35,268	Navarrese People's Union (UPN)	Navarrese People's Union (UPN)

== Municipalities ==
=== Barañain ===
Population: 21,705

← Summary of the 22 May 2011 City Council of Barañain election results →
Parties and alliances	Popular vote			Seats	
Parties and alliances	Votes	%	±pp	Total	+/−
Navarrese People's Union (UPN)	2,868	28.63	−10.58	**7**	−3
Navarre Yes 2011 (NaBai 2011)	1,794	17.91	−8.62	**4**	−2
Socialist Party of Navarre (PSN–PSOE)	1,581	15.78	−3.48	**4**	±0
Gather–Basque Solidarity–Alternative (Bildu–EA–Alternatiba)	1,534	15.32	New	**3**	+3
Left (I–E (n))^{1}	913	9.12	+1.96	**2**	+1
People's Party (PP)	669	6.68	New	**1**	+1
Convergence of Democrats of Navarre (CDN)	214	2.14	−0.80	0	±0
Navarrese and Spanish Right (DNE)	94	0.94	New	0	±0
Blank ballots	349	3.48	+1.40		
**Total**	**10,016**			**21**	**±0**
Valid votes	10,016	98.56	+3.75		
Invalid votes	146	1.44	−3.75		
**Votes cast / turnout**	**10,162**	**65.29**	**−5.00**		
Abstentions	5,402	34.71	+5.00		
**Registered voters**	**15,564**				
Sources
Footnotes: ^{1} Left results are compared to United Left of Navarre totals in the 2007 election.

=== Burlada ===
Population: 18,389

← Summary of the 22 May 2011 City Council of Burlada election results →
Parties and alliances	Popular vote			Seats	
Parties and alliances	Votes	%	±pp	Total	+/−
Navarrese People's Union–Independents of Burlada (UPN–UIB)	1,759	22.32	−2.58	**4**	−1
Socialist Party of Navarre (PSN–PSOE)	1,618	20.53	−3.95	**4**	±0
Gather–Basque Solidarity–Alternative (Bildu–EA–Alternatiba)^{1}	1,548	19.64	+8.07	**4**	+2
Navarre Yes 2011 (NaBai 2011)	1,346	17.08	−6.25	**3**	−1
People's Party (PP)	663	8.41	New	**1**	+1
Left (I–E (n))^{2}	585	7.42	+2.16	**1**	±0
Convergence of Democrats of Navarre (CDN)	128	1.62	−7.12	0	−1
Blank ballots	234	2.97	+1.26		
**Total**	**7,881**			**17**	**±0**
Valid votes	7,881	98.78	−0.70		
Invalid votes	97	1.22	+0.70		
**Votes cast / turnout**	**7,978**	**61.51**	**−5.02**		
Abstentions	4,992	38.49	+5.02		
**Registered voters**	**12,970**				
Sources
Footnotes: ^{1} Gather–Basque Solidarity–Alternative results are compared to Basque Nationalist Action totals in the 2007 election.; ^{2} Left results are compared to United Left of Navarre totals in the 2007 election.

=== Egüés ===
Population: 14,354

← Summary of the 22 May 2011 City Council of Egüés election results →
Parties and alliances	Popular vote			Seats	
Parties and alliances	Votes	%	±pp	Total	+/−
Navarrese People's Union (UPN)	2,406	31.18	−20.15	6	−3
Navarre Yes 2011 (NaBai 2011)	1,716	22.24	+0.83	4	+1
Gather–Basque Solidarity–Alternative (Bildu–EA–Alternatiba)^{1}	1,030	13.35	+8.45	2	+2
Socialist Party of Navarre (PSN–PSOE)	824	10.68	+0.46	2	+1
Left (I–E (n))^{2}	766	9.93	+4.98	2	+2
People's Party (PP)	656	8.50	New	1	+1
Blank ballots	318	4.12	+1.83		
**Total**	**7,716**			17	**+4**
Valid votes	7,716	98.51	−1.02		
Invalid votes	117	1.49	+1.02		
**Votes cast / turnout**	**7,833**	**70.30**	**−6.38**		
Abstentions	3,310	29.70	+6.38		
**Registered voters**	**11,143**				
Sources
Footnotes: ^{1} Gather–Basque Solidarity–Alternative results are compared to Basque Nationalist Action totals in the 2007 election.; ^{2} Left results are compared to United Left of Navarre totals in the 2007 election.

=== Estella ===
Population: 14,207

← Summary of the 22 May 2011 City Council of Estella election results →
Parties and alliances	Popular vote			Seats	
Parties and alliances	Votes	%	±pp	Total	+/−
Navarrese People's Union (UPN)	2,167	32.13	−8.85	**7**	−1
Gather–Basque Solidarity–Alternative (Bildu–EA–Alternatiba)^{1}	1,321	19.59	+9.39	**4**	+3
Socialist Party of Navarre (PSN–PSOE)	916	13.58	−3.74	**2**	−1
Navarre Yes 2011 (NaBai 2011)	678	10.05	−8.27	**2**	−1
United Left of Navarre (IUN/NEB)	469	6.95	+1.10	**1**	±0
People's Party (PP)	437	6.48	New	**1**	+1
Convergence of Democrats of Navarre (CDN)	248	3.68	−2.28	0	−1
Unitary Candidacy of Estella (CUE/LKB)	195	2.89	New	0	±0
Navarrese and Spanish Right (DNE)	112	1.66	New	0	±0
Blank ballots	201	2.98	+1.61		
**Total**	**6,744**			**17**	**±0**
Valid votes	6,744	98.87	−0.39		
Invalid votes	77	1.13	+0.39		
**Votes cast / turnout**	**6,821**	**65.05**	**−5.09**		
Abstentions	3,665	34.95	+5.09		
**Registered voters**	**10,486**				
Sources
Footnotes: ^{1} Gather–Basque Solidarity–Alternative results are compared to Basque Nationalist Action totals in the 2007 election.

=== Pamplona ===
Population: 197,488

← Summary of the 22 May 2011 City Council of Pamplona election results →
Parties and alliances	Popular vote			Seats	
Parties and alliances	Votes	%	±pp	Total	+/−
Navarrese People's Union (UPN)	34,426	35.80	−7.06	**11**	−2
Navarre Yes 2011 (NaBai 2011)	21,715	22.58	−3.68	**7**	−1
Socialist Party of Navarre (PSN–PSOE)	11,269	11.72	−3.51	**3**	−1
Gather–Basque Solidarity–Alternative (Bildu–EA–Alternatiba)^{1}	10,463	10.88	+4.28	**3**	+1
People's Party (PP)	6,466	6.72	New	**2**	+2
Left (I–E (n))^{2}	5,139	5.34	+1.20	**1**	+1
Greens of Navarre (VN–NB)	1,379	1.43	New	0	±0
Convergence of Democrats of Navarre (CDN)	1,114	1.16	−2.37	0	±0
Union, Progress and Democracy (UPyD)	768	0.80	New	0	±0
Internationalist Solidarity and Self-Management (SAIn)	568	0.59	New	0	±0
For a Fairer World (PUM+J)	286	0.30	New	0	±0
Anti-Bullfighting Party Against Mistreatment of Animals (PACMA/ZAAAA)	282	0.29	New	0	±0
Navarrese and Spanish Right (DNE)	237	0.25	New	0	±0
Carlist Party (EKA)	62	0.06	−0.02	0	±0
Blank ballots	1,997	2.08	+1.09		
**Total**	**96,171**			**27**	**±0**
Valid votes	96,171	99.08	−0.53		
Invalid votes	893	0.92	+0.53		
**Votes cast / turnout**	**97,064**	**66.92**	**−5.06**		
Abstentions	47,978	33.08	+5.06		
**Registered voters**	**145,042**				
Sources
Footnotes: ^{1} Gather–Basque Solidarity–Alternative results are compared to Basque Nationalist Action totals in the 2007 election.; ^{2} Left results are compared to United Left of Navarre totals in the 2007 election.

=== Tafalla ===
Population: 11,413

← Summary of the 22 May 2011 City Council of Tafalla election results →
Parties and alliances	Popular vote			Seats	
Parties and alliances	Votes	%	±pp	Total	+/−
Navarrese People's Union (UPN)	2,084	34.93	−0.41	**7**	±0
Gather–Basque Solidarity–Alternative (Bildu–EA–Alternatiba)^{1}	1,817	30.45	+16.75	**6**	+4
Socialist Party of Navarre (PSN–PSOE)	1,064	17.83	−1.01	**3**	−1
Initiative for Tafalla (InporT)	302	5.06	−5.87	**1**	−1
Left (I–E (n))^{2}	259	4.34	−0.42	0	±0
People's Party (PP)	251	4.21	New	0	±0
Navarre Yes 2011 (NaBai 2011)	108	1.81	−11.46	0	−2
Blank ballots	82	1.37	−0.49		
**Total**	**5,967**			**17**	**±0**
Valid votes	5,967	98.89	−0.30		
Invalid votes	67	1.11	+0.30		
**Votes cast / turnout**	**6,034**	**71.99**	**−0.12**		
Abstentions	2,348	28.01	+0.12		
**Registered voters**	**8,382**				
Sources
Footnotes: ^{1} Gather–Basque Solidarity–Alternative results are compared to Basque Nationalist Action totals in the 2007 election.; ^{2} Left results are compared to United Left of Navarre totals in the 2007 election.

=== Tudela ===
Population: 35,268

← Summary of the 22 May 2011 City Council of Tudela election results →
Parties and alliances	Popular vote			Seats	
Parties and alliances	Votes	%	±pp	Total	+/−
Navarrese People's Union (UPN)	5,400	33.44	−15.85	**8**	−4
Socialist Party of Navarre (PSN–PSOE)	3,651	22.61	−8.62	**5**	−2
Left (I–E (n))^{1}	2,868	17.76	+14.11	**4**	+4
People's Party (PP)	2,595	16.07	New	**4**	+4
Navarre Yes 2011 (NaBai 2011)	536	3.32	−7.63	0	−2
Gather–Basque Solidarity–Alternative (Bildu–EA–Alternatiba)	382	2.37	New	0	±0
Navarrese and Spanish Right (DNE)	153	0.95	New	0	±0
Blank ballots	565	3.50	+2.03		
**Total**	**16,150**			**21**	**±0**
Valid votes	16,150	98.31	−0.15		
Invalid votes	278	1.69	+0.15		
**Votes cast / turnout**	**16,428**	**66.81**	**−6.19**		
Abstentions	8,160	33.19	+6.19		
**Registered voters**	**24,588**				
Sources
Footnotes: ^{1} Left results are compared to United Left of Navarre totals in the 2007 election.

== See also ==
- 2011 Navarrese regional election
