= 2007 Spanish local elections in Navarre =

This article presents the results breakdown of the local elections held in Navarre on 27 May 2007. The following tables show detailed results in the autonomous community's most populous municipalities, sorted alphabetically.

== City control ==
The following table lists party control in the most populous municipalities, including provincial capitals (shown in bold). Gains for a party are displayed with the cell's background shaded in that party's colour.

Municipality	Population	Previous control	New control
Barañain	22,401	Socialist Party of Navarre (PSN–PSOE)	Navarre Yes (NaBai) (UPN in 2008)
Burlada	18,388	Socialist Party of Navarre (PSN–PSOE)	Socialist Party of Navarre (PSN–PSOE)
Egüés	5,379	Navarrese People's Union (UPN)	Navarrese People's Union (UPN)
Estella	13,892	Socialist Party of Navarre (PSN–PSOE)	Navarrese People's Union (UPN)
**Pamplona**	195,769	Navarrese People's Union (UPN)	Navarrese People's Union (UPN)
Tafalla	11,040	Socialist Party of Navarre (PSN–PSOE)	Navarrese People's Union (UPN)
Tudela	32,802	Navarrese People's Union (UPN)	Navarrese People's Union (UPN)

== Municipalities ==
=== Barañain ===
Population: 22,401

← Summary of the 27 May 2007 City Council of Barañain election results →
Parties and alliances	Popular vote			Seats	
Parties and alliances	Votes	%	±pp	Total	+/−
Navarrese People's Union (UPN)	4,175	39.21	+9.22	10	+3
Navarre Yes (NaBai)^{1}	2,825	26.53	+6.21	6	+2
Socialist Party of Navarre (PSN–PSOE)	2,051	19.26	+1.06	4	±0
United Left of Navarre (IUN/NEB)	762	7.16	−3.94	1	−1
Convergence of Democrats of Navarre (CDN)	313	2.94	−2.75	0	−1
Independent Citizens for Barañain (CIB)	300	2.82	−9.34	0	−3
Blank ballots	222	2.08	−0.47		
Total	10,648			21	±0
Valid votes	10,648	94.81	+0.28		
Invalid votes	583	5.19	−0.28		
Votes cast / turnout	11,231	70.29	+2.93		
Abstentions	4,746	29.71	−2.93		
Registered voters	15,977				
Sources
Footnotes: ^{1} Navarre Yes results are compared to the combined totals of Aralar, Assembly and Basque Solidarity–Basque Nationalist Party in the 2003 election.

=== Burlada ===
Population: 18,388

← Summary of the 27 May 2007 City Council of Burlada election results →
Parties and alliances	Popular vote			Seats	
Parties and alliances	Votes	%	±pp	Total	+/−
Navarrese People's Union (UPN)	2,190	24.90	−1.76	5	±0
Socialist Party of Navarre (PSN–PSOE)	2,153	24.48	+2.64	4	±0
Navarre Yes (NaBai)^{1}	2,052	23.33	−0.09	4	+1
Basque Nationalist Action (EAE/ANV)	1,018	11.57	New	2	+2
Convergence of Democrats of Navarre–Independents of Burlada (CDN–UIB)	769	8.74	−5.85	1	−2
United Left of Navarre (IUN/NEB)	463	5.26	−5.57	1	−1
Blank ballots	150	1.71	−0.95		
Total	8,795			17	±0
Valid votes	8,795	99.48	+7.11		
Invalid votes	46	0.52	−7.11		
Votes cast / turnout	8,841	66.53	+4.47		
Abstentions	4,448	33.47	−4.47		
Registered voters	13,289				
Sources
Footnotes: ^{1} Navarre Yes results are compared to the combined totals of Aralar, Assembly and Basque Solidarity–Basque Nationalist Party in the 2003 election.

=== Egüés ===
Population: 5,379

Summary of the 27 May 2007 City Council of Egüés election results →
Parties and alliances	Popular vote			Seats	
Parties and alliances	Votes	%	±pp	Total	+/−
Navarrese People's Union (UPN)	1,949	51.33	+2.75	9	+2
Navarre Yes (NaBai)^{1}	813	21.41	+17.37	3	+3
Socialist Party of Navarre (PSN–PSOE)	388	10.22	+6.05	1	+1
United Left of Navarre (IUN/NEB)	188	4.95	New	0	±0
Convergence of Democrats of Navarre (CDN)	186	4.90	New	0	±0
Basque Nationalist Action (EAE/ANV)^{2}	186	4.90	−3.88	0	−1
Neighbour Association of Gorraiz (AVG)	n/a	n/a	−13.89	0	−2
Independent Coalition of the Egüés Valley (CIVE–EKI)	n/a	n/a	−11.22	0	−1
Blank ballots	87	2.29	−0.95		
Total	3,797			13	+2
Valid votes	3,797	99.53	−0.12		
Invalid votes	18	0.47	+0.12		
Votes cast / turnout	3,815	76.68	−1.32		
Abstentions	1,160	23.32	+1.32		
Registered voters	4,975				
Sources
Footnotes: ^{1} Navarre Yes results are compared to Basque Solidarity totals in the 2003 election.; ^{2} Basque Nationalist Action results are compared to Malakaitz Candidacy totals in the 2003 election.

=== Estella ===
Population: 13,892

← Summary of the 27 May 2007 City Council of Estella election results →
Parties and alliances	Popular vote			Seats	
Parties and alliances	Votes	%	±pp	Total	+/−
Navarrese People's Union (UPN)	3,060	40.98	+3.01	8	+1
Navarre Yes (NaBai)^{1}	1,368	18.32	−2.16	3	±0
Socialist Party of Navarre (PSN–PSOE)	1,293	17.32	−5.73	3	−1
Basque Nationalist Action (EAE/ANV)	762	10.20	New	1	+1
Convergence of Democrats of Navarre (CDN)	445	5.96	−0.77	1	±0
United Left of Navarre (IUN/NEB)	437	5.85	−4.12	1	−1
Blank ballots	102	1.37	−0.44		
Total	7,467			17	±0
Valid votes	7,467	99.26	+6.72		
Invalid votes	56	0.74	−6.72		
Votes cast / turnout	7,523	70.14	+1.72		
Abstentions	3,202	29.86	−1.72		
Registered voters	10,725				
Sources
Footnotes: ^{1} Navarre Yes results are compared to the combined totals of Basque Solidarity, Unitary Candidacy of Estella and Basque Nationalist Party in the 2003 election.

=== Pamplona ===
Population: 195,769

← Summary of the 27 May 2007 City Council of Pamplona election results →
Parties and alliances	Popular vote			Seats	
Parties and alliances	Votes	%	±pp	Total	+/−
Navarrese People's Union (UPN)	46,640	42.86	+0.53	13	±0
Navarre Yes (NaBai)^{1}	28,581	26.26	+5.78	8	+4
Socialist Party of Navarre (PSN–PSOE)	16,578	15.23	−1.50	4	−1
Basque Nationalist Action (EAE/ANV)	7,187	6.60	New	2	+2
United Left of Navarre (IUN/NEB)	4,504	4.14	−6.47	0	−3
Convergence of Democrats of Navarre (CDN)	3,844	3.53	−3.34	0	−2
Humanist Party (PH)	279	0.26	−0.18	0	±0
Carlist Party (EKA)	138	0.08	−0.13	0	±0
Blank ballots	1,081	0.99	−1.19		
Total	108,832			27	±0
Valid votes	108,832	99.61	+5.28		
Invalid votes	421	0.39	−5.28		
Votes cast / turnout	109,253	71.98	+4.57		
Abstentions	42,531	28.02	−4.57		
Registered voters	151,784				
Sources
Footnotes: ^{1} Navarre Yes results are compared to the combined totals of Aralar, Basque Solidarity–Basque Nationalist Party and Assembly in the 2003 election.

=== Tafalla ===
Population: 11,040

← Summary of the 27 May 2007 City Council of Tafalla election results →
Parties and alliances	Popular vote			Seats	
Parties and alliances	Votes	%	±pp	Total	+/−
Navarrese People's Union (UPN)	2,203	35.34	+6.05	7	+2
Socialist Party of Navarre (PSN–PSOE)	1,174	18.84	−4.25	4	±0
Basque Nationalist Action (EAE/ANV)^{1}	854	13.70	−2.95	2	−1
Navarre Yes (NaBai)^{2}	827	13.27	+5.06	2	+1
Initiative for Tafalla (IPT)	681	10.93	New	2	+2
United Left of Navarre (IUN/NEB)	297	4.76	−15.98	0	−4
Convergence of Democrats of Navarre (CDN)	81	1.30	New	0	±0
Blank ballots	116	1.86	−0.16		
Total	6,233			17	±0
Valid votes	6,233	99.19	−0.04		
Invalid votes	51	0.81	+0.04		
Votes cast / turnout	6,284	72.11	−1.33		
Abstentions	2,431	27.89	+1.33		
Registered voters	8,715				
Sources
Footnotes: ^{1} Basque Nationalist Action results are compared to New Tafalla totals in the 2003 election.; ^{2} Navarre Yes results are compared to Basque Solidarity–Basque Nationalist Party totals in the 2003 election.

=== Tudela ===
Population: 32,802

← Summary of the 27 May 2007 City Council of Tudela election results →
Parties and alliances	Popular vote			Seats	
Parties and alliances	Votes	%	±pp	Total	+/−
Navarrese People's Union (UPN)	8,591	49.29	−1.67	12	±0
Socialist Party of Navarre (PSN–PSOE)	5,442	31.23	+11.43	7	+2
Navarre Yes (NaBai)^{1}	1,908	10.95	−1.19	2	±0
United Left of Navarre (IUN/NEB)	636	3.65	−5.46	0	−2
Convergence of Democrats of Navarre (CDN)	507	2.91	−1.35	0	±0
Carlist Party (EKA)	88	0.50	±0.00	0	±0
Blank ballots	256	1.47	−1.75		
Total	17,428			21	±0
Valid votes	17,428	98.46	+0.21		
Invalid votes	272	1.54	−0.21		
Votes cast / turnout	17,700	73.00	+2.05		
Abstentions	6,545	27.00	−2.05		
Registered voters	24,245				
Sources
Footnotes: ^{1} Navarre Yes results are compared to the combined totals of Assembly and Basque Solidarity–Basque Nationalist Party in the 2003 election.

== See also ==
- 2007 Navarrese regional election
