= 2015 Spanish local elections in Navarre =

This article presents the results breakdown of the local elections held in Navarre on 24 May 2015. The following tables show detailed results in the autonomous community's most populous municipalities, sorted alphabetically.

== City control ==
The following table lists party control in the most populous municipalities, including provincial capitals (shown in bold). Gains for a party are displayed with the cell's background shaded in that party's colour.

Municipality	Population	Previous control	New control
Barañain	20,458	Navarrese People's Union (UPN)	Basque Country Gather (EH Bildu)
Burlada	18,237	Navarrese People's Union (UPN)	Changing Burlada (B)
Egüés	19,014	Yes to the Future (GBai)	Yes to the Future (GBai)
Estella	13,695	Navarrese People's Union (UPN)	Basque Country Gather (EH Bildu)
**Pamplona**	196,166	Navarrese People's Union (UPN)	Basque Country Gather (EH Bildu)
Tafalla	10,966	Navarrese People's Union (UPN)	Basque Country Gather (EH Bildu)
Tudela	35,062	Navarrese People's Union (UPN)	Left (I–E (n))

== Municipalities ==
=== Barañain ===
Population: 20,458

← Summary of the 24 May 2015 City Council of Barañain election results →
Parties and alliances	Popular vote			Seats	
Parties and alliances	Votes	%	±pp	Total	+/−
Navarrese People's Union (UPN)	2,853	26.40	−2.23	**6**	−1
Basque Country Gather (EH Bildu)	1,994	18.45	+3.13	**4**	+1
Yes to the Future (GBai)^{1}	1,309	12.11	−5.80	**3**	−1
Socialist Party of Navarre (PSN–PSOE)	1,230	11.38	−4.40	**3**	−1
Participating in Barañain (Participando en Barañain)	1,133	10.48	New	**2**	+2
Left of Barañain–Equo (IE–Equo)	1,092	10.10	+0.98	**2**	±0
People of Barañain (Pueblo de Barañain)	620	5.74	New	**1**	+1
People's Party (PP)	350	3.24	−3.44	0	−1
Blank ballots	227	2.10	−1.38		
**Total**	**10,808**			**21**	**±0**
Valid votes	10,808	98.88	+0.32		
Invalid votes	122	1.12	−0.32		
**Votes cast / turnout**	**10,930**	**70.00**	**+4.71**		
Abstentions	4,684	30.00	−4.71		
**Registered voters**	**15,614**				
Sources
Footnotes: ^{1} Yes to the Future results are compared to Navarre Yes 2011 totals in the 2011 election.

=== Burlada ===
Population: 18,237

← Summary of the 24 May 2015 City Council of Burlada election results →
Parties and alliances	Popular vote			Seats	
Parties and alliances	Votes	%	±pp	Total	+/−
Changing Burlada (B)^{1}	2,424	26.78	+9.70	**5**	+2
Basque Country Gather (EH Bildu)	2,265	25.02	+5.38	**5**	+1
Navarrese People's Union (UPN)	1,774	19.60	−2.72	**4**	±0
Socialist Party of Navarre (PSN–PSOE)	1,312	14.50	−6.03	**2**	−2
Left (I–E (n))	706	7.80	+0.38	**1**	±0
People's Party (PP)	373	4.12	−4.29	0	−1
Blank ballots	197	2.18	−0.79		
**Total**	**9,051**			**17**	**±0**
Valid votes	9,051	98.42	−0.36		
Invalid votes	145	1.58	+0.36		
**Votes cast / turnout**	**9,196**	**66.98**	**+5.47**		
Abstentions	4,534	33.02	−5.47		
**Registered voters**	**13,730**				
Sources
Footnotes: ^{1} Changing Burlada results are compared to Navarre Yes 2011 totals in the 2011 election.

=== Egüés ===
Population: 19,014

← Summary of the 24 May 2015 City Council of Egüés election results →
Parties and alliances	Popular vote			Seats	
Parties and alliances	Votes	%	±pp	Total	+/−
Navarrese People's Union (UPN)	2,558	27.01	−4.17	**6**	±0
Yes to the Future (GBai)^{1}	2,550	26.93	+4.69	**5**	+1
Basque Country Gather (EH Bildu)	1,176	12.42	−0.93	**2**	±0
We Are Egüés Valley (Somos Valle)	1,106	11.68	New	**2**	+2
Socialist Party of Navarre (PSN–PSOE)	800	8.45	−2.23	**1**	−1
Left (I–E (n))	631	6.66	−3.27	**1**	−1
People's Party (PP)	401	4.23	−4.27	0	−1
Blank ballots	247	2.61	−1.51		
**Total**	**9,469**			**17**	**±0**
Valid votes	9,469	98.98	+0.47		
Invalid votes	98	1.02	−0.47		
**Votes cast / turnout**	**9,567**	**73.45**	**+3.15**		
Abstentions	3,459	26.55	−3.15		
**Registered voters**	**13,026**				
Sources
Footnotes: ^{1} Yes to the Future results are compared to Navarre Yes 2011 totals in the 2011 election.

=== Estella ===
Population: 13,695

← Summary of the 24 May 2015 City Council of Estella election results →
Parties and alliances	Popular vote			Seats	
Parties and alliances	Votes	%	±pp	Total	+/−
Navarrese People's Union (UPN)	1,947	28.80	−3.33	**5**	−2
Basque Country Gather (EH Bildu)	1,631	24.12	+4.53	**5**	+1
Estella Now (AOEL)^{1}	1,186	17.54	+10.59	**3**	+2
Socialist Party of Navarre (PSN–PSOE)	864	12.78	−0.80	**2**	±0
Yes to the Future (GBai)^{2}	707	10.46	+0.41	**2**	±0
People's Party (PP)	238	3.52	−2.96	0	−1
Blank ballots	188	2.78	−0.20		
**Total**	**6,761**			**17**	**±0**
Valid votes	6,761	98.82	−0.05		
Invalid votes	81	1.18	+0.05		
**Votes cast / turnout**	**6,842**	**65.24**	**+0.19**		
Abstentions	3,645	34.95	−0.19		
**Registered voters**	**10,487**				
Sources
Footnotes: ^{1} Estella Now results are compared to United Left of Navarre totals in the 2011 election.; ^{2} Yes to the Future results are compared to Navarre Yes 2011 totals in the 2011 election.

=== Pamplona ===
Population: 196,166

← Summary of the 24 May 2015 City Council of Pamplona election results →
Parties and alliances	Popular vote			Seats	
Parties and alliances	Votes	%	±pp	Total	+/−
Navarrese People's Union (UPN)	31,796	31.03	−4.77	**10**	−1
Basque Country Gather (EH Bildu)	17,004	16.60	+5.72	**5**	+2
Yes to the Future (GBai)^{1}	16,114	15.73	−6.85	**5**	−2
Socialist Party of Navarre (PSN–PSOE)	10,293	10.05	−1.67	**3**	±0
Aranzadi–Pamplona in Common (Aranzadi)	9,727	9.49	New	**3**	+3
Left (I–E (n))	5,829	5.69	+0.35	**1**	±0
People's Party (PP)	3,841	3.75	−2.97	0	−2
Citizens–Party of the Citizenry (C's)	3,650	3.56	New	0	±0
Animalist Party Against Mistreatment of Animals (PACMA)	1,279	1.25	+0.96	0	±0
Internationalist Solidarity and Self-Management (SAIn)	650	0.63	+0.04	0	±0
Union, Progress and Democracy (UPyD)	597	0.58	−0.22	0	±0
Blank ballots	1,679	1.64	−0.44		
**Total**	**102,459**			**27**	**±0**
Valid votes	102,459	99.25	+0.17		
Invalid votes	779	0.75	−0.17		
**Votes cast / turnout**	**103,238**	**69.64**	**+2.72**		
Abstentions	45,009	30.36	−2.72		
**Registered voters**	**148,247**				
Sources
Footnotes: ^{1} Yes to the Future results are compared to Navarre Yes 2011 totals in the 2011 election.

=== Tafalla ===
Population: 10,966

← Summary of the 24 May 2015 City Council of Tafalla election results →
Parties and alliances	Popular vote			Seats	
Parties and alliances	Votes	%	±pp	Total	+/−
Basque Country Gather (EH Bildu)	2,405	39.84	+9.39	**8**	+2
Navarrese People's Union (UPN)	1,466	24.28	−10.65	**4**	−3
Initiative for Tafalla (InporT)	859	14.23	+9.17	**2**	+1
Socialist Party of Navarre (PSN–PSOE)	681	11.28	−6.55	**2**	−1
Left (I–E (n))	410	6.79	+2.45	**1**	+1
People's Party (PP)	63	1.04	−3.17	0	±0
Blank ballots	153	2.53	+1.16		
**Total**	**6,037**			**17**	**±0**
Valid votes	6,037	98.31	−0.58		
Invalid votes	104	1.69	+0.58		
**Votes cast / turnout**	**6,141**	**73.05**	**+1.06**		
Abstentions	2,266	26.95	−1.06		
**Registered voters**	**8,407**				

=== Tudela ===
Population: 35,062

← Summary of the 24 May 2015 City Council of Tudela election results →
Parties and alliances	Popular vote			Seats	
Parties and alliances	Votes	%	±pp	Total	+/−
Navarrese People's Union (UPN)	4,349	26.58	−6.86	**6**	−2
Left (I–E (n))	3,766	23.01	+5.25	**6**	+2
Socialist Party of Navarre (PSN–PSOE)	2,408	14.71	−7.90	**3**	−2
Tudela Can (TD PD)	1,933	11.81	New	**3**	+3
People's Party (PP)	1,498	9.15	−6.92	**2**	−2
Tudela Popular Unity Candidacy (CUP)	919	5.62	New	**1**	+1
Union, Progress and Democracy (UPyD)	422	2.58	New	0	±0
Yes to the Future (GBai)^{1}	368	2.25	−1.07	0	±0
Initiative for the Ribera (IX)	266	1.63	New	0	±0
Blank ballots	436	2.66	−0.84		
**Total**	**16,365**			**21**	**±0**
Valid votes	16,365	98.24	−0.07		
Invalid votes	294	1.76	+0.07		
**Votes cast / turnout**	**16,659**	**65.87**	**−0.94**		
Abstentions	8,630	34.13	+0.94		
**Registered voters**	**25,289**				
Sources
Footnotes: ^{1} Yes to the Future results are compared to Navarre Yes 2011 totals in the 2011 election.

== See also ==
- 2015 Navarrese regional election
