= 2023 Spanish local elections in Navarre =

This article presents the results breakdown of the local elections held in Navarre on 28 May 2023. The following tables show detailed results in the autonomous community's most populous municipalities, sorted alphabetically.

== City control ==
The following table lists party control in the most populous municipalities, including provincial capitals (shown in bold). Gains for a party are displayed with the cell's background shaded in that party's colour.

Municipality	Population	Previous control	New control
Barañain	19,537	Navarrese People's Union (UPN)	Navarrese People's Union (UPN)
Burlada	20,398	Navarrese People's Union (UPN)	Basque Country Gather (EH Bildu)
Egüés	21,795	Navarrese People's Union (UPN)	Navarrese People's Union (UPN)
Estella	13,977	Basque Country Gather (EH Bildu)	Navarrese People's Union (UPN)
**Pamplona**	203,418	Navarrese People's Union (UPN)	Navarrese People's Union (UPN) (EH Bildu in 2023)
Tafalla	10,576	Basque Country Gather (EH Bildu)	Basque Country Gather (EH Bildu)
Tudela	37,247	Navarrese People's Union (UPN)	Navarrese People's Union (UPN)

== Municipalities ==
=== Barañain ===
Population: 19,537

← Summary of the 28 May 2023 City Council of Barañain election results →
Parties and alliances	Popular vote			Seats	
Parties and alliances	Votes	%	±pp	Total	+/−
Navarrese People's Union (UPN)^{1}	3,083	31.40	n/a	**6**	±0
Basque Country Gather (EH Bildu)	2,176	22.16	−0.14	**4**	−1
Socialist Party of Navarre (PSN–PSOE)	1,951	19.87	−1.76	**4**	−1
We Can–United Left–Assembly–Green Alliance–Greens Equo (Contigo/Zurekin)^{2}	921	9.38	−2.97	**1**	±0
Yes to the Future (GBai)	822	8.37	+0.04	**1**	−1
People's Party (PP)^{1}	677	6.89	n/a	**1**	±0
Citizens–Party of the Citizenry (CS)^{1}	n/a	n/a	n/a	0	−1
Blank ballots	189	1.92	+0.99		
**Total**	**9,819**			**17**	**−4**
Valid votes	9,819	98.72	−0.75		
Invalid votes	127	1.28	+0.75		
**Votes cast / turnout**	**9,946**	**66.11**	**−5.25**		
Abstentions	5,099	33.89	+5.25		
**Registered voters**	**15,045**				
Sources
Footnotes: ^{1} Within the Sum Navarre alliance in the 2019 election.; ^{2} We Can–United Left–Assembly–Green Alliance–Greens Equo results are compared to the combined totals of We Can, United Left–Equo and Assembly in the 2019 election.

=== Burlada ===
Population: 20,398

← Summary of the 28 May 2023 City Council of Burlada election results →
Parties and alliances	Popular vote			Seats	
Parties and alliances	Votes	%	±pp	Total	+/−
Basque Country Gather (EH Bildu)	2,390	25.76	+4.40	6	+2
Navarrese People's Union (UPN)^{1}	1,902	20.50	n/a	5	+1
Changing (We Can–United Left–Assembly–Green Alliance–Equo) (CCAZ)^{2}	1,835	19.78	−4.55	4	+1
Socialist Party of Navarre (PSN–PSOE)	1,447	15.60	−4.86	3	−1
People's Party (PP)^{1}	778	8.39	n/a	2	+1
Yes to the Future (GBai)	735	7.92	+1.67	1	±0
Blank ballots	191	2.06	+1.19		
**Total**	**9,278**			21	**+4**
Valid votes	9,278	98.50	−0.71		
Invalid votes	141	1.50	+0.71		
**Votes cast / turnout**	**9,419**	**61.72**	**−4.53**		
Abstentions	5,843	38.28	+4.53		
**Registered voters**	**15,262**				
Sources
Footnotes: ^{1} Within the Sum Navarre alliance in the 2019 election.; ^{2} Changing (We Can–United Left–Assembly–Green Alliance–Equo) results are compared to the combined totals of Changing Burlada, We Can and Left in the 2019 election.

=== Egüés ===
Population: 21,795

← Summary of the 28 May 2023 City Council of Egüés election results →
Parties and alliances	Popular vote			Seats	
Parties and alliances	Votes	%	±pp	Total	+/−
Navarrese People's Union (UPN)^{1}	2,237	23.26	n/a	**6**	−1
Basque Country Gather (EH Bildu)	1,618	16.82	+2.10	**4**	+1
LivEgües (V!vegüesb!z!)	1,242	12.91	New	**3**	+3
Socialist Party of Navarre (PSN–PSOE)	1,060	11.02	−5.53	**3**	±0
Yes to the Future (GBai)	952	9.90	−7.34	**2**	−2
Neighbours for the Valley Independent Candidacy (VXV)	686	7.13	New	**1**	+1
People's Party (PP)^{1}	655	6.81	n/a	**1**	±0
We Can–United Left–Assembly–Green Alliance–Greens Equo (Contigo/Zurekin)^{2}	599	6.23	−4.84	**1**	−1
Vox (Vox)	428	4.45	+2.91	0	±0
Citizens–Party of the Citizenry (CS)^{1}	n/a	n/a	n/a	0	−1
Blank ballots	140	1.46	0.47		
**Total**	**9,617**			**21**	**±0**
Valid votes	9,617	99.15	−0.43		
Invalid votes	82	0.85	+0.43		
**Votes cast / turnout**	**9,699**	**67.04**	**−6.44**		
Abstentions	4,769	32.96	+6.44		
**Registered voters**	**14,468**				
Sources
Footnotes: ^{1} Within the Sum Navarre alliance in the 2019 election.; ^{2} We Can–United Left–Assembly–Green Alliance–Greens Equo results are compared to the combined totals of We Can and Left in the 2019 election.

=== Estella ===
Population: 13,977

← Summary of the 28 May 2023 City Council of Estella election results →
Parties and alliances	Popular vote			Seats	
Parties and alliances	Votes	%	±pp	Total	+/−
Navarrese People's Union (UPN)^{1}	2,342	36.84	n/a	**7**	±0
Basque Country Gather (EH Bildu)	1,741	27.38	−0.85	**5**	−1
Socialist Party of Navarre (PSN–PSOE)	710	11.17	−6.55	**2**	−1
Yes to the Future (GBai)	470	7.39	−1.69	**1**	±0
We Can–United Left–Assembly–Green Alliance–Greens Equo (Contigo/Zurekin)^{2}	408	6.42	−1.47	**1**	+1
People's Party (PP)^{1}	329	5.17	n/a	**1**	+1
Independent Party for Estella (IXEL)	245	3.85	New	0	±0
Blank ballots	113	1.78	+1.16		
**Total**	**6,358**			**13**	**±0**
Valid votes	6,358	98.94	−0.56		
Invalid votes	68	1.06	+0.56		
**Votes cast / turnout**	**6,426**	**61.01**	**−6.44**		
Abstentions	4,106	38.99	+6.44		
**Registered voters**	**10,532**				
Sources
Footnotes: ^{1} Within the Sum Navarre alliance in the 2019 election.; ^{2} We Can–United Left–Assembly–Green Alliance–Greens Equo results are compared to the combined totals of Estella Now and We Can in the 2019 election.

=== Pamplona ===
Population: 203,418

← Summary of the 28 May 2023 City Council of Pamplona election results →
Parties and alliances	Popular vote			Seats	
Parties and alliances	Votes	%	±pp	Total	+/−
Navarrese People's Union (UPN)^{1}	30,691	30.30	n/a	**9**	−2
Basque Country Gather (EH Bildu)	27,752	27.40	+2.59	**8**	+1
Socialist Party of Navarre (PSN–PSOE)	15,850	15.65	−0.54	**5**	±0
People's Party (PP)^{1}	8,526	8.42	n/a	**2**	+1
Yes to the Future (GBai)	7,654	7.56	−0.26	**2**	±0
We Can–United Left–Assembly–Green Alliance–Greens Equo (Contigo/Zurekin)^{2}	5,228	5.16	−2.87	**1**	+1
Vox (Vox)	2,938	2.90	+1.81	0	±0
For a Fairer World (PUM+J)	710	0.70	New	0	±0
Citizens–Party of the Citizenry (CS)^{1}	431	0.43	n/a	0	−1
Blank Seats to Leave Empty Seats (EB)	282	0.28	New	0	±0
Spanish Phalanx of the CNSO (FE de las JONS)	49	0.05	New	0	±0
Blank ballots	1,167	1.15	+0.58		
**Total**	**101,278**			**27**	**±0**
Valid votes	101,278	99.18	−0.41		
Invalid votes	833	0.82	+0.41		
**Votes cast / turnout**	**102,111**	**66.62**	**−4.47**		
Abstentions	51,164	33.38	+4.47		
**Registered voters**	**153,275**				
Sources
Footnotes: ^{1} Within the Sum Navarre alliance in the 2019 election.; ^{2} We Can–United Left–Assembly–Green Alliance–Greens Equo results are compared to the combined totals of We Can, Left and Aranzadi–Equo in the 2019 election.

=== Tafalla ===
Population: 10,576

← Summary of the 28 May 2023 City Council of Tafalla election results →
Parties and alliances	Popular vote			Seats	
Parties and alliances	Votes	%	±pp	Total	+/−
Basque Country Gather (EH Bildu)	1,649	30.46	+5.57	**6**	+1
Navarrese People's Union (UPN)^{1}	1,268	23.43	n/a	**4**	−1
Socialist Party of Navarre (PSN–PSOE)	1,047	19.34	−0.05	**4**	+1
Initiative for Tafalla (InporT)	518	9.57	−4.78	**1**	−1
We Can–United Left–Assembly–Green Alliance–Greens Equo (Contigo/Zurekin)^{2}	454	8.39	−1.18	**1**	±0
Yes to the Future (GBai)	294	5.43	−0.41	**1**	±0
People's Party (PP)^{1}	115	2.12	n/a	0	±0
Blank ballots	68	1.26	+0.27		
**Total**	**5,413**			**17**	**±0**
Valid votes	5,413	98.60	0.70		
Invalid votes	77	1.40	+0.70		
**Votes cast / turnout**	**5,490**	**67.44**	**−5.13**		
Abstentions	2,650	32.56	+5.13		
**Registered voters**	**8,140**				
Sources
Footnotes: ^{1} Within the Sum Navarre alliance in the 2019 election.; ^{2} We Can–United Left–Assembly–Green Alliance–Greens Equo results are compared to the combined totals of Left and We Can in the 2019 election.

=== Tudela ===
Population: 37,247

← Summary of the 28 May 2023 City Council of Barañain election results →
Parties and alliances	Popular vote			Seats	
Parties and alliances	Votes	%	±pp	Total	+/−
Navarrese People's Union (UPN)^{1}	7,420	43.26	n/a	**11**	+3
We Can–United Left–Assembly–Green Alliance–Greens Equo (Contigo/Zurekin)^{2}	4,191	24.43	−6.68	**6**	−1
Socialist Party of Navarre (PSN–PSOE)	2,403	14.01	−0.73	**3**	±0
People's Party (PP)^{1}	1,291	7.53	n/a	**1**	−1
Vox (Vox)	849	4.95	+2.65	0	±0
Basque Country Gather (EH Bildu)	472	2.75	New	0	±0
Citizens–Party of the Citizenry (CS)^{1}	169	0.99	n/a	0	−1
Yes to the Future (GBai)	153	0.89	−0.18	0	±0
Blank ballots	205	1.20	+0.25		
**Total**	**17,153**			**21**	**±0**
Valid votes	17,153	98.85	−0.64		
Invalid votes	199	1.15	+0.64		
**Votes cast / turnout**	**17,352**	**67.40**	**−0.31**		
Abstentions	8,391	32.60	+0.31		
**Registered voters**	**25,743**				
Sources
Footnotes: ^{1} Within the Sum Navarre alliance in the 2019 election.; ^{2} We Can–United Left–Assembly–Green Alliance–Greens Equo results are compared to the combined totals of Left and We Can in the 2019 election.

== See also ==
- 2023 Navarrese regional election
