= 2019 Spanish local elections in Navarre =

This article presents the results breakdown of the local elections held in Navarre on 26 May 2019. The following tables show detailed results in the autonomous community's most populous municipalities, sorted alphabetically.

== City control ==
The following table lists party control in the most populous municipalities, including provincial capitals (shown in bold). Gains for a party are displayed with the cell's background shaded in that party's colour.

Municipality	Population	Previous control	New control
Barañain	20,039	Basque Country Gather (EH Bildu)	Sum Navarre (NA+)
Burlada	18,934	Changing Burlada (B)	Sum Navarre (NA+)
Egüés	20,774	Yes to the Future (GBai)	Sum Navarre (NA+)
Estella	13,673	Basque Country Gather (EH Bildu)	Sum Navarre (NA+) (EH Bildu in 2020)
**Pamplona**	199,066	Basque Country Gather (EH Bildu)	Sum Navarre (NA+)
Tafalla	10,605	Basque Country Gather (EH Bildu)	Basque Country Gather (EH Bildu)
Tudela	35,593	Left (I–E (n))	Sum Navarre (NA+)

== Municipalities ==
=== Barañain ===
Population: 20,039

← Summary of the 26 May 2019 City Council of Barañain election results →
Parties and alliances	Popular vote			Seats	
Parties and alliances	Votes	%	±pp	Total	+/−
Sum Navarre (NA+)^{1}	3,803	34.45	+4.81	**8**	+2
Basque Country Gather (EH Bildu)	2,462	22.30	+3.85	**5**	+1
Socialist Party of Navarre (PSN–PSOE)	2,387	21.63	+10.25	**5**	+2
Yes to the Future (GBai)	920	8.33	−3.78	**2**	−1
We Can (Podemos)^{2}	624	5.65	−4.83	**1**	−1
United Left–Equo (IU–Equo)^{3}	523	4.74	−5.36	0	−2
Assembly (Batzarre)	216	1.96	New	0	±0
People of Barañain (Pueblo de Barañain)	n/a	n/a	−5.74	0	−1
Blank ballots	103	0.93	−1.17		
**Total**	**11,038**			**21**	**±0**
Valid votes	11,038	99.47	+0.59		
Invalid votes	59	0.53	−0.59		
**Votes cast / turnout**	**11,097**	**71.36**	**+1.36**		
Abstentions	4,454	28.64	−1.36		
**Registered voters**	**15,551**				
Sources
Footnotes: ^{1} Sum Navarre results are compared to the combined totals of Navarrese People's Union and People's Party in the 2015 election.; ^{2} We Can results are compared to Participating in Barañain totals in the 2015 election.; ^{3} United Left–Equo results are compared to Left of Barañain–Equo totals in the 2015 election.

=== Burlada ===
Population: 18,934

← Summary of the 26 May 2019 City Council of Burlada election results →
Parties and alliances	Popular vote			Seats	
Parties and alliances	Votes	%	±pp	Total	+/−
Sum Navarre (NA+)^{1}	2,504	26.72	+3.00	**5**	+1
Basque Country Gather (EH Bildu)	2,002	21.36	−3.66	**4**	−1
Socialist Party of Navarre (PSN–PSOE)	1,918	20.46	+5.96	**4**	+2
Changing Burlada (CB/BA)	1,405	14.99	−11.79	**2**	−3
We Can (Podemos)	633	6.75	New	**1**	+1
Yes to the Future (GBai)	586	6.25	New	**1**	+1
Left (I–E (n))	243	2.59	−5.21	0	−1
Blank ballots	82	0.87	−1.31		
**Total**	**9,373**			**17**	**±0**
Valid votes	9,373	99.21	+0.79		
Invalid votes	75	0.79	−0.79		
**Votes cast / turnout**	**9,448**	**66.25**	**−0.73**		
Abstentions	4,813	33.75	+0.73		
**Registered voters**	**14,261**				
Sources
Footnotes: ^{1} Sum Navarre results are compared to the combined totals of Navarrese People's Union and People's Party in the 2015 election.

=== Egüés ===
Population: 20,774

← Summary of the 26 May 2019 City Council of Egüés election results →
Parties and alliances	Popular vote			Seats	
Parties and alliances	Votes	%	±pp	Total	+/−
Sum Navarre (NA+)^{1}	3,807	37.88	+6.64	**9**	+3
Yes to the Future (GBai)	1,733	17.24	−9.69	**4**	−1
Socialist Party of Navarre (PSN–PSOE)	1,663	16.55	+8.10	**3**	+2
Basque Country Gather (EH Bildu)	1,480	14.72	+2.30	**3**	+1
We Can (Podemos)^{2}	606	6.03	−5.65	**1**	−1
Left (I–E (n))	507	5.04	−1.62	**1**	±0
Vox (Vox)	155	1.54	New	0	±0
Blank ballots	100	0.99	−1.62		
**Total**	**10,051**			**21**	**+4**
Valid votes	10,051	99.58	+0.60		
Invalid votes	42	0.42	−0.60		
**Votes cast / turnout**	**10,093**	**73.48**	**+0.03**		
Abstentions	3,643	26.52	−0.03		
**Registered voters**	**13,736**				
Sources
Footnotes: ^{1} Sum Navarre results are compared to the combined totals of Navarrese People's Union and People's Party in the 2015 election.; ^{2} We Can results are compared to We Are Egüés Valley totals in the 2015 election.

=== Estella ===
Population: 13,673

← Summary of the 26 May 2019 City Council of Estella election results →
Parties and alliances	Popular vote			Seats	
Parties and alliances	Votes	%	±pp	Total	+/−
Sum Navarre (NA+)^{1}	2,530	35.55	+3.23	**7**	+2
Basque Country Gather (EH Bildu)	2,009	28.23	+4.11	**6**	+1
Socialist Party of Navarre (PSN–PSOE)	1,261	17.72	+4.94	**3**	+1
Yes to the Future (GBai)	646	9.08	−1.38	**1**	−1
Estella Now (AOEL)	324	4.55	−12.99	0	−3
We Can (Podemos)	238	3.34	New	0	±0
Vox (Vox)	64	0.90	New	0	±0
Blank ballots	44	0.62	−2.16		
**Total**	**7,116**			**17**	**±0**
Valid votes	7,116	99.50	+0.68		
Invalid votes	36	0.50	−0.68		
**Votes cast / turnout**	**7,152**	**67.45**	**+2.21**		
Abstentions	3,451	32.55	−2.21		
**Registered voters**	**10,603**				
Sources
Footnotes: ^{1} Sum Navarre results are compared to the combined totals of Navarrese People's Union and People's Party in the 2015 election.

=== Pamplona ===
Population: 199,066

← Summary of the 26 May 2019 City Council of Pamplona election results →
Parties and alliances	Popular vote			Seats	
Parties and alliances	Votes	%	±pp	Total	+/−
Sum Navarre (NA+)^{1}	43,643	40.58	+2.24	**13**	+3
Basque Country Gather (EH Bildu)	26,691	24.81	+8.21	**7**	+2
Socialist Party of Navarre (PSN–PSOE)	17,417	16.19	+6.14	**5**	+2
Yes to the Future (GBai)	8,406	7.82	−7.91	**2**	−3
We Can (Podemos)	4,113	3.82	New	0	±0
Left (I–E (n))	3,657	3.40	−2.29	0	−1
Vox (Vox)	1,176	1.09	New	0	±0
Aranzadi–Equo (AE)	867	0.81	−8.68	0	−3
Democratic Centre Coalition (CCD)	275	0.26	New	0	±0
Let's Win Pamplona–Ecologists Yes We Can (Ganemos)	258	0.24	New	0	±0
For a Fairer World (PUM+J)	226	0.21	New	0	±0
Internationalist Solidarity and Self-Management (SAIn)	216	0.20	−0.43	0	±0
Blank ballots	616	0.57	−1.07		
**Total**	**107,561**			**27**	**±0**
Valid votes	107,561	99.59	+0.34		
Invalid votes	441	0.41	−0.34		
**Votes cast / turnout**	**108,002**	**71.09**	**+1.45**		
Abstentions	43,914	28.91	−1.45		
**Registered voters**	**151,916**				
Sources
Footnotes: ^{1} Sum Navarre results are compared to the combined totals of Navarrese People's Union, People's Party and Citizens–Party of the Citizenry in the 2015 election.

=== Tafalla ===
Population: 10,605

← Summary of the 26 May 2019 City Council of Tafalla election results →
Parties and alliances	Popular vote			Seats	
Parties and alliances	Votes	%	±pp	Total	+/−
Sum Navarre (NA+)^{1}	1,485	24.97	−0.35	**5**	+1
Basque Country Gather (EH Bildu)	1,480	24.89	−14.95	**5**	−3
Socialist Party of Navarre (PSN–PSOE)	1,153	19.39	+8.11	**3**	+1
Initiative for Tafalla (InporT)	853	14.35	+0.12	**2**	±0
Left (I–E (n))	365	6.14	−0.65	**1**	±0
Yes to the Future (GBai)	347	5.84	New	**1**	+1
We Can (Podemos)	204	3.43	New	0	±0
Blank ballots	59	0.99	−1.54		
**Total**	**5,946**			**17**	**±0**
Valid votes	5,946	99.30	+0.99		
Invalid votes	42	0.70	−0.99		
**Votes cast / turnout**	**5,988**	**72.57**	**−0.48**		
Abstentions	2,263	27.43	+0.48		
**Registered voters**	**8,251**				
Sources
Footnotes: ^{1} Sum Navarre results are compared to the combined totals of Navarrese People's Union and People's Party in the 2015 election.

=== Tudela ===
Population: 35,593

← Summary of the 26 May 2019 City Council of Tudela election results →
Parties and alliances	Popular vote			Seats	
Parties and alliances	Votes	%	±pp	Total	+/−
Sum Navarre (NA+)^{1}	7,765	44.78	+9.05	**11**	+3
Left (I–E (n))	4,827	27.83	+4.82	**7**	+1
Socialist Party of Navarre (PSN–PSOE)	2,556	14.74	+0.03	**3**	±0
We Can (Podemos)^{2}	568	3.28	−8.53	0	−3
Tudela Popular Unity Candidacy (CUP)	453	2.61	−3.01	0	−1
Neighbours for Tudela (VVTDL)	424	2.44	New	0	±0
Vox (Vox)	399	2.30	New	0	±0
Yes to the Future (GBai)	185	1.07	New	0	±0
Blank ballots	165	0.95	−1.71		
**Total**	**17,342**			**21**	**±0**
Valid votes	17,342	99.49	+1.25		
Invalid votes	89	0.51	−1.25		
**Votes cast / turnout**	**17,431**	**67.71**	**+1.84**		
Abstentions	8,311	32.29	−1.84		
**Registered voters**	**25,742**				
Sources
Footnotes: ^{1} Sum Navarre results are compared to the combined totals of Navarrese People's Union and People's Party in the 2015 election.; ^{2} We Can results are compared to Tudela Can totals in the 2015 election.

== See also ==
- 2019 Navarrese regional election
