= Gorráiz =

- Locality
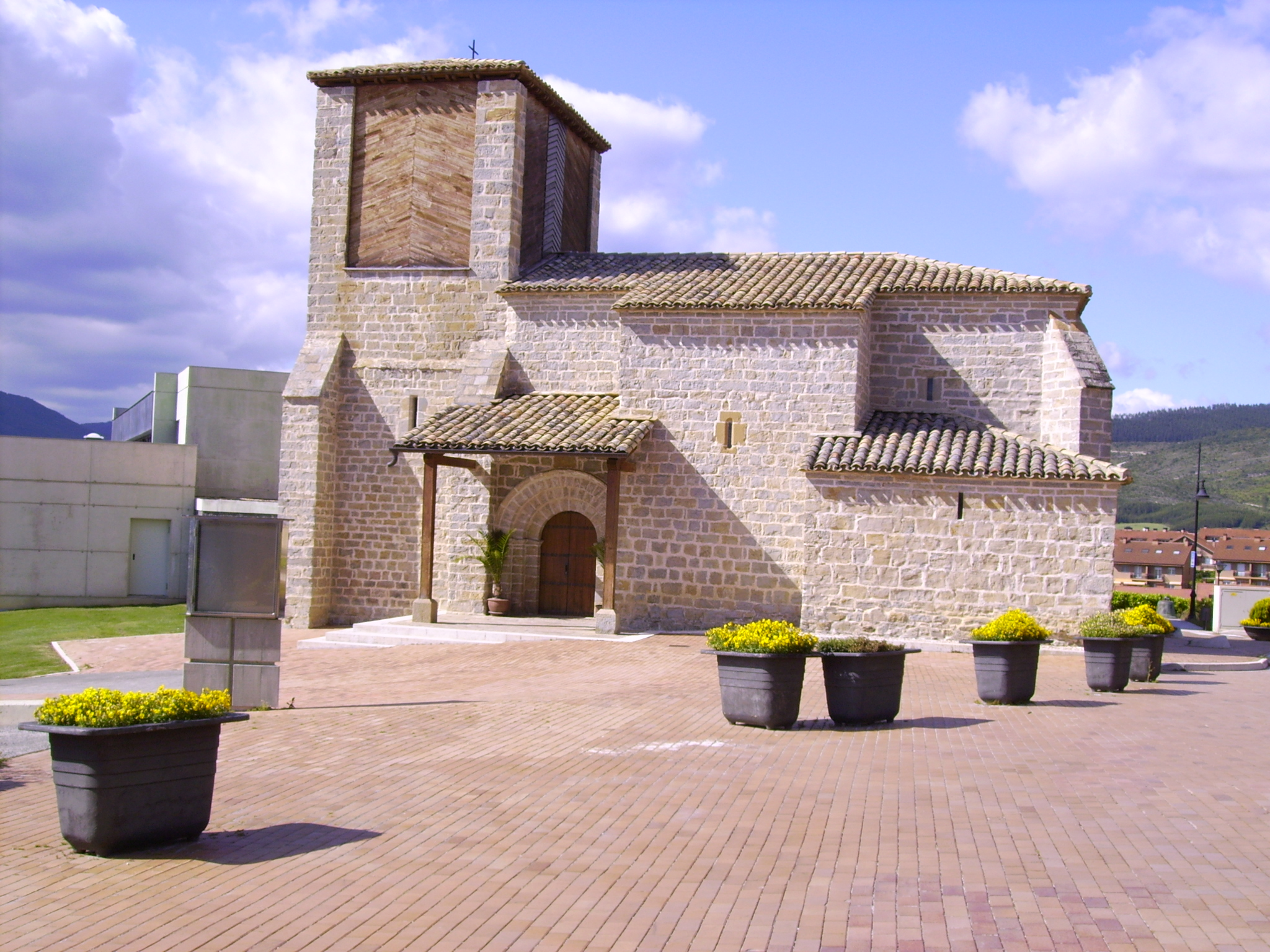

- Location within Navarre Location within Spain
- Coordinates: 42°49′25″N 1°35′5″W
- Country: Spain
- Community: Navarre
- Province: Navarre
- Municipality: Valle de Egüés
- Elevation: 459 m (1,506 ft)

Population
  - Total: 3,601

Gorráiz is a locality located in the municipality of Valle de Egüés, in Navarre province, Spain, Spain. As of 2020, it has a population of 3,601.

== Geography ==
Gorráiz is located 8km east of Pamplona.
