= 2003 Spanish local elections in Navarre =

This article presents the results breakdown of the local elections held in Navarre on 25 May 2003. The following tables show detailed results in the autonomous community's most populous municipalities, sorted alphabetically.

== City control ==
The following table lists party control in the most populous municipalities, including provincial capitals (highlighted in bold). Gains for a party are highlighted in that party's colour.

Municipality	Population	Previous control	New control
Barañain	22,017	Independent Citizens for Barañain (CIB)	Socialist Party of Navarre (PSN–PSOE)
Burlada	17,647	Navarrese People's Union (UPN)	Socialist Party of Navarre (PSN–PSOE)
Estella	13,150	Navarrese People's Union (UPN)	Socialist Party of Navarre (PSN–PSOE)
**Pamplona**	189,364	Navarrese People's Union (UPN)	Navarrese People's Union (UPN)
Tafalla	10,646	Navarrese People's Union (UPN)	Socialist Party of Navarre (PSN–PSOE)
Tudela	30,355	Navarrese People's Union (UPN)	Navarrese People's Union (UPN)

== Municipalities ==
=== Barañain ===
Population: 22,017

← Summary of the 25 May 2003 City Council of Barañain election results →
Parties and alliances	Popular vote			Seats	
Parties and alliances	Votes	%	±pp	Total	+/−
Navarrese People's Union (UPN)	3,080	29.99	New	7	+7
Socialist Party of Navarre (PSN–PSOE)	1,869	18.20	−6.46	4	−2
Independent Citizens for Barañain (CIB)	1,249	12.16	−14.65	3	−3
United Left of Navarre (IUN/NEB)	1,140	11.10	−0.01	2	±0
Aralar (Aralar)	831	8.09	New	2	+2
Assembly (Batzarre)^{1}	643	6.26	−12.00	1	−3
Basque Solidarity–Basque Nationalist Party (EA–PNV)	613	5.97	+0.33	1	±0
Convergence of Democrats of Navarre (CDN)	584	5.69	−3.78	1	−1
Blank ballots	262	2.55	−1.49		
**Total**	**10,271**			21	**±0**
Valid votes	10,271	94.53	−4.69		
Invalid votes	594	5.47	+4.69		
**Votes cast / turnout**	**10,865**	**67.36**	**+9.15**		
Abstentions	5,264	32.64	−9.15		
**Registered voters**	**16,129**				
Sources
Footnotes: ^{1} Assembly results are compared to Basque Citizens–United Cendea totals in the 1999 election.

=== Burlada ===
Population: 17,647

← Summary of the 25 May 2003 City Council of Burlada election results →
Parties and alliances	Popular vote			Seats	
Parties and alliances	Votes	%	±pp	Total	+/−
Navarrese People's Union (UPN)	2,083	26.66	−1.61	**5**	±0
Socialist Party of Navarre (PSN–PSOE)	1,706	21.84	+2.36	**4**	±0
Convergence of Democrats of Navarre–Independents of Burlada (CDN–UIB)^{1}	1,140	14.59	−0.39	**3**	±0
Aralar (Aralar)	1,034	13.23	New	**2**	+2
United Left of Navarre (IUN/NEB)	846	10.83	+3.02	**2**	+1
Assembly (Batzarre)	468	5.99	New	**1**	+1
Basque Solidarity–Basque Nationalist Party (EA–PNV)	328	4.20	+1.11	0	±0
Basque Citizens (EH)	n/a	n/a	−23.57	0	−4
Blank ballots	208	2.66	−0.15		
**Total**	**7,813**			**17**	**±0**
Valid votes	7,813	92.37	−6.93		
Invalid votes	645	7.63	+6.93		
**Votes cast / turnout**	**8,458**	**62.06**	**+6.51**		
Abstentions	5,171	37.94	−6.51		
**Registered voters**	**13,629**				
Sources
Footnotes: ^{1} Convergence of Democrats of Navarre–Independents of Burlada results are compared to the combined totals of Convergence of Democrats of Navarre and Unity of Independents of Burlada in the 1999 election.

=== Estella ===
Population: 13,150

← Summary of the 25 May 2003 City Council of Estella election results →
Parties and alliances	Popular vote			Seats	
Parties and alliances	Votes	%	±pp	Total	+/−
Navarrese People's Union (UPN)	2,585	37.97	−2.15	7	−1
Socialist Party of Navarre (PSN–PSOE)	1,569	23.05	+0.23	4	±0
United Left of Navarre (IUN/NEB)	679	9.97	+1.38	2	+1
Basque Solidarity (EA)^{1}	522	7.67	−1.00	1	±0
Convergence of Democrats of Navarre (CDN)	458	6.73	+4.08	1	+1
Unitary Candidacy of Estella (CUE/LKB)^{2}	447	6.57	−8.40	1	−2
Basque Nationalist Party (EAJ/PNV)	425	6.24	New	1	+1
Blank ballots	123	1.81	−0.37		
**Total**	**6,808**			17	**±0**
Valid votes	6,808	92.54	−6.59		
Invalid votes	549	7.46	+6.59		
**Votes cast / turnout**	**7,357**	**68.42**	**+4.32**		
Abstentions	3,395	31.58	−4.32		
**Registered voters**	**10,752**				
Sources
Footnotes: ^{1} Basque Solidarity results are compared to Basque Solidarity–Basque Nationalist Party totals in the 1999 election.; ^{2} Unitary Candidacy of Estella results are compared to Basque Citizens–Unitary Candidacy of Estella totals in the 1999 election.

=== Pamplona ===
Population: 189,364

← Summary of the 25 May 2003 City Council of Pamplona election results →
Parties and alliances	Popular vote			Seats	
Parties and alliances	Votes	%	±pp	Total	+/−
Navarrese People's Union (UPN)	41,301	42.33	+1.73	**13**	+1
Socialist Party of Navarre (PSN–PSOE)	16,324	16.73	+1.97	**5**	+1
United Left of Navarre (IUN/NEB)	10,355	10.61	+2.91	**3**	+1
Aralar (Aralar)	9,416	9.65	New	**2**	+2
Basque Solidarity–Basque Nationalist Party (EA–PNV)	7,242	7.42	+2.76	**2**	+2
Convergence of Democrats of Navarre (CDN)	6,700	6.87	−3.02	**2**	−1
Assembly (Batzarre)	3,328	3.41	New	0	±0
Humanist Party (PH)	428	0.44	+0.21	0	±0
Carlist Party (EKA–PC)	208	0.21	+0.06	0	±0
Spanish Front (Frente)	80	0.08	New	0	±0
Independent Spanish Phalanx–Phalanx 2000 (FEI–FE 2000)	64	0.07	New	0	±0
Basque Citizens (EH)	n/a	n/a	−19.21	0	−6
Blank ballots	2,129	2.18	−0.01		
**Total**	**97,575**			**27**	**±0**
Valid votes	97,575	94.33	−5.14		
Invalid votes	5,865	5.67	+5.14		
**Votes cast / turnout**	**103,440**	**67.42**	**+6.27**		
Abstentions	49,987	32.58	−6.27		
**Registered voters**	**153,427**				

=== Tafalla ===
Population: 10,646

← Summary of the 23 May 2003 City Council of Tafalla election results →
Parties and alliances	Popular vote			Seats	
Parties and alliances	Votes	%	±pp	Total	+/−
Navarrese People's Union (UPN)	1,856	29.29	−8.87	5	−2
Socialist Party of Navarre (PSN–PSOE)	1,463	23.09	−1.49	4	−1
United Left of Navarre (IUN/NEB)	1,314	20.74	+12.89	4	+3
New Tafalla (Tafalla Berri)^{1}	1,055	16.65	−2.64	3	±0
Basque Solidarity–Basque Nationalist Party (EA–PNV)	520	8.21	+1.97	1	±0
Blank ballots	128	2.02	+0.55		
**Total**	**6,336**			17	**±0**
Valid votes	6,336	99.23	−0.21		
Invalid votes	49	0.77	+0.21		
**Votes cast / turnout**	**6,385**	**73.44**	**+3.98**		
Abstentions	2,309	26.56	−3.98		
**Registered voters**	**8,694**				
Sources
Footnotes: ^{1} New Tafalla results are compared to Basque Citizens totals in the 1999 election.

=== Tudela ===
Population: 30,355

← Summary of the 23 May 2003 City Council of Tudela election results →
Parties and alliances	Popular vote			Seats	
Parties and alliances	Votes	%	±pp	Total	+/−
Navarrese People's Union (UPN)	8,404	50.96	+3.29	**12**	±0
Socialist Party of Navarre (PSN–PSOE)	3,266	19.80	−5.63	**5**	−1
Assembly (Batzarre)	1,766	10.71	+2.22	**2**	±0
United Left of Navarre (IUN/NEB)	1,503	9.11	+2.14	**2**	+1
Convergence of Democrats of Navarre (CDN)	702	4.26	+1.61	0	±0
Basque Solidarity–Basque Nationalist Party (EA–PNV)	236	1.43	New	0	±0
Carlist Party (EKA–PC)	83	0.50	New	0	±0
Blank ballots	531	3.22	+0.31		
**Total**	**16,491**			**21**	**±0**
Valid votes	16,491	98.25	−0.55		
Invalid votes	293	1.75	+0.55		
**Votes cast / turnout**	**16,784**	**70.95**	**+3.74**		
Abstentions	6,871	29.05	−3.74		
**Registered voters**	**23,655**				

== See also ==
- 2003 Navarrese regional election
