= Elía =

- Council
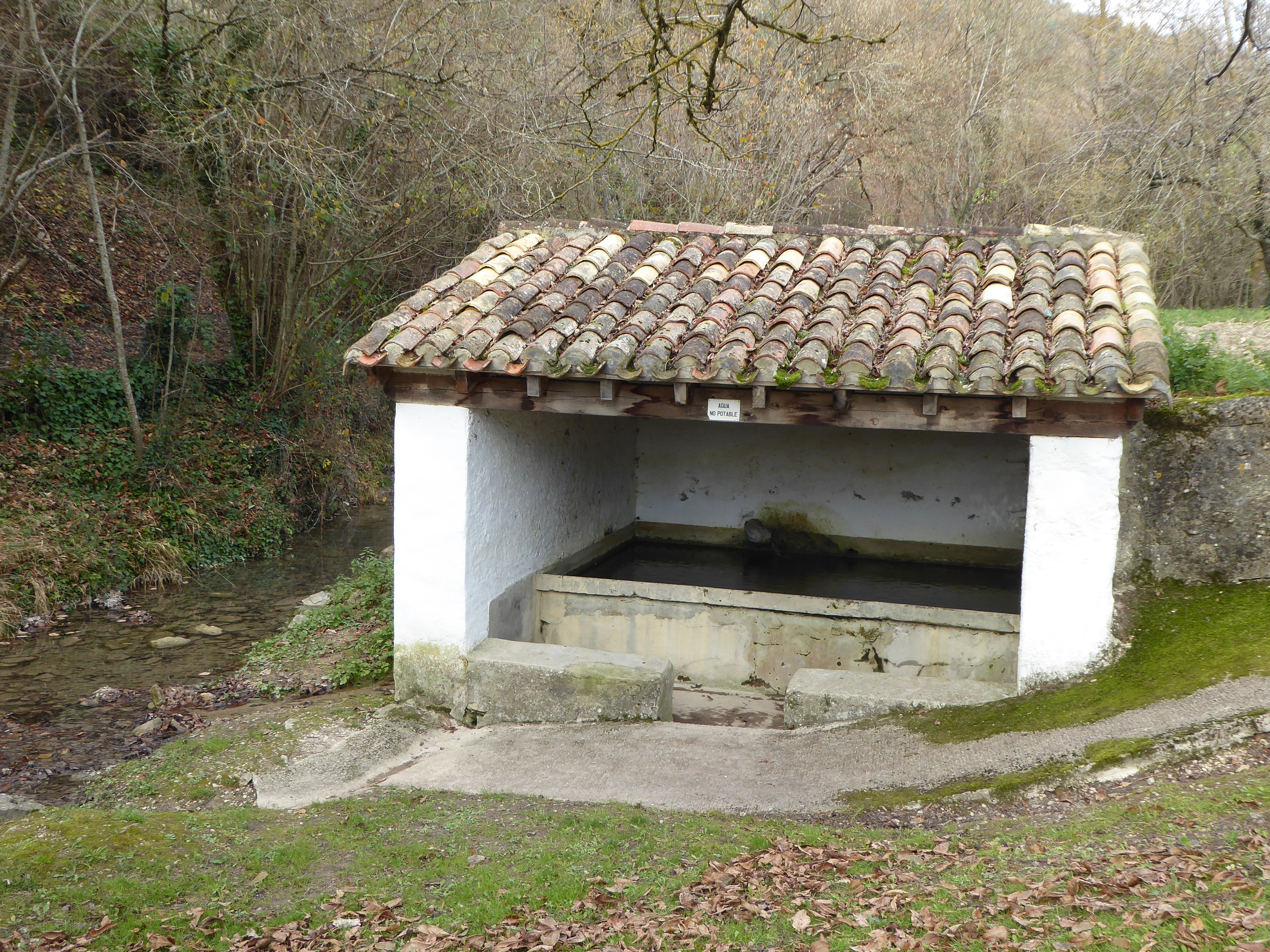

- Location within Navarre Location within Spain
- Coordinates: 42°50′29″N 1°31′0″W
- Country: Spain
- Community: Navarre
- Province: Navarre
- Municipality: Valle de Egüés
- Elevation: 581 m (1,906 ft)

Population
  - Total: 17

Elía is a locality and council located in the municipality of Valle de Egüés, in Navarre province, Spain. As of 2020, it has a population of 17.

== Geography ==
Elía is located 14km east-northeast of Pamplona.
