= Sagaseta =

- Council
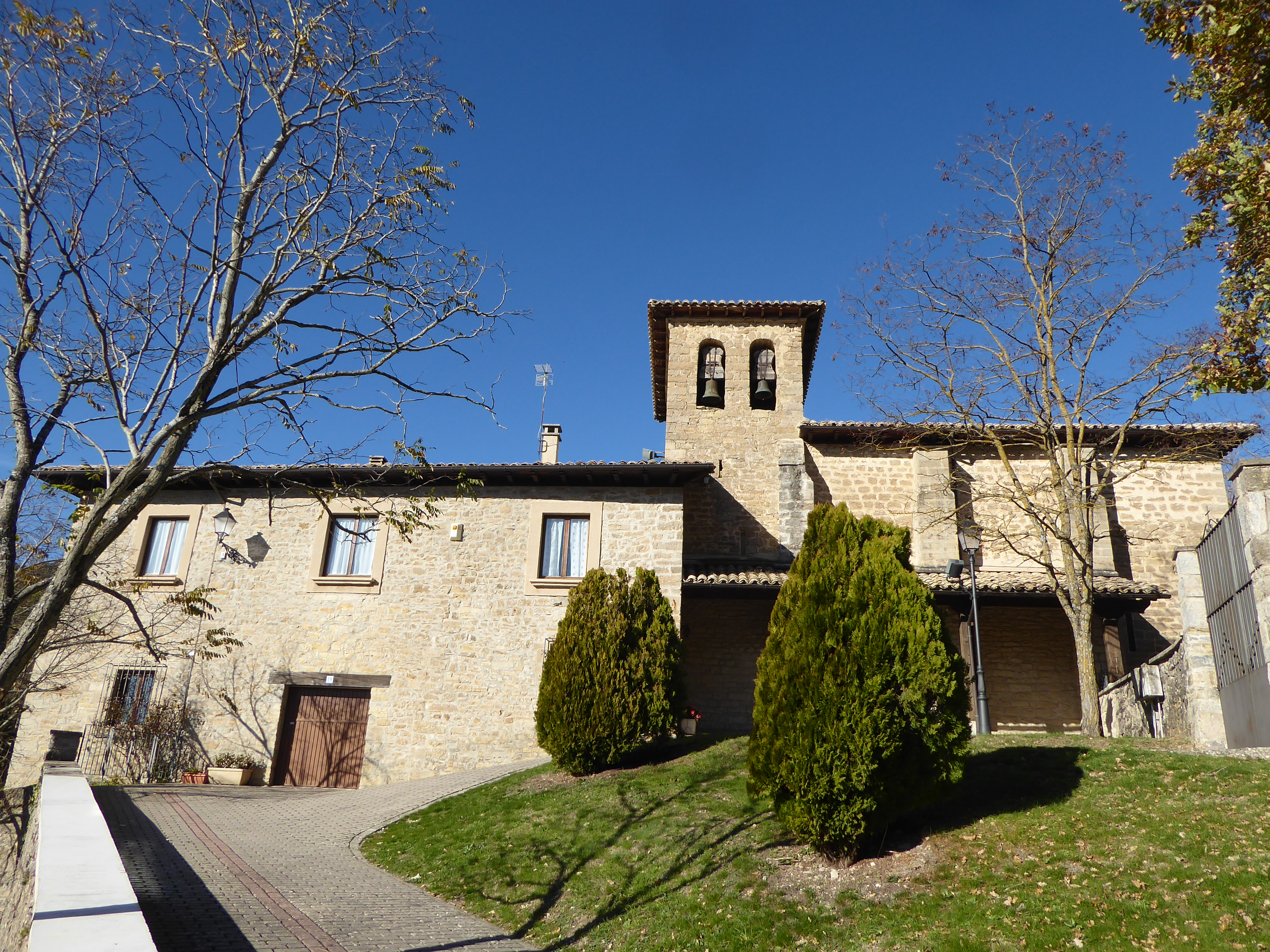

- Location within Navarre Location within Spain
- Coordinates: 42°50′33″N 1°32′36″W
- Country: Spain
- Community: Navarre
- Province: Navarre
- Municipality: Valle de Egüés
- Elevation: 558 m (1,831 ft)

Population
  - Total: 43

Sagaseta is a locality and council located in the municipality of Valle de Egüés, in Navarre province, Spain, Spain. As of 2020, it has a population of 43.

== Geography ==
Sagaseta is located 12km east-northeast of Pamplona.
