= Egüés (Valle de Egüés) =

- Council
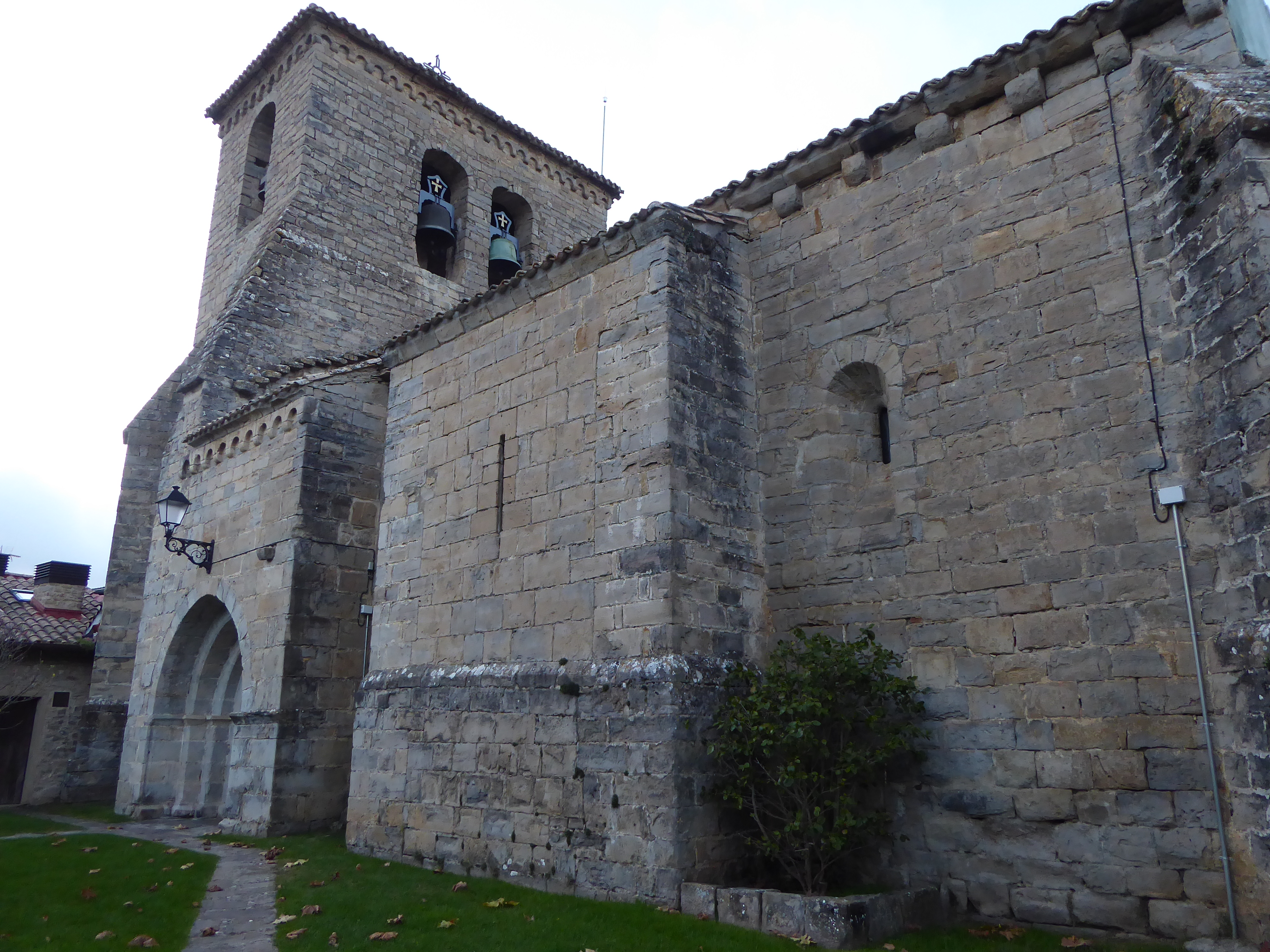

- Location within Navarre Location within Spain
- Coordinates: 42°49′30″N 1°33′6″W
- Country: Spain
- Community: Navarre
- Province: Navarre
- Municipality: Valle de Egüés
- Elevation: 502 m (1,647 ft)

Population
  - Total: 410

Egüés is a locality and council located in the municipality of Valle de Egüés, in Navarre province, Spain, Spain. As of 2020, it has a population of 410.

== Geography ==
Egüés is located 10km east of Pamplona.
