= Badostáin =

- Council
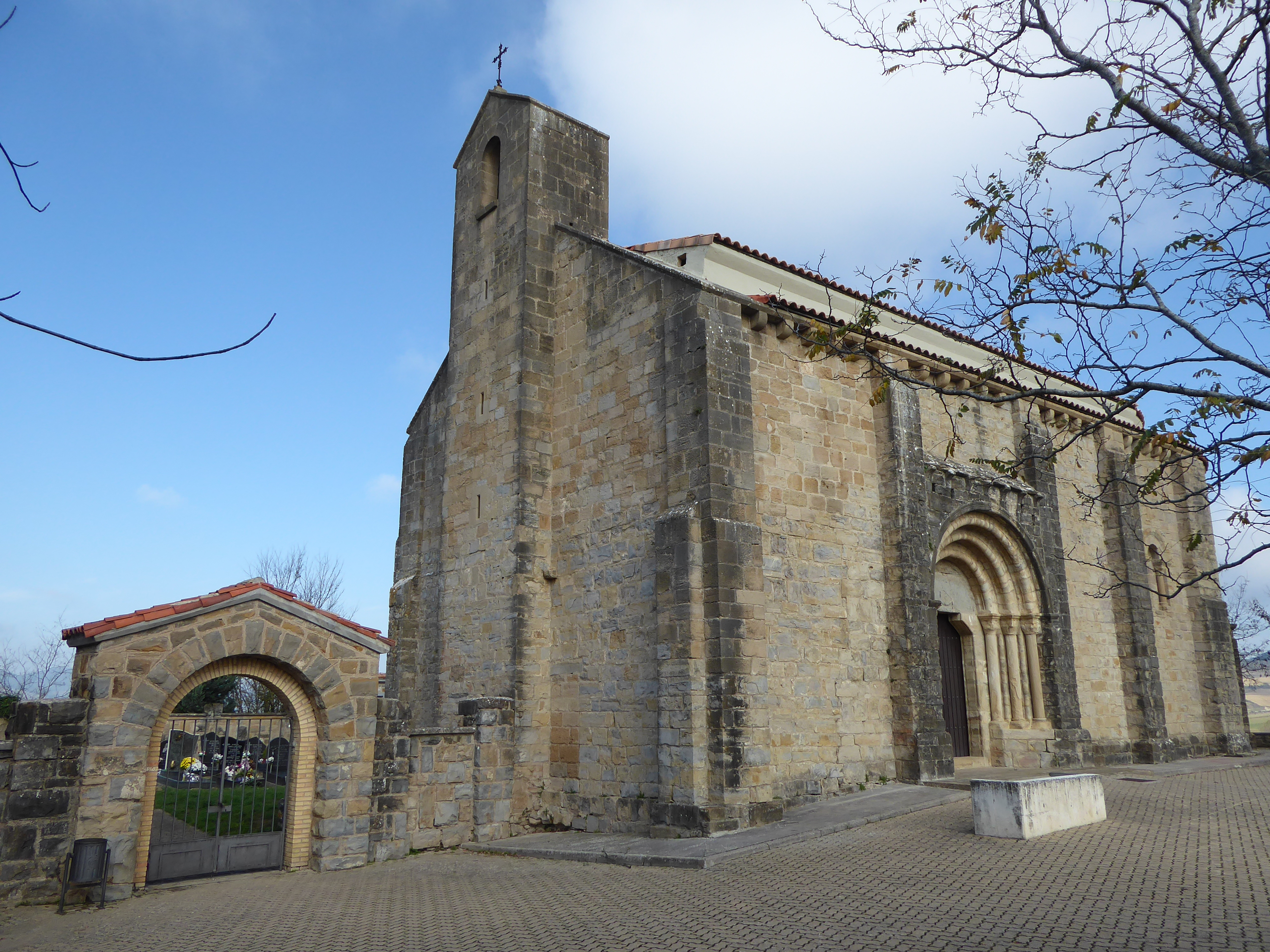

- Location within Navarre Location within Spain
- Coordinates: 42°47′55″N 1°35′42″W
- Country: Spain
- Community: Navarre
- Province: Navarre
- Municipality: Valle de Egüés
- Elevation: 490 m (1,610 ft)

Population
  - Total: 342

Badostáin is a locality and council located in the municipality of Valle de Egüés, in Navarre province, Spain, Spain. As of 2020, it has a population of 342.

== Geography ==
Badostáin is located 6 km (3.7 mi) east-southeast of Pamplona.
