= Ustárroz =

- Locality
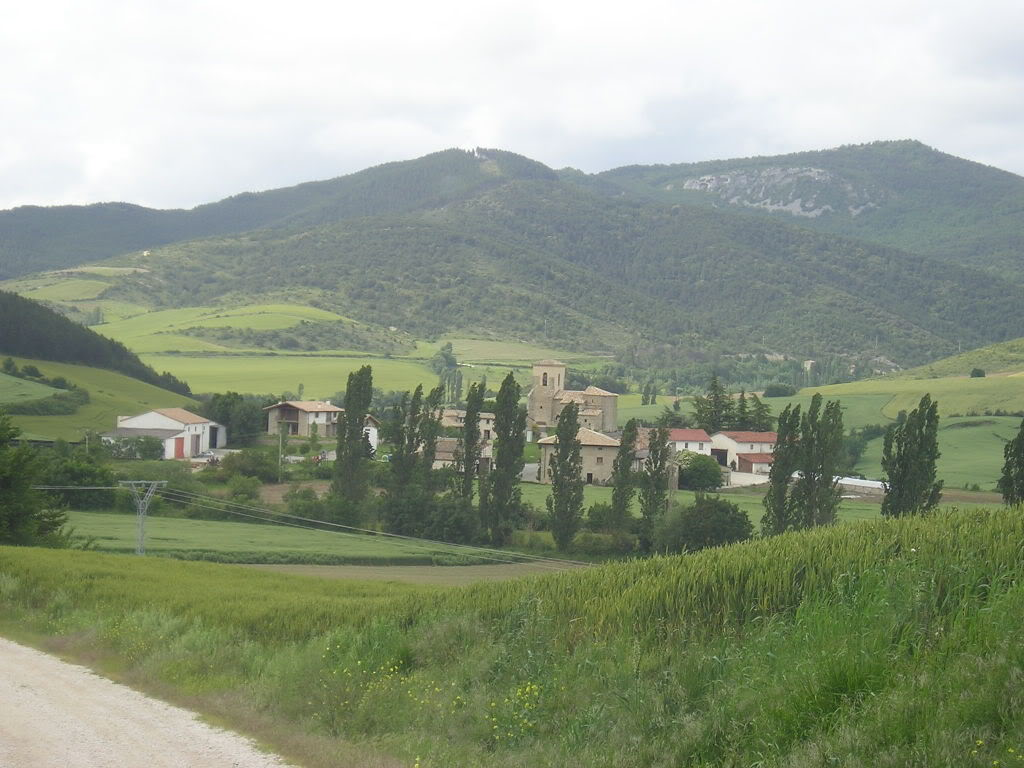

- Location within Navarre Location within Spain
- Coordinates: 42°48′52″N 1°31′13″W
- Country: Spain
- Community: Navarre
- Province: Navarre
- Municipality: Valle de Egüés
- Elevation: 559 m (1,834 ft)

Population
  - Total: 13

Ustárroz is a locality located in the municipality of Valle de Egüés, in Navarre province, Spain, Spain. As of 2020, it has a population of 13.

== Geography ==
Ustárroz is located 14km east of Pamplona.
