= Echálaz =

- Locality
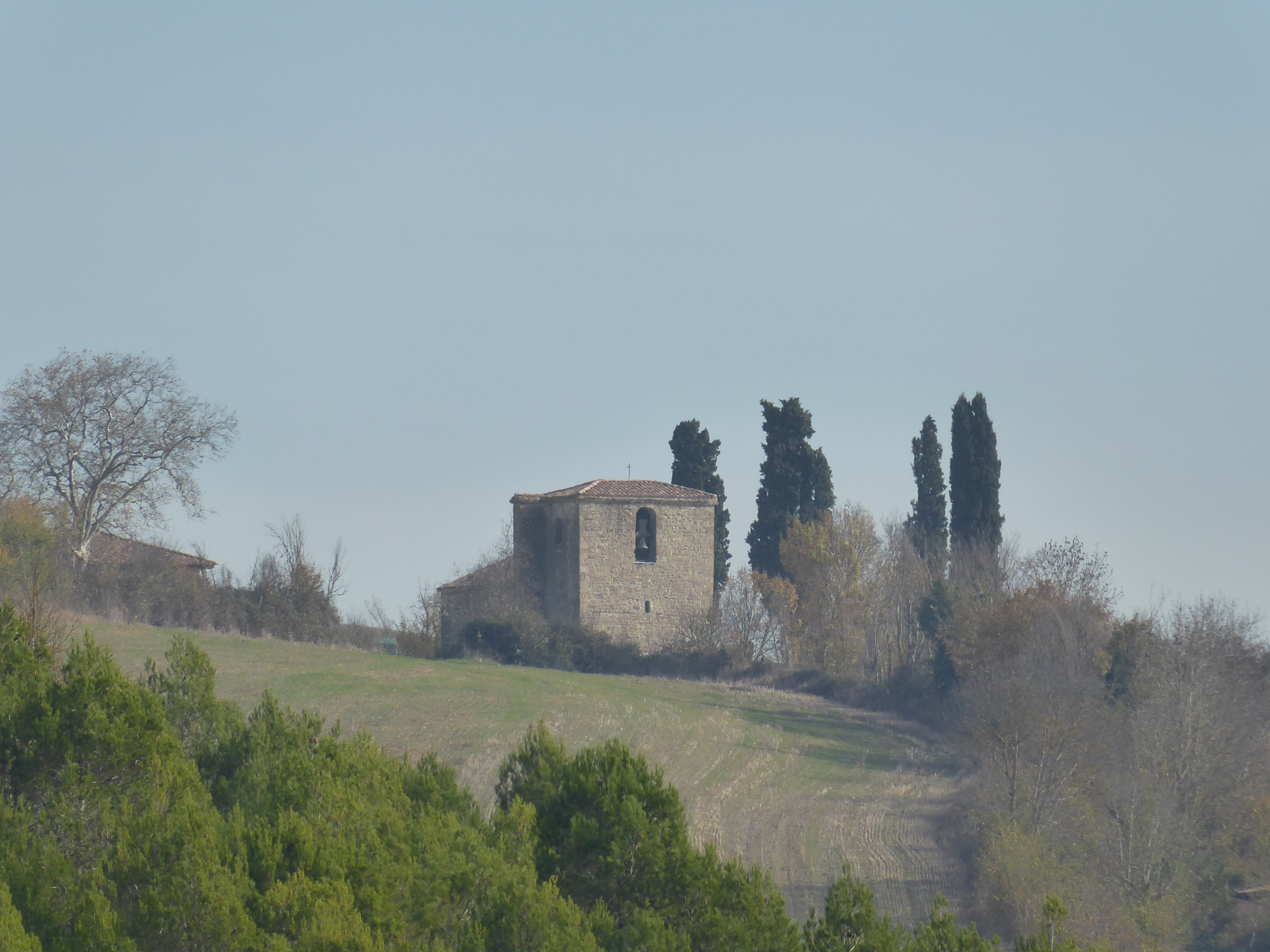

- Location within Navarre Location within Spain
- Coordinates: 42°50′0″N 1°31′23″W
- Country: Spain
- Community: Navarre
- Province: Navarre
- Municipality: Valle de Egüés
- Elevation: 553 m (1,814 ft)

Population
  - Total: 4

Echálaz is a locality located in the municipality of Valle de Egüés, in Navarre province, Spain, Spain. As of 2020, it has a population of 4.

== Geography ==
Echálaz is located 13km east-northeast of Pamplona.
