= Elcano, Navarre =

Elcano
- Council
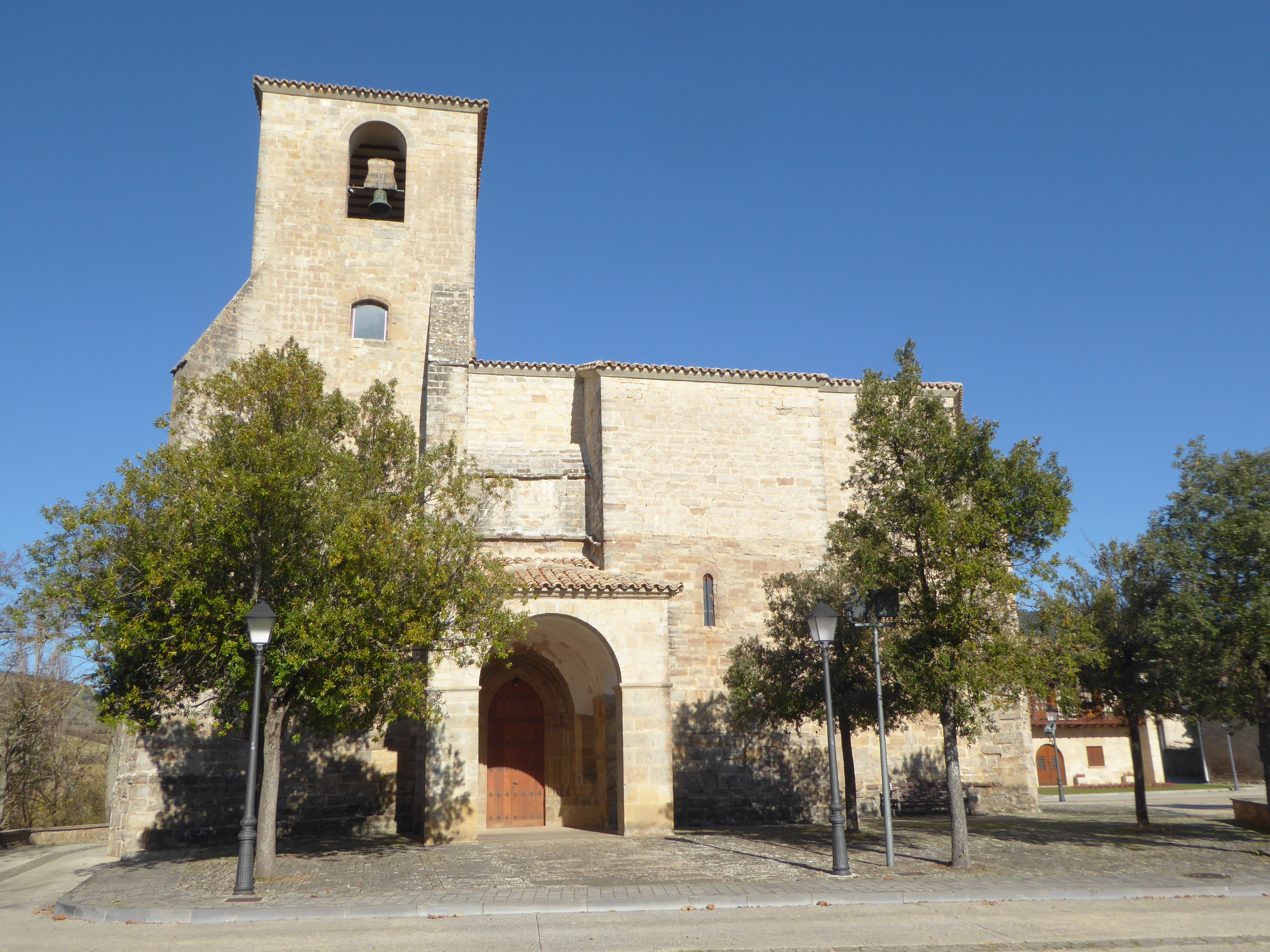

- Location within Navarre Location within Spain
- Coordinates: 42°49′52″N 1°32′46″W
- Country: Spain
- Community: Navarre
- Province: Navarre
- Municipality: Valle de Egüés
- Elevation: 529 m (1,736 ft)

Population
  - Total: 200

Elcano is a locality and council located in the municipality of Valle de Egüés, in Navarre province, Spain. As of 2020, it has a population of 200.

== Geography ==
Elcano is located 11km east-northeast of Pamplona.
