= Olaz (Valle de Egüés) =

- Council
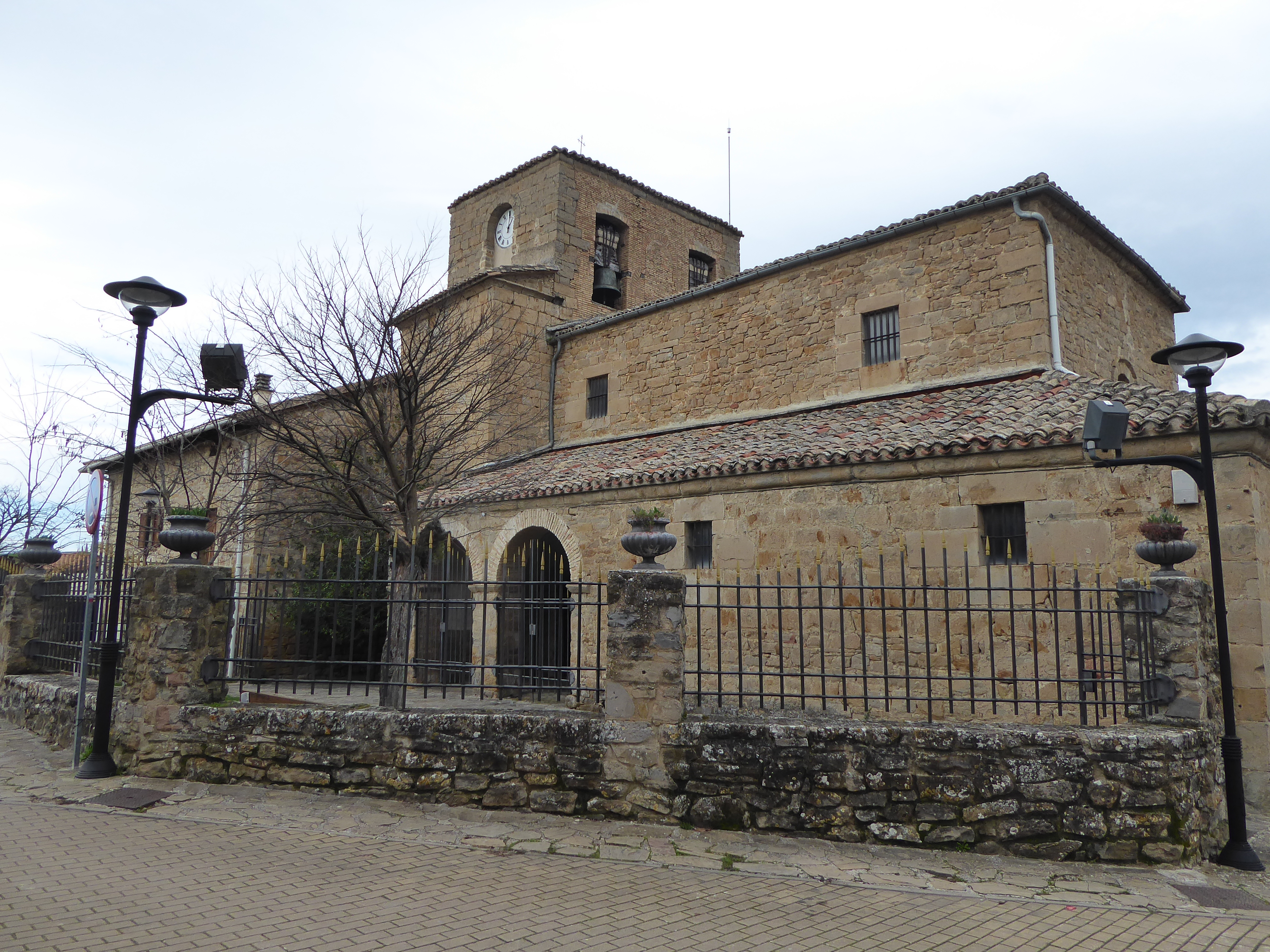

- Location within Navarre Location within Spain
- Coordinates: 42°49′14″N 1°35′16″W
- Country: Spain
- Community: Navarre
- Province: Navarre
- Municipality: Valle de Egüés
- Elevation: 455 m (1,493 ft)

Population
  - Total: 702

Olaz is a locality and council located in the municipality of Valle de Egüés, in Navarre province, Spain, Spain. As of 2020, it has a population of 702.

== Geography ==
Olaz is located 8km east of Pamplona.
