= Egulbati =

- Locality
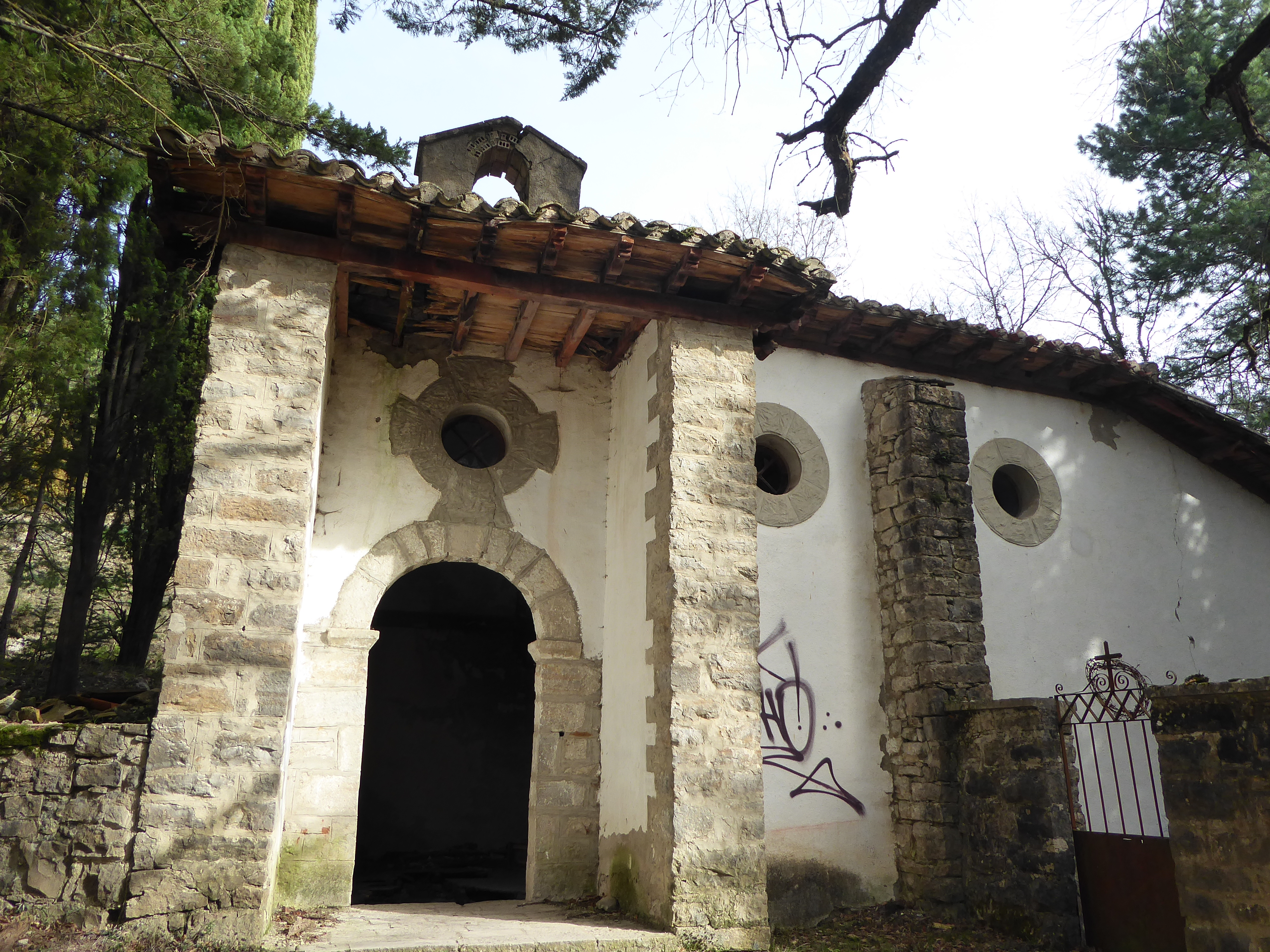

- Location within Navarre Location within Spain
- Coordinates: 42°51′26″N 1°32′8″W
- Country: Spain
- Community: Navarre
- Province: Navarre
- Municipality: Valle de Egüés
- Elevation: 651 m (2,136 ft)

Population
  - Total: 0

Egulbati is a locality located in the municipality of Valle de Egüés, in Navarre province, Spain. Since 1960, it has not been populated.

== Geography ==
Egulbati is located 14km east-northeast of Pamplona.
