= Eransus =

- Locality
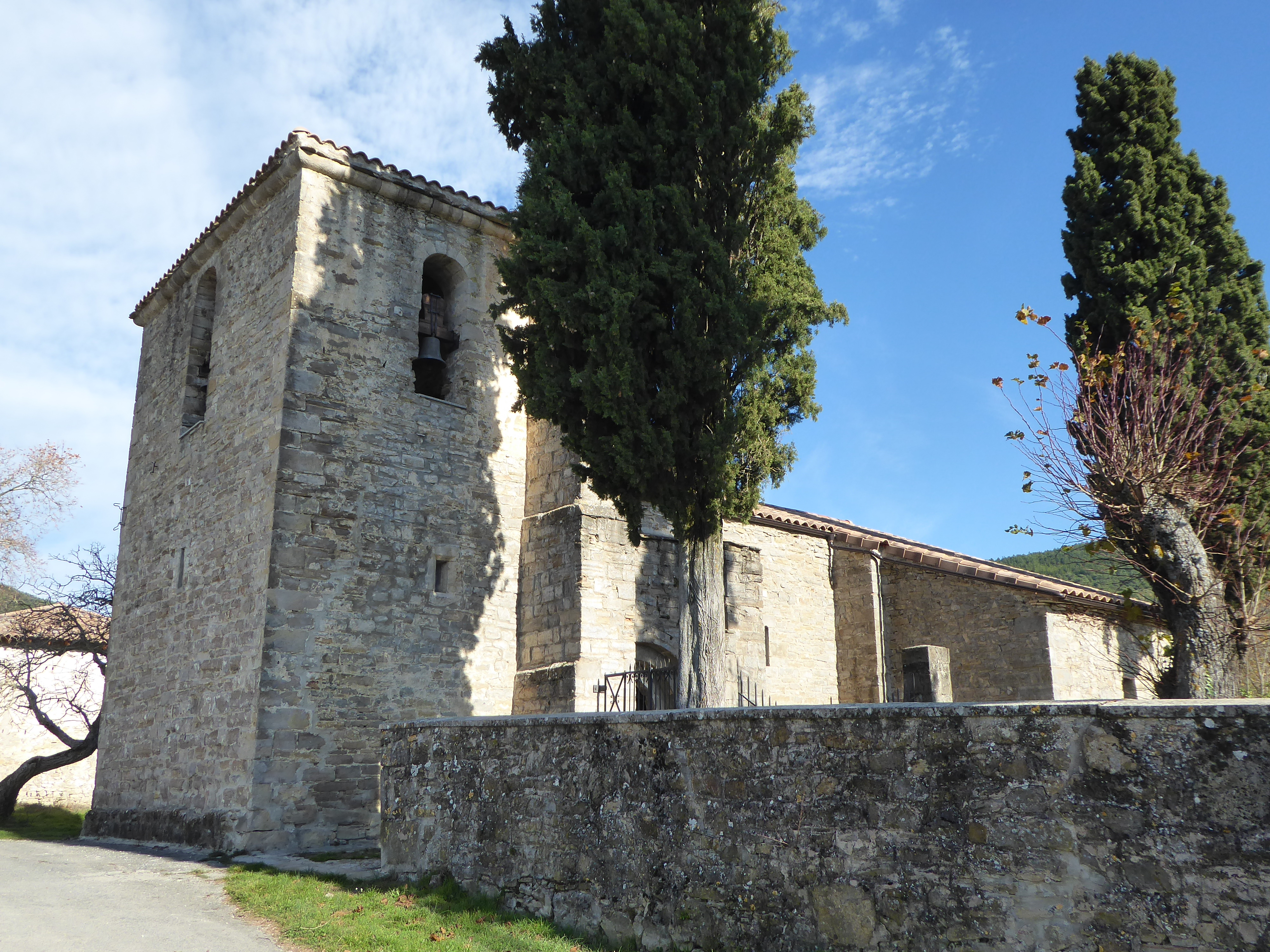

- Location within Navarre Location within Spain
- Coordinates: 42°49′42″N 1°30′37″W
- Country: Spain
- Community: Navarre
- Province: Navarre
- Municipality: Valle de Egüés
- Elevation: 610 m (2,000 ft)

Population
  - Total: 14

Eransus is a locality located in the municipality of Valle de Egüés, in Navarre province, Spain. As of 2020, it has a population of 14.

== Geography ==
Eransus is located 15km east of Pamplona.
