= Alzuza =

- Council
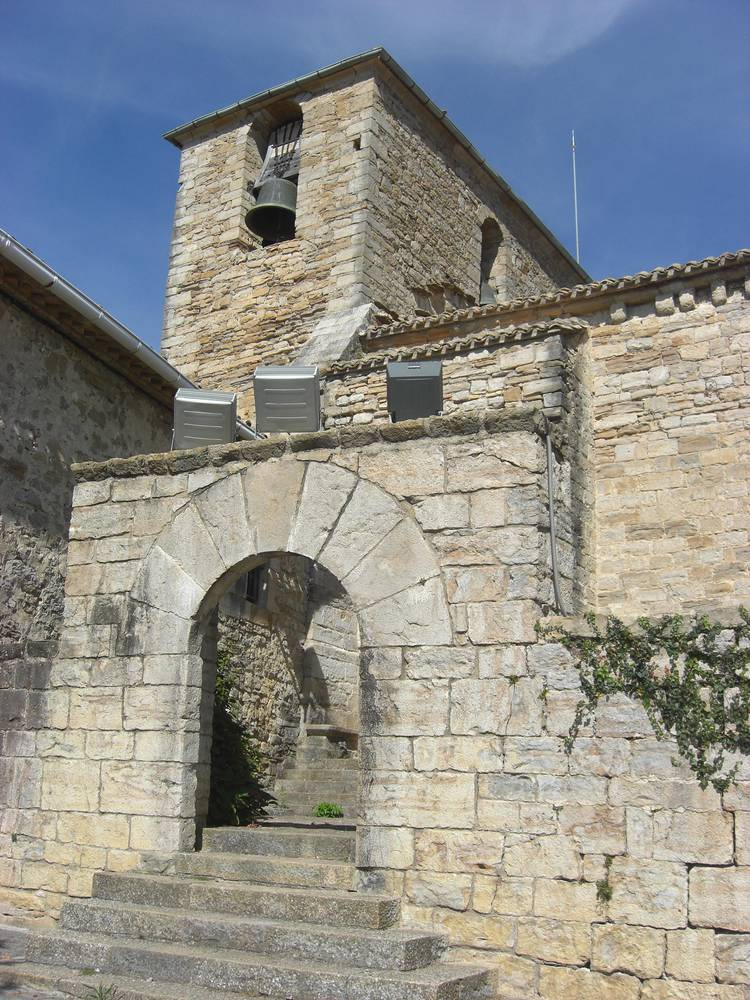

- Location within Navarre Location within Spain
- Coordinates: 42°50′21″N 1°33′58″W
- Country: Spain
- Community: Navarre
- Province: Navarre
- Municipality: Valle de Egüés
- Elevation: 596 m (1,955 ft)

Population
  - Total: 253

Alzuza is a locality and council located in the municipality of Valle de Egüés, in Navarre province, Spain, Spain. As of 2020, it has a population of 253.

== Geography ==
Alzuza is located 10km east-northeast of Pamplona.
