= Ibiricu =

- Council
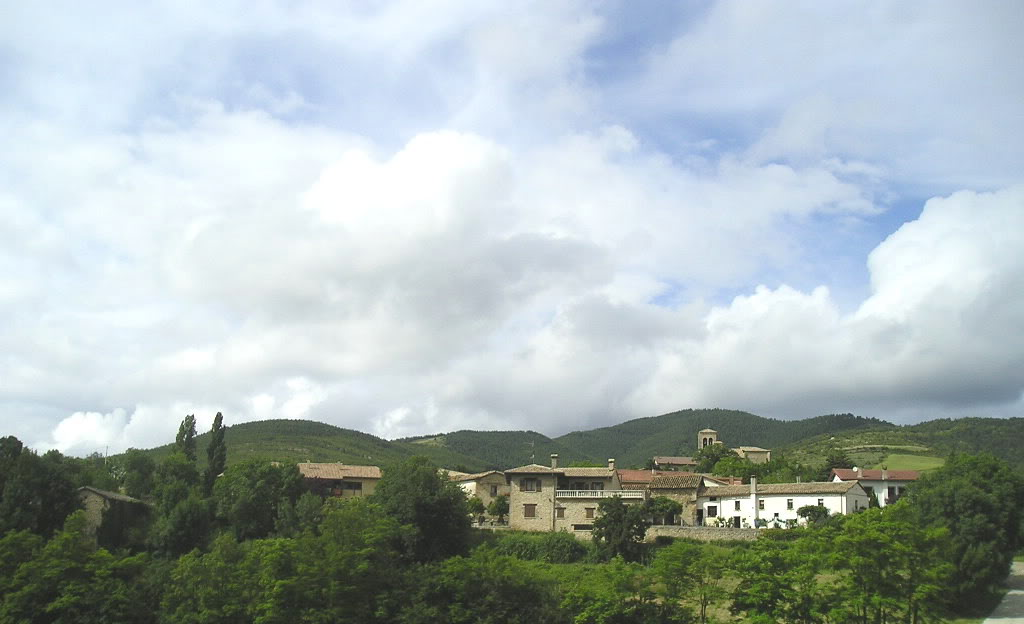

- Location within Navarre Location within Spain
- Coordinates: 42°49′39″N 1°32′20″W
- Country: Spain
- Community: Navarre
- Province: Navarre
- Municipality: Valle de Egüés
- Elevation: 514 m (1,686 ft)

Population
  - Total: 59

Ibiricu is a locality and council located in the municipality of Valle de Egüés, in Navarre province, Spain, Spain. As of 2020, it has a population of 59.

== Geography ==
Ibiricu is located 11km east of Pamplona.
