= Nafarroa Bai =

Nafarroa Bai Nafarroa Bai
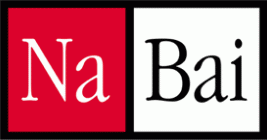
- Leader: collective leadership
- Founded: 2004
- Dissolved: 2011
- Succeeded by: Geroa Bai
- Headquarters: Plaza del Castillo 32 1º izq., Pamplona
- Ideology: Basque nationalism Separatism; Progressivism
- Political position: Big tent
- Colours: Red, White, Black

Website
- www.nafarroabai.org

Nafarroa Bai (Basque: Navarre Yes) was a Navarrese coalition in Spain of Basque nationalist and regional parties created in 2004 for the Spanish General election.

== History ==
The coalition comprised Aralar, the Basque Nationalist Party, Eusko Alkartasuna (Basque Solidarity), Batzarre, and local independents, but not the outlawed Basque nationalists of Batasuna or Accion Nacionalista Vasca (ANV), traditionally the Basque nationalist party in Navarre with strongest support, for its stance on ETA's violence.

All these parties usually ran by themselves competing with each other at elections held in the neighbouring autonomous community of the Basque country but agreed to run together in Navarre. Basque nationalism does not hold a majority there, and the move was aimed at optimizing the Basque nationalist electoral results in Navarre. The coalition came up third and won a seat in the Spanish Parliament in 2004, gaining 18.4% of the votes cast in Navarre.

In 2007 the coalition became the second largest political force in Navarre's autonomous parliament, virtually tied with the Spanish Socialist Workers' Party (PSN–PSOE) by obtaining 23.7% of the votes cast and 12 seats. Five of the seats belonged to Aralar, four to EA and one for each the PNV and Batzarre, another one is independent.

Its most significant politicians were Patxi Zabaleta (Aralar), Maiorga Ramírez (Eusko Alkartasuna) and Uxue Barkos, a respected journalist who had worked for the Basque Television. She was the coalition's only MP in the Spanish Parliament.

In the 2008 Spanish General Election, Nafarroa Bai repeated the results of 2004 (18.5%), again coming up third in the autonomous community and repeating its only seat in the Spanish Parliament.

By 2011, new parties and coalitions jumped onto the political scene on the eve of the votation campaign after tribunals in Madrid decided on their legalization. The coalition then broke up when Eusko Alkartasuna and Aralar left it, and the leftovers of the coalition revamped as Geroa Bai, this time participated only by PNV and other minor groups, and led by Uxue Barkos.

== Composition ==
Party
Basque Solidarity (EA)
Aralar (Aralar)
Basque Nationalist Party (EAJ/PNV)
Assembly (Batzarre)

== Electoral performance ==
=== Parliament of Navarre ===
Date	Votes			Seats		Status	Size
Date	#	%	±pp	#	±	Status	Size
2007	77,872	23.6%	+5.8	12 / 50	4	Opposition	2nd
2011	49,827	15.4%	–8.2	8 / 50	4	Opposition	3rd

=== Cortes Generales ===
==== Navarre ====
Congress of Deputies
Date	Votes			Seats		Status	Size
Date	#	%	±pp	#	±	Status	Size
2004	61,045	18.0%	+11.1	1 / 5	1	Opposition	3rd
2008	62,398	18.4%	+0.4	1 / 5	0	Opposition	3rd

Senate
Date	Seats		Size
Date	#	±	Size
2004	0 / 4	0	3rd
2008	0 / 4	0	3rd
