= Valle de Egüés =

Valle de Egüés / Egusesibar
- Municipality
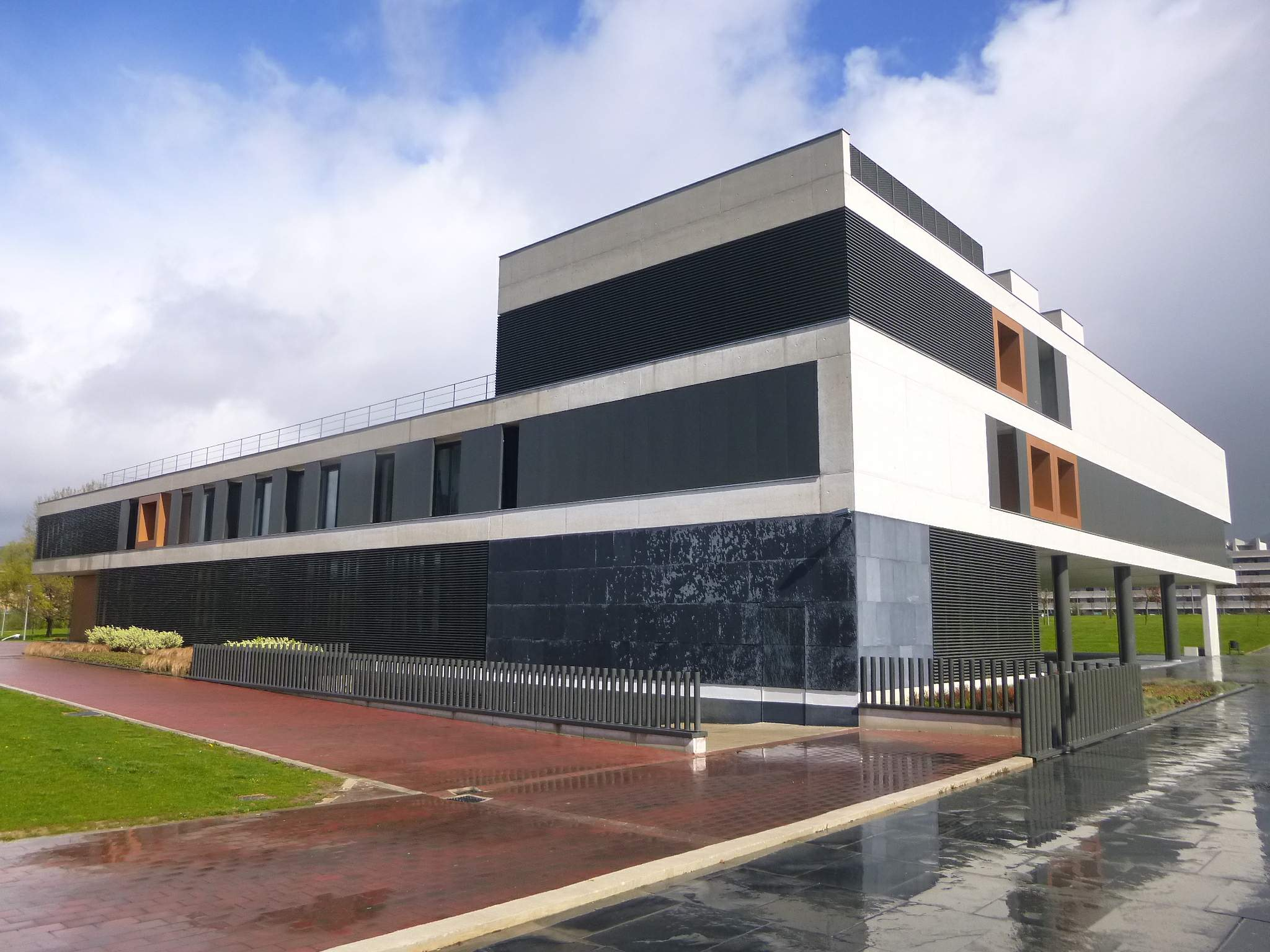
- Town hall

- Flag Coat of arms

- Location of Valle de Egüés within Navarre Location of Valle de Egüés within Spain
- Coordinates: 42°49′35″N 1°33′15″W
- Country: Spain
- Autonomous Community: Navarre
- Province: Navarre
- Comarca: Cuenca de Pamplona

Government
  - Mayor: José Antonio Mendive Rodríguez (UPN)

Area
  - Total: 53.5 km^{2} (20.7 sq mi)
- Elevation (AMSL): 503 m (1,650 ft)

Population (2025-01-01)
  - Total: 22,825
  - Density: 427/km^{2} (1,100/sq mi)
- Time zone: UTC+1 (CET)
  - Summer (DST): UTC+2 (CEST (GMT +2))
- Postal code: 31486
- Area code: +34 (Spain) + 948 (Navarre)
- Website: Town Hall

Valle de Egüés (Spanish: Valle de Egüés, Basque: Eguesibar) is a municipality of Navarre, Spain, in the metropolitan area of Pamplona. Its population is 19,014.

The valley comprises several settlements, some of them are actually suburbs of Pamplona and other completely rural villages. Some of them are seat of concejo, (Alzuza, Ardanaz, Azpa, Badostáin, Egüés, Elcano, Elía, Ibiricu, Olaz and Sagaseta), but others are just settlements without any administrative entity (Echálaz, Egulbati, Eransus, Gorráiz, Ustárroz and Sarriguren).

Gorraiz, Olaz, Alzuza, Egüés and partly also Badostain have grown as residential suburbs of single-family houses. Sarriguren is being developing as a residential suburb of apartment housing. There are also several industrial parks. Sarriguren is leading in Navarre the increasingly important sector of renewable energy technologies; it is seat of the National Center for Renewable Energies (CENER) and of Acciona Energía. The Museo Oteiza is in Alzuza.

Movistar Team, the direct descendant of Miguel Indurain's Banesto team, is based in Egüés.
