= 10th Parliament of Navarre =

Legislative meeting in Spain

←	9th	11th	→
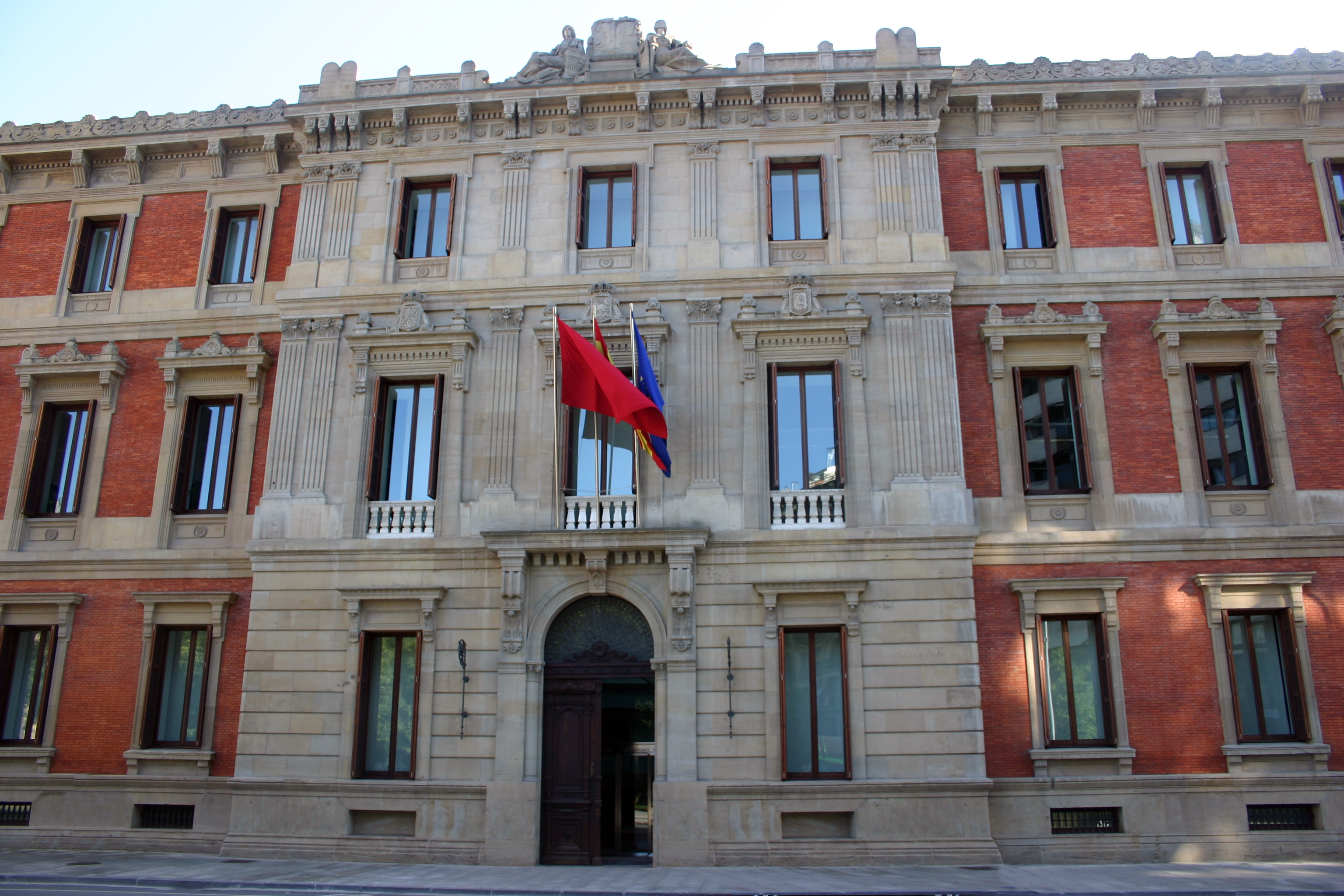

Overview
- Legislative body: Parliament of Navarre
- Meeting place: Parliament of Navarre Building
- Term: 19 June 2019 –
- Election: 26 May 2019
- Government: Chivite
- Website: parlamentodenavarra.es

Parliamentarians
- Members: 50
- President: Unai Hualde (GB)
- First Vice-President: Inmaculada Jurío (PSN)
- Second Vice-President: Yolanda Ibáñez (NA+)
- First Secretary: Juan Sánchez (NA+)
- Second Secretary: Maiorga Ramirez (EHB)

The 10th Parliament of Navarre is the current meeting of the Parliament of Navarre, the regional legislature of Navarre, with the membership determined by the results of the regional election held on 26 May 2019. The parliament met for the first time on 19 June 2019. According to the Statute of Autonomy of Navarre, the maximum legislative term of the parliament is 4 years.

== Election ==
The 10th Navarrese parliamentary election was held on 26 May 2019. It saw the newly-formed conservative Sum Navarre (NA+) alliance become the largest party in the parliament, but falling short of a majority.

Alliance	Votes	%	Seats	+/−
NA+	127,346	36.57	20	+3
PSN–PSOE	71,838	20.63	11	+4
GBai	60,323	17.32	9	±0
EH Bildu	50,631	14.54	7	–1
Podemos	16,518	4.74	2	–5
I–E (n)	10,472	3.01	1	–1
Others/blanks	11,065	3.18	0	±0
Total	348,193	100.00	50	±0

== History ==
The new parliament met for the first time on 19 June 2019 and after two rounds of voting Unai Hualde of Geroa Bai (GB) was elected President of the Parliament of Navarre with the support of the Socialist Party of Navarre (PSN), EH Bildu (EHB), Podemos-Ahal Dugu and Izquierda-Ezkerra (I-E).

Other members of the Bureau of the Parliament of Navarre were also elected on 19 June 2019: Inmaculada Jurío (PSN), First Vice-President; Yolanda Ibáñez (NA+), Second Vice-President; Juan Sánchez (NA+), First Secretary; Maiorga Ramirez (EHB), Second Secretary.

President
Candidate		Votes	
Candidate		Round 1	Round 2
Unai Hualde	GBai	16	30
Iñaki Iriarte	NA+	20	20
Inmaculada Jurío	PSN–PSOE	11	—
Blank ballots		3	0
Invalid ballots		0	0
Absentees		0	0
Total		50	50

Vice-President
Candidate		Votes
Inmaculada Jurío	PSN–PSOE	23
Yolanda Ibáñez	NA+	20
Blank ballots		7
Invalid ballots		0
Absentees		0
Total		50

Secretary
Candidate		Votes
Juan Sánchez	NA+	20
Maiorga Ramirez	EH Bildu	17
Ainhoa Unzu	PSN–PSOE	11
Blank ballots		2
Invalid ballots		0
Absentees		0
Total		50

== Government ==
After two rounds of voting, María Chivite (PSN) was elected President of Navarre on 2 August 2019 with the support of GB, Podemos and I-E, after EHB chose to abstain.

Investiture; María Chivite (PSN)
Ballot →	1 August 2019	2 August 2019
Required majority →	26 out of 50	Simple
Yes: • PSN (11); • GBai (9); • Podemos (2); • I–E (n) (1)	23 / 50	23 / 50
No: • NA+ (20); • EH Bildu (7) (2 on 2 Aug)	27 / 50	22 / 50
Abstentions: • EH Bildu (5) (on 2 Aug)	0 / 50	5 / 50
Absentees	0 / 50	0 / 50

== Members ==
Name	No.	Party	Alliance	Group	Took office	Left office	Notes
Manu Aierdi	5	EAJ-PNV	GBai	Geroa Bai	19 June 2019		
Marta Álvarez	6	UPN	NA+	NA+	19 June 2019		
Ramón Alzórriz	2	PSN		Socialists	19 June 2019		
Ángel Ansa	20	UPN	NA+	NA+	19 June 2019		
Adolfo Araiz	2	Sortu	EH Bildu	EH Bildu	19 June 2019		
Jabi Arakama	9	Zabaltzen	GBai	Geroa Bai	19 June 2019		
Isabel Aramburu	7	Zabaltzen	GBai	Geroa Bai	19 June 2019		
Miren Aranoa	6	EA	EH Bildu	EH Bildu	19 June 2019		
Mikel Asiain	8		GBai	Geroa Bai	19 June 2019		
Pablo Azcona	6		GBai	Geroa Bai	19 June 2019		
Laura Aznal	3		EH Bildu	EH Bildu	19 June 2019		
Ainhoa Aznarez	2		Podemos	Podemos	19 June 2019		
Uxue Barkos	1	Zabaltzen	GBai	Geroa Bai	19 June 2019		
María Biurrun	9	PSN		Socialists	19 June 2019		
Alberto Bonilla	13	Cs	NA+	NA+	19 June 2019		
Miguel Bujanda	16	UPN	NA+	NA+	19 June 2019		
Mikel Buil	1		Podemos	Podemos	19 June 2019		
María Chivite	1	PSN		Socialists	19 June 2019		
Bernardo Ciriza	6	PSN		Socialists	19 June 2019		
María de Simón	1	IUN-NEB	I-E	I-E	19 June 2019		
Jorge Esparza	8	UPN	NA+	NA+	19 June 2019		
José Javier Esparza	1	UPN	NA+	NA+	19 June 2019		
Patricia Fanlo	11	PSN		Socialists	19 June 2019		
Raquel Garbayo	14	UPN	NA+	NA+	19 June 2019		
Javier García	10	PPN	NA+	NA+	19 June 2019		
Maribel García	11	UPN	NA+	NA+	19 June 2019		
Carlos Gimeno	4	PSN		Socialists	19 June 2019		
Domingo González	7		EH Bildu	EH Bildu	19 June 2019		
Pedro González	12	UPN	NA+	NA+	19 June 2019		
Unai Hualde	2	EAJ-PNV	GBai	Geroa Bai	19 June 2019		President.
Yolanda Ibáñez	5	UPN	NA+	NA+	19 June 2019		Second Vice-President.
Cristina Ibarrola	7	UPN	NA+	NA+	19 June 2019		
Iñaki Iriarte	9	UPN	NA+	NA+	19 June 2019		
Inmaculada Jurío	3	PSN		Socialists	19 June 2019		First Vice-President.
Antonio Lecumberri	8	PSN		Socialists	19 June 2019		
María Llorente	19	Cs	NA+	NA+	19 June 2019		
Koldo Martinez	3	Zabaltzen	GBai	Geroa Bai	19 June 2019		
Nuria Medina	7	PSN		Socialists	19 June 2019		
Carlos Mena	10	PSN		Socialists	19 June 2019		
Isabel Olave	17	UPN	NA+	NA+	19 June 2019		
Patricia Perales	5		EH Bildu	EH Bildu	19 June 2019		
Francisco Pérez	18	UPN	NA+	NA+	19 June 2019		
Carlos Pérez-Nievas	3	Cs	NA+	NA+	19 June 2019		
Maiorga Ramirez	4	EA	EH Bildu	EH Bildu	19 June 2019		Second Secretary.
Bakartxo Ruiz	1	Sortu	EH Bildu	EH Bildu	19 June 2019		
Juan Sánchez	15	UPN	NA+	NA+	19 June 2019		First Secretary.
Maria Solana	4	EAJ-PNV	GBai	Geroa Bai	19 June 2019		
José Suárez	4	PPN	NA+	NA+	19 June 2019		
Ainhoa Unzu	5	PSN		Socialists	19 June 2019		
María Valdemoros	2	UPN	NA+	NA+	19 June 2019		
