= SNP Students =

Student wing of the Scottish National Party

- Leader: Jason Macmillan
- Treasurer: Peter Durkin
- Founded: 1961
- Membership: ▼5,100 (as of February 2024)
- Ideology: Scottish independence
- Mother party: Scottish National Party
- Website: Official website

SNP Students (also known as the Federation of Student Nationalists) is the student wing of the Scottish National Party (SNP), representing students in Scottish higher education. It was formed in 1961 when various student organisations supportive of Scottish independence and the SNP in particular decided to join forces into a new constituent body.

Unlike Young Scots for Independence, which is the youth wing of the SNP, the group is for those in higher education and membership is not restricted by age.

The organisation has branches at most of Scotland's universities, and regularly campaigns for independence and a host of other policies across the country.

== History ==
The organisation was formed in 1961 and key figures were Neil MacCormick and Allan Macartney who would both later become SNP members of the European Parliament. By 1975 the group had around 1,500 members in Scotland.

It has played an active part in the affairs of the SNP and is represented on the party's National Executive Committee, in the past with a representative position shared with the Young Scots for Independence, but now each organisation has its own representative. The SNP Students can send up to 15 delegates to the SNP Annual National Conference and 6 delegates to meetings of its National Council.

In the 2000 SNP leadership election the organisation supported Alex Neil who lost to John Swinney. In all subsequent leadership campaigns the organisation did not officially endorse any candidate.

It has informal links with Plaid Ifanc, the youth wing of Plaid Cymru. Until its September 2019 conference, it was also a part of the European Free Alliance Youth.

As of November 2021, they had a membership of 5,800 people who were at colleges and universities across Scotland.

== Activity ==
SNP Students has been very active in recent years, organising high-profile campaigns on issues such as Equal Marriage, zero-hour contracts and the stripping of charitable status from fee-paying schools.

In September 2008, during a debate at the University of Edinburgh, a student member stated that the SNP Students executive was opposed to the proposals from the SNP-led Scottish Government to raise the minimum purchase age for alcohol in off-sales from 18 to 21.

In 2012, during the SNP's policy change on NATO membership of an independent Scotland, SNP Students publicly came out in favour of retaining the anti-NATO policy, however at SNP conference the vote was lost despite SNP Students delegates voting against, and as a result the SNP is now pro-NATO.

At the SNP Students conference in 2015, they voted in favour of reintroducing rent controls in Scotland.

At the SNP Students conference in September 2019, SNP Students voted to disaffiliate from the European Free Alliance Youth, citing a fundamental disagreement with the ethos of the organisation and expressing the desire to build relationships with mainstream social democratic forces in Europe instead.

In 2019, SNP Students successfully campaigned for an end to graduation fees in Scotland, passing a resolution at the October 2019 SNP Conference calling on all universities in Scotland to abolish graduation fees.

During the COVID-19 pandemic in 2020, SNP Students campaigned with others for the introduction of a Summer SAAS, and a No Detriment Policy at Scotland's universities.

On 31 December 2020, the day the Brexit transition period ended, SNP Students published a co-authored statement with the Scottish Young Liberals, Scottish Labour Students, and the Scottish Young Greens, condemning the UK Government for Brexit and calling for Scotland to continue as a member of the Erasmus+ scheme.

In the SNP's manifesto for the 2021 Holyrood Election, the SNP committed to abolishing all core curriculum charges, implementing an SNP Students policy, pushed for at the 2020 National Conference. This came into effect on 14 July 2021.

At its 2021 National Conference on 25 September 2021, SNP Students unanimously passed a motion calling for the extension of free bus travel to all students at colleges and universities in Scotland.

== Organisation ==
The organisation is run by a National Executive Committee (NEC) elected each year at the SNP Students' Annual Conference. The committee currently comprises a Convener, Secretary, Treasurer, Organiser, Equalities Officer, Membership Secretary, and Social Media Officer.

Affiliated SNP and Yes societies with SNP Students:

- Glasgow University Scottish Nationalist Association
- Strathclyde University SNP Society
- Edinburgh University Yes Students for Independence
- St Andrews University Scottish Independence society

The organisation's main opponent among universities across Scotland is the democratic socialist Scottish Labour Students, which comprises nine university student organisations.
