= 9th Parliament of Navarre =

Legislative meeting in Spain

←	8th	10th	→
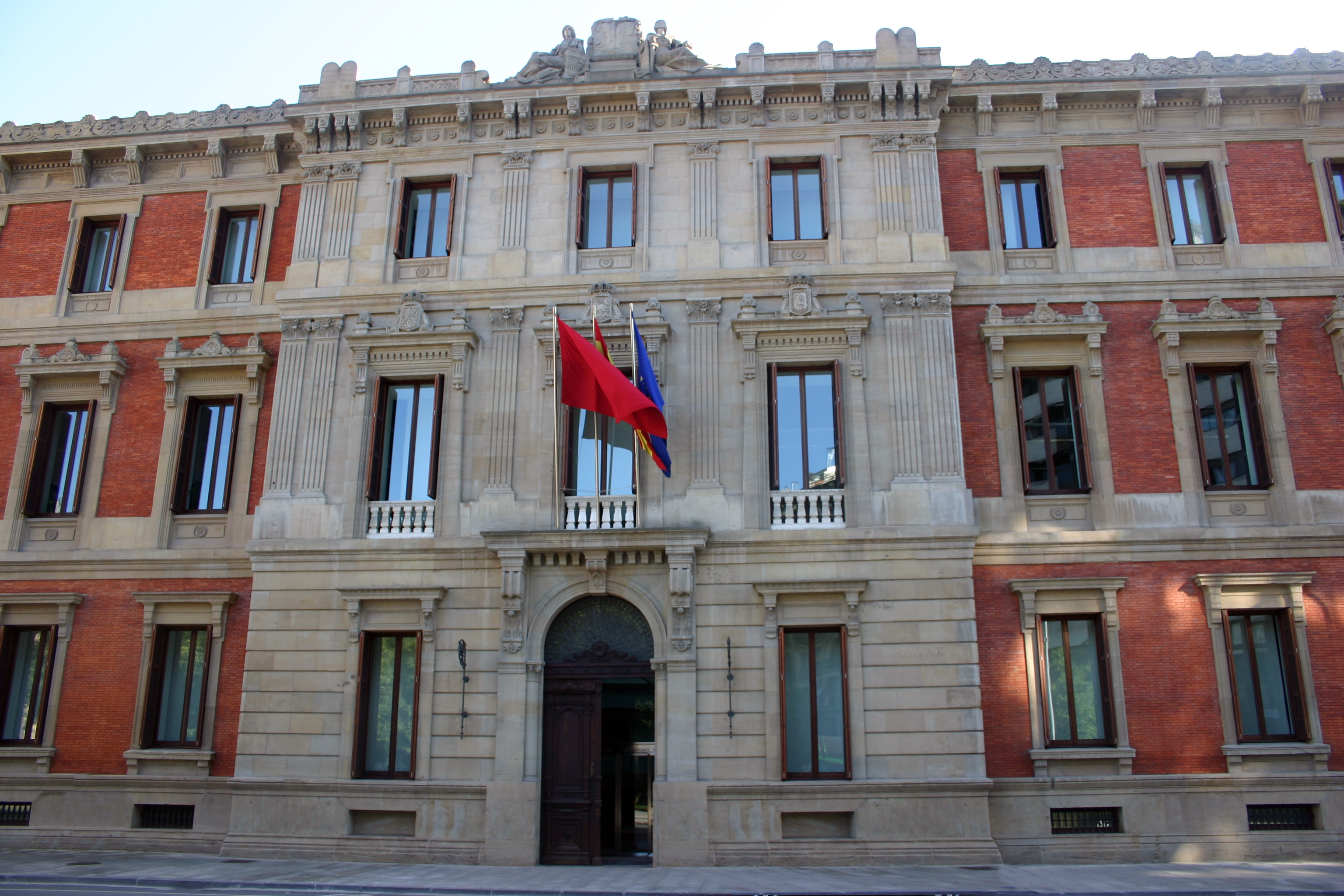

Overview
- Legislative body: Parliament of Navarre
- Meeting place: Parliament of Navarre Building
- Term: 17 June 2015 – 18 June 2019
- Election: 24 May 2015
- Government: Barkos
- Website: parlamentodenavarra.es

Parliamentarians
- Members: 50
- President: Ainhoa Aznarez (Podemos)
- First Vice-President: Unai Hualde (GB)
- Second Vice-President: Alberto Catalán (UPN) (15-19); Vacant (19)
- First Secretary: Maiorga Ramirez (EHB)
- Second Secretary: Óscar Arizcuren (UPN) (15-18); Maribel García (UPN) (18-19)

The 9th Parliament of Navarre was a meeting of the Parliament of Navarre, the regional legislature of Navarre, with the membership determined by the results of the regional election held on 24 May 2015. The parliament met for the first time on 17 June 2015.

== Election ==
The 9th Navarrese parliamentary election was held on 24 May 2015. At the election the conservative and unionist Navarrese People's Union (UPN) remained the largest party in the parliament but fell well short of a majority.

Alliance	Votes	%	Seats	+/–
Navarrese People's Union	92,705	27.44%	15	▼4
Geroa Bai	53,497	15.83%	9	▲1
EH Bildu	48,166	14.25%	8	▲1
Podemos-Ahal Dugu	46,207	13.67%	7	▲7
Socialist Party of Navarre	45,164	13.37%	7	▼2
People's Party of Navarre	13,289	3.93%	2	▼2
Izquierda-Ezkerra	12,482	3.69%	2	▼1
Others/blanks	26,385	7.81%	0	–
Total	337,895	100.00%	50	–

== History ==
The new parliament met for the first time on 17 June 2015 and elected Ainhoa Aznarez (Podemos) as President of the Parliament of Navarre.

Other members of the Bureau of the Parliament of Navarre were also elected on 17 June 2015: Unai Hualde (GB), First Vice-president; Alberto Catalán (UPN), Second Vice-president; Maiorga Ramirez (EHB), First Secretary; Óscar Arizcuren (UPN), Second Secretary.

President
Candidate	Alliance	Votes
Ainhoa Aznarez	Podemos	26
Blank		24
Null		0
Total		50

Vice-president
Candidate	Alliance	Votes
Unai Hualde	GB	26
Alberto Catalán	UPN	17
Inmaculada Jurío	PSN	7
Blank		0
Null		0
Total		50

Secretary
Candidate	Alliance	Votes
Maiorga Ramirez	EHB	26
Oscar Arizcuren	UPN	15
Nuria Medina	PSN	7
Javier García	PPN	2
Blank		0
Null		0
Total		50

Uxue Barkos (GB) was elected President of Navarre on 20 July 2015 with the support of the EH Bildu, Podemos-Ahal Dugu and Izquierda-Ezkerra.

President (Uxue Barkos)
	Votes
For	26
Against	17
Abstain	7
Absent	0
Total	50

Óscar Arizcuren (UPN) resigned as Second Secretary on 2 February 2018 after being appointed Director of Public Policies and Relations with Europe for Aeropuertos Españoles y Navegación Aérea (AENA). His replacement Maribel García (UPN) was elected on 8 February 2018.

Second Secretary
Candidate	Alliance	Votes
Maribel García	UPN	16
Ainhoa Unzu	PSN	7
Blank		25
Null		0
Total		48

== Deaths and resignations ==
The 9th parliament saw the following deaths and resignations:

- 27 July 2015 - Manu Aierdi (GB) resigned after being appointed First Vice President and Minister for Economic Development of Navarre. He was replaced by Consuelo Satrustegi (GB) on 29 July 2015.
- 13 August 2015 - Xabi Lasa (EHB) resigned after being appointed Director-General of Local Administration at the Department of Rural Development, Environment and Local Administration of Navarre. He was replaced by Aranzazu Izurdiaga (EHB) on 19 August 2015.
- 29 December 2015 - Eduardo Santos (Podemos) resigned after being elected to the Congress of Deputies. He was replaced by Rubén Velasco (Podemos) on 7 January 2016.
- 8 September 2016 - María Solana (GB) resigned after being appointed Spokesperson of the Government of Navarre. She was replaced by Rafael Eraso (GB) on 15 September 2016.
- 22 November 2016 - Fátima Andreo (Podemos) resigned. She was replaced by Fanny Carrillo (Podemos) on 5 December 2016.
- 4 September 2017 - Santos Cerdán (PSN) resigned. He was replaced by María Ruiz (PSN) on 13 September 2017.
- 15 June 2018 - Iñaki Iriarte (UPN) resigned. He was replaced by Mariano Herrero (UPN) on 21 June 2018.
- 24 September 2018 - Cristina Altuna (UPN) resigned. She was replaced by Francisco Irízar (UPN).
- 20 May 2019 - Carlos García (UPN), Concepción Ruiz (PSN) and Sergio Sayas (UPN) resigned after being elected to the Congress of Deputies. Alberto Catalán (UPN) resigned after being elected to the Senate of Spain.

== Members ==
Name	No.	Party	Alliance	Group	Took office	Left office	Notes
Manu Aierdi	2	EAJ-PNV	Geroa Bai	Geroa Bai	17 June 2015	27 July 2015	Replaced by Consuelo Satrustegi.
Virginia Alemán	5	Zabaltzen	Geroa Bai	Geroa Bai	17 June 2015	18 June 2019	
Cristina Altuna	8	UPN		UPN	17 June 2015	24 September 2018	Replaced by Francisco Irízar.
David Anaut	7	Sortu	EH Bildu	EH Bildu	17 June 2015	18 June 2019	
Fátima Andreo	7		Podemos	Podemos	17 June 2015	22 November 2016	Replaced by Fanny Carrillo.
Adolfo Araiz	1	Sortu	EH Bildu	EH Bildu	17 June 2015	18 June 2019	
Isabel Aramburu	6	Zabaltzen	Geroa Bai	Geroa Bai	17 June 2015	18 June 2019	
Miren Aranoa	2	EA	EH Bildu	EH Bildu	17 June 2015	18 June 2019	
Óscar Arizcuren	3	UPN		UPN	17 June 2015	18 June 2019	Second Secretary (15–18).
Ainhoa Aznarez	5		Podemos	Podemos	17 June 2015	18 June 2019	President.
Uxue Barkos	1	Zabaltzen	Geroa Bai	Geroa Bai	17 June 2015	18 June 2019	
Ana Beltrán	1	PPN		People's	17 June 2015	18 June 2019	
Mikel Buil	2		Podemos	Podemos	17 June 2015	18 June 2019	
Fanny Carrillo	9		Podemos	Podemos	5 December 2016	18 June 2019	Replaces Fátima Andreo.
Luis Casado	14	UPN		UPN	17 June 2015	18 June 2019	
Jokin Castiella	9	EAJ-PNV	Geroa Bai	Geroa Bai	17 June 2015	18 June 2019	
Alberto Catalán	6	UPN		UPN	17 June 2015	20 May 2019	Second Vice-president (15–19).
Santos Cerdán	2	PSN		Socialists	17 June 2015	4 September 2017	Replaced by María Ruiz.
María Chivite	1	PSN		Socialists	17 June 2015	18 June 2019	
Carlos Couso	4		Podemos	Podemos	17 June 2015	18 June 2019	
María de Simón	2	IUN-NEB	I-E	I-E	17 June 2015	18 June 2019	
Mónica Doménech	15	UPN		UPN	17 June 2015	18 June 2019	
Rafael Eraso	11		Geroa Bai	Geroa Bai	15 September 2016	18 June 2019	Replaces María Solana.
José Javier Esparza	1	UPN		UPN	17 June 2015	18 June 2019	
Asun Fernández de Garaialde	6	Aralar	EH Bildu	EH Bildu	17 June 2015	18 June 2019	
Begoña Ganuza	13	UPN		UPN	17 June 2015	18 June 2019	
Carlos García	12	UPN		UPN	17 June 2015	20 May 2019	
Javier García	2	PPN		People's	17 June 2015	18 June 2019	
Maribel García	4	UPN		UPN	17 June 2015	18 June 2019	Second Secretary (18–19).
Guzmán Garmendia	4	PSN		Socialists	17 June 2015	18 June 2019	
Carlos Gimeno	6	PSN		Socialists	17 June 2015	18 June 2019	
Mariano Herrero	17	UPN		UPN	21 June 2018	18 June 2019	Replaces Iñaki Iriarte.
Unai Hualde	4	EAJ-PNV	Geroa Bai	Geroa Bai	17 June 2015	18 June 2019	First Vice-president.
Iñaki Iriarte	7	UPN		UPN	17 June 2015	15 June 2018	Replaced by Mariano Herrero.
Francisco Irízar	18	UPN		UPN	3 October 2018	18 June 2019	Replaces Cristina Altuna.
Aranzazu Izurdiaga	9	Sortu	EH Bildu	EH Bildu	19 August 2015	18 June 2019	Replaces Xabi Lasa.
Inmaculada Jurío	3	PSN		Socialists	17 June 2015	18 June 2019	
Esther Korres	8	EA	EH Bildu	EH Bildu	17 June 2015	18 June 2019	
Xabi Lasa	3		EH Bildu	EH Bildu	17 June 2015	13 August 2015	Replaced by Aranzazu Izurdiaga.
Patxi Leuza	8	Zabaltzen	Geroa Bai	Geroa Bai	17 June 2015	18 June 2019	
Koldo Martinez	3	Zabaltzen	Geroa Bai	Geroa Bai	17 June 2015	18 June 2019	
Nuria Medina	7	PSN		Socialists	17 June 2015	18 June 2019	
José Miguel Nuin	1		I-E	I-E	17 June 2015	18 June 2019	
Laura Pérez	1		Podemos	Podemos	17 June 2015	18 June 2019	
Maiorga Ramirez	5	EA	EH Bildu	EH Bildu	17 June 2015	18 June 2019	First Secretary.
Bakartxo Ruiz	4	Sortu	EH Bildu	EH Bildu	17 June 2015	18 June 2019	
Concepción Ruiz	9	PSN		Socialists	13 September 2017	18 June 2019	Replaces Santos Cerdán.
María Sáez	3		Podemos	Podemos	17 June 2015	18 June 2019	
Ana San Martín	2	UPN		UPN	17 June 2015	18 June 2019	
Juan Sánchez	5	UPN		UPN	17 June 2015	18 June 2019	
Eduardo Santos	6		Podemos	Podemos	17 June 2015	29 December 2015	Replaced by Rubén Velasco.
Consuelo Satrústegui	10	AT	Geroa Bai	Geroa Bai	29 July 2015	18 June 2019	Replaces Manu Aierdi.
Sergio Sayas	11	UPN		UPN	17 June 2015	20 May 2019	
María Segura	9	UPN		UPN	17 June 2015	18 June 2019	
Maria Solana	7	EAJ-PNV	Geroa Bai	Geroa Bai	17 June 2015	8 September 2016	Replaced by Rafael Eraso.
Ainhoa Unzu	5	PSN		Socialists	17 June 2015	18 June 2019	
Rubén Velasco	8		Podemos	Podemos	7 January 2016	18 June 2019	Replaces Eduardo Santos.
Luis Zarralugui	10	UPN		UPN	17 June 2015	18 June 2019	
