= Young Patriots =

Young Patriots may refer to the following groups:

- Young Patriots (Basque Country), Gazte Abertzaleak, the youth wing of the Basque political party Eusko Alkartasuna (EA) in Spain
- Congrès Panafricain des Jeunes et des Patriotes, a pro-government youth movement in Côte d'Ivoire
- Young Patriots Organization, an American left-wing political organization of the 1960s and 70s
