= Pello Urizar =

Spanish politician

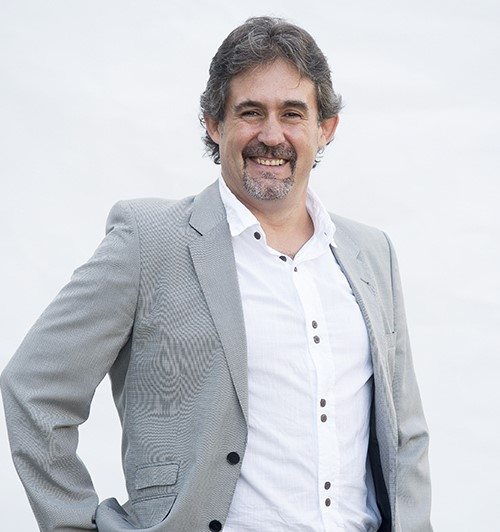
Portrait of Pello Urizar

Pello Urizar Karetxe (born 1968 in Mondragón, Guipúzcoa) is a Basque politician who is the Secretary General of Eusko Alkartasuna, the Basque nationalist and social-democratic political party operating in Spain and France, and a member of the Basque Parliament.

== Education ==
By training, Urizar is an electronic engineer.

== Professional career ==
He works at a cooperative.

== Activism ==
He has been affiliated with EA since its founding in 1986. In his early years he belonged to Gazte Abertzaleak, the youth wing of EA.

In 1995–97 he was a member of the city council of Mondragón. From 1996 to 1998 he was Secretary General of GA as well as a member of EA's National Executive. From 2000 to 2009 he was a member of the Regional Executive of Guipúzcoa. In the 2007 elections he was again elected to the city council of Mondragón.

At the EA's national convention held on June 20–21, 2009, in Vitoria, he was elected Secretary General of EA by acclamation. His position on Basque independence was that it should be achieved by "democratic and peaceful" means. Urizar's proposal for collaboration among Basque nationalist forces was ratified at the EA Political Conference in San Sebastián on November 21, 2009.

In October 2012, Urizar, standing for the EH Bildu party, was elected to represent Guipúzcoa in the Basque Parliament. He took office on November 20, 2012.

At the 2013 EA convention in Barañain, he was re-elected Secretary General of EA.

In June 2014, El Mundo ran a piece by J.M. Alonso accusing Urizar of being two-faced, the complaint being that during his time as Secretary General of EA he had threatened a local party operative with disciplinary sanctions for failing to comply with his directives, even though Urizar, during his own time as a civic official, had rebelled against party higher-ups.

In a speech delivered at a February 2017 plenary in Vitoria, Urizar called for unilateral action to bring about Basque independence, saying that the Spanish government had suppressed the rights of the people and that leaders of the Catalan independence movement were already symbols of freedom and would shortly become martyrs.

At the June 3–4, 2017, EA convention, held in San Sebastián, he was re-elected Secretary General, defeating opponent Maiorga Ramírez by a margin of 14 votes.

In September 2018, Urizar proposed that a future Basque government, based in Euskadi, be modeled on the government of Navarre under President Uxue Barkos.

== Personal life ==
He is the father of two children.
