= Student wing =

Allied front of a larger organization formed to gain support from students

A student wing is a subsidiary, autonomous, or independently allied front of a larger organization that is formed in order to rally support from students and focus on student specific issues, typically of those attending college or university. Student wings may also be discussion forums for student members and supporters of the organization to debate policy and ideology. In countries which permit political party representation in students' representative councils, student wings of political parties may nominate and campaign for candidates in student elections.

== In the United Kingdom ==
Most of the mainstream political parties in the UK have student wings, including Labour Students, Plaid Ifanc, SNP Students, and UKIP Students. Parent parties have historically restructured and rebranded student wings in an attempt to suppress and distance the main party from radical and activist elements in the student wings.

== Distinctions ==
=== From youth wings ===
Student wings are distinct from youth wings, as the former is not necessarily established on a young-general basis.

=== From political factions ===
Student wings are not normally considered as factions of a political party, as student wings are usually intended as student-focused extensions of party policy and ideology rather than being differently ideologised from the leadership of the party proper.

== See also ==
- LGBT wing
- Women's wing
- Youth wing
