= Plaid Ifanc =

Youth wing of Plaid Cymru, a Welsh party

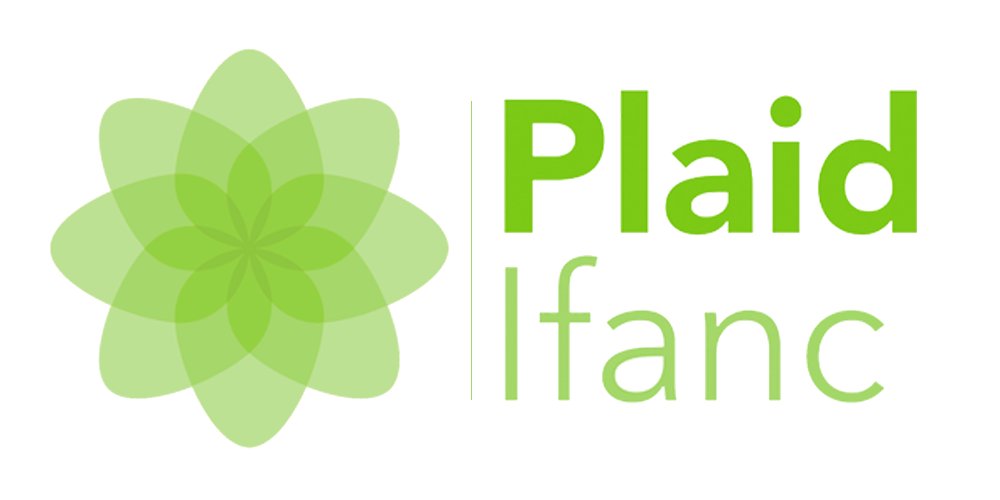
- Founded: 2005
- Headquarters: Cardiff, Wales
- Ideology: Welsh independence Welsh republicanism
- Mother party: Plaid Cymru
- European affiliation: European Free Alliance Youth
- Website: plaidifanc.squarespace.com

Plaid Ifanc (Welsh for 'young party' / 'young Plaid') is the youth and student wing of Plaid Cymru, a political party in Wales, and one of the seven official sections of the party.

== Origins ==
CymruX (the predecessor organisation of Plaid Cymru Youth) was founded in 2005 to merge Plaid Cymru's two existing movements into one new youth movement. The student federation and the youth movement were merged to create a brand new youth organisation available to anyone under the age of 30. A number of Young Plaid Cymru members wanted to create a vibrant new movement which would appeal to all young people in Wales. The members felt it important that young people of all ages should be able to take part in the political process together, without a separate movement only for students. This opened up the movement to more people, for example, young people in Wales who are working, and school pupils.

In 2012 CymruX was re-branded as Plaid Cymru Youth / Plaid Cymru Ifanc. In 2017, it was re-branded as Plaid Ifanc.

== Structure ==
Plaid Ifanc is run by its National Executive Committee, elected during its National Conference every year, which is usually held in the Spring. At community level, the movement is made up of local groups across Wales, known as branches. There are currently Plaid Ifanc branches in Cardiff, Islwyn, Caerphilly, Cardiff University, Swansea, Bangor, Newport, Pwllheli, Caernarfon, Pembrokeshire, Anglesey, Aberystwyth and Neath, which are in turn run by their own committees. However, in 2016/17, no branch existed in Aberystwyth University because of the absence of the group's executive during mandatory training sessions. The branch has been relaunched following Ben Lake's victory in the United Kingdom general election, 2017. Each branch sends two representatives to Plaid Ifanc's National Council, which meets 3 times a year, although the activities of the National Council were largely suspended between 2020-2022 as a result of the coronavirus pandemic. Each branch must comprise a minimum of three elected officers, chosen by all Plaid Ifanc members within the branch at an Annual General Meeting; these include a Chair, a Secretary, and at least one other officer. It is expected that at least one of these officers be a self-defining woman or genderqueer person.

Every member of Plaid Ifanc is entitled to vote or stand as an officer of the National Executive Committee during the National Conference. Terms of the NEC run for one year between National Conferences, and co-option processes exist to fill interim vacancies of the NEC.

Plaid Ifanc operates a strict equality policy, in order to maintain a diverse structure. According to Plaid Ifanc's Constitution, adopted at the Cardiff National Conference in 2016, at least 3 officers of the National Executive Committee must be women; this is in addition to the Women's Officer and at least one Co-Chair. One of the Co-Chairs of the movement must also be a woman, and branches are also expected to have at least one woman on their committees (which usually comprise three members). Following the 2022 National Conference, the constitution was amended such that at least one third of all NEC members must be either a self-defining woman or a genderqueer person. It remains the case that the Women's Officer must be a self-defining woman, and that at least one Co-Chair must be either a self-defining woman or a genderqueer person.

== Beliefs ==
As the Plaid Cymru youth wing, Plaid Ifanc shares many of the wider party's goals. However they aim as a youth wing to abide by the beliefs of their young members. At its 2015 National Conference in Aberystwyth, it adopted the following principles:

1. National Liberation. The main aim of Plaid Ifanc is to fight for independence for Wales as a full member-state of a democratic, social and united European Union.
2. Republicanism. We believe every citizen should be completely equal and that every layer of our government should be elected democratically. We believe in creating a Welsh Republic that is fully democratic.
3. A Strong Democracy. We want Wales to be a nation where all citizens, from 16 years old onwards, are able to vote and contribute fully to our democratic structures. We campaign for a fully proportional electoral system where all votes count.;
4. Social Justice. We believe that all in our society should be able to contribute to and depend on a strong and efficient welfare state to protect them where needs be.
5. Work and Employment. All young people have the right to employment that pays a decent living wage.
6. Free Education. Education is a human right, and we believe that the state should fund the education from the nursery school to the university. We have formed a central part of many campaigns to scrap tuition fees and in favour of free education. Building an engaged and intelligent society is important in creating a mature democracy.
7. Rights. Plaid Ifanc is a feminist organisation. We work to construct a society free from patriarchy and we fight for equal rights for LGBT people. We condemn all effort to degrade those who belong to a certain minority, be that ethnic or sexual, and we strive towards a tolerant society free of prejudice.
8. Welsh Language. We believe in building a truly bilingual society where everybody has the right to use the Welsh language. Welsh deserves a truly equal status in Wales and all school pupils and students should have the opportunity to learn our national language fluently.
9. Transport. Wales is the only country in Europe without a single kilometer of electrified railway, yet the private companies who run them make them amongst the most expensive in Europe. We campaign for an efficient transport system which quickly connects the communities of our nation. We also support reduced tariffs for young people.
10. The Environment. We must move our society towards a carbon neutral economy and we have a strong and important role to play to protect our territory from the monopoly of large mining companies and the royal family.

== Activities ==
Plaid Ifanc has campaigned against university top-up fees, the Iraq War, and the development of new nuclear arms, for the re-introduction of grants for university students, for affordable housing for young people, votes at 16 and for a Yes vote in the 2011 Welsh devolution referendum. More recently they have launched multiple campaigns, including a beer mat campaign based on consent ("All women have the right to say no"), where beer mats with the message are distributed in pubs. The #FreeWales or #CymruRydd campaign, which aims to make the movement's desire for Welsh independence more visible on the street with stickers, is also ongoing. The Co-Operation Agreement signed between the Welsh Government and Plaid Cymru in 2021 included a commitment to provide free school meals to all primary school children in Wales, a policy that had been adopted by Plaid Cymru following consistent campaigning by Plaid Ifanc. Other policies adopted at Plaid Ifanc National Conferences that have received support from local governments, police forces, and the Welsh Government include means of tackling period poverty and the argument for the decriminalisation of cannabis.

Plaid Ifanc has strong links with Gazte Abertzaleak, the youth wing of Eusko Alkartasuna from the Basque Country, whose members are regularly invited to participate in Plaid Ifanc's events (and vice versa). It has recently forged links with Young Republican Left of Catalonia, Young Scots for Independence, Ógra Shinn Féin in Ireland, Galiza Nova in Galicia, Joves PV in the Valencian Country, and the youth of Unvaniezh Demokratel Breizh from Brittany. It is a member of the European Free Alliance Youth.

In early 2022, Plaid Ifanc has taken part in a number of protests including Wales Is Not For Sale protest by Cymdeithas yr Iaith Gymraeg and the Cost of Living Crisis rally in Cardiff where they protested alongside Plaid MS's Sioned Williams and Heledd Fychan.

Further in 2022, Plaid Ifanc has renewed its beer mat campaign based on sexual consent, with the message updated to declare that "Everyone has the right to say no." They have also begun work with organisations such as Zero Hour, which campaigns for net-zero emissions and a nature-positive society across the UK, Shelter Cymru, which aims to provide secure housing to everyone in Wales, and Papyrus, which works to reduce youth suicide across the UK. At the 2022 Plaid Cymru Spring Conference in Cardiff, Plaid Ifanc hosted a panel discussion concerning youth empowerment in Wales, which included, alongside Officers of the NEC, a Member of the Senedd (Delyth Jewell), a Member of the Welsh Youth Parliament, and a representative from Shelter Cymru.

Following its 2022 National Conference at Wrecsam Glyndŵr University in Wrexham, Plaid Ifanc took further steps towards its goals of equality and minority representation by electing its first-ever Equalities Officer to the NEC, taking the place of its Membership Officer. Since August 2021, Plaid Ifanc has also elected Regional Representatives for North Wales, South Wales East, and South Wales West to its NEC to represent the interests of members in different parts of Wales, and to help branches work together.

== National Executive Committee 2026–2028 ==
The current National Executive Committee was elected in June 2026, consisting of 13 Officers. The 2022 election saw the election of the first Equalities Officer, the abolition of the role of the Membership Officer, and the first full-term election of Regional Representatives, previously elected in by-elections in August 2021. In June 2026 the Education Officer was elected for the first time and the Membership Officer position was reinstated.

Executive position	Officer
Co-Chair	Elliw Mair
Co-Chair	Taylor Reynolds
Secretary	Tomos Stokes
Treasurer	Siôn Dafydd
Education Officer	Ishmam Ahmed
Membership Officer	Jamie Wrake
Communications Officer	Taylor Reynolds
Women's Officer	Eve Scourfield
Campaigns Officer	Jac Jolly
Equalities Officer	Émile Chapin
International Officer	Aaron Clwyd Jones
North Wales Regional Representative	Cai Jones
South West Wales Regional Representative	Daisy Davies
South East Wales Regional Representative	Tomos Stokes

== List of chairs ==
Former national chairs	Years
Elliw Mair & Taylor Reynolds	2026-Present
Joshua Declan McCarthy	2024–2025
Brandon Ham	2023–2024
Luned-Mair Barratt	2022–2025
Shane C. Parsons	2022–2023
Gwenno Huws	2021–2022
Sioned James	2019–2021
Morgan Bowler-Brown	2019–2022
Sioned Treharne	2017–2019
Fflur Arwel	2018–2019
Emyr Gruffydd	2016–2018
Aled Morgan Hughes	2015–2016
Glenn Page	2014–2015
Charlotte Britton	2013–2014
Cerith Rhys Jones	2012–2013
Lleu Williams	2011–2012
Luke James	2010–2011
Caryl Wyn Jones	2009–2010
Ivor Rees	2006–2009
Ellen Lyn Roberts	2005–2006
