= Mertxe Aizpurua =

Spanish journalist (born 1960)

Mertxe Aizpurua MP
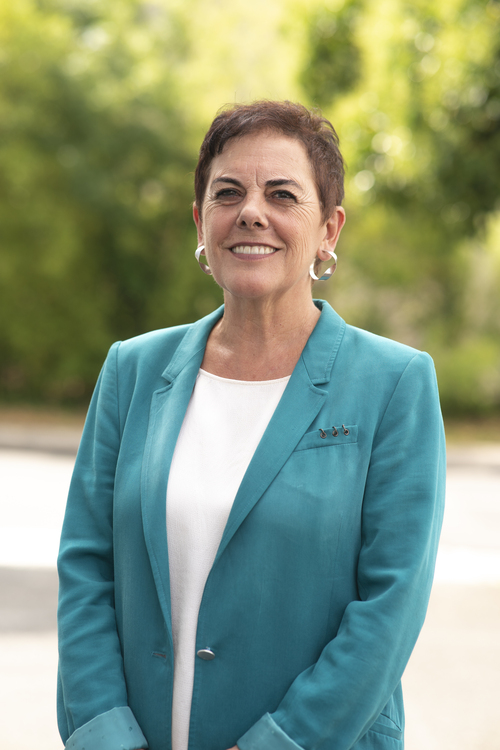
- Aizpurua in June 2023

Member of the Congress of Deputies
- Incumbent
- Assumed office 21 May 2019
- Constituency: Gipuzkoa

Mayor of Usurbil
- In office 15 June 2011 – 15 June 2015
- Preceded by: Xabier Mikel
- Succeeded by: Xabier Arregi

Personal details
- Born: María de las Mercedes Aizpurua Arzallus; 18 January 1960 (age 66) Usurbil, Basque Country, Spain
- Party: EH Bildu
- Occupation: Journalist

Mertxe Aizpurua Arzallus (born 18 January 1960) is a Spanish journalist and politician who currently serves as Member of the Congress of Deputies of Spain.

== Early life ==
Aizpurua was born on 18 January 1960 in Usurbil, Basque Country. She has a Bachelor of Information Science degree.

== Career ==
Aizpurua was editor of the Egin newspaper and Punto y Hora de Euskal Herria magazine. In September 1983 Punto y Hora published an editorial on Basque separatist "soldiers" and an interview with a brother of an ETA separatist killed whilst handling an explosive device in Tafalla, Navarre. In October 1984 the Audiencia Nacional convicted Aizpurua of "supporting terrorism" and sentenced her to one year in prison and barred her from working as a journalist for one year.

Aizpurua was a journalist at the Gara newspaper since its establishment in 1999 and was a director from 1999 to 2004. In June 2001 she was interrogated by Audiencia Nacional judge Baltasar Garzón after Gara published an interview with two ETA leaders. The case against Aizpurua was finally dropped in March 2004.

Aizpurua is currently director of Gara's 7K Sunday newspaper. She is the author of Argala: Pensamiento en Acción : Vida y Escritos (2018), a biography of assassinated ETA leader Argala.

Aizpurua contested the 2011 local elections as a Bildu electoral alliance candidate in Usurbil and was elected. She was mayor of Usurbil from 2011 to 2015 and president of Udalbiltza (an association of municipalities from the greater Basque Country) from 2012 to 2015. She contested the 2019 general election as an EH Bildu electoral alliance candidate in the Province of Gipuzkoa and was elected to the Congress of Deputies.

== Personal life ==
Aizpurua is married and has a son.

== Electoral history ==
Electoral history of Mertxe Aizpurua
Election	Constituency	Party	Alliance	No.	Result
2011 local	Usurbil		Bildu	1	Elected
2019 general	Province of Gipuzkoa		EH Bildu	1	Elected
