= Igor López de Munain =

Basque politician (died 2022)

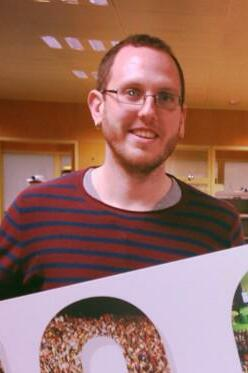

Member of the Basque Parliament
- In office 20 November 2012 – 26 May 2016
- Constituency: Álava

Personal details
- Born: 1983 or 1984 Vitoria-Gasteiz, Basque Country, Spain
- Died: 19 July 2022 (aged 38)
- Party: EH Bildu
- Other political affiliations: Aralar

Igor López de Munain Ganuza (1983/1984 – 19 July 2022) was a Basque politician who served in the Basque Parliament from 2012 until 2016. López de Munain was a member of EH Bildu.

== Biography ==
López de Munain was born in 1983 or 1984 in Vitoria-Gasteiz, Basque Country. His family was originally from Navarre. López de Munain received an undergraduate degree in political science and public administration, and he held a postgraduate degree in dynamization of participatory processes. López de Munain also held a Master of Business Administration degree.

Before joining EH Bildu, López de Munain was the leader of Aralar in the province of Álava. López de Munain was elected to the Basque Parliament in the 2012 Basque regional election as a member of EH Bildu. While in parliament, López de Munain was a staunch opponent of Iñigo Urkullu, the president of the Basque Country. He was also one of the youngest members of the Basque Parliament at the time. López de Munain remained in parliament until 2016, serving one term.

After leaving parliament, López de Munain became the director of Paris 365, a solidarity food pantry based in Navarre. López de Munain died on 19 July 2022 at the age of 38.
