= Unai Hualde =

Spanish politician

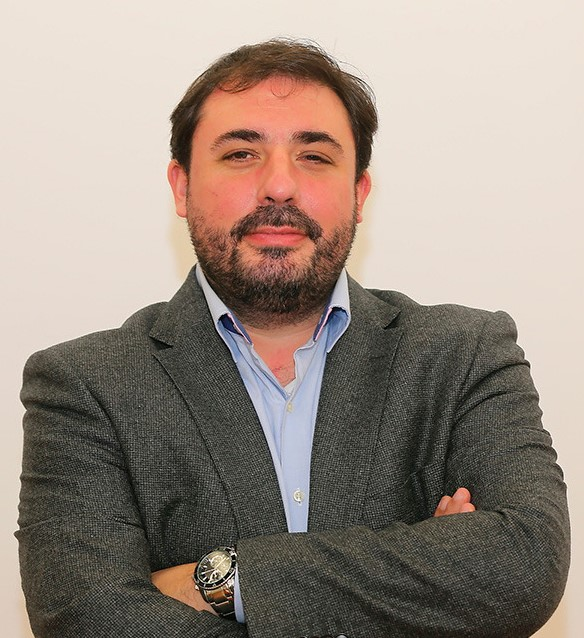

President of the Parliament of Navarre
- Incumbent
- Assumed office 19 June 2019
- Preceded by: Ainhoa Aznarez (Podemos)

First Vice-President of the Parliament of Navarre
- In office 17 June 2015 – 18 June 2019
- Preceded by: Samuel Caro (PSN)
- Succeeded by: Inmaculada Jurío (PSN)

Member of the Parliament of Navarre
- Incumbent
- Assumed office 17 June 2015

Mayor of Altsasu
- In office 2007–2011
- Preceded by: Asun Fernández de Garaialde (Aralar)
- Succeeded by: Garazi Urrestarazu (Bildu)

Member of the Altsasu City Council
- In office 2003–2016

Personal details
- Born: Unai Hualde Iglesias; 25 July 1976 (age 50) Altsasu, Navarre, Spain
- Party: Basque National Party (1999–present); Geroa Bai (2015–present)
- Other political affiliations: Nafarroa Bai (2004–2015)
- Education: University of Deusto
- Occupation: Legal counselor
- Website: Personal Twitter

Unai Hualde Iglesias (born 25 July 1976) is a Navarrese politician from the Basque National Party and a leading member of the coalition Geroa Bai. He is the president of the Basque National Party in Navarre, as well as a Member of the Parliament of Navarre since 2015. He served as the First Vice-president of the Parliament of Navarre from 2015 to 2019, during its 9th term. In 2019 he was elected as the President of the Parliament of Navarre for its 10th term. He was re-elected in 2023.

== Early life ==
His grandfather was imprisoned after the coup of 1936. He is the son of Jose Mari Hualde and the txistulari Margari Iglesias. He was born in Altsasu, and he has two younger sisters. He holds a degree in law from the University of Deusto, as well as a master's degree in Staff Management. Before entering politics he worked in the private sector as legal counselor in the area of Public and Administrative Law. Since 2007 he is on unpaid leave. He became a member of the Basque National Party in 1999.

== Political career ==
=== Altsasu town council ===
He was elected as a town councilor for Altsasu in 2003, as a member of the Altsasu Group (Agrupación Altsasuarra / Altsasuko Taldea), an independent group linked to the Basque National Party. The group became second, winning three councilors, as many as the Socialist Party of Navarre, who became first. They formed an alliance with Aralar, and Hualde served as deputy mayor from 2003 to 2007.

In 2007 he was the leading candidate of the coalition Nafarroa Bai. The alliance won the election with four councilors, and Hualde was the mayor of Altsasu from 2007 to 2011. He sought re-election in 2011, but Nafarroa Bai was beaten by Bildu. Although both parties obtained four councilors, Bildu received more votes. Garazi Urrestarazu succeeded Hualde as the mayor, and from 2011 to 2015 he was a member of the local government.

In 2015 Geroa Bai, de facto successor of Nafarroa Bai, was again the most voted party and Javier Ollo became the mayor. Hualde continued as town councilor until 2016, when he resigned in order to focus on his work as Member of the Parliament of Navarre. In 2019 Geroa Bai won an overall majority in the town council. Hualde went on a symbolic place from the coalition's list.

=== Parliament of Navarre ===
He stood on fourth place of the Geroa Bai list for the 2015 Navarrese regional election. The alliance became the second party in the parliament, obtaining nine seats. On 17 June 2015 he was elected First Vice-president of the Parliament by 26 votes from Geroa Bai, EH Bildu, Podemos and Izquierda-Ezkerra.

In the 2019 Navarrese regional election Hualde stood on second place for Geroa Bai. On 19 June 2019 and after two rounds of voting he was elected President of the Parliament of Navarre with the support of Geroa Bai, the Socialist Party of Navarre, EH Bildu, Podemos-Ahal Dugu and Izquierda-Ezkerra.

In the 2023 Navarrese regional election Hualde was once again on second place of Geroa Bai's list. On 16 June 2023 he was re-elected as President of the Parliament of Navarre in the first round of voting, supported by Geroa Bai, PSN, EH Bildu and Contigo-Zurekin. He is the first person to serve in the post for more than one term.

=== Within the Basque National Party ===
He became a member of the Basque National Party during the summer of 1999, and in 2004 he was elected as member of the Navarrese Executive Branch of the party. From July 2015 to January 2016 he served as acting leader of the party in Navarre, after Manu Ayerdi had stood down in order to serve as the Economic Vice-president of the Government of Navarre. In January 2016 he was named the leader of the Basque National Party in Navarre, as more than 90% of members supported him.
