= Youth in the SSW =

Political youth organization in Germany

Youth in the SSW SSWUngdom (in Danish) Jugend im SSW (in German)
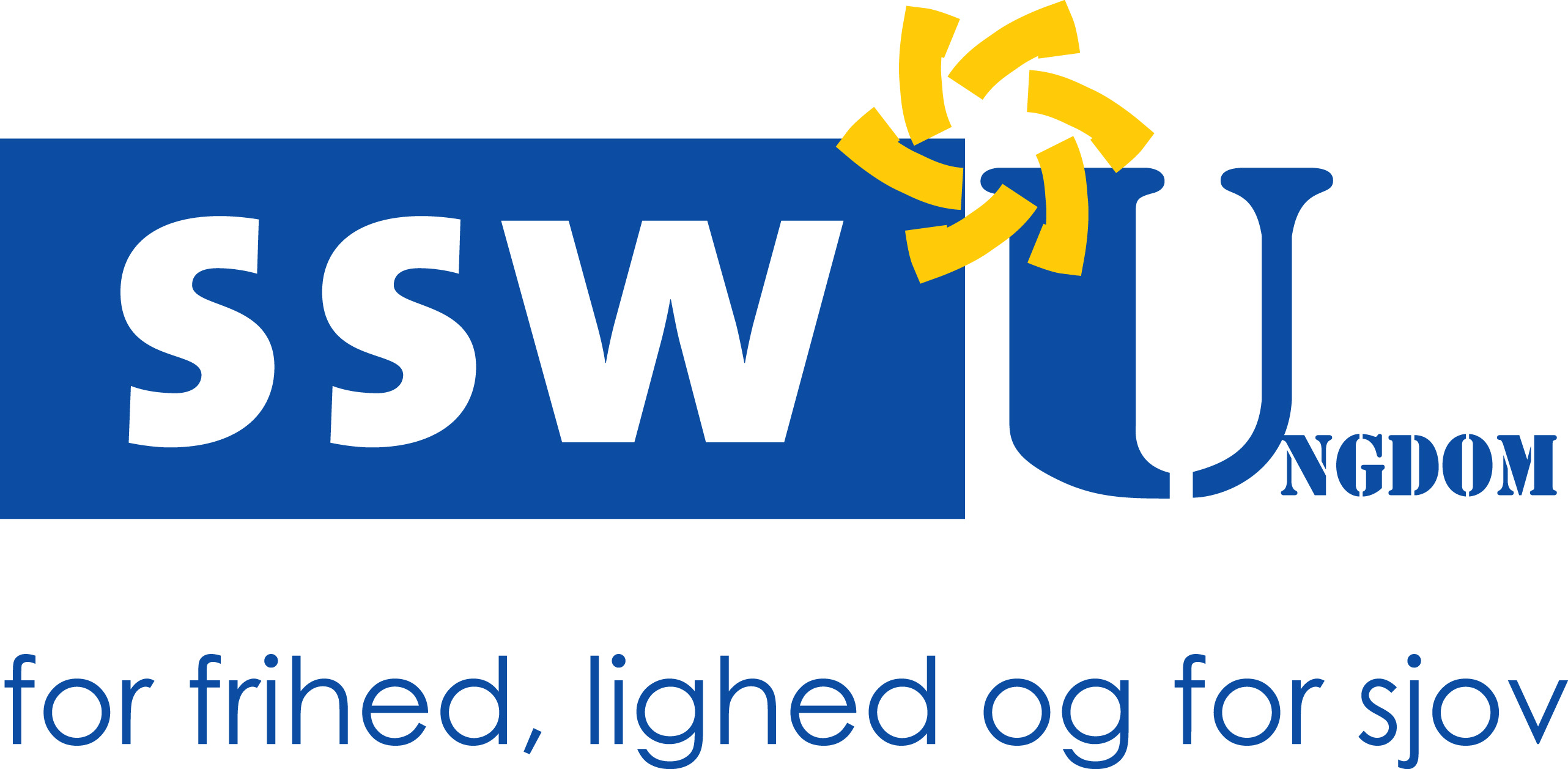
- Leader: Maylis Roßberg
- Deputy Leader: Mats Rosenbaum
- Founded: 2010
- Headquarters: Flensborghus; Norderstraße 76; 24939 Flensburg
- Ideology: Regionalism; Danish minority interests; Frisian minority interests; Social liberalism
- Mother party: South Schleswig Voters' Association
- European affiliation: European Free Alliance Youth (EFAy)
- Magazine: Nyt fra SSWUngdom
- Website: www.sswungdom.de

The Youth in the South Schleswig Voters' Association (Youth in the SSW) (Danish: SSWUngdom; German: Jugend im SSW) is a political youth organization in Germany. It is the youth wing of the South Schleswig Voters' Association.

== Names ==
The official name of the organization is Sydslesvigsk Vælgerforenings Ungdom in Danish and Jugend im Südschleswigschen Wählerverband in German. The corresponding abbreviations are SSWUngdom and Jugend im SSW, respectively. There is no official English name, but a rough translation of the German name is Youth in the South Schleswig Voters' Association, abbreviated to Youth in the SSW.

== Positions ==
According to their own description, the Youth in the SSW are non-ideological. Instead, they choose to let their political positions be determined by three factors. Members must:

- Be young.
- Have a connection to Denmark and Northern Europe.
- Be part of the Danish or Frisian minority.

Four key principles are used to determine their positions on a given matter:

- They defend the right of every human being to choose one's own path.
- They aspire to establish a welfare state in Schleswig-Holstein and Germany similar to those found in Scandinavia.
- They are attached to the region where they live (as opposed to those parts of Germany where the minority rights of the Danish population group do not apply), and wish to see it developed together with its old Danish counterpart, South Jutland County.
- Due to their youth and attachment to their home region, they wish to have the state actively defend the environment.

== History ==
Historically, the SSW has had various informal youth groups, but these tended to disband as their members left Southern Schleswig to study in the larger cities of Denmark or Germany. In 2009, Manuel J. Thomsen established Youth in the SSW with the aim of providing a more permanent youth organization. The new group held their first National Convention in 2010, where the members adopted their first by-laws, adopted their first political program, and elected their first Board, with Lukas A. Lausen as Chairman. Under Lausen, the youth wing increased its membership five-fold, doubled its budget, and formalized a relationship with the press. At the National Convention of 2011, the by-laws were changed to allow the creation of local branches, and the second National Board was elected under the chairmanship of Jonas Knickmeier.

== Structure ==
=== Internal ===
The Youth in the SSW consists of two local branches (one in Flensburg and one in Schleswig) and the national federation. The local branches, or districts, are responsible for local politics, recruiting new members and arranging informative and social gatherings. The national federation is responsible for communications and national politics. On both levels, the members gather once a year for a local or national convention in order to discharge the old board, elect a new one and debate the challenges of the coming year. The National Board consists of the chairperson and two deputies. Additionally, an indeterminate number of ordinary board members are also elected every year. The same goes for the Local Board, which is usually smaller than the National counterpart.

=== Relations to the SSW ===
Legally, the Youth in the SSW is a working group within the mother party, which means it is not an independent organization. Nevertheless, it chooses its own course, without further interference from the SSW. Furthermore, all members of the SSW under the age of 26 are members of the Youth Wing and vice versa. It sees itself as the political voice of the youth in the Danish minority of Southern Schleswig, and as responsible for making the ideas and political beliefs of that demographic clearly visible in the actions of the political representation of the minority. Therefore, it primarily functions within the larger framework of the SSW. Some elected officials of the youth wing are ex officio members of the organs of the mother party, whereas other members of the Youth in the SSW get elected to these organs in their own right. For example, the members of the youth wing elect three delegates to the National Convention of the SSW, but nothing prohibits SSW members under the age of 26 from being elected delegates by their local party branches. Financially, the bonds are tight. Eighty percent of the youth wing's budget comes from the main party, which is expected to decrease as government institutions on different administrative levels increase their shares.

== List of chairpersons ==
- Manuel J. Thomsen (2009–2010)
- Lukas A. Lausen (2010–2011)
- Jonas R. T. Knickmeier (2011)
- Claas-Frederik Johannsen (2011–2013)
- Max Kahrmann (2013–2014)
- Riike Johannsen (2014–2015)
- Christopher Andresen (2015–2020)
- Maylis Roßberg (2020–present)

== See also ==
- South Schleswig Voter Federation
- Southern Schleswig
- Youth wing
- Schleswig-Holstein
- National minority
- Duborg-Skolen
- Flensburg
