= List of presidents of the Parliament of Navarre =

President of the Parliament of Navarre
- Nafarroako Parlamentuko Lehendakariak
- Flag of Navarre

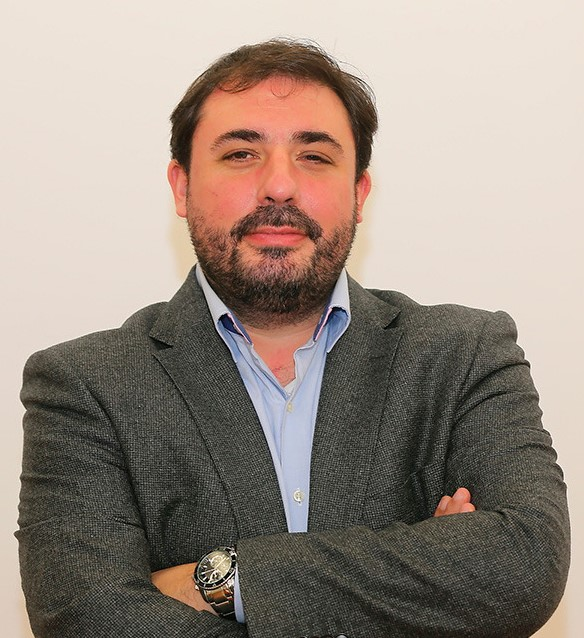
- Incumbent; Unai Hualde since 19 June 2019
- Member of: Parliament of Navarre
- Formation: 3 April 1979
- First holder: Víctor Manuel Arbeloa

This article lists the presidents of the Parliament of Navarre, the regional legislature of Navarre.

== Presidents ==
^{No.}	Name	Portrait	Party	Took office	Left office	^{Legs.}	^{Refs.}
1	Víctor Manuel Arbeloa		Socialist Party of Navarre	23 April 1979	7 June 1983	Const.	
2	Balbino Bados		Navarrese People's Union	23 June 1983	14 April 1987	1st	
3	Ignacio Javier Gomara		Navarrese People's Union	23 July 1987	2 April 1991	2nd	
4	Javier Otano		Socialist Party of Navarre	5 July 1991	4 April 1995	3rd	
5	María Dolores Eguren		Socialist Party of Navarre	26 June 1995	20 April 1999	4th	
6	José Luis Castejón		Socialist Party of Navarre	2 July 1999	1 April 2003	5th	
7	Rafael Gurrea		Navarrese People's Union	18 June 2003	19 June 2007	6th	
8	Elena Torres		Socialist Party of Navarre	20 June 2007	14 June 2011	7th	
9	Alberto Catalán		Navarrese People's Union	15 June 2011	16 June 2015	8th	
10	Ainhoa Aznarez		Podemos	17 June 2015	19 June 2019	9th	
11	Unai Hualde		Geroa Bai	19 June 2019		10th	
