= European Free Alliance Youth =

European political party youth wing

European Free Alliance Youth (EFAy)
- Formation: 2000
- Type: Self-determination; Autonomism; Progressivism
- Headquarters: Boomkwekerijstraat 1, 1000 Brussels, Belgium
- President: Valentina Servera
- Secretary General: Llŷr Williams
- Parent organization: European Free Alliance
- Affiliations: European Youth Forum
- Website: efay.eu

The European Free Alliance Youth (EFAy) is the youth wing of the European Free Alliance European political party. EFAy is a European-wide youth organisation comprised with members who belong to political organisations that safeguard and promote the cultural, linguistic and national diversity of Europe in a progressive way. Its political principles are the right for self-determination, the recognition of minorities and ethnic groups, the protection of linguistic diversity inside the EU and in the European institutions, the preservation of the multicultural identity of Europe, an inclusive approach with migration issues, the decentralisation and subsidiarity of the politics to a regional and local level, and the condemnation of any type of discrimination, neither by sex, gender or birthplace.

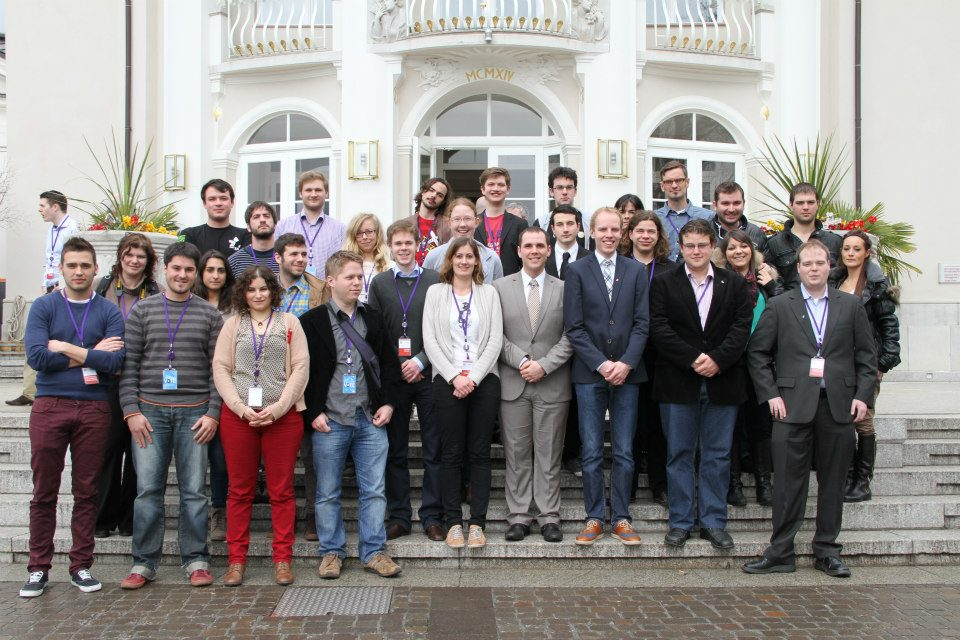
EFAy General Assembly 2013 in Meran, South Tyrol

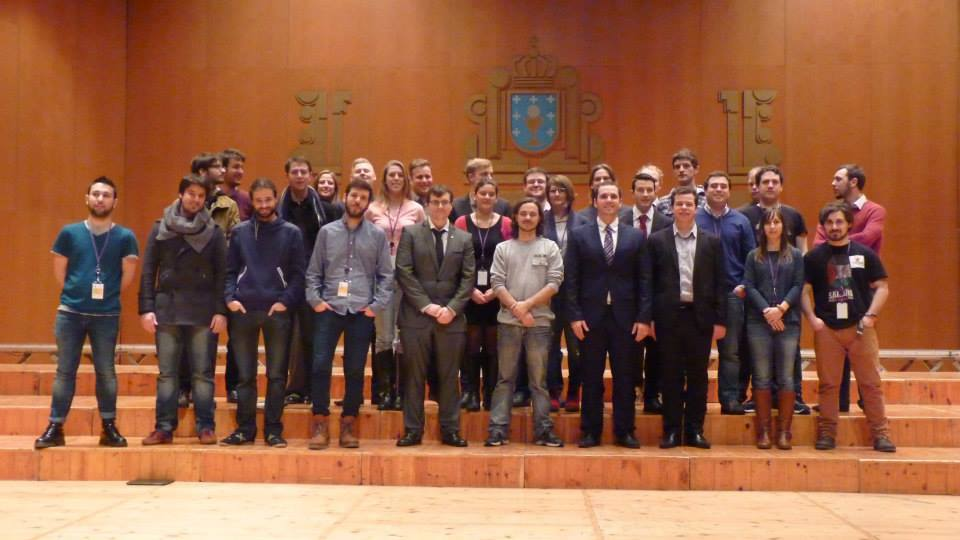
EFAy General Assembly in 2014 in Compostela, Galicia

== Bureau ==
EFAy Bureau (2019–2022)
Position	Name	Organization	Represents
President	Valentina Servera	Young Scots for Independence	Scotland
Secretary General	Llŷr Williams	Plaid Ifanc	Wales
Tresaurer	Christian Franchi	PNC Ghjuventù	Corsica
Vice-President for External Relations	Maylis Roßberg	SSW-Ungdom	Danish minority of Southern Schleswig
Vice-President	Andoni Iriondo	Gazte Abertzaleak	Basque Country
Vice-President	Andrea Mion	Sanca Veneta	Veneto
Vice-President	Oriol Roig	Young Republican Left of Catalonia	Catalan Countries
Vice-President	Lluc Sirvent	JovesPV - Compromís	Valencian Country

EFAy Presidents
Name	Organization	Represents	Years
Valentina Servera	Young Scots for Independence	Scotland	2019–present
Max Zañartu	Jovent Republicà	Catalan Countries	2016–2019
Roccu Garoby	PNC-Ghjuventù	Corsica	2012–2016
Irati Aizpurua	Gazte Abertzaleak	Basque Country	2010–2012
Jezz Anbleydh	Kernow X	Cornwall	2009–2010
Rhisiart Tal-e-bot	Kernow X	Cornwall	2007–2009
Lander de Bilbao	Gazte Abertzaleak	Basque Country	2005–2007
Jonas Dutordoir	Prego	Flanders	2003-2005
Pere Aragonès	Jovent Republicà	Catalan Countries	2001–2003
Mikel Irujo Amezaga	Gazte Abertzaleak	Basque Country	2000–2001

== Members and observers ==
=== Members ===
It draws together 33 youth organisations from different regions/nations in 15 European states

Current state	Name of the Organization	Mother Party	Represents	Link
Austria	Enotna Lista Youth	Enotna Lista (EL)	Carinthian Slovenes	
Croatia	Young Autonomists	Lista za Rijeku	Rijeka	LZR
Denmark	Junge Spitzen	Schleswig Party	Nordschleswig	JS
Denmark	Unga Tjóðveldið	Tjóðveldi	Faroe Islands	UT
Finland	Alands Framtid Youth	Ålands Framtid	Åland	AF
France	Partitu di a Nazione Corsa Ghjuventù	Partitu di a Nazione Corsa (PNC)	Corsica	PdNC
France	UDB-Yaouank	Union Démocratique Bretonne (UDB)	Brittany	UDB
Germany	Youth in the SSW	SSW	Danish minority of Southern Schleswig	Youth in the SSW
Germany	Jungbayernbund (JBB)	Bayernpartei (BP)	Bavaria	BP
Greece	Rainbow Youth	Rainbow (Vinozhito)	(North Macedonia) Macedonians	MMG
Italy	Partito Sardo d'Azione (PSd'A)	Sardinian Action Party	Sardinia	PSdA
Italy	ALPE Esprit Jeune	ALPE	Aosta Valley	ALPE
Italy	Junge Süd-Tiroler Freiheit (JSTF)	Süd-Tiroler Freiheit (STF)	South Tyrol	JSTF
Italy	Sanca Veneta		Veneto	SV
Netherlands	Fryske Nasjonale Partij Jongerein (FNPj) (FNP)	Frisian National Party (FNP)	Friesland	FNP
Poland	Młodzież Górnośląska	Ruch Autonomii Śląska	Silesia	MG
Spain/France	Gazte Abertzaleak	Eusko Alkartasuna (EA)	Euskal Herria	GA
France	Jovens d'Unitat Catalana	Unitat Catalana	(Catalonia) Catalan Countries	
Spain/France	Jovent Republicà	Esquerra Republicana	(Catalonia) Catalan Countries	JERC
Spain	Juventudes Andalucistas		Andalusia	JJAA
Spain	Galiza Nova	Bloque Nacionalista Galego (BNG)	Galicia	GN
Spain	Joves d'Esquerra Nacionalista-PSM	Partit Socialista de Mallorca (PSM)	Mallorca	JEN
Spain	JovesPV-Compromís	Bloc Nacionalista Valencià	Valencian Country	JPV
United Kingdom	Young Scots for Independence	Scottish National Party (SNP)	Scotland	ysi.scot
United Kingdom	Plaid Ifanc	Plaid Cymru	Wales	PCI
United Kingdom	Kernow X	Mebyon Kernow	Cornwall	Kernow X
Czech Republic	Mladí Moravané	Moravané	Moravia	MM

EFAy is also an observed member of European Youth Forum and collaborates with organisations like th Unrepresented Nations and Peoples Organisation (UNPO) to empower minor youth.
