= Rafael Gurrea Induráin =

Navarrese politician and parliament president (1940–2021)

President of the Parliament of Navarre
- In office 18 June 2003 – 19 June 2007
- Preceded by: José Luis Castejón Garrués
- Succeeded by: Elena Torres Miranda

Member of the Parliament of Navarre
- In office 23 April 1979 – 19 June 2007

Vice President of the Government of Navarre
- In office 18 September 1996 – 2003
- President: Miguel Sanz
- Preceded by: Juan Cruz Alli
- Succeeded by: Francisco Iribarren Fentanes

Director of the Interior and Local Administration of the Government of Navarre
- In office 1996–2003
- President: Miguel Sanz
- Preceded by: Federico Tajadura Iso
- Succeeded by: Javier Caballero Martínez

Vice President of the Navarrese People's Union
- In office 1997 – 23 February 2021
- Preceded by: Miguel Sanz
- Succeeded by: TBD

Mayor of Burlada
- In office 1987–1991
- Preceded by: Antonio Echarte Uztárroz
- Succeeded by: Ernesto Urdapilleta Marrodán

Personal details
- Born: 10 June 1940 Lumbier, Navarre, Spain
- Died: 23 February 2021 (aged 80) Pamplona, Spain
- Party: Navarrese People's Union; Union of the Democratic Centre
- Spouse: Maria Pilar Mondurrey
- Children: Three

Rafael Gurrea Induráin (10 June 1940 – 23 February 2021) was a Spanish politician and member of the Navarrese People's Union (UPN). Gurrea served as the Vice President of the Government of Navarre from 1996 to 2003 and the President of the Parliament of Navarre, the unicameral legislature of Navarre, from 18 June 2003 to 19 June 2007. He was also Vice President of the Navarrese People's Union (UPN) from 1997 until his death in 2021.

Rafael Gurrea Induráin died in Pamplona on 23 February 2021, at the age of 80. He was survived by his wife, Maria Pilar Mondurrey, and three children.
