= Government of María Chivite =

Government of María Chivite may refer to:

- First government of María Chivite, 2019–2023
- Second government of María Chivite, from 2023
