= Nuria Medina =

Spanish politician (born 1978)

Member of the Senate
- Incumbent
- Assumed office 23 July 2023
- Constituency: Navarre

Personal details
- Born: 20 March 1978 (age 48)
- Party: Spanish Socialist Workers' Party

Nuria Medina Santos (born 20 March 1978) is a Spanish politician serving as a member of the Senate since 2023. From 2015 to 2023, she was a member of the Parliament of Navarre.
