= Young Patriots (Basque Country) =

Youth wing of the Basque social democratic party Eusko Alkartasuna

Young Patriots Gazte Abertzaleak
- Secretary General: Ibon Garcia
- Founded: 1988
- Headquarters: Portuetxe bidea, 23- 1º, 20018 San Sebastián
- Ideology: Basque independence Republicanism; Internationalism; Feminism
- Mother party: Eusko Alkartasuna
- European affiliation: European Free Alliance Youth (EFAy)
- Website: www.gazteabertzaleak.eus

Young Patriots (in Basque: Gazte Abertzaleak (GA)) is since 1988 the youth wing of the Basque political party Eusko Alkartasuna (EA). Gazte Abertzaleak is a founding member of the EFAY (Youth branch of the European Free Alliance).

Gazte Abertzaleak has an ideology in common with Eusko Alkartasuna, but assuming their own position on several issues due to the political autonomy they enjoy. GA is represented in the executive board of every local organization of EA, in regional organizations and its secretary general is full member of the national executive of the mother party Eusko Alkartasuna.

Their current secretary general is Andoni Iriondo, elected in 2019

== Secretaries general ==
- 1988–1990 – Sabin Arana
- 1990–1992 – Fernando Velasco
- 1992–1994 – Yon Goikoetxea
- 1994–1996 – Jon Ander Arrieta
- 1996–1998 – Peio Urizar
- 1998–2002 – Martín Arámburu
- 2002–2004 – Andoni Iturzaeta
- 2004–2007 – Ibon Usandizaga
- 2007–2008 – Harkaitz Millan
- 2008–2009 – Alain Zamorano
- 2009–2012 – Maider Carrere
- 2012–2014 – Haritz Perez
- 2014–2016 – Ibon Garcia
- 2016–2019 – Asier Gomez
- 2019–present – Andoni Iriondo

== Former members ==
- Alex Alba
- Martin Aranburu
- Ikerne Badiola
- Mikel Irujo
- Onintza Lasa
- Maiorga Ramirez
- Elisa Sainz de Murieta
- Pello Urizar
- Fernando Velasco
- Maider Carrere
- Haritz Perez
