= Republican Youth of Catalonia =

Left-wing political party

Republican Youth Jovent Republicà
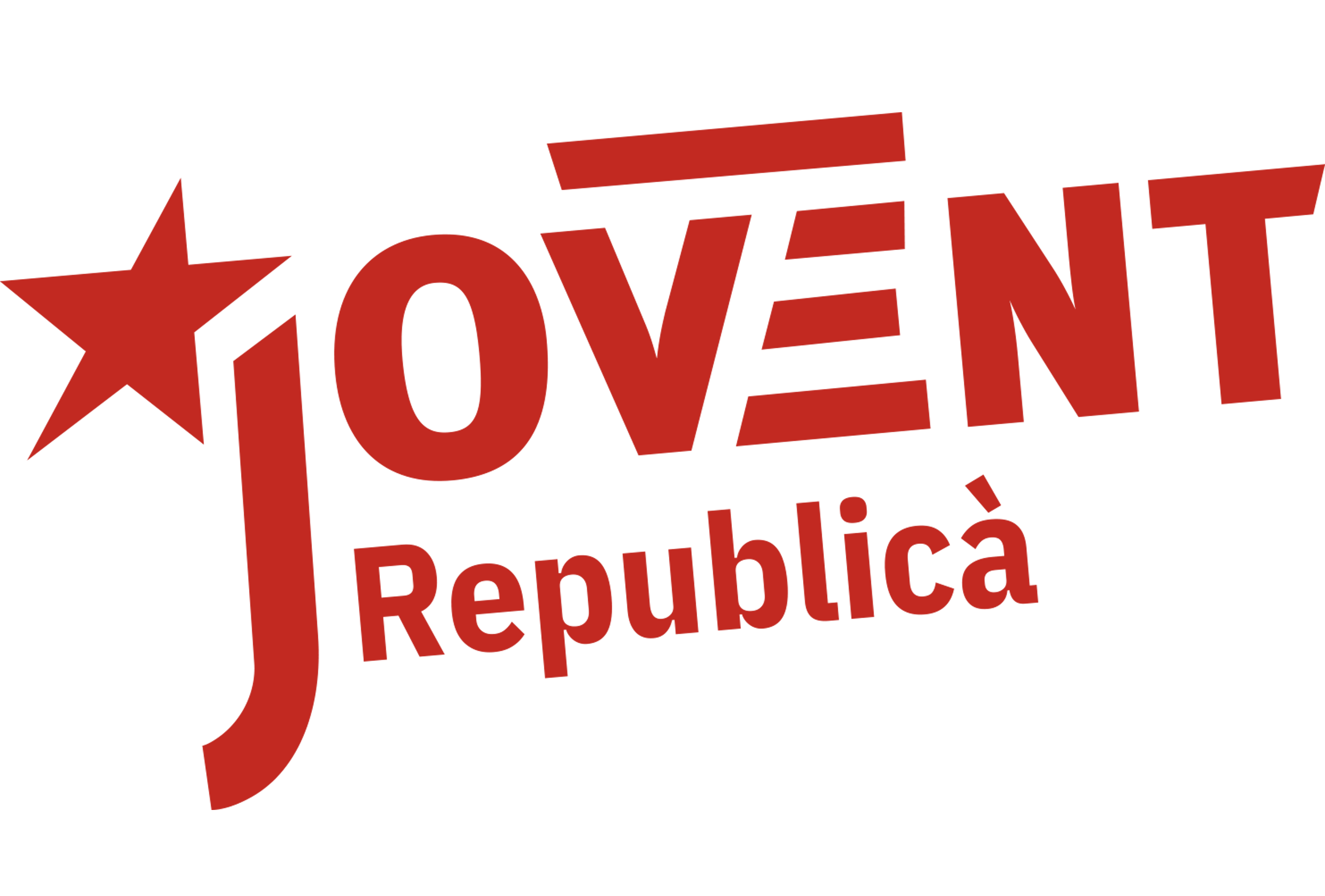
- Spokesperson: Marc Martínez i Romeu
- Founded: 26 October 1930
- Headquarters: c/ Mallorca, 56-58, Barcelona
- Membership: 1,412 (June 2018)
- Ideology: Catalan independence Republicanism; Democratic socialism Feminism; Ecologism
- Mother party: Republican Left of Catalonia
- International affiliation: EFAy (European Free Alliance Youth)
- Newspaper: La Veu del Jovent
- Website: www.joventrepublica.cat

The Republican Youth (in Catalan: Jovent Republicà) is a left-wing political party, and also the youth wing of the Republican Left of Catalonia (in Catalan: Esquerra Republicana de Catalunya, ERC), a Catalan pro-independence party. Until April 2018 it was known as Young Republican Left of Catalonia. (JERC in Catalan initials).

According to their declaration of principles, the aim of Jovent Republicà is to "attain a democratic society, free of any social or national oppression within an ecologically balanced territory, by bringing awareness and mobilizing the youth of the Catalan Countries (Països Catalans)". They support the independence of Catalonia and the rest of the Països Catalans. It is currently the largest youth organisation in Catalonia, with over 1,400 members.

One of their main annual activities is the political music festival, Acampada Jove, which attracts thousands of Catalan youngsters each year. For the past ten years it has been held in the southern Catalan town of Montblanc.

Their current spokesman is Marc Martínez i Romeu, currently serving his first term in the position. Jovent Republicà also publishes its own magazine, called La Flama (The Flame). Like ERC, they use both the traditional blue and socialist red versions of the Catalan pro-independence flag, the estelada.

== History ==
=== Origins ===
As a result of the merge of several local republican youth organizations, the Assembly of the Catalan Left was called on October 26, 1931. On this day, the JEREC, Joventuts d'Esquerra Republicana - Estat Català, was created at the headquarters of the Autonomous Commerce and Industry Deputy Center (CADCI) in Barcelona. The Assembly consisted of approximately 600 people and Josep Dencàs, Miquel Badia, Ramon Duran, Josep Fontbernat and Carles Duran were chosen to the board of the executive committee. The JEREC began to implement itself around Catalonia, cementing their presence in new headquarters around Barcelona and by organising various public acts throughout the 1930s. Despite being essentially a local force in Barcelona, throughout the 30s they promote a process of expansion which will promote growth in inland Catalonia.

=== The Republican Era. 1931 ===
With the proclamation of the republic and the restitution of the Generalitat of Catalonia, a stage of progress in social rights and freedoms begins, where approval by referendum on the autonomy statute that corresponds to Catalan self-government and recovers part of the freedoms snatched during the war of succession, becomes an indispensable point. During these years of republican government the JEREC also participate in the governability of the country and during the first years of the republic when they constitute the guerrillas, there are many acts, athletic days and parades.

In May of the 36, in a complicated context and with the attempt to reunify and to fortify the youths, the change of denomination and the adoption of the new abbreviations is proposed: JERC, like at present. With the outbreak of the civil war, much of the militancy became part of the Macià-Companys Column and other detachments of what would be the Regular People's Army in order to defend the Republican legitimacy on the front.

=== During the dictatorship, the dark age. 1939 ===
The end of the civil war and the victory of the Franco regime generates an exodus and personal losses hardly repairable. A lot of youthful militancy must be exiled, imprisoned or killed in the battlefields.

Even so, despite the difficulties, the flame of youth republicanism is maintained since exile and underground embodied by the leaders of the Víctor Torres and Heribert Barrera periods. In the first years some militants, both of Esquerra and of the JERC, also join the National Front of Catalonia, which brings together the clandestine struggle. In 1945 the JERC were recompiled in exile, however, the long tunnel of the Franco regime leads to a testimonial survival of the political organizations overdue. The main task during the Franco regime is to maintain the activity in exile and to resist in the clandestine struggle inside the country.

=== The reconstruction of the JERC. 1976 ===
At the end of 1976, the younger members of Esquerra headed by Boi Fuster, Maria Teresa Puigoriol, Jordi Rull and Martí Marcó - who was murdered by the Spanish police in a shooting in 1979 - set in motion the reconstruction of the youth political space near Esquerra and adopt the official and definitive name of Joventuts d'Esquerra Republicana de Catalunya, the JERC. During this stage and under the leadership (in that order) by Jordi Rull, Joan López, Santiago Sala, Dolors Rovira, Albert Freixa, Joaquim Micó, Francesc Garriga, Jordi Olivella and Francesc Xavier Simó, the JERC will fight to organize around the territory and gain visibility.

=== Growth and social influence. 1987 ===
It is from 1987, when with the Crida to Esquerra, hundreds of young people rebuild the party and youth, and recover the space of the Left Independent. The reception of a new militancy quadruples the existing organization before 1987. In that same year the JERC celebrated its tenth congress, under the motto "The Independent Force of the Future" and Joan Puigcercós is elected as Secretary General of the " organization

The refurbishment of the JERC, led by the same Puigcercós, is to organize the organization internally, establish the ideological bases and establish a new image, with the incorporation of the current logo. It is also in the early 1990s when the JERC assume the scope of the Catalan Countries in their statutes. The JERC continues to expand its militant base, both from the point of numerical development, as well as territorial, and from international relations.

The recognition of the JERC as an autonomous youth political organization during the 18th National Left Congress in Vic in 1992 and the signing of a Protocol of Relationships between Esquerra and JERC in January 1993 represent full consolidation and maturity. It is from this moment that the JERC acquires the total competition in the youth field, work that is consolidated as of the 13th national congress where David Minoves is elected as secretary general. During this time it is when the social incidence increases with media and multimodal actions. Highlighted are the campaigns in favor of disobedience to compulsory military service or the fight against repression, arrests and torture during the Olympic Games in Barcelona.

With the national leadership of Esquerra headed by Àngel Colom and Pilar Rahola there is a distancing between the two organizations due to discrepancies over methods of action and political practice. In 1996, the JERC celebrated its national congress in Tarragona where they chose Camil Ros as Secretary General to continue betting and extending the ideological struggle to build a party that embodies the values of the left and independence.

=== The JERC as a youth movement. 1997 ===
As of 1997, the organization makes a generational change and at the National Congress of Manlleu they choose Uriel Bertran with the Secretary General, who will be six years holding this responsibility. In those years, work is prioritized in improving the living conditions of young people from a pro-independence analysis and a popular mobilization strategy. The organizational structure is changed and it is simplified by adopting the terminology of the national spokesperson to define the person who leads the organization.

The conception of the JERC as a true youth movement is to promote and energise the participation of the militancy in sectoral organizations and fabricate a network to open the organization to society. This social and popular dynamic is promoted, in order to combine institutional work with the street fight. Starting in 1996, the Acampada Jove project, the political-musical festival of reference in the Catalan Countries, that thousands of young people congregate each summer, as well as the Casals Tio Canya, which become meeting points and youth social centers, opens. Also, it emphasizes all the work that was done in institutes and universities with the student movements.

It is a politically intense period in which the JERC becomes a youth mobilization tool to fight against the different educational reforms, the national hydrological plan, the wars in Iraq and Afghanistan or the struggle for decent housing.

=== The first left-wing and Catalanist government since 1939. 2003 ===
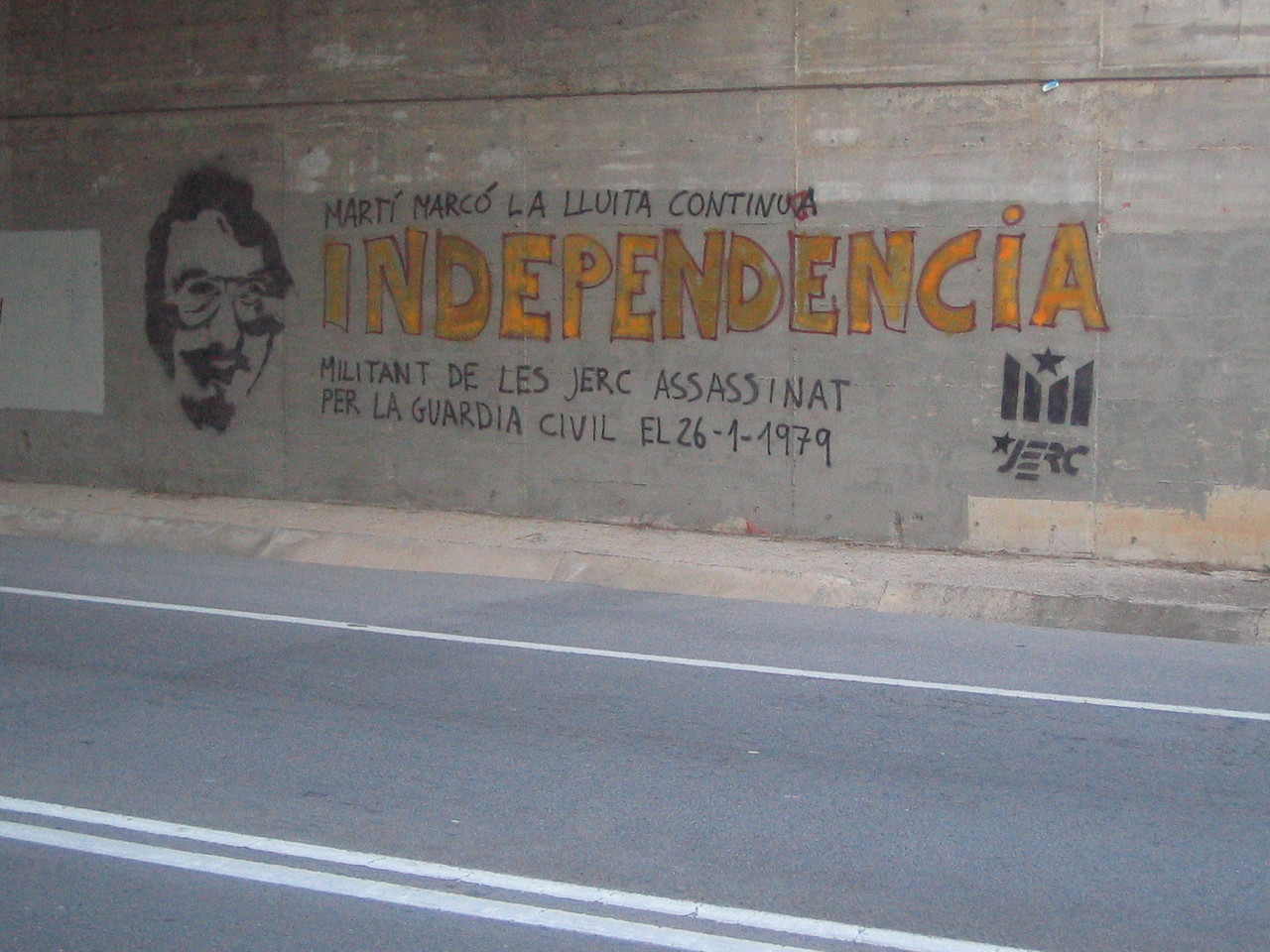
Mural by JERC in Sabadell

In the framework of the 19th National Congress held in 2003, Pere Aragonès, he became the new national spokesman in a new political context for the modern JERC. The increase of Left in the polls and the consequent formation of the first Catalan and leftist government, leads the JERC to jump. They move from the youth mobilization to having government responsibilities and managing the youth policies of the Principality. The JERC faces the challenge of moving what they said to the streets in the institutions. At this stage, the JERC are opposed to the reform of the Statute of Autonomy of Catalonia that had been cut in Madrid, leading this position in the party itself, as well as the constant mobilization of the youth with important media actions such as It was chained to the headquarters of the COPE chain in Madrid.

From 2007 until 2011, Gerard Coca becomes the new spokesman for the organization. In this period, it is about managing a moment of internal convulsion to the left wing and administering the second left coalition government in which, the JERC, with responsibilities in the leadership of the secretariat of youth, drives a true emancipation network with the young offices around the Catalan territory. Special emphasis is placed on youth policies, affecting decent housing, the right to work or quality education. In this context, the economic crisis explodes and the JERC continue fighting to improve the conditions of life of the youth as well as to link the exit of the crisis when leaving Spain.

=== Reorganisation and rise of the independentist youth movement. 2011 ===
At the 23rd national congress held in Terrassa in 2011, the militancy chose Gerard Gómez del Moral as the new spokesman. At this time the JERC are facing the challenge of becoming the referent organization of the youth of the Catalan Countries to relaunch youth independentism.

In a moment of demand for more transparency and democracy, the JERC participate in the impulse of the independentist debate in order to build a better future for the youth of the country. There are massive mobilizations that force the beginning of the process of independence of the Principality and a growing democratic confrontation with a recent, antisocial and demophobic Spanish state. After the celebration of the 9N of 2014, where more than 2 million citizens are expressed in favor of independence, they face a plebiscitation election from which the first Independent Parliament and Government of the Principality will emerge.

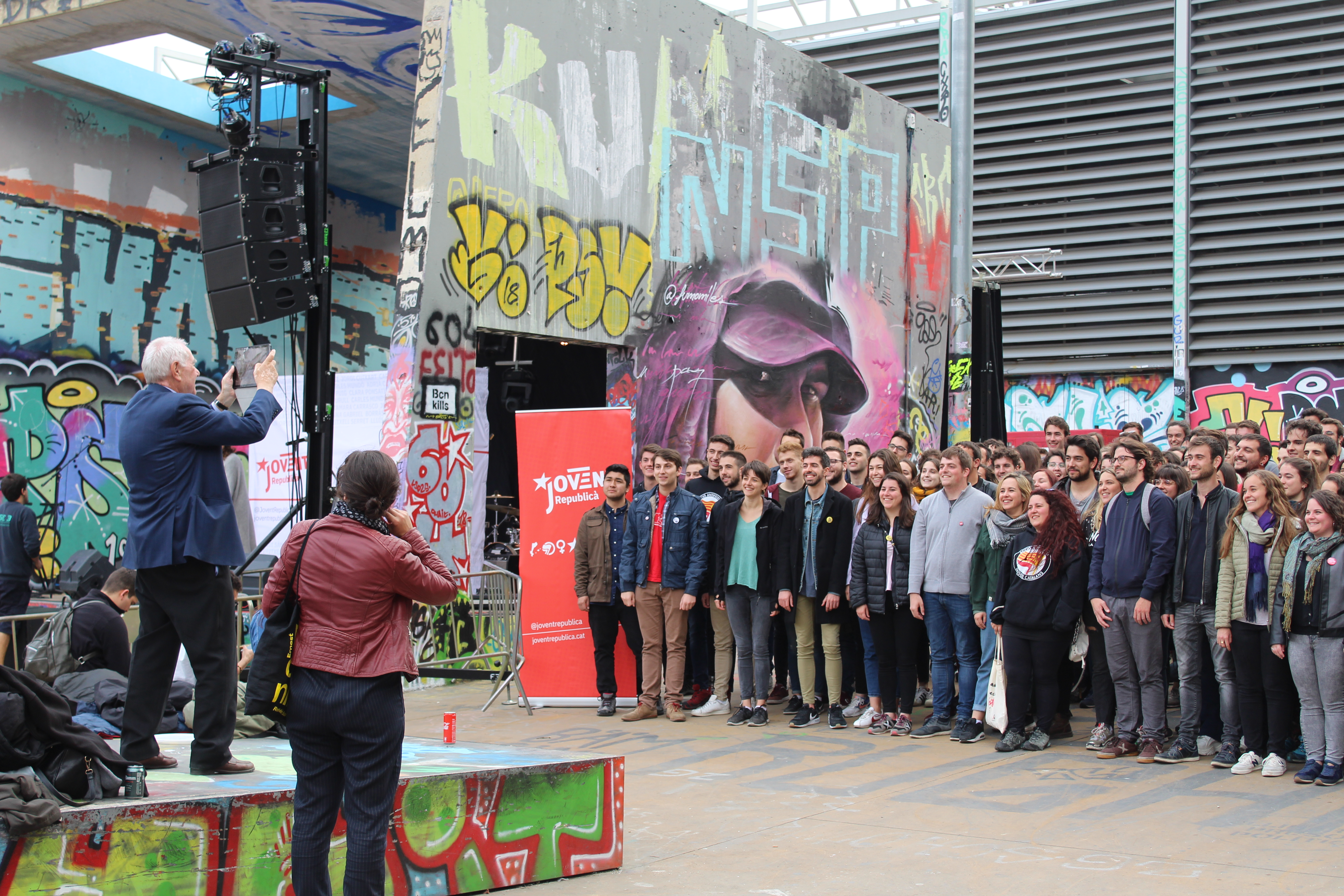
Members and municipal election candidates of Jovent Republicà in Barcelona, 2018.

=== The Present, Referendum for Catalan Independence and Creation of the Republic. 2017 ===
At the 26th National Congress held in Benicarló in 2017, the militancy chooses Pau Morales as the new spokesman. The JERC are facing a new stage by approving new statutes for the first time in 18 years with the intention of becoming a more modern and effective tool that acts in symbiosis with many other social, associative, student and political groups.

It is about becoming the most useful and most useful political tool to reclaim the role of the youth when dealing with the Independence Referendum on October 1, 2017 and trigger the opening of a constituent process popular of the Catalan Republic, opposite of the social and national liberation of the Catalan Countries. We fight for a revolutionary idea in this crazy world we live in: being ordinary young people living in a country in which it is worth living.

== Congresses ==
- I National Congress (Barcelona) 1977: Jordi Rull is elected secretary general.
- II National Congress (Barcelona) November 18, 1979: Santiago Sala is elected secretary general.
- III National Congress (Barcelona) April 27, 1980: Dolors Rovira is chosen as secretary general.
- IV National Congress (Barcelona) December 21, 1980: Albert Freixa is elected secretary general.
- V National Congress (Barcelona) March 27, 1982
- VI National Congress (Barcelona) July 9 and 10, 1983: Francesc Garriga is elected secretary general.
- VII National Congress (Barcelona) September 1984
- VIII National Congress (Barcelona) January 12, 1986: Jordi Olivella is made secretary general.
- IX National Congress (Barcelona) On 20 and 21 December 1986: Francesc Xavier Simó is elected as the new secretary general.
- X National Congress (Barcelona) December 12 and 13, 1987: Joan Puigcercós is chosen as secretary general.
- XI National Congress (Sitges, Garraf) March 17 and 18, 1990: Joan Puigcercós is re-elected as secretary general.
- XII National Congress (Girona) October 10 and 11, 1992: Joan Puigcercós is re-elected as secretary general.
- XIII National Congress (Barcelona) March 19 and 20, 1994: David Minoves is elected as secretary general.
- XIV National Congress (Tarragona) April 27 and 28, 1996: Camil Ros is elected as secretary general.
- XV National Congress (Manlleu, Osona) December 20 and 21, 1997: Uriel Bertran is elected as the new secretary general.
- XVI National Congress (Calella, Maresme) December 18 and 19, 1999: Uriel Bertran is re-elected as secretary general.
- XVII National Congress (Barcelona) November 25, 2000: Reform of the statutes.
- XVIII National Congress (Molins de Rei, Baix Llobregat) November 17 and 18, 2001: Uriel Bertran is re-elected. Following the reform of the statutes, the nomenclature of the general secretary is changed and for the first time he is elected as the National Spokesperson.
- XIX National Congress (Barcelona) December 13 and 14, 2003: Pere Aragones is elected as the National Spokesperson.
- XX National Congress (Vic, Osona) November 19 and 20, 2005: Pere Aragonès is re-elected National Spokesperson.
- XXI National Congress (Mataró, Maresme) November 10 and 11, 2007: Gerard Coca is chosen as the new National Spokesperson.
- XII National Congress (Celrà, Gironès) November 14 and 15, 2009: Gerard Coca is re-elected National Spokesperson.
- XXIII National Congress (Terrassa, Vallès Occidental) March 26 and 27, 2011: Gérard Gómez del Moral is elected as National Spokesperson.
- XXIV National Congress (Badalona, Barcelonès Nord) February 2, 2013: Gerard Gómez del Moral is re-elected National Spokesperson.
- XXV National Congress (Sant Feliu de Llobregat, Baix Llobregat) 21 and 22 March 2015: Gerard Gómez del Moral is elected for the third time as National Spokesperson.
- XXVI National Congress (Benicarló, Baix Maestrat) 26 and 27 November 2016: Pau Morales i Romero is elected as the new National Spokesperson.
- XXVII National Congress (Figueres) May 6, 2017: Reform of the statutes of the JERC. The organisation changes its name to Jovent Republicà.
- XXVIII National Congress (Vic, Osona) November 17 and 18, 2018: Pau Morales and Romero is re-elected national spokesman.

== Organisational structure ==
The party organises itself on different levels. Firstly, by territorial criteria, beginning with the small, local assemblies, consisting of a minimum of three members, the Spokesperson, the Secretary of Finance and the Secretary of Organisation. There are a few hundred different local assemblies, each encompassing a single municipality. Each county also organises itself as a regional assembly, consisting of the different local groups. At the top, on the highest level, you have the national executive committee, which includes all the regional spokespeople and the leaders of the respective sections inside the party.
