= Maiorga Ramirez =

Spanish politician (born 1976)

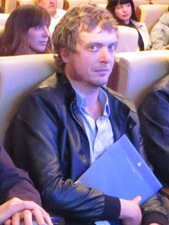
Maiorga Ramirez in June 2013

Maiorga Ramirez (born 20 July 1976) is a Basque nationalist politician. He is a leading member of the Eusko Alkartasuna (EA) in the province of Navarre in northern Spain and, since 2015, one of three just EA members of the Parliament of Navarre, where the EA sits as part of the EHB left-wing nationalist coalition.

== Life ==
Maiorga Ramirez Erro was born in Tafalla, a small town along the valley to the south of Pamplona.

He gained a degree in Philosophy from the University of the Basque Country (UPV-EHU), and in 1995 joined Eusko Alkartasuna (EA) embarking on his political career as a member of the executive of the party's youth wing (Gazte Abertzaleak /GA).

In 2000 he was nominated regional party secretary for Navarre and appointed a member of the party national executive, placed in charge of education for the region in 2004. He has been a member of the Parliament of Navarre and a local councillor for Tafalla since 2003, originally for EA and more recently for the Nafarroa Bai coalition of nationalist and regional parties. The Nafarroa Bai was dissolved in 2011, but a new left-wing nationalist coalition, EHB, was formed, and in the 2011 Navarrese election Ramirez, whose name was at the top of the new grouping's candidate list, was re-elected to the Parliament.
