= 1979 Spanish local elections in Navarre =

This article presents the results breakdown of the local elections held in Navarre on 3 April 1979. The following tables show detailed results in the autonomous community's most populous municipalities, sorted alphabetically.

== City control ==
The following table lists party control in the most populous municipalities, including provincial capitals (highlighted in bold).

Municipality	Population	New control
Burlada	15,609	Spanish Socialist Workers' Party (PSOE)
Estella	11,935	Popular Unity Candidacy (CUP) (AIE in 1980; CUP in 1980; AIE in 1981)
**Pamplona**	173,255	Spanish Socialist Workers' Party (PSOE)
Tafalla	9,950	People's Electoral Group (AEP)
Tudela	24,499	Spanish Socialist Workers' Party (PSOE)

== Municipalities ==
=== Burlada ===
Population: 15,609

Summary of the 3 April 1979 City Council of Burlada election results →
Parties and alliances	Popular vote			Seats	
Parties and alliances	Votes	%	±pp	Total	+/−
Union of the Democratic Centre (UCD)	2,267	36.60	n/a	6	n/a
Independents (INDEP)	1,833	29.59	n/a	5	n/a
Spanish Socialist Workers' Party (PSOE)	1,283	20.71	n/a	4	n/a
Navarrese Left Union (UNAI)	457	7.38	n/a	1	n/a
Communist Party of the Basque Country (PCE/EPK)	354	5.72	n/a	1	n/a
Blank ballots	0	0.00	n/a		
**Total**	**6,194**			17	**n/a**
Valid votes	6,194	96.60	n/a		
Invalid votes	218	3.40	n/a		
**Votes cast / turnout**	**6,412**	**63.07**	**n/a**		
Abstentions	3,755	36.93	n/a		
**Registered voters**	**10,167**				

=== Estella ===
Population: 11,935

Summary of the 3 April 1979 City Council of Estella election results →
Parties and alliances	Popular vote			Seats	
Parties and alliances	Votes	%	±pp	Total	+/−
Independent Group of Estella (AIE)	2,419	39.32	n/a	**7**	n/a
Popular Unity Candidacy (CUP)	2,316	37.65	n/a	**7**	n/a
Carlist Party (PC)	632	10.27	n/a	**2**	n/a
Spanish Socialist Workers' Party (PSOE)	589	9.57	n/a	**1**	n/a
Communist Party of the Basque Country (PCE/EPK)	196	3.19	n/a	0	n/a
Navarrese Left Union (UNAI)	0	0.00	n/a	0	n/a
Blank ballots	0	0.00	n/a		
**Total**	**6,152**			**17**	**n/a**
Valid votes	6,152	98.46	n/a		
Invalid votes	96	1.54	n/a		
**Votes cast / turnout**	**6,248**	**73.23**	**n/a**		
Abstentions	2,284	26.77	n/a		
**Registered voters**	**8,532**				

=== Pamplona ===
Population: 173,255

Summary of the 3 April 1979 City Council of Pamplona election results →
Parties and alliances	Popular vote			Seats	
Parties and alliances	Votes	%	±pp	Total	+/−
Union of the Democratic Centre (UCD)	18,800	23.93	n/a	**8**	n/a
Popular Unity (HB)	17,986	22.89	n/a	**7**	n/a
Spanish Socialist Workers' Party (PSOE)	13,481	17.16	n/a	**5**	n/a
Navarrese People's Union (UPN)	11,864	15.10	n/a	**5**	n/a
Basque Nationalist Party (EAJ/PNV)	4,857	6.18	n/a	**2**	n/a
Left Navarrese Assembly (ANIZ)	3,923	4.99	n/a	0	n/a
Carlist Party (PC)	2,730	3.48	n/a	0	n/a
Navarrese Left Union (UNAI)	2,293	2.92	n/a	0	n/a
Communist Party of the Basque Country (PCE/EPK)	1,433	1.82	n/a	0	n/a
Basque Country Left (EE)	1,187	1.51	n/a	0	n/a
Party of Labour of Spain (PTE)	5	0.01	n/a	0	n/a
Blank ballots	0	0.00	n/a		
**Total**	**78,559**			**27**	**n/a**
Valid votes	78,559	98.63	n/a		
Invalid votes	1,090	1.37	n/a		
**Votes cast / turnout**	**79,649**	**66.31**	**n/a**		
Abstentions	40,474	33.69	n/a		
**Registered voters**	**120,123**				

=== Tafalla ===
Population: 9,950

Summary of the 3 April 1979 City Council of Tafalla election results →
Parties and alliances	Popular vote			Seats	
Parties and alliances	Votes	%	±pp	Total	+/−
Union of the Democratic Centre (UCD)	1,973	37.33	n/a	**5**	n/a
People's Electoral Group (AEP)	1,644	31.10	n/a	**4**	n/a
Spanish Socialist Workers' Party (PSOE)	1,294	24.48	n/a	**3**	n/a
Basque Nationalist Party (EAJ/PNV)	375	7.09	n/a	**1**	n/a
Navarrese Left Union (UNAI)	0	0.00	n/a	0	n/a
Blank ballots	0	0.00	n/a		
**Total**	**5,286**			**13**	**n/a**
Valid votes	5,286	98.90	n/a		
Invalid votes	59	1.10	n/a		
**Votes cast / turnout**	**5,345**	**75.43**	**n/a**		
Abstentions	1,741	24.57	n/a		
**Registered voters**	**7,086**				

=== Tudela ===
Population: 24,499

Summary of the 3 April 1979 City Council of Tudela election results →
Parties and alliances	Popular vote			Seats	
Parties and alliances	Votes	%	±pp	Total	+/−
Spanish Socialist Workers' Party (PSOE)	3,614	29.45	n/a	**7**	n/a
Union of the Democratic Centre (UCD)	3,170	25.83	n/a	**6**	n/a
Independent Tudelan Group (ATI)	1,780	14.50	n/a	**3**	n/a
Navarrese Left Union (UNAI)	1,529	12.46	n/a	**3**	n/a
Party of Labour of Spain (PTE)	995	8.11	n/a	**1**	n/a
Communist Party of the Basque Country (PCE/EPK)	729	5.94	n/a	**1**	n/a
Carlist Party (PC)	456	3.72	n/a	0	n/a
Blank ballots	0	0.00	n/a		
**Total**	**12,273**			**21**	**n/a**
Valid votes	12,273	98.23	n/a		
Invalid votes	221	1.77	n/a		
**Votes cast / turnout**	**12,494**	**71.80**	**n/a**		
Abstentions	4,908	28.20	n/a		
**Registered voters**	**17,402**				

== See also ==
- 1979 Navarrese foral election
