= 1987 Spanish local elections in Navarre =

This article presents the results breakdown of the local elections held in Navarre on 10 June 1987. The following tables show detailed results in the autonomous community's most populous municipalities, sorted alphabetically.

== City control ==
The following table lists party control in the most populous municipalities, including provincial capitals (highlighted in bold). Gains for a party are highlighted in that party's colour.

| Municipality | Population | Previous control | New control |
|---|---|---|---|
| Barañain | 13,969 | Socialist Party of Navarre (PSN–PSOE) | Socialist Party of Navarre (PSN–PSOE) |
| Burlada | 13,949 | Socialist Party of Navarre (PSN–PSOE) | Socialist Party of Navarre (PSN–PSOE) |
| Estella | 12,603 | Independent Group of Estella (AIE) | Independent Group of Estella (AIE) |
| **Pamplona** | 178,439 | Socialist Party of Navarre (PSN–PSOE) | Navarrese People's Union (UPN) |
| Tafalla | 10,256 | Socialist Party of Navarre (PSN–PSOE) | Socialist Party of Navarre (PSN–PSOE) |
| Tudela | 26,041 | Socialist Party of Navarre (PSN–PSOE) | Socialist Party of Navarre (PSN–PSOE) |

== Municipalities ==
=== Barañain ===
Population: 13,969

Summary of the 10 June 1987 City Council of Barañain election results →
| Parties and alliances | Popular vote | | | Seats | |
| Parties and alliances | Votes | % | ±pp | Total | +/− |
|---|---|---|---|---|---|
| Socialist Party of Navarre (PSN–PSOE) | 1,519 | 24.88 | n/a | **5** | n/a |
| Pro-Barañain Independent Association (AIPB) | 1,429 | 23.40 | n/a | **4** | n/a |
| Popular Unity (HB) | 870 | 14.25 | n/a | **3** | n/a |
| Democratic and Social Centre (CDS) | 674 | 11.04 | n/a | **2** | n/a |
| United Cendea–Left Assembly (CU–EB) | 542 | 8.88 | n/a | **1** | n/a |
| Basque Country Left (EE) | 482 | 7.89 | n/a | **1** | n/a |
| Basque Solidarity (EA) | 325 | 5.32 | n/a | **1** | n/a |
| United Left (IU) | 185 | 3.03 | n/a | 0 | n/a |
| Blank ballots | 80 | 1.31 | n/a | | |
| **Total** | **6,106** | | | **17** | **n/a** |
| Valid votes | 6,106 | 99.33 | n/a | | |
| Invalid votes | 41 | 0.67 | n/a | | |
| **Votes cast / turnout** | **6,147** | **69.94** | **n/a** | | |
| Abstentions | 2,642 | 30.06 | n/a | | |
| **Registered voters** | **8,789** | | | | |

=== Burlada ===
Population: 13,949

← Summary of the 10 June 1987 City Council of Burlada election results →
| Parties and alliances | Popular vote | | | Seats | |
| Parties and alliances | Votes | % | ±pp | Total | +/− |
|---|---|---|---|---|---|
| Socialist Party of Navarre (PSN–PSOE) | 1,871 | 28.42 | −22.40 | **6** | −3 |
| Navarrese People's Union (UPN) | 1,363 | 20.70 | −6.10 | **4** | ±0 |
| Popular Unity (HB) | 1,125 | 17.09 | +0.80 | **3** | ±0 |
| Democratic and Social Centre (CDS) | 862 | 13.09 | New | **2** | +2 |
| Left Assembly of Burlada (B–Burlada) | 405 | 6.15 | New | **1** | +1 |
| Basque Solidarity (EA) | 367 | 5.57 | New | **1** | +1 |
| Basque Country Left (EE) | 271 | 4.12 | New | 0 | ±0 |
| United Left (IU) | 156 | 2.37 | New | 0 | ±0 |
| Basque Nationalist Party (EAJ/PNV) | 77 | 1.17 | −4.91 | 0 | −1 |
| Blank ballots | 87 | 1.32 | +1.32 | | |
| **Total** | **6,584** | | | **17** | **±0** |
| Valid votes | 6,584 | 99.22 | −0.78 | | |
| Invalid votes | 52 | 0.78 | +0.78 | | |
| **Votes cast / turnout** | **6,636** | **67.23** | **+7.48** | | |
| Abstentions | 3,234 | 32.77 | −7.48 | | |
| **Registered voters** | **9,870** | | | | |

=== Estella ===
Population: 12,603

← Summary of the 10 June 1987 City Council of Estella election results →
| Parties and alliances | Popular vote | | | Seats | |
| Parties and alliances | Votes | % | ±pp | Total | +/− |
|---|---|---|---|---|---|
| Independent Group of Estella (AIE) | 2,522 | 38.24 | −0.40 | **7** | ±0 |
| Socialist Party of Navarre (PSN–PSOE) | 1,788 | 27.11 | −1.07 | **5** | ±0 |
| Popular Unity (HB) | 1,037 | 15.72 | −0.27 | **2** | −1 |
| Basque Solidarity (EA) | 740 | 11.22 | New | **2** | +2 |
| Basque Country Left (EE) | 401 | 6.08 | New | **1** | +1 |
| Basque Nationalist Party (EAJ/PNV) | n/a | n/a | −10.38 | 0 | −1 |
| Carlist Party (PC) | n/a | n/a | −6.81 | 0 | −1 |
| Blank ballots | 108 | 1.64 | +1.64 | | |
| **Total** | **6,596** | | | **17** | **±0** |
| Valid votes | 6,596 | 98.36 | −1.64 | | |
| Invalid votes | 110 | 1.64 | +1.64 | | |
| **Votes cast / turnout** | **6,706** | **71.10** | **+4.92** | | |
| Abstentions | 2,726 | 28.90 | −4.92 | | |
| **Registered voters** | **9,432** | | | | |

=== Pamplona ===
Population: 178,439

← Summary of the 10 June 1987 City Council of Pamplona election results →
| Parties and alliances | Popular vote | | | Seats | |
| Parties and alliances | Votes | % | ±pp | Total | +/− |
|---|---|---|---|---|---|
| Navarrese People's Union (UPN) | 21,335 | 23.93 | +1.60 | **7** | ±0 |
| Socialist Party of Navarre (PSN–PSOE) | 19,223 | 21.56 | −14.17 | **7** | −4 |
| Popular Unity (HB) | 16,108 | 18.06 | +3.84 | **6** | +2 |
| Democratic and Social Centre (CDS) | 8,490 | 9.52 | New | **3** | +3 |
| Basque Solidarity (EA) | 6,183 | 6.93 | New | **2** | +2 |
| People's Alliance (AP)^{1} | 5,158 | 5.78 | −7.67 | **1** | −3 |
| Foral Democratic Union (PDF–PDP, PL) (UDF) | 5,144 | 5.77 | New | **1** | +1 |
| Basque Country Left (EE) | 4,270 | 4.79 | +1.67 | 0 | ±0 |
| Left Assembly of Pamplona (B–Iruñea)^{2} | 686 | 0.77 | −2.62 | 0 | ±0 |
| Basque Nationalist Party (EAJ/PNV) | 631 | 0.71 | −5.41 | 0 | −1 |
| United Left (IU) | 375 | 0.42 | New | 0 | ±0 |
| Workers' Party of Spain–Communist Unity (PTE–UC) | 341 | 0.38 | New | 0 | ±0 |
| Humanist Platform (PH) | 134 | 0.15 | New | 0 | ±0 |
| Blank ballots | 1,091 | 1.22 | +1.22 | | |
| **Total** | **89,169** | | | **27** | **±0** |
| Valid votes | 89,169 | 99.25 | −0.75 | | |
| Invalid votes | 674 | 0.75 | +0.75 | | |
| **Votes cast / turnout** | **89,843** | **67.27** | **+0.98** | | |
| Abstentions | 43,714 | 32.73 | −0.98 | | |
| **Registered voters** | **133,557** | | | | |
Sources
Footnotes: ^{1} People's Alliance results are compared to People's Coalition totals in the 1983 election.; ^{2} Left Assembly of Pamplona results are compared to Neighbourhood Labor totals in the 1983 election.

=== Tafalla ===
Population: 10,256

← Summary of the 10 June 1987 City Council of Tafalla election results →
| Parties and alliances | Popular vote | | | Seats | |
| Parties and alliances | Votes | % | ±pp | Total | +/− |
|---|---|---|---|---|---|
| Socialist Party of Navarre (PSN–PSOE) | 2,105 | 34.82 | −2.00 | **6** | +1 |
| Navarrese People's Union (UPN)^{1} | 1,804 | 29.84 | +2.56 | **5** | +1 |
| Popular Unity (HB) | 1,308 | 21.63 | +4.24 | **4** | +2 |
| Democratic and Social Centre (CDS) | 399 | 6.60 | New | **1** | +1 |
| Basque Solidarity (EA) | 379 | 6.27 | New | **1** | +1 |
| Carlist Party (PC) | n/a | n/a | −6.79 | 0 | −1 |
| Basque Nationalist Party (EAJ/PNV) | n/a | n/a | −6.49 | 0 | −1 |
| Blank ballots | 51 | 0.84 | +0.84 | | |
| **Total** | **6,046** | | | **17** | **+4** |
| Valid votes | 6,046 | 98.66 | −1.34 | | |
| Invalid votes | 82 | 1.34 | +1.34 | | |
| **Votes cast / turnout** | **6,128** | **78.85** | **+8.61** | | |
| Abstentions | 1,644 | 21.15 | −8.61 | | |
| **Registered voters** | **7,772** | | | | |
Sources
Footnotes: ^{1} Navarrese People's Union results are compared to Tafallese People's Alliance totals in the 1983 election.

=== Tudela ===
Population: 26,041

← Summary of the 10 June 1987 City Council of Tudela election results →
| Parties and alliances | Popular vote | | | Seats | |
| Parties and alliances | Votes | % | ±pp | Total | +/− |
|---|---|---|---|---|---|
| Socialist Party of Navarre (PSN–PSOE) | 4,855 | 33.43 | −15.20 | **9** | −3 |
| Navarrese People's Union (UPN) | 3,276 | 22.56 | +8.95 | **6** | +3 |
| Democratic and Social Centre (CDS) | 1,518 | 10.45 | New | **3** | +3 |
| Left Assembly of Tudela (AIT) | 1,383 | 9.52 | +3.04 | **2** | +1 |
| People's Alliance (AP)^{1} | 852 | 5.87 | −13.36 | **1** | −3 |
| United Left (IU)^{2} | 677 | 4.66 | +2.61 | 0 | ±0 |
| Popular Unity (HB) | 573 | 3.95 | +0.70 | 0 | ±0 |
| Foral Democratic Union (PDF–PDP, PL) (UDF) | 429 | 2.95 | New | 0 | ±0 |
| Carlist Party (PC) | 417 | 2.87 | −2.47 | 0 | −1 |
| Basque Solidarity (EA) | 321 | 2.21 | New | 0 | ±0 |
| Blank ballots | 221 | 1.52 | +1.52 | | |
| **Total** | **14,522** | | | **21** | **±0** |
| Valid votes | 14,522 | 98.96 | −1.04 | | |
| Invalid votes | 153 | 1.04 | +1.04 | | |
| **Votes cast / turnout** | **14,675** | **75.60** | **+3.80** | | |
| Abstentions | 4,736 | 24.40 | −3.80 | | |
| **Registered voters** | **19,411** | | | | |
Sources
Footnotes: ^{1} People's Alliance results are compared to People's Coalition totals in the 1983 election.; ^{2} United Left results are compared to Communist Party of the Basque Country totals in the 1983 election.

== See also ==
- 1987 Navarrese regional election
