= 1995 Spanish local elections in Navarre =

This article presents the results breakdown of the local elections held in Navarre on 28 May 1995. The following tables show detailed results in the autonomous community's most populous municipalities, sorted alphabetically.

== City control ==
The following table lists party control in the most populous municipalities, including provincial capitals (highlighted in bold). Gains for a party are highlighted in that party's colour.

Municipality	Population	Previous control	New control
Barañain	18,946	Socialist Party of Navarre (PSN–PSOE)	Navarrese People's Union (UPN)
Burlada	15,690	Socialist Party of Navarre (PSN–PSOE)	Socialist Party of Navarre (PSN–PSOE)
Estella	12,861	Socialist Party of Navarre (PSN–PSOE)	Socialist Party of Navarre (PSN–PSOE)
**Pamplona**	182,465	Navarrese People's Union (UPN)	Convergence of Democrats of Navarre (CDN)
Tafalla	10,329	Navarrese People's Union (UPN)	Navarrese People's Union (UPN)
Tudela	27,303	Socialist Party of Navarre (PSN–PSOE)	Navarrese People's Union (UPN)

== Municipalities ==
=== Barañain ===
Population: 18,946

← Summary of the 28 May 1995 City Council of Barañain election results →
Parties and alliances	Popular vote			Seats	
Parties and alliances	Votes	%	±pp	Total	+/−
Navarrese People's Union (UPN)	1,922	22.85	−3.25	**4**	−1
Socialist Party of Navarre (PSN–PSOE)^{1}	1,365	16.23	−23.40	**3**	−4
United Left (IU/EB)	1,313	15.61	+9.62	**3**	+2
Convergence of Democrats of Navarre (CDN)	948	11.27	New	**2**	+2
Popular Unity (HB)	786	9.35	−1.47	**2**	±0
Independent Candidacy of Barañain (CIB)	607	7.22	New	**1**	+1
Basque Solidarity (EA)	573	6.81	+0.73	**1**	±0
United Cendea Assembly (CUB)	563	6.69	−0.44	**1**	±0
Nationalists of Navarre (NA)	104	1.24	New	0	±0
Blank ballots	229	2.72	+1.47		
**Total**	**8,410**			**17**	**±0**
Valid votes	8,410	99.47	+0.11		
Invalid votes	45	0.53	−0.11		
**Votes cast / turnout**	**8,455**	**59.64**	**+1.88**		
Abstentions	5,721	40.36	−1.88		
**Registered voters**	**14,176**				
Sources
Footnotes: ^{1} Socialist Party of Navarre results are compared to the combined totals of Socialist Party of Navarre and Basque Country Left in the 1991 election.

=== Burlada ===
Population: 15,690

← Summary of the 28 May 1995 City Council of Burlada election results →
Parties and alliances	Popular vote			Seats	
Parties and alliances	Votes	%	±pp	Total	+/−
Navarrese People's Union (UPN)	1,741	25.05	+0.46	**5**	±0
Socialist Party of Navarre (PSN–PSOE)^{1}	1,472	21.18	−18.70	**4**	−3
Independents of Navarre (IN)	1,038	14.93	New	**3**	+3
United Left (IU/EB)	951	13.68	+7.93	**3**	+2
Popular Unity (HB)	938	13.49	−0.13	**2**	−1
Assembly (Batzarre)	321	4.62	−0.99	0	−1
Basque Solidarity (EA)	302	4.34	+0.08	0	±0
Blank ballots	188	2.70	+1.10		
**Total**	**6,951**			**17**	**±0**
Valid votes	6,951	99.19	+0.10		
Invalid votes	57	0.81	−0.10		
**Votes cast / turnout**	**7,008**	**56.09**	**+3.19**		
Abstentions	5,487	43.91	−3.19		
**Registered voters**	**12,495**				
Sources
Footnotes: ^{1} Socialist Party of Navarre results are compared to the combined totals of Socialist Party of Navarre and Basque Country Left in the 1991 election.

=== Estella ===
Population: 12,861

← Summary of the 28 May 1995 City Council of Estella election results →
Parties and alliances	Popular vote			Seats	
Parties and alliances	Votes	%	±pp	Total	+/−
Navarrese People's Union (UPN)	2,547	38.04	+4.32	**7**	+1
Socialist Party of Navarre (PSN–PSOE)^{1}	1,971	29.44	−0.79	**6**	±0
Unitary Candidacy of Estella (CUE/LKB)	705	10.53	+0.73	**2**	±0
Popular Unity (HB)	619	9.25	−2.35	**1**	−1
Basque Solidarity (EA)	390	5.83	−1.97	**1**	±0
Nationalists of Navarre (NA)	322	4.81	New	0	±0
Blank ballots	141	2.11	+1.07		
**Total**	**6,695**			**17**	**±0**
Valid votes	6,695	98.79	−0.44		
Invalid votes	82	1.21	+0.44		
**Votes cast / turnout**	**6,777**	**65.81**	**+1.20**		
Abstentions	3,521	34.19	−1.20		
**Registered voters**	**10,298**				
Sources
Footnotes: ^{1} Socialist Party of Navarre results are compared to the combined totals of Socialist Party of Navarre and Basque Country Left in the 1991 election.

=== Pamplona ===
Population: 182,465

← Summary of the 28 May 1995 City Council of Pamplona election results →
Parties and alliances	Popular vote			Seats	
Parties and alliances	Votes	%	±pp	Total	+/−
Navarrese People's Union (UPN)	28,687	30.41	−8.61	**10**	−3
Convergence of Democrats of Navarre (CDN)	19,247	20.40	New	**6**	+6
Socialist Party of Navarre (PSN–PSOE)^{1}	14,870	15.76	−14.03	**5**	−3
United Left (IU/EB)	10,917	11.57	+6.53	**3**	+2
Popular Unity (HB)	9,705	10.29	−2.59	**3**	−1
Basque Solidarity (EA)	4,711	4.99	−0.26	0	−1
Assembly (Batzarre)	3,276	3.47	+0.19	0	±0
Nationalists of Navarre (NA)	607	0.64	−0.25	0	±0
Platform of Independents of Spain (PIE)	358	0.38	New	0	±0
Blank ballots	1,955	2.07	+0.80		
**Total**	**94,333**			**27**	**±0**
Valid votes	94,333	99.42	−0.04		
Invalid votes	546	0.58	+0.04		
**Votes cast / turnout**	**94,879**	**64.53**	**+6.05**		
Abstentions	52,162	35.47	−6.05		
**Registered voters**	**147,041**				
Sources
Footnotes: ^{1} Socialist Party of Navarre results are compared to the combined totals of Socialist Party of Navarre and Basque Country Left in the 1991 election.

=== Tafalla ===
Population: 10,329

← Summary of the 28 May 1995 City Council of Tafalla election results →
Parties and alliances	Popular vote			Seats	
Parties and alliances	Votes	%	±pp	Total	+/−
Navarrese People's Union (UPN)	2,187	36.91	+4.25	**7**	+1
Socialist Party of Navarre (PSN–PSOE)	1,757	29.65	−1.56	**6**	±0
Popular Unity (HB)	955	16.12	−3.52	**3**	±0
Basque Solidarity (EA)	436	7.36	+1.48	**1**	±0
United Left (IU/EB)	215	3.63	+0.72	0	±0
Platform of Independents of Spain (PIE)	194	3.27	New	0	±0
Democratic and Social Centre (CDS)	n/a	n/a	−6.77	0	−1
Blank ballots	181	3.05	+2.11		
**Total**	**5,925**			**17**	**±0**
Valid votes	5,925	99.00	−0.21		
Invalid votes	60	1.00	+0.21		
**Votes cast / turnout**	**5,985**	**70.83**	**−2.95**		
Abstentions	2,465	29.17	+2.95		
**Registered voters**	**8,450**				

=== Tudela ===
Population: 27,303

← Summary of the 28 May 1995 City Council of Tudela election results →
Parties and alliances	Popular vote			Seats	
Parties and alliances	Votes	%	±pp	Total	+/−
Navarrese People's Union (UPN)	5,748	37.14	+2.60	**10**	+2
Socialist Party of Navarre (PSN–PSOE)	2,850	18.41	−17.56	**5**	−4
United Left (IU/EB)	1,690	10.92	+2.74	**2**	±0
Assembly (Batzarre)^{1}	1,611	10.41	−0.50	**2**	±0
Tudelan Union (UT)	1,444	9.33	New	**2**	+2
Platform of Independents of Spain (PIE)	551	3.56	New	0	±0
Convergence of Democrats of Navarre (CDN)	401	2.59	New	0	±0
Popular Unity (HB)	291	1.88	−1.60	0	±0
Independent Labour Association (ALIT)	237	1.53	New	0	±0
Independents of Navarre (IN)	192	1.24	New	0	±0
Basque Solidarity (EA)	79	0.51	−0.06	0	±0
Blank ballots	383	2.47	+0.59		
**Total**	**15,477**			**21**	**±0**
Valid votes	15,477	98.92	−0.19		
Invalid votes	169	1.08	+0.19		
**Votes cast / turnout**	**15,646**	**71.30**	**+1.75**		
Abstentions	6,299	28.70	−1.75		
**Registered voters**	**21,945**				
Sources
Footnotes: ^{1} Assembly results are compared to Left Assembly of Tudela totals in the 1991 election.

== See also ==
- 1995 Navarrese regional election
