= 1991 Spanish local elections in Navarre =

This article presents the results breakdown of the local elections held in Navarre on 26 May 1991. The following tables show detailed results in the autonomous community's most populous municipalities, sorted alphabetically.

== City control ==
The following table lists party control in the most populous municipalities, including provincial capitals (highlighted in bold). Gains for a party are highlighted in that party's colour.

Municipality	Population	Previous control	New control
Barañain	16,184	Socialist Party of Navarre (PSN–PSOE)	Socialist Party of Navarre (PSN–PSOE)
Burlada	14,476	Socialist Party of Navarre (PSN–PSOE)	Socialist Party of Navarre (PSN–PSOE)
Estella	12,868	Independent Group of Estella (AIE)	Socialist Party of Navarre (PSN–PSOE)
**Pamplona**	183,525	Navarrese People's Union (UPN)	Navarrese People's Union (UPN)
Tafalla	10,318	Socialist Party of Navarre (PSN–PSOE)	Navarrese People's Union (UPN)
Tudela	27,063	Socialist Party of Navarre (PSN–PSOE)	Socialist Party of Navarre (PSN–PSOE)

== Municipalities ==
=== Barañain ===
Population: 16,184

← Summary of the 26 May 1991 City Council of Barañain election results →
Parties and alliances	Popular vote			Seats	
Parties and alliances	Votes	%	±pp	Total	+/−
Socialist Party of Navarre (PSN–PSOE)	2,104	34.09	+9.21	**6**	+1
Navarrese People's Union (UPN)^{1}	1,611	26.10	+2.70	**5**	+1
Popular Unity (HB)	668	10.82	−3.43	**2**	−1
Assembly (B)	440	7.13	−1.75	**1**	±0
Basque Solidarity (EA)	375	6.08	+0.76	**1**	±0
United Left (IU)	370	5.99	+2.96	**1**	+1
Basque Country Left (EE)	342	5.54	−2.35	**1**	±0
Democratic and Social Centre (CDS)	185	3.00	−8.04	0	−2
Blank ballots	77	1.25	−0.06		
**Total**	**6,172**			**17**	**±0**
Valid votes	6,172	99.36	+0.03		
Invalid votes	40	0.64	−0.03		
**Votes cast / turnout**	**6,212**	**57.76**	**−12.18**		
Abstentions	4,542	42.24	+12.18		
**Registered voters**	**10,754**				
Sources
Footnotes: ^{1} Navarrese People's Union results are compared to Pro-Barañain Independent Association totals in the 1987 election.

=== Burlada ===
Population: 14,476

← Summary of the 26 May 1991 City Council of Burlada election results →
Parties and alliances	Popular vote			Seats	
Parties and alliances	Votes	%	±pp	Total	+/−
Socialist Party of Navarre (PSN–PSOE)	2,049	35.36	+6.94	**7**	+1
Navarrese People's Union (UPN)	1,425	24.59	+3.89	**5**	+1
Popular Unity (HB)	789	13.62	−3.47	**3**	±0
United Left (IU)	333	5.75	+3.38	**1**	+1
Assembly (B)	325	5.61	−0.54	**1**	±0
Democratic and Social Centre (CDS)	272	4.69	−8.40	0	−2
Basque Country Left (EE)	262	4.52	+0.40	0	±0
Basque Solidarity (EA)	247	4.26	−1.31	0	−1
Blank ballots	93	1.60	+0.28		
**Total**	**5,795**			**17**	**±0**
Valid votes	5,795	99.09	−0.13		
Invalid votes	53	0.91	+0.13		
**Votes cast / turnout**	**5,848**	**52.90**	**−14.33**		
Abstentions	5,207	47.10	+14.33		
**Registered voters**	**11,055**				

=== Estella ===
Population: 12,603

← Summary of the 26 May 1991 City Council of Estella election results →
Parties and alliances	Popular vote			Seats	
Parties and alliances	Votes	%	±pp	Total	+/−
Navarrese People's Union (UPN)^{1}	2,171	33.72	−4.52	**6**	−1
Socialist Party of Navarre (PSN–PSOE)	1,906	29.61	+2.50	**6**	+1
Popular Unity (HB)	747	11.60	−4.12	**2**	±0
Unitary Candidacy of Estella (CUE/LKB)	631	9.80	New	**2**	+2
Basque Solidarity (EA)	502	7.80	−3.42	**1**	−1
Carlist Party (PC)	213	3.31	New	0	±0
Basque Country Left (EE)	201	3.12	−2.96	0	−1
Blank ballots	67	1.04	–0.60		
**Total**	**6,438**			**17**	**±0**
Valid votes	6,438	99.23	+0.87		
Invalid votes	50	0.77	−0.87		
**Votes cast / turnout**	**6,488**	**64.61**	**−6.49**		
Abstentions	3,554	35.39	+6.49		
**Registered voters**	**10,042**				
Sources
Footnotes: ^{1} Navarrese People's Union results are compared to Independent Group of Estella totals in the 1987 election.

=== Pamplona ===
Population: 183,525

← Summary of the 26 May 1991 City Council of Pamplona election results →
Parties and alliances	Popular vote			Seats	
Parties and alliances	Votes	%	±pp	Total	+/−
Navarrese People's Union (UPN)^{1}	32,820	39.02	+3.54	**13**	+4
Socialist Party of Navarre (PSN–PSOE)	22,605	26.87	+5.31	**8**	+1
Popular Unity (HB)	10,835	12.88	−5.18	**4**	−2
Basque Solidarity (EA)	4,418	5.25	−1.68	**1**	−1
United Left (IU)	4,239	5.04	+4.62	**1**	+1
Assembly (B)	2,757	3.28	+2.51	0	±0
Basque Country Left (EE)	2,456	2.92	−1.87	0	±0
Democratic and Social Centre (CDS)	1,838	2.18	−7.34	0	−3
Basque Nationalist Party (EAJ/PNV)	751	0.89	+0.18	0	±0
Carlist Party (PC)	333	0.40	New	0	±0
Blank ballots	1,069	1.27	+0.05		
**Total**	**84,121**			**27**	**±0**
Valid votes	84,121	99.46	+0.21		
Invalid votes	456	0.54	−0.21		
**Votes cast / turnout**	**84,577**	**58.48**	**−8.79**		
Abstentions	60,041	41.52	+8.79		
**Registered voters**	**144,618**				
Sources
Footnotes: ^{1} Navarrese People's Union results are compared to the combined totals of Navarrese People's Union, People's Alliance and Foral Democratic Union in the 1987 election.

=== Tafalla ===
Population: 10,318

← Summary of the 26 May 1991 City Council of Tafalla election results →
Parties and alliances	Popular vote			Seats	
Parties and alliances	Votes	%	±pp	Total	+/−
Navarrese People's Union (UPN)	1,921	32.66	+2.82	**6**	+1
Socialist Party of Navarre (PSN–PSOE)	1,836	31.21	−3.61	**6**	±0
Popular Unity (HB)	1,155	19.64	−1.99	**3**	−1
Democratic and Social Centre (CDS)	398	6.77	+0.17	**1**	±0
Basque Solidarity (EA)	346	5.88	−0.39	**1**	±0
United Left (IU)	171	2.91	New	0	±0
Blank ballots	55	0.94	+0.10		
**Total**	**5,882**			**17**	**±0**
Valid votes	5,882	99.21	+0.55		
Invalid votes	47	0.79	−0.55		
**Votes cast / turnout**	**5,929**	**73.78**	**−5.07**		
Abstentions	2,107	26.22	+5.07		
**Registered voters**	**8,036**				

=== Tudela ===
Population: 27,063

← Summary of the 26 May 1991 City Council of Tudela election results →
Parties and alliances	Popular vote			Seats	
Parties and alliances	Votes	%	±pp	Total	+/−
Socialist Party of Navarre (PSN–PSOE)	5,154	35.97	+2.54	**9**	±0
Navarrese People's Union (UPN)^{1}	4,949	34.54	+3.16	**8**	+1
Left Assembly of Tudela (AIT)	1,563	10.91	+1.39	**2**	±0
United Left (IU)	1,172	8.18	+3.52	**2**	+2
Popular Unity (HB)	499	3.48	−0.47	0	±0
Democratic and Social Centre (CDS)	487	3.40	−7.05	0	−3
Carlist Party (PC)	152	1.06	−1.81	0	±0
Basque Solidarity (EA)	81	0.57	−1.64	0	±0
Blank ballots	270	1.88	+0.36		
**Total**	**14,327**			**21**	**±0**
Valid votes	14,327	99.11	+0.15		
Invalid votes	129	0.89	−0.15		
**Votes cast / turnout**	**14,456**	**69.55**	**−6.05**		
Abstentions	6,330	30.45	+6.05		
**Registered voters**	**20,786**				
Sources
Footnotes: ^{1} Navarrese People's Union results are compared to the combined totals of Navarrese People's Union, Foral Democratic Union and People's Alliance in the 1987 election.

== See also ==
- 1991 Navarrese regional election
