= 1999 Spanish local elections in Navarre =

This article presents the results breakdown of the local elections held in Navarre on 13 June 1999. The following tables show detailed results in the autonomous community's most populous municipalities, sorted alphabetically.

== City control ==
The following table lists party control in the most populous municipalities, including provincial capitals (highlighted in bold). Gains for a party are highlighted in that party's colour.

Municipality	Population	Previous control	New control
Barañain	20,182	Navarrese People's Union (UPN)	Independent Citizens for Barañain (CIB)
Burlada	15,860	Socialist Party of Navarre (PSN–PSOE)	Navarrese People's Union (UPN)
Estella	12,535	Socialist Party of Navarre (PSN–PSOE)	Navarrese People's Union (UPN)
**Pamplona**	179,145	Convergence of Democrats of Navarre (CDN)	Navarrese People's Union (UPN)
Tafalla	10,159	Navarrese People's Union (UPN)	Navarrese People's Union (UPN)
Tudela	27,188	Navarrese People's Union (UPN)	Navarrese People's Union (UPN)

== Municipalities ==
=== Barañain ===
Population: 20,182

← Summary of the 13 June 1999 City Council of Barañain election results →
Parties and alliances	Popular vote			Seats	
Parties and alliances	Votes	%	±pp	Total	+/−
Independent Citizens for Barañain (CIB)	2,434	26.81	+19.59	**6**	+5
Socialist Party of Navarre (PSN–PSOE)	2,239	24.66	+8.43	**6**	+3
Basque Citizens–United Cendea (EH–CU)^{1}	1,658	18.26	+2.22	**4**	+1
United Left (IU/EB)	1,009	11.11	−4.50	**2**	−1
Convergence of Democrats of Navarre (CDN)	860	9.47	−1.80	**2**	±0
Basque Solidarity–Basque Nationalist Party (EA–PNV)^{2}	512	5.64	−2.41	**1**	±0
Navarrese People's Union (UPN)	n/a	n/a	−22.85	0	−4
Blank ballots	367	4.04	+1.32		
**Total**	**9,079**			**21**	**+4**
Valid votes	9,079	99.22	−0.25		
Invalid votes	71	0.78	+0.25		
**Votes cast / turnout**	**9,150**	**58.21**	**−1.43**		
Abstentions	6,570	41.79	+1.43		
**Registered voters**	**15,720**				
Sources
Footnotes: ^{1} Basque Citizens–United Cendea results are compared to the combined totals of Popular Unity and United Cendea Assembly in the 1995 election.; ^{2} Basque Solidarity–Basque Nationalist Party results are compared to the combined totals of Basque Solidarity and Nationalists of Navarre in the 1995 election.

=== Burlada ===
Population: 15,860

← Summary of the 13 June 1999 City Council of Burlada election results →
Parties and alliances	Popular vote			Seats	
Parties and alliances	Votes	%	±pp	Total	+/−
Navarrese People's Union (UPN)	2,135	28.27	+3.22	**5**	±0
Basque Citizens (EH)^{1}	1,780	23.57	+5.46	**4**	+2
Socialist Party of Navarre (PSN–PSOE)	1,471	19.48	−1.70	**4**	±0
Unity of Independents of Burlada (UIB)	727	9.63	New	**2**	+2
United Left (IU/EB)	590	7.81	−5.87	**1**	−2
Convergence of Democrats of Navarre (CDN)	404	5.35	New	**1**	+1
Basque Solidarity–Basque Nationalist Party (EA–PNV)^{2}	233	3.09	−1.25	0	±0
Independents of Navarre (IN)	n/a	n/a	−14.93	0	−3
Blank ballots	212	2.81	+0.11		
**Total**	**7,552**			**17**	**±0**
Valid votes	7,552	99.30	+0.11		
Invalid votes	53	0.70	−0.11		
**Votes cast / turnout**	**7,605**	**55.55**	**−0.54**		
Abstentions	6,086	44.45	+0.54		
**Registered voters**	**13,691**				
Sources
Footnotes: ^{1} Basque Citizens results are compared to the combined totals of Popular Unity and Assembly in the 1995 election.; ^{2} Basque Solidarity–Basque Nationalist Party results are compared to Basque Solidarity totals in the 1995 election.

=== Estella ===
Population: 12,535

← Summary of the 13 June 1999 City Council of Estella election results →
Parties and alliances	Popular vote			Seats	
Parties and alliances	Votes	%	±pp	Total	+/−
Navarrese People's Union (UPN)	2,773	40.12	+2.08	**8**	+1
Socialist Party of Navarre (PSN–PSOE)	1,577	22.82	−6.62	**4**	−2
Basque Citizens–Unitary Candidacy of Estella (EH–CUE)^{1}	1,035	14.97	−4.81	**3**	±0
Basque Solidarity–Basque Nationalist Party (EA–PNV)^{2}	599	8.67	−1.97	**1**	±0
United Left (IU/EB)	594	8.59	New	**1**	+1
Convergence of Democrats of Navarre (CDN)	183	2.65	New	0	±0
Blank ballots	151	2.18	+0.07		
**Total**	**6,912**			**17**	**±0**
Valid votes	6,912	99.13	+0.34		
Invalid votes	61	0.87	−0.34		
**Votes cast / turnout**	**6,973**	**64.10**	**−1.71**		
Abstentions	3,905	35.90	+1.71		
**Registered voters**	**10,878**				
Sources
Footnotes: ^{1} Basque Citizens–Unitary Candidacy of Estella results are compared to the combined totals of Popular Unity and Unitary Candidacy of Estella in the 1995 election.; ^{2} Basque Solidarity–Basque Nationalist Party results are compared to the combined totals of Basque Solidarity and Nationalists of Navarre in the 1995 election.

=== Pamplona ===
Population: 179,145

← Summary of the 13 June 1999 City Council of Pamplona election results →
Parties and alliances	Popular vote			Seats	
Parties and alliances	Votes	%	±pp	Total	+/−
Navarrese People's Union (UPN)	39,026	40.60	+10.19	**12**	+2
Basque Citizens (EH)^{1}	18,465	19.21	+5.45	**6**	+3
Socialist Party of Navarre (PSN–PSOE)	14,193	14.76	−1.00	**4**	−1
Convergence of Democrats of Navarre (CDN)	9,506	9.89	−10.51	**3**	−3
United Left (IU/EB)	7,400	7.70	−3.87	**2**	−1
Basque Solidarity–Basque Nationalist Party (EA–PNV)^{2}	4,479	4.66	−0.97	0	±0
Independents of Navarre (IN)	594	0.62	New	0	±0
Humanist Party (PH)	223	0.23	New	0	±0
Carlist Party (EKA)	141	0.15	New	0	±0
Blank ballots	2,107	2.19	+0.12		
**Total**	**96,134**			**27**	**±0**
Valid votes	96,134	99.47	+0.05		
Invalid votes	516	0.53	−0.05		
**Votes cast / turnout**	**96,650**	**61.15**	**−3.38**		
Abstentions	61,397	38.85	+3.38		
**Registered voters**	**158,047**				
Sources
Footnotes: ^{1} Basque Citizens results are compared to the combined totals of Popular Unity and Assembly in the 1995 election.; ^{2} Basque Solidarity–Basque Nationalist Party results are compared to the combined totals of Basque Solidarity and Nationalists of Navarre in the 1995 election.

=== Tafalla ===
Population: 10,159

← Summary of the 13 June 1999 City Council of Tafalla election results →
Parties and alliances	Popular vote			Seats	
Parties and alliances	Votes	%	±pp	Total	+/−
Navarrese People's Union (UPN)	2,313	38.16	+1.25	**7**	±0
Socialist Party of Navarre (PSN–PSOE)	1,490	24.58	−5.07	**5**	−1
Basque Citizens (EH)^{1}	1,169	19.29	+3.17	**3**	±0
United Left (IU/EB)	476	7.85	+4.22	**1**	+1
Basque Solidarity–Basque Nationalist Party (EA–PNV)^{2}	378	6.24	−1.12	**1**	±0
Convergence of Democrats of Navarre (CDN)	146	2.41	New	0	±0
Blank ballots	89	1.47	−1.58		
**Total**	**6,061**			**17**	**±0**
Valid votes	6,061	99.44	+0.44		
Invalid votes	34	0.56	−0.44		
**Votes cast / turnout**	**6,095**	**69.46**	**−1.37**		
Abstentions	2,680	30.54	+1.37		
**Registered voters**	**8,775**				
Sources
Footnotes: ^{1} Basque Citizens results are compared to Popular Unity totals in the 1995 election.; ^{2} Basque Solidarity–Basque Nationalist Party results are compared to Basque Solidarity totals in the 1995 election.

=== Tudela ===
Population: 27,188

← Summary of the 13 June 1999 City Council of Tudela election results →
Parties and alliances	Popular vote			Seats	
Parties and alliances	Votes	%	±pp	Total	+/−
Navarrese People's Union (UPN)	7,206	47.67	+10.53	**12**	+2
Socialist Party of Navarre (PSN–PSOE)	3,844	25.43	+7.02	**6**	+1
Assembly–Basque Citizens (Batzarre–EH)^{1}	1,284	8.49	−3.80	**2**	±0
United Left (IU/EB)	1,053	6.97	−3.95	**1**	−1
Tuledan Union (UT)	725	4.80	−4.53	0	−2
Convergence of Democrats of Navarre (CDN)	401	2.65	+0.06	0	±0
Independent Labour Association (ALIT)	163	1.08	−0.45	0	±0
Blank ballots	440	2.91	+0.44		
**Total**	**15,116**			**21**	**±0**
Valid votes	15,116	98.80	−0.12		
Invalid votes	183	1.20	+0.12		
**Votes cast / turnout**	**15,299**	**67.21**	**−4.09**		
Abstentions	7,463	32.79	+4.09		
**Registered voters**	**22,762**				
Sources
Footnotes: ^{1} Assembly–Basque Citizens results are compared to the combined totals of Assembly and Popular Unity in the 1995 election.

== See also ==
- 1999 Navarrese regional election
