= 1983 Spanish local elections in Navarre =

This article presents the results breakdown of the local elections held in Navarre on 8 May 1983. The following tables show detailed results in the autonomous community's most populous municipalities, sorted alphabetically.

== City control ==
The following table lists party control in the most populous municipalities, including provincial capitals (highlighted in bold). Gains for a party are highlighted in that party's colour.

Municipality	Population	Previous control	New control
Burlada	14,519	Spanish Socialist Workers' Party (PSOE)	Spanish Socialist Workers' Party (PSOE)
Estella	12,230	Independent Group of Estella (AIE)	Independent Group of Estella (AIE)
**Pamplona**	177,906	Spanish Socialist Workers' Party (PSOE)	Spanish Socialist Workers' Party (PSOE)
Tafalla	9,957	People's Electoral Group (APE)	Spanish Socialist Workers' Party (PSOE)
Tudela	24,953	Spanish Socialist Workers' Party (PSOE)	Spanish Socialist Workers' Party (PSOE)

== Municipalities ==
=== Burlada ===
Population: 14,519

← Summary of the 8 May 1983 City Council of Burlada election results →
Parties and alliances	Popular vote			Seats	
Parties and alliances	Votes	%	±pp	Total	+/−
Spanish Socialist Workers' Party (PSOE)	2,932	50.82	+30.11	**9**	+5
Navarrese People's Union (UPN)	1,546	26.80	New	**4**	+4
Popular Unity (HB)	940	16.29	New	**3**	+3
Basque Nationalist Party (EAJ/PNV)	351	6.08	New	**1**	+1
Union of the Democratic Centre (UCD)	n/a	n/a	−36.60	0	−6
Independents (INDEP)	n/a	n/a	−29.59	0	−5
Navarrese Left Union (UNAI)	n/a	n/a	−7.38	0	−1
Communist Party of the Basque Country (PCE/EPK)	n/a	n/a	−5.72	0	−1
Blank ballots	0	0.00	±0.00		
**Total**	**5,769**			**17**	**±0**
Valid votes	5,769	100.00	+3.40		
Invalid votes	0	0.00	−3.40		
**Votes cast / turnout**	**5,769**	**59.75**	**−3.32**		
Abstentions	3,886	40.25	+3.32		
**Registered voters**	**9,655**				

=== Estella ===
Population: 12,230

← Summary of the 8 May 1983 City Council of Estella election results →
Parties and alliances	Popular vote			Seats	
Parties and alliances	Votes	%	±pp	Total	+/−
Independent Group of Estella (AIE)	2,308	38.64	−0.68	7	±0
Spanish Socialist Workers' Party (PSOE)	1,683	28.18	+18.61	5	+4
Popular Unity (HB)^{1}	955	15.99	−21.66	3	−4
Basque Nationalist Party (EAJ/PNV)	620	10.38	New	1	+1
Carlist Party (PC)	407	6.81	−3.46	1	−1
Blank ballots	0	0.00	±0		
**Total**	**5,973**			17	**±0**
Valid votes	5,973	100.00	+1.54		
Invalid votes	0	0.00	−1.54		
**Votes cast / turnout**	**5,973**	**66.18**	**−7.05**		
Abstentions	3,053	33.82	+7.05		
**Registered voters**	**9,026**				
Sources
Footnotes: ^{1} Popular Unity results are compared to Popular Unity Candidacy totals in the 1979 election.

=== Pamplona ===
Population: 177,906

← Summary of the 8 May 1983 City Council of Pamplona election results →
Parties and alliances	Popular vote			Seats	
Parties and alliances	Votes	%	±pp	Total	+/−
Spanish Socialist Workers' Party (PSOE)	30,503	35.73	+18.57	**11**	+6
Navarrese People's Union (UPN)	19,061	22.33	+7.23	**7**	+2
Popular Unity (HB)	12,138	14.22	−8.67	**4**	−3
People's Coalition (AP–PDP–UL)	11,484	13.45	New	**4**	+4
Basque Nationalist Party (EAJ/PNV)	5,223	6.12	−0.06	**1**	−1
Neighbourhood Labor (Auzolan)^{1}	2,892	3.39	−1.60	0	±0
Basque Country Left (EE)	2,667	3.12	+1.61	0	±0
Carlist Party (PC)	1,399	1.64	−1.84	0	±0
Union of the Democratic Centre (UCD)	n/a	n/a	−23.93	0	−8
Navarrese Left Union (UNAI)	n/a	n/a	−2.92	0	±0
Blank ballots	0	0.00	±0		
**Total**	**85,367**			**27**	**±0**
Valid votes	85,367	100.00	+1.37		
Invalid votes	0	0.00	−1.37		
**Votes cast / turnout**	**85,367**	**66.29**	**−0.02**		
Abstentions	43,405	33.71	+0.02		
**Registered voters**	**128,772**				
Sources
Footnotes: ^{1} Neighbourhood Labor results are compared to Left Navarrese Assembly totals in the 1979 election.

=== Tafalla ===
Population: 9,957

← Summary of the 8 May 1983 City Council of Tafalla election results →
Parties and alliances	Popular vote			Seats	
Parties and alliances	Votes	%	±pp	Total	+/−
Spanish Socialist Workers' Party (PSOE)	1,935	36.82	+12.34	**5**	+2
Tafallese People's Alliance (APT)	1,434	27.28	New	**4**	+4
Popular Unity (HB)^{1}	914	17.39	−13.71	**2**	−2
Carlist Party (PC)	357	6.79	New	**1**	+1
Basque Nationalist Party (EAJ/PNV)	341	6.49	−0.60	**1**	±0
Basque Country Left (EE)	275	5.23	New	0	±0
Union of the Democratic Centre (UCD)	n/a	n/a	−37.33	0	−5
Blank ballots	0	0.00	±0		
**Total**	**5,256**			**13**	**±0**
Valid votes	5,256	100.00	+1.10		
Invalid votes	0	0.00	−1.10		
**Votes cast / turnout**	**5,256**	**70.24**	**−5.19**		
Abstentions	2,227	29.76	+5.19		
**Registered voters**	**7,483**				
Sources
Footnotes: ^{1} Popular Unity results are compared to People's Electoral Group totals in the 1979 election.

=== Tudela ===
Population: 24,953

← Summary of the 8 May 1983 City Council of Tudela election results →
Parties and alliances	Popular vote			Seats	
Parties and alliances	Votes	%	±pp	Total	+/−
Spanish Socialist Workers' Party (PSOE)	6,419	48.63	+19.18	**12**	+5
People's Coalition (AP–PDP–UL)	2,539	19.23	New	**4**	+4
Navarrese People's Union (UPN)^{1}	1,796	13.61	−0.89	**3**	±0
Left Assembly of the Ribera (AIR)	856	6.48	New	**1**	+1
Carlist Party (PC)	705	5.34	+1.62	**1**	+1
Popular Unity (HB)	429	3.25	New	0	±0
Communist Party of the Basque Country (PCE/EPK)	270	2.05	−3.89	0	−1
Basque Country Left (EE)	187	1.42	New	0	±0
Union of the Democratic Centre (UCD)	n/a	n/a	−25.83	0	−6
Navarrese Left Union (UNAI)	n/a	n/a	−12.46	0	−3
Party of Labour of Spain (PTE)	n/a	n/a	−8.11	0	−1
Blank ballots	0	0.00	±0		
**Total**	**13,201**			**21**	**±0**
Valid votes	13,201	100.00	+1.77		
Invalid votes	0	0.00	−1.77		
**Votes cast / turnout**	**13,201**	**72.18**	**+0.38**		
Abstentions	5,087	27.82	−0.38		
**Registered voters**	**18,288**				
Sources
Footnotes: ^{1} Navarrese People's Union results are compared to Independent Tudelan Group totals in the 1979 election.

== See also ==
- 1983 Navarrese regional election
