= Government of Imanol Pradales =

- Government of the Basque Country
- 2024–present
- Date formed: 25 June 2024

People and organisations
- Monarch: Felipe VI
- Lehendakari: Imanol Pradales
- Vice Lehendakari: Ibone Bengoetxea^{1st}, Mikel Torres^{2nd}
- No. of ministers: 15 (Note: Does not include the Lehendakari.)
- Total no. of members: 16
- Member party: EAJ/PNV; PSE–EE
- Status in legislature: Majority coalition government
- Opposition party: EH Bildu
- Opposition leader: Pello Otxandiano

History
- Election: 2024 regional election
- Legislature term: 13th Parliament
- Predecessor: Urkullu III

The Pradales Government is the incumbent regional government of the Basque Country led by President (Lehendakari) Imanol Pradales. It was formed in June 2024 after the regional election.

== Council of Government ==
The Council of Government is structured into the offices for the president, the two vice presidents and 15 ministries.

← Pradales Government → (25 June 2024 – present)
Portfolio	Name	Party	Took office	Left office	Ref.
President	Imanol Pradales	EAJ/PNV	22 June 2024	Incumbent	
First Vice President; Minister of Culture and Language Policy	Ibone Bengoetxea	EAJ/PNV	25 June 2024	Incumbent	
Second Vice President; Minister of Economy, Labour and Employment	Mikel Torres	PSE–EE	25 June 2024	Incumbent	
Minister of Treasury and Finance	Noël d'Anjou	EAJ/PNV	25 June 2024	Incumbent	
Minister of Governance, Digital Administration and Self-Government; Spokesperson of the Government	María Ubarretxena	EAJ/PNV	25 June 2024	Incumbent	
Minister of Industry, Energy Transition and Sustainability	Mikel Jauregi	EAJ/PNV	25 June 2024	Incumbent	
Minister of Security	Bingen Zupiria	EAJ/PNV	25 June 2024	Incumbent	
Minister of Education	Begoña Pedrosa	EAJ/PNV (Ind.)	25 June 2024	Incumbent	
Minister of Housing and Urban Agenda	Denis Itxaso	PSE–EE	25 June 2024	Incumbent	
Minister of Health	Alberto Martínez	EAJ/PNV	25 June 2024	Incumbent	
Minister of Welfare, Youth and the Demographic Challenge	Nerea Melgosa	EAJ/PNV	25 June 2024	Incumbent	
Minister of Sustainable Mobility	Susana García	PSE–EE	25 June 2024	Incumbent	
Minister of Science, Universities and Innovation	Juan Ignacio Pérez Iglesias	EAJ/PNV (Ind.)	25 June 2024	Incumbent	
Minister of Tourism, Trade and Consumer Affairs	Javier Hurtado	PSE–EE	25 June 2024	Incumbent	
Minister of Food, Rural Development, Agriculture and Fisheries	Amaia Barredo	EAJ/PNV	25 June 2024	Incumbent	
Minister of Justice and Human Rights	María Jesús San José	PSE–EE	25 June 2024	Incumbent	
