= Department of Health (Basque Country) =

Government ministry of the Basque Country, Spain

- Osasun Saila (Basque); Departamento de Salud (Spanish)

Agency overview
- Formed: 4 November 1936; 89 years ago
- Preceding agency: Department of Health and Consumer Affairs
- Jurisdiction: Basque Government
- Minister responsible: Alberto Martínez
- Website: Departamento de Salud (in Spanish)

The Department of Health (Basque: Osasun Saila, Spanish: Departamento de Salud) is the department of the Basque Government responsible for the public health care system of the Basque Autonomous Community.

== List of officeholders ==
| Portrait | Name (Birth–Death) | Term of office | | | Party | Government | Lehendakari (Tenure) | Ref. |
| Portrait | Name (Birth–Death) | Took office | Left office | Duration | Party | Government | Lehendakari (Tenure) | Ref. |
|---|---|---|---|---|---|---|---|---|
Department of Health (Provisional Government of the Basque Country)
| | Alfredo Espinosa (1903–1937) | 9 October 1936 | 26 June 1937 | 260 days | UR | Provisional | José Antonio Aguirre (1936–1960) | |
| | Eliodoro de la Torre (1889–1946) | 1937 | 28 January 1946 | | EAJ/PNV | Provisional | José Antonio Aguirre (1936–1960) | |
| | Manuel Campomanes (?–?) | 1946 | 1960 | | UR | Provisional | José Antonio Aguirre (1936–1960) | |
Department of Health (Basque General Council)
| | Andoni Monforte (born 1946) | 24 February 1978 | 9 April 1980 | 2 years, 45 days | PSE-EE | Rubial | Ramón Rubial (1978–1979) | |
| | Andoni Monforte (born 1946) | 24 February 1978 | 9 April 1980 | 2 years, 45 days | PSE-EE | Garaikoetxea I | Carlos Garaikoetxea (1979–1985) | |
| Department of Health | | | | | | | Carlos Garaikoetxea (1979–1985) | |
| | Jesús Javier Aguirre (1934–2022) | 30 April 1980 | 18 April 1984 | 3 years, 354 days | EAJ/PNV | Garaikoetxea II | Carlos Garaikoetxea (1979–1985) | |
| | Ángel Larrañaga (born 1946) | 18 April 1984 | 28 January 1985 | 285 days | EAJ/PNV | Garaikoetxea III | Carlos Garaikoetxea (1979–1985) | |
Department of Labor, Health and Social Security
| | Jon Imanol Azúa (born 1953) | 28 January 1985 | 12 March 1987 | 2 years, 43 days | EAJ/PNV | Ardanza I | José Antonio Ardanza (1985–1999) | |
| Department of Health and Consumer Affairs | | | | | | | José Antonio Ardanza (1985–1999) | |
| | José Manuel Freire (born 1949) | 12 March 1987 | 7 February 1991 | 3 years, 332 days | PSE-EE | Ardanza II | José Antonio Ardanza (1985–1999) | |
| Department of Health | | | | | | | José Antonio Ardanza (1985–1999) | |
| | Iñaki Azkuna (1943–2014) | 7 February 1991 | 4 January 1995 | 8 years, 72 days | EAJ/PNV | Ardanza III | José Antonio Ardanza (1985–1999) | |
| | Iñaki Azkuna (1943–2014) | 4 January 1995 | 7 January 1999 | 8 years, 72 days | EAJ/PNV | Ardanza IV | José Antonio Ardanza (1985–1999) | |
| | Iñaki Azkuna (1943–2014) | 7 January 1999 | 20 April 1999 | 8 years, 72 days | EAJ/PNV | Ibarretxe I | Juan José Ibarretxe (1999–2009) | |
| | Gabriel María Inclán (born 1959) | 20 April 1999 | 17 July 2001 | 10 years, 19 days | EAJ/PNV | Ibarretxe I | Juan José Ibarretxe (1999–2009) | |
| | Gabriel María Inclán (born 1959) | 17 July 2001 | 28 June 2005 | 10 years, 19 days | EAJ/PNV | Ibarretxe II | Juan José Ibarretxe (1999–2009) | |
| | Gabriel María Inclán (born 1959) | 28 June 2005 | 9 May 2009 | 10 years, 19 days | EAJ/PNV | Ibarretxe III | Juan José Ibarretxe (1999–2009) | |
Department of Health and Consumer Affairs
| | Rafael Bengoa (born 1952) | 9 May 2009 | 17 December 2012 | 3 years, 222 days | PSE-EE | López | Patxi López (2009–2012) | |
Department of Health
| sinmarco | Jon Darpón (born 1959) | 17 December 2012 | 28 November 2016 | 6 years, 87 days | EAJ/PNV | Urkullu I | Iñigo Urkullu (2012–2024) | |
| sinmarco | Jon Darpón (born 1959) | 28 November 2016 | 14 March 2019 | 6 years, 87 days | EAJ/PNV | Urkullu II | Iñigo Urkullu (2012–2024) | |
| sinmarco | Nekane Murga (born 1963) | 14 March 2019 | 8 September 2020 | 1 year, 178 days | EAJ/PNV | Urkullu II | Iñigo Urkullu (2012–2024) | |
| sinmarco | Gotzone Sagardui (born 1981) | 8 September 2020 | 25 June 2024 | 3 years, 291 days | EAJ/PNV | Urkullu III | Iñigo Urkullu (2012–2024) | |
| | Alberto Martínez (born ?) | 25 June 2024 | Incumbent | 2 years, 44 days | EAJ/PNV | Pradales | Imanol Pradales (2024–present) | |
