= Third government of Iñigo Urkullu =

3rd government of Iñigo Urkullu
- Government of the Basque Country
- 2020–2024
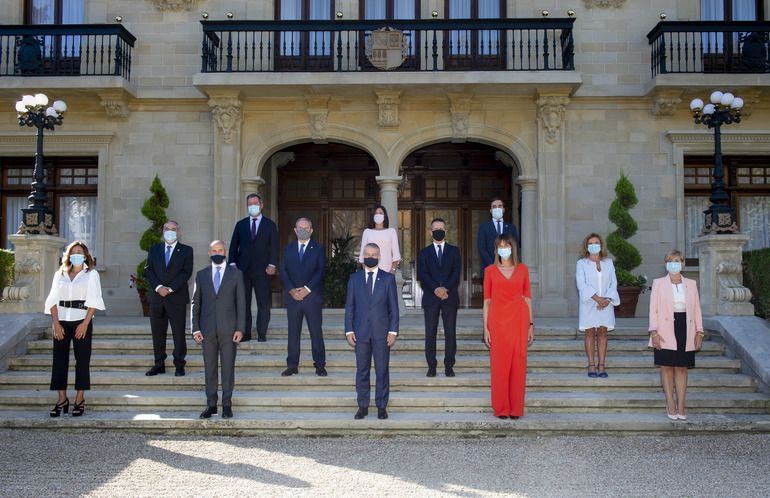
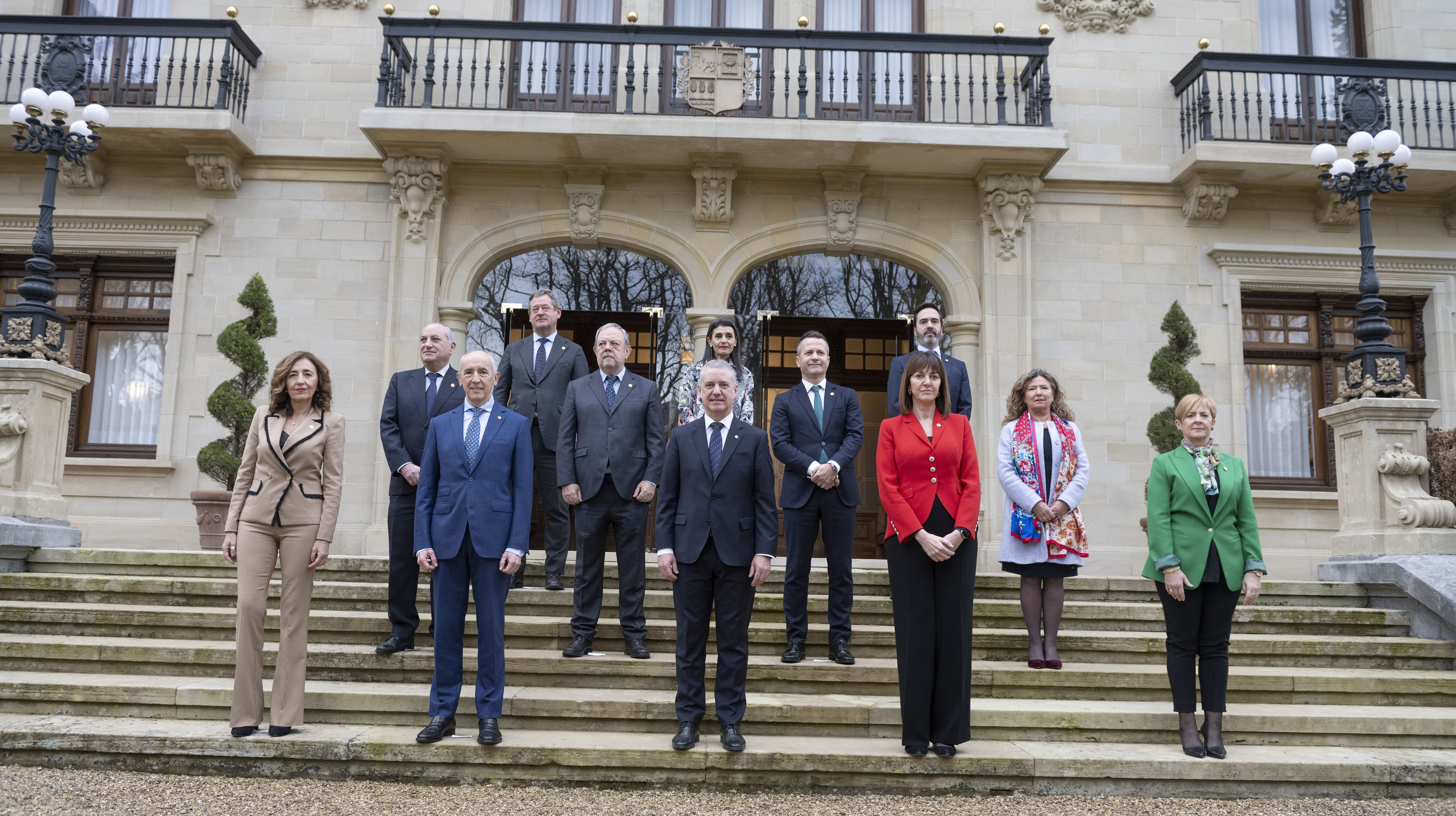
- The government in September 2020 (left) and February 2023 (right).
- Date formed: 8 September 2020
- Date dissolved: 25 June 2024

People and organisations
- Monarch: Felipe VI
- Lehendakari: Iñigo Urkullu
- Vice Lehendakari: Josu Erkoreka^{1st}, Idoia Mendia^{2nd}
- No. of ministers: 11 (Note: Does not include the Lehendakari.)
- Total no. of members: 12
- Member party: EAJ/PNV; PSE–EE
- Status in legislature: Majority coalition government
- Opposition party: EH Bildu
- Opposition leader: Maddalen Iriarte (2020–2023); Nerea Kortajarena (2023–present)

History
- Election: 2020 regional election
- Legislature term: 12th Parliament
- Predecessor: Urkullu II
- Successor: Pradales

The Third Urkullu Government was the regional government of the Basque Country led by President (Lehendakari) Iñigo Urkullu between 2020 and 2024. It was formed in September 2020 after the regional election.

== Council of Government ==
The Council of Government was structured into the offices for the president, the two vice presidents and 11 ministries.

← Urkullu III Government → (5 September 2020 – 25 June 2024)
Portfolio	Name	Party	Took office	Left office	Ref.
President	Iñigo Urkullu	EAJ/PNV	5 September 2020	22 June 2024	
First Vice President; Minister of Security	Josu Erkoreka	EAJ/PNV	8 September 2020	25 June 2024	
Second Vice President; Minister of Labour and Employment	Idoia Mendia	PSE–EE	8 September 2020	30 April 2024	
Minister of Public Governance and Self-Government	Olatz Garamendi	EAJ/PNV	8 September 2020	25 June 2024	
Minister of Economic Development, Sustainability and Environment	Arantxa Tapia	EAJ/PNV	8 September 2020	25 June 2024	
Minister of Economy and Finance	Pedro Azpiazu	EAJ/PNV	8 September 2020	25 June 2024	
Minister of Education	Jokin Bildarratz	EAJ/PNV	8 September 2020	25 June 2024	
Minister of Territorial Planning, Housing and Transport	Iñaki Arriola	PSE–EE	8 September 2020	25 June 2024	
Minister of Health	Gotzone Sagardui	EAJ/PNV	8 September 2020	25 June 2024	
Minister of Equality, Justice and Social Policies	Beatriz Artolazabal	EAJ/PNV	8 September 2020	14 February 2023	
Minister of Culture and Language Policy; Spokesperson of the Government	Bingen Zupiria	EAJ/PNV	8 September 2020	25 June 2025	
Minister of Tourism, Trade and Consumer Affairs	Javier Hurtado	PSE–EE	8 September 2020	25 June 2024	
=== Changes February 2023 ===
Portfolio	Name	Party	Took office	Left office	Ref.
Minister of Equality, Justice and Social Policies	Nerea Melgosa	EAJ/PNV	14 February 2023	25 June 2024	
=== Changes April 2024 ===
Portfolio	Name	Party	Took office	Left office	Ref.
Second Vice President	Iñaki Arriola was temporarily entrusted with the office's portfolio since 30 April 2024.				
Minister of Labour and Employment	Javier Hurtado was temporarily entrusted with the office's portfolio since 30 April 2024.				

== Departmental structure ==
Iñigo Urkullu's government was organised into several superior and governing units, whose number, powers and hierarchical structure may vary depending on the ministerial department.

Unit/body rank

- (■) Director-general
- (■) Service

Office (Original name)	Portrait	Name	Took office	Left office	Alliance/party	Ref.
=== Presidency ===
Presidency (Lehendakaritza)		Iñigo Urkullu	5 September 2020	22 June 2024	EAJ/PNV	
First Vice Presidency (Lehenengo Lehendakariordetza)		Josu Erkoreka	8 September 2020	25 June 2024	EAJ/PNV	
First Vice Presidency (Lehenengo Lehendakariordetza)	See Department of Security					
Second Vice Presidency (Bigarren Lehendakariordetza)		Idoia Mendia	8 September 2020	30 April 2024	PSE–EE	
Second Vice Presidency (Bigarren Lehendakariordetza)		Iñaki Arriola (temporary entrustment)	30 April 2024	25 June 2024	PSE–EE	
Second Vice Presidency (Bigarren Lehendakariordetza)	See Department of Labour and Employment (8 September 2020 – 30 April 2024); See Department Territorial Planning, Housing and Transport (30 April 2024 – present)					
=== Department of Security ===
Department of Security (Segurtasun Saila)		Josu Erkoreka	8 September 2020	25 June 2024	EAJ/PNV	
Department of Security (Segurtasun Saila)	29 January 2021 – present: (■) Directorate of the Cabinet of the First Vice President and Minister of Security; (■) Directorate of Communication of the First Vice President and Minister of Security; (■) Deputy Office of Administration and Services; (■) Directorate of Economic Management and General Resources; (■) Directorate of Legal Regime, Services and Electoral Processes; (■) Directorate of Human Resources; (■) Directorate of Telecommunications and IT Systems Management; (■) Deputy Office of Security; (■) Directorate of Emergency Attention and Meteorology; (■) Directorate of Gambling and Show; (■) Directorate of Traffic; (■) Directorate of the Ertzaintza; (■) Directorate of Security Coordination					
=== Department of Labour and Employment ===
Department of Labour and Employment (Lan eta Enplegu Saila)		Idoia Mendia	8 September 2020	30 April 2024	PSE–EE	
Department of Labour and Employment (Lan eta Enplegu Saila)		Javier Hurtado (temporary entrustment)	30 April 2024	25 June 2024	PSE–EE	
Department of Labour and Employment (Lan eta Enplegu Saila)	29 January 2021 – present: (■) Directorate of Services; (■) Directorate of Cabinet; (■) Directorate of Communication; (■) Deputy Office of Labour and Social Security; (■) Directorate of Labour and Social Security; (■) Directorate of Social Economy; (■) Deputy Office of Employment and Inclusion; (■) Directorate of Employment and Inclusion					
=== Department of Public Governance and Self-Government ===
Department of Public Governance and Self-Government (Gobernantza Publiko eta Autogobernu Saila)		Olatz Garamendi	8 September 2020	Incumbent	EAJ/PNV	
Department of Public Governance and Self-Government (Gobernantza Publiko eta Autogobernu Saila)	29 January 2021 – present: (■) Directorate of Services; (■) Directorate of Cabinet; (■) Directorate of Self-Government; (■) Deputy Office of Institutional Relations; (■) Directorate of the Government Secretariat and Relations with the Parliament; (■) Directorate of Relations with Local Administrations and Administrative Records; (■) Directorate of Citizen Attention and Digital Services; (■) Directorate of Open Government; (■) Deputy Office of Legal Regime; (■) Directorate of Litigation; (■) Directorate of Legislative Development and Regulatory Control; (■) Deputy Office of Civil Service; (■) Directorate of Civil Service; (■) Directorate of Labour Relations; (■) Deputy Office of Administration and General Services; (■) Directorate of Information and communications technology; (■) Directorate of General Resources					
=== Department of Economic Development, Sustainability and Environment ===
Department of Economic Development, Sustainability and Environment (Ekonomiaren Garapen, Jasangarritasun eta Ingurumen Saila)		Arantxa Tapia	8 September 2020	25 June 2024	EAJ/PNV	
Department of Economic Development, Sustainability and Environment (Ekonomiaren Garapen, Jasangarritasun eta Ingurumen Saila)	5 March 2021 – present: (■) Directorate of Cabinet and Communication; (■) Directorate of the Services; (■) Deputy Office of Technology, Innovation and Digital Transformation; (■) Directorate of Technology and Innovation; (■) Directorate of Digital Transformation and Entrepreneurship; (■) Deputy Office of Industry; (■) Directorate of Industry and Energetic Transition; (■) Directorate of Strategic Projects and Industrial Administration; (■) Directorate of Ports and Maritime Affairs; (■) Deputy Office of Agriculture, Fisheries and Food Policy; (■) Directorate of Rural and Coastal Development and European Policies; (■) Directorate of Agriculture and Livestock; (■) Directorate of Fisheries and Aquaculture; (■) Directorate of Quality and Food Industries; (■) Deputy Office of Environmental Sustainability; (■) Directorate of Environmental Quality and Circular Economy; (■) Directorate of Natural Heritage and Climate Change					
=== Department of Economy and Finance ===
Department of Economy and Finance (Ekonomia eta Ogasun Saila)		Pedro Azpiazu	8 September 2020	25 June 2024	EAJ/PNV	
Department of Economy and Finance (Ekonomia eta Ogasun Saila)	5 March 2021 – present: (■) Directorate of Cabinet and Communication; (■) Directorate of Services; (■) Office of Economic Control; (■) Deputy Office of Economy and European Funds; (■) Directorate of Economy and Planning; (■) Directorate of Cohesion Policy and European Funds; (■) Deputy Office of Finance; (■) Directorate of Tax Administration; (■) Directorate of Estate and Contracting; (■) Directorate of Institutional Resources; (■) Deputy Office of Finance and Budget; (■) Directorate of Financial Policy; (■) Directorate of Budget					
=== Department of Education ===
Department of Education (Hezkuntza Saila)		Jokin Bildarratz	8 September 2020	25 June 2024	EAJ/PNV	
Department of Education (Hezkuntza Saila)	5 March 2021 – present: (■) Directorate of Cabinet and Communication; (■) Deputy Office of Administration and Services; (■) Directorate of Economic Management; (■) Directorate of Personnel Management; (■) Directorate of Infrastructures, Resources and Technologies; (■) Directorate of Legal Regime and Services; (■) Deputy Office of Education; (■) Directorate for Diversity and Educational Inclusion; (■) Directorate of Learning and Educational Innovation; (■) Directorate of Facilities and Planning; (■) Deputy Office of Vocational Training; (■) Directorate of Planning and Organization; (■) Directorate of Technology and Advanced Learning; (■) Deputy Office of Universities and Research; (■) Directorate of Research; (■) Directorate of University Policy and Coordination					
=== Department Territorial Planning, Housing and Transport ===
Department Territorial Planning, Housing and Transport (Lurralde Plangintza, Etxebizitza eta Garraio Saila)		Iñaki Arriola	8 September 2020	25 June 2024	PSE–EE	
Department Territorial Planning, Housing and Transport (Lurralde Plangintza, Etxebizitza eta Garraio Saila)	29 January 2021 – present: (■) Directorate of Cabinet; (■) Directorate of Services; (■) Deputy Office of Territorial Planning and Urban Agenda; (■) Directorate of Territorial Planning and Urban Agenda; (■) Deputy Office of Housing; (■) Directorate of Housing, Land and Architecture; (■) Directorate of Housing Planning and Operational Processes; (■) Deputy Office of Infrastructures and Transportation; (■) Directorate of Transportation Planning; (■) Directorate of Transportation Infrastructure					
=== Department of Health ===
Department of Health (Osasun Saila)		Gotzone Sagardui	8 September 2020	25 June 2024	EAJ/PNV	
Department of Health (Osasun Saila)	31 March 2021 – present: (■) Directorate of the Cabinet of the Minister of Health; (■) Deputy Office of Health; (■) Directorate of Public Health and Addictions; (■) Directorate of Health Planning, Management and Evaluation; (■) Directorate of Health Research and Innovation; (■) Directorate of Socio-Health Care; (■) Deputy Office of Health Administration and Finance; (■) Directorate of Legal, Economic and General Services; (■) Directorate of Health Insurance and Procurement; (■) Directorate of Pharmacy					
=== Department of Equality, Justice and Social Policies ===
Department of Equality, Justice and Social Policies (Berdintasun, Justizia eta Gizarte Politiketako Saila)		Beatriz Artolazabal	8 September 2020	14 February 2023	EAJ/PNV	
Department of Equality, Justice and Social Policies (Berdintasun, Justizia eta Gizarte Politiketako Saila)		Nerea Melgosa	14 February 2023	25 June 2024	EAJ/PNV	
Department of Equality, Justice and Social Policies (Berdintasun, Justizia eta Gizarte Politiketako Saila)	29 January 2021 – present: (■) Directorate of Cabinet; (■) Directorate of Communication; (■) Directorate of Services; (■) Deputy Office of Justice; (■) Directorate of the Justice Administration; (■) Directorate of Digital Justice and Infrastructure; (■) Directorate of Justice; (■) Deputy Office of Social Policies; (■) Directorate of Social Services; (■) Directorate of Families and Childhood; (■) Directorate of Migration and Asylum; (■) Deputy Office of Human Rights, Memory and Cooperation; (■) Directorate of Human Rights, Victims and Diversity					
=== Department of Culture and Language Policy ===
Department of Culture and Language Policy (Kultura eta Hizkuntza Politika Saila)		Bingen Zupiria	8 September 2020	25 June 2024	EAJ/PNV	
Department of Culture and Language Policy (Kultura eta Hizkuntza Politika Saila)	5 March 2021 – present: (■) Directorate of the Cabinet and Social Media; (■) Directorate of Services; (■) Directorate of Physical Activity and Sport; (■) Deputy Office of Culture; (■) Directorate of Cultural Heritage; (■) Directorate of Promotion of Culture; (■) Deputy Office of Language Policy; (■) Directorate Linguistic Standardisation of Public Administrations; (■) Directorate of Promotion of the Basque Language; (■) Directorate of Linguistic Research and Coordination					
=== Department of Tourism, Trade and Consumer Affairs ===
Department of Tourism, Trade and Consumer Affairs (Turismo, Merkataritza eta Kontsumo Saila)		Javier Hurtado	8 September 2020	25 June 2024	PSE–EE	
Department of Tourism, Trade and Consumer Affairs (Turismo, Merkataritza eta Kontsumo Saila)	29 January 2021 – present: (■) Directorate of Cabinet and Communication; (■) Directorate of Services; (■) Deputy Office of Tourism and Trade; (■) Directorate of Tourism and Hospitality; (■) Directorate of Digital Justice and Infrastructure; (■) Directorate of Trade					
=== Spokesperson of the Government ===
Spokesperson of the Government (Gobernuaren Bozeramailea)		Bingen Zupiria	8 September 2020	25 June 2024	EAJ/PNV	
Spokesperson of the Government (Gobernuaren Bozeramailea)	See Department of Culture and Language Policy					
