= List of lehendakaris =

The president of the autonomous government of the Basque Country, Spain is referred to as Eusko Jaurlaritzako lehendakaria in Basque ("president of the Basque Government"). The correspondent title in Spanish is Presidente del Gobierno Vasco and, since recently, lehendakari or the Spanish form lendakari.

== List of lehendakaris ==
=== Second Republic and exile (1936–1979) ===
Governments

- War cabinet/Government in exile

Portrait	Name (Birth–Death)	Term of office			Party	Government Composition	Election	President (Tenure)	Ref.
Portrait	Name (Birth–Death)	Took office	Left office	Duration	Party	Government Composition	Election	President (Tenure)	Ref.
	José Antonio Aguirre (1904–1960)	7 October 1936	22 March 1960†	23 years and 167 days	EAJ/PNV	Provisional; PNV–PSOE–IR–ANV– PCE until 1952; UR until 1960	N/A	President; Manuel Azaña (1936–1939)	
	José Antonio Aguirre (1904–1960)	7 October 1936	22 March 1960†	23 years and 167 days	EAJ/PNV	Provisional; PNV–PSOE–IR–ANV– PCE until 1952; UR until 1960	N/A	Spanish Republican government in exile (1939–1977)	
	Jesús María de Leizaola (1896–1989)	22 March 1960	16 December 1979	19 years and 269 days	EAJ/PNV	Provisional; PNV–PSOE–IR–ANV– PCE until 1952; UR until 1960	N/A	Spanish Republican government in exile (1939–1977)	

=== Restored autonomy (1978–present) ===
Governments

- PNV
- PSE/PSE–EE
- Mixed coalition

Portrait	Name (Birth–Death)	Term of office			Party	Government Composition	Election	Monarch (Reign)	Ref.
Portrait	Name (Birth–Death)	Took office	Left office	Duration	Party	Government Composition	Election	Monarch (Reign)	Ref.
	Ramón Rubial (1906–1999)	17 February 1978	9 June 1979	1 year and 112 days	PSE–PSOE	Rubial; PNV–PSE–UCD–EE	N/A	King; Juan Carlos I (1975–2014)	
	Carlos Garaikoetxea (1938–2026)	9 June 1979	15 April 1980	5 years and 231 days	EAJ/PNV	Garaikoetxea I PNV–PSE–UCD–EE	N/A	King; Juan Carlos I (1975–2014)	
	Carlos Garaikoetxea (1938–2026)	15 April 1980	18 April 1984	5 years and 231 days	EAJ/PNV	Garaikoetxea II; PNV	1980	King; Juan Carlos I (1975–2014)	
	Carlos Garaikoetxea (1938–2026)	18 April 1984	26 January 1985	5 years and 231 days	EAJ/PNV	Garaikoetxea III; PNV	1984	King; Juan Carlos I (1975–2014)	
	José Antonio Ardanza (1941–2024)	26 January 1985	28 February 1987	13 years and 341 days	EAJ/PNV	Ardanza I PNV	1984	King; Juan Carlos I (1975–2014)	
	José Antonio Ardanza (1941–2024)	28 February 1987	2 February 1991	13 years and 341 days	EAJ/PNV	Ardanza II; PNV–PSE	1986	King; Juan Carlos I (1975–2014)	
	José Antonio Ardanza (1941–2024)	2 February 1991	31 December 1994	13 years and 341 days	EAJ/PNV	Ardanza III; PNV–EA–EE until Oct 1991; PNV–PSE from Oct 1991	1990	King; Juan Carlos I (1975–2014)	
	José Antonio Ardanza (1941–2024)	31 December 1994	2 January 1999	13 years and 341 days	EAJ/PNV	Ardanza IV; PNV–PSE–EE–EA until Jul 1998; PNV–EA from Jul 1998	1994	King; Juan Carlos I (1975–2014)	
	Juan José Ibarretxe (born 1957)	2 January 1999	14 July 2001	10 years and 125 days	EAJ/PNV	Ibarretxe I PNV–EA	1998	King; Juan Carlos I (1975–2014)	
	Juan José Ibarretxe (born 1957)	14 July 2001	25 June 2005	10 years and 125 days	EAJ/PNV	Ibarretxe II; PNV–EA until Sep 2001; PNV–EA–IU–EB from Sep 2001	2001	King; Juan Carlos I (1975–2014)	
	Juan José Ibarretxe (born 1957)	25 June 2005	7 May 2009	10 years and 125 days	EAJ/PNV	Ibarretxe III; PNV–EA–EB–B	2005	King; Juan Carlos I (1975–2014)	
	Patxi López (born 1959)	7 May 2009	15 December 2012	3 years and 222 days	PSE–EE (PSOE)	López; PSE–EE	2009	King; Juan Carlos I (1975–2014)	
	Iñigo Urkullu (born 1961)	15 December 2012	26 November 2016	11 years and 190 days	EAJ/PNV	Urkullu I PNV	2012	King; Juan Carlos I (1975–2014)	
	Iñigo Urkullu (born 1961)	15 December 2012	26 November 2016	11 years and 190 days	EAJ/PNV	Urkullu I PNV	2012	King; Felipe VI (2014–present)	
	Iñigo Urkullu (born 1961)	26 November 2016	5 September 2020	11 years and 190 days	EAJ/PNV	Urkullu II; PNV–PSE–EE	2016	King; Felipe VI (2014–present)	
	Iñigo Urkullu (born 1961)	5 September 2020	22 June 2024	11 years and 190 days	EAJ/PNV	Urkullu III; PNV–PSE–EE	2020	King; Felipe VI (2014–present)	
	Imanol Pradales (born 1975)	22 June 2024	Incumbent	1 year and 316 days	EAJ/PNV	Pradales; PNV–PSE–EE	2024	King; Felipe VI (2014–present)	

== See also ==
- Lehendakari
- Basque Government
- Ajuria Enea
