= Olatz Garamendi =

Spanish politician (born 1968)

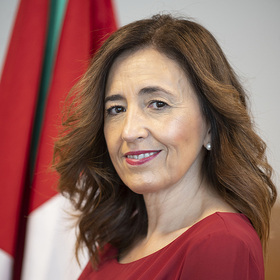
- Olatz Garamendi in 2021

Minister of Public Governance and Self-Government
- In office 8 September 2020 – 25 June 2024
- President: Iñigo Urkullu
- Preceded by: Josu Erkoreka
- Succeeded by: Maria Ubarretxena (as Minister of Governance, Digital Administration and Self-Government)

Deputy Minister of Administration and Services Ministry of Education
- In office 27 November 2016 – 7 September 2020
- President: Iñigo Urkullu
- Preceded by: Herself (Ministry of Education, Language Policy and Culture)
- Succeeded by: Patxi Xabier Aizpurua

Deputy Minister of Administration and Services Ministry of Education, Language Policy and Culture
- In office 27 December 2012 – 26 November 2016
- President: Iñigo Urkullu
- Preceded by: María Soledad Esteban (Ministry of Education, Universities and Research)
- Succeeded by: Herself (Ministry of Education)

Personal details
- Born: Olatz Garamendi Landa; 1968 (age 57–58) Ea, Biscay
- Party: Basque National Party
- Education: Law
- Alma mater: University of Deusto
- Occupation: Civil servant
- Website: Personal Twitter

Olatz Garamendi Landa (born 1968) is a Spanish politician affiliated with the Basque National Party. From 2020 to 2024, she served as Minister of Public Governance and Self-Government in the Third Urkullu Government led by Iñigo Urkullu.

== Career ==
She was born in Ea, Biscay in 1968. She holds a degree in law from the University of Deusto, graduating in 1991. In 2010, she earned a Diploma in Administrative Contracts from the same university.

She is a civil servant of the Basque Government. She worked as a legal counselor for the Basque Government from 1993 to 2006. In 2006, she became the head of the legal advice service of the Basque Government's Ministry of Culture, an office she held for three years until 2009. From 2009 to 2012 she was the Assistant Manager of Infrastructures and Recruitment of the University of the Basque Country.

In 2012, she was named Deputy Minister of Administration and Services of the Basque Government's Ministry of Education, Language Policy and Culture, serving under minister Cristina Uriarte. She was a deputy minister for 8 years, until 2020. For her second term as deputy minister (2016-2020), Uriarte's ministry was changed to Ministry of Education. She was the ministry's representative and negotiator for talks with education unions.

After the 2020 Basque regional election, Garamendi was named Minister of Public Governance and Self-Government in the Third Urkullu Government led by Iñigo Urkullu. She was tasked with negotiating the fulfilment of the Basque Statute of Autonomy with the Government of Spain.
