= Arantxa Tapia =

Spanish politician (born 1963)

The Honourable Arantxa Tapia Minister of the Basque Government
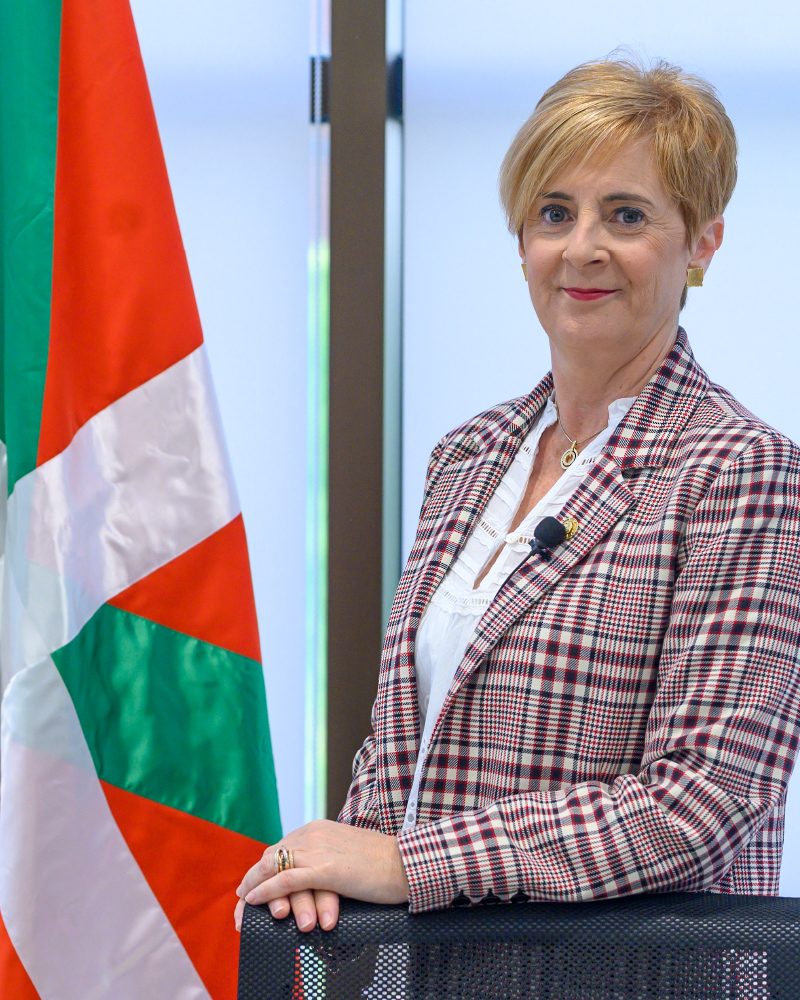
- Official portrait, 2020

Minister of Economic Development, Sustainability and the Environment
- Incumbent
- Assumed office 08 September 2020
- President: Iñigo Urkullu

Personal details
- Born: María Aranzazu Tapia Otaegi; 24 September 1963 (age 62) Astigarraga, Gipuzkoa, Basque Country
- Citizenship: Spanish
- Party: Basque Nationalist Party
- Spouse: Julián Flórez
- Children: Two
- Education: University of Navarre
- Website: Basque Government's website

Arantxa Tapia (born 1963) is a Spanish politician affiliated with the Basque Nationalist Party.

From December 2012 to November 2016, she served as Minister for Economic Development and Competitiveness in the First Urkullu Government led by Iñigo Urkullu. From November 2016 to September 2020, she served as Minister for Economic Development and Infrastructures in the Second Urkullu Government led by Iñigo Urkullu. As of 8 September 2020, she serves as Minister for Economic Development, Sustainability and the Environment in the Third Urkullu Government.
