= Beatriz Artolazabal =

Spanish politician

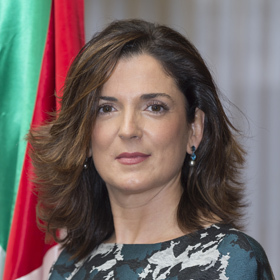
- Artolazabal in 2016

Minister of Equality, Justice and Social Policies
- In office 8 September 2020 – 14 February 2023
- President: Iñigo Urkullu
- Preceded by: Herself (as Minister of Employment and Social Policies); María Jesús San José (as Minister of Labour and Justice)
- Succeeded by: Nerea Melgosa

Minister of Employment and Social Policies
- In office 26 November 2016 – 7 September 2020
- President: Iñigo Urkullu
- Preceded by: Ángel Toña
- Succeeded by: Herself (as Minister of Equality, Justice and Social Policies); Idoia Mendia (as Minister of Labour and Employment)

Deputy of Social Services
- In office 6 July 2015 – 28 November 2016
- Deputy General: Ramiro González
- Preceded by: Marta Alaña
- Succeeded by: Marian Olabarrieta

Economic Manager of Osakidetza
- In office 17 January 2013 – 6 July 2015
- Preceded by: Iñaki Unzaga
- Succeeded by: Ricardo Ituarte

Member of the Vitoria-Gasteiz City Council
- In office 22 December 2000 – 16 June 2007
- Preceded by: Pedro Ignacio Elosegi
- Parliamentary group: PNV–EA

Personal details
- Born: Beatriz Artolazabal Albeniz; 1970 (age 55–56) Vitoria-Gasteiz
- Party: Basque National Party
- Education: Economics
- Alma mater: University of the Basque Country

Beatriz Artolazabal is a Spanish politician affiliated with the Basque National Party. From 28 November 2016 to 8 September 2020, she served as Minister for Employment and Social Policies in the Second Urkullu Government. From 8 September 2020 to 14 February 2023, she served as Minister of Equality, Justice and Social Policies in the Third Urkullu Government led by Iñigo Urkullu.

== Early life and education ==
She was born in Vitoria-Gasteiz in 1970. She holds a degree in Economy and Business Administration from the University of the Basque Country, specialising in International Economy and Development.

== Career ==
She worked as administrative officer for various companies. From 1995 to 1996 she worked on computer and administrative tasks for Gizaker S.L., and in 1998 she realised an internship in Guascor I+D. She later worked as administrative officer and salesperson in Astilan, a company of Sormen Group, from 1998 to 1999. In 1999 she joined Logic Control S.A., where she was the sales manager until 2000.

In 2000, she became a councillor of the City Council of Vitoria-Gasteiz. She contested the 1999 election on the Basque National Party's ticket, but she failed to be elected. However, she was later elected to fill a vacancy of a fellow party member. She was elected again after the 2003 election, and she continued as a councillor from the opposition until 2007.

In 2008, she was named economic manager of Hospital Santiago in Vitoria-Gasteiz. She stepped down in 2011, and worked as organisation consultant from 2011 to 2013. From 2012 to 2013 she was a member of the Basque National Party's Executive Branch of Álava (ABB). In 2013, she became the Enonomic Manager of Osakidetza, the Basque Health Service.

She left Osakidetza in 2015, in order to serve as Deputy for Social Services in the Provincial Council of Álava. She resigned in 2016, upon being named Minister of Employment and Social Policies by lehendakari Iñigo Urkullu for his second government. After the 2020 Basque regional election, Artolazabal continued as Minister of Equality, Justice and Social Policies in the Third Urkullu Government.

In autumn 2022, media speculation grew regarding the Basque National Party's list of candidates to contest the May 2023 local and foral elections. Various outlets pointed to Artolazabal as a potential candidate to replace Gorka Urtaran for the Vitoria-Gasteiz mayoral contest. She was ultimately proposed to fill that post by the party's executive branch of Alava.

== Personal life ==
She lives in Mendibil, Arratzua-Ubarrundia. She is married and she has two children.

== Electoral history ==
Electoral history of Beatriz Artolazabal
Election	Party	Alliance	Constituency	No.	Result
1999 local	Basque National Party (EAJ-PNV)	EAJ-PNV/EA	Vitoria-Gasteiz	13	Not elected (Note: In 2000, she was elected by her party to fill the vacancy of former councillor Pedro Ignacio Elosegi.)
2003 local	Basque National Party (EAJ-PNV)	EAJ-PNV/EA	Vitoria-Gasteiz	5	Elected
2015 local	Basque National Party (EAJ-PNV)		Arratzua-Ubarrundia	7	Not elected
