= Gotzone Sagardui =

Spanish politician

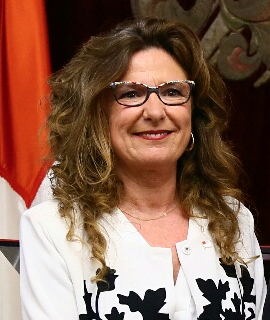
- Sagardui in April 2017

Minister of Health of the Basque Government
- In office 8 September 2020 – 25 June 2024
- President: Iñigo Urkullu
- Preceded by: Nekane Murga
- Succeeded by: Alberto Martinez

First Deputy Mayor and Councillor for Governance and Strategic Projects
- In office May 2019 – 11 September 2020
- Preceded by: (new office); Nekane Alonso (as First Deputy Mayor)
- Succeeded by: Amaia Arregi (as First Deputy Mayor); Gonzalo Olabarria (as Councillor for Governance); Asier Abaunza (as Councillor for Strategic Projects)

Councillor for the Mayor's Office, Recruitment and Human Resources
- In office 11 April 2017 – May 2019
- Preceded by: Mikel Alvarez
- Succeeded by: (office removed)

Member of the Basque Parliament for Biscay
- In office 21 October 2016 – 11 April 2017
- Succeeded by: Gorka Alvarez
- Parliamentary group: Basque Nationalists

Personal details
- Born: Miren Gotzone Sagardui Goikoetxea; 15 March 1966 (age 60) Bilbao
- Party: Basque National Party
- Children: 3
- Education: Medicine
- Alma mater: University of the Basque Country
- Occupation: Civil servant
- Website: Personal Twitter

Gotzone Sagardui (born 1966) is a Spanish politician affiliated with the Basque National Party. From September 2020 to June 2024 she served as Minister of Health in the Third Urkullu Government led by Iñigo Urkullu. She previously served as city councillor in Bilbao from 2017 to 2020, also serving as deputy mayor from 2019. She was a Member of the Basque Parliament from 2016 to 2017. She holds a degree in Medicine from the University of the Basque Country.

== Early life and education ==
Born in Bilbao on 15 March 1966, she was raised in Basauri and attended Lauro Ikastola. She studied medicine in the University of the Basque Country. She is an Expert on Workplace Risk Prevention from Francisco de Vitoria University, and she holds a Master's Degree on University Management from the University of Alcalá. She speaks Basque, Spanish, English and German, and she has some knowledge of French.

== Career ==
She earned a civil servant position in the University of the Basque Country, and she worked as an administrative officer in its Biscay Campus. She was the care manager of Leioa Care Center, a care home operated by the Social Assistance Institute of the Provincial Council of Biscay.

From 2011 to 2012 she was the head of Bilbao's Women Council for Equality. In 2013, she was named the director for labour activation of the Basque Employment Service (Lanbide), an autonomous entity of the Basque Government. She stepped down in 2016, in order to contest the 2016 Basque regional election. She was a Member of the Basque Parliament until 2017, upon being elected by her party to fill a vacancy in the City Council of Bilbao.

She held different positions on the local government from 2017 to 2020. She was the councillor for the mayor's office, recruitment and human resources from 2017 to 2019, and she also coordinated the departments of Economic Development and Good Government. She was the second member of the Basque National Party's list to contest the 2019 Bilbao City Council election, and was subsequently named First Deputy Mayor and Councillor for Governance and Strategic Projects.

After the 2020 Basque regional election Iñigo Urkullu, president of the Basque Government, appointed Sagardui as Health Minister for his third government. She took office on 8 September 2020, and resigned as city councillor three days later. As Health Minister, she was on charge of tackling the COVID-19 pandemic in the Basque Country (being the second minister to do so, as Nekane Murga held the office during the pandemic's first wave) and managing the vaccination programme of the region.

== Personal life ==
She currently lives in Bilbao. She is married and she has two sons and a daughter. She is a supporter of Athletic Bilbao. She used to practice Basque dance as a member of Edurre Dantza Taldea.

== Electoral history ==
Electoral history of Gotzone Sagardui
Election	Party	Constituency	No.	Result
2015 local	Basque National Party (EAJ-PNV)	Bilbao	16	Not elected (Note: In 2017, she was elected by her party to fill the vacancy of former councillor Mikel Alvarez.)
2016 regional	Basque National Party (EAJ-PNV)	Biscay	9	Elected (Note: She resigned in 2017, in order to serve as city councillor.)
2019 local	Basque National Party (EAJ-PNV)	Bilbao	2	Elected (Note: She resigned in 2020, in order to serve as Health Minister.)
