= Jokin Bildarratz =

Spanish politician

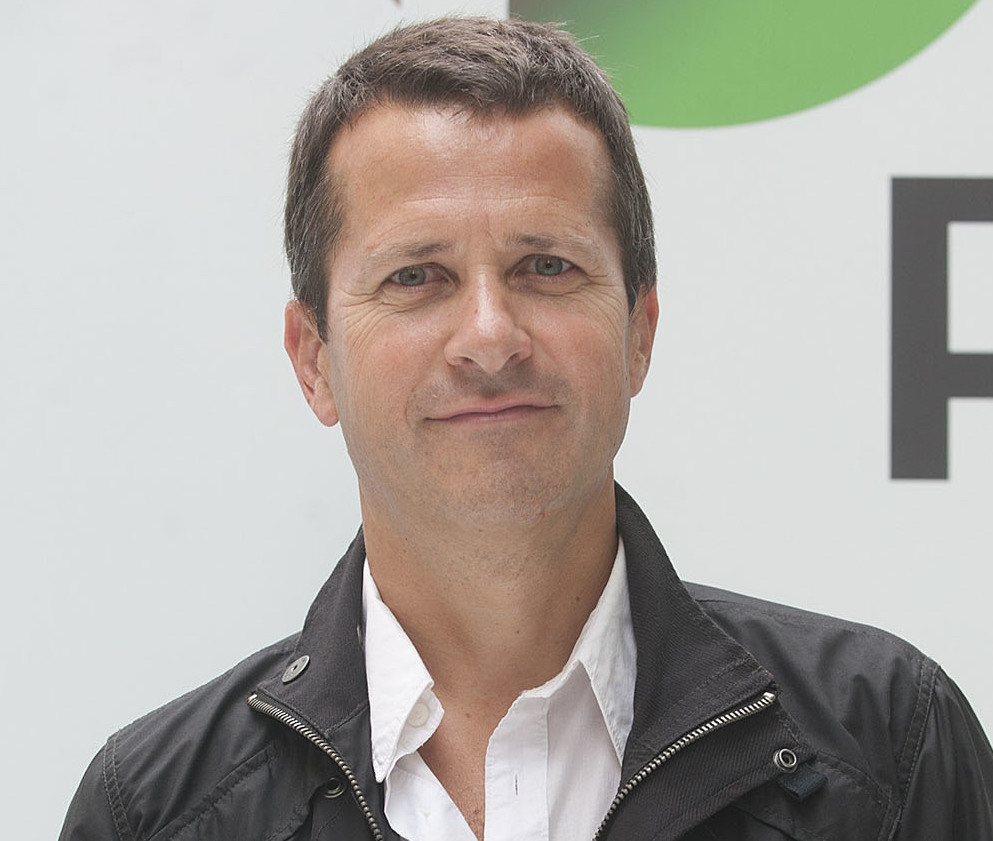
Jokin Bildarratz in 2012.

Jokin Bildarratz Sorron (born 1963) is a Spanish politician affiliated with the Basque Nationalist Party. As of 8 September 2020, he serves as Minister of Education in the Third Urkullu Government led by Iñigo Urkullu.
