= Iñaki Arriola =

Spanish politician

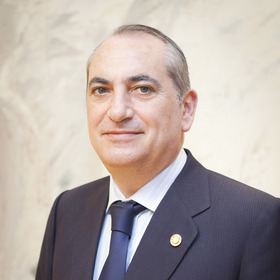
- Iñaki Arriola in 2011

Iñaki Arriola López is a Spanish politician affiliated with the Socialist Party of the Basque Country–Basque Country Left. As of 8 September 2020, he serves in the Basque Government as Regional Minister of Territorial Planning, Housing and Transport in the Third Urkullu Government led by Iñigo Urkullu. From 28 November 2016 to 8 September 2020, he served as Regional Minister for Environment, Territorial Planning and Housing in the Second Urkullu Government. From 2009 to 2012, he served as Regional Minister of Public Works, Transport and Housing in the López Government led by Patxi López. From 1993 to 2009, he served as Mayor of Eibar.
