= Bingen Zupiria =

Spanish politician

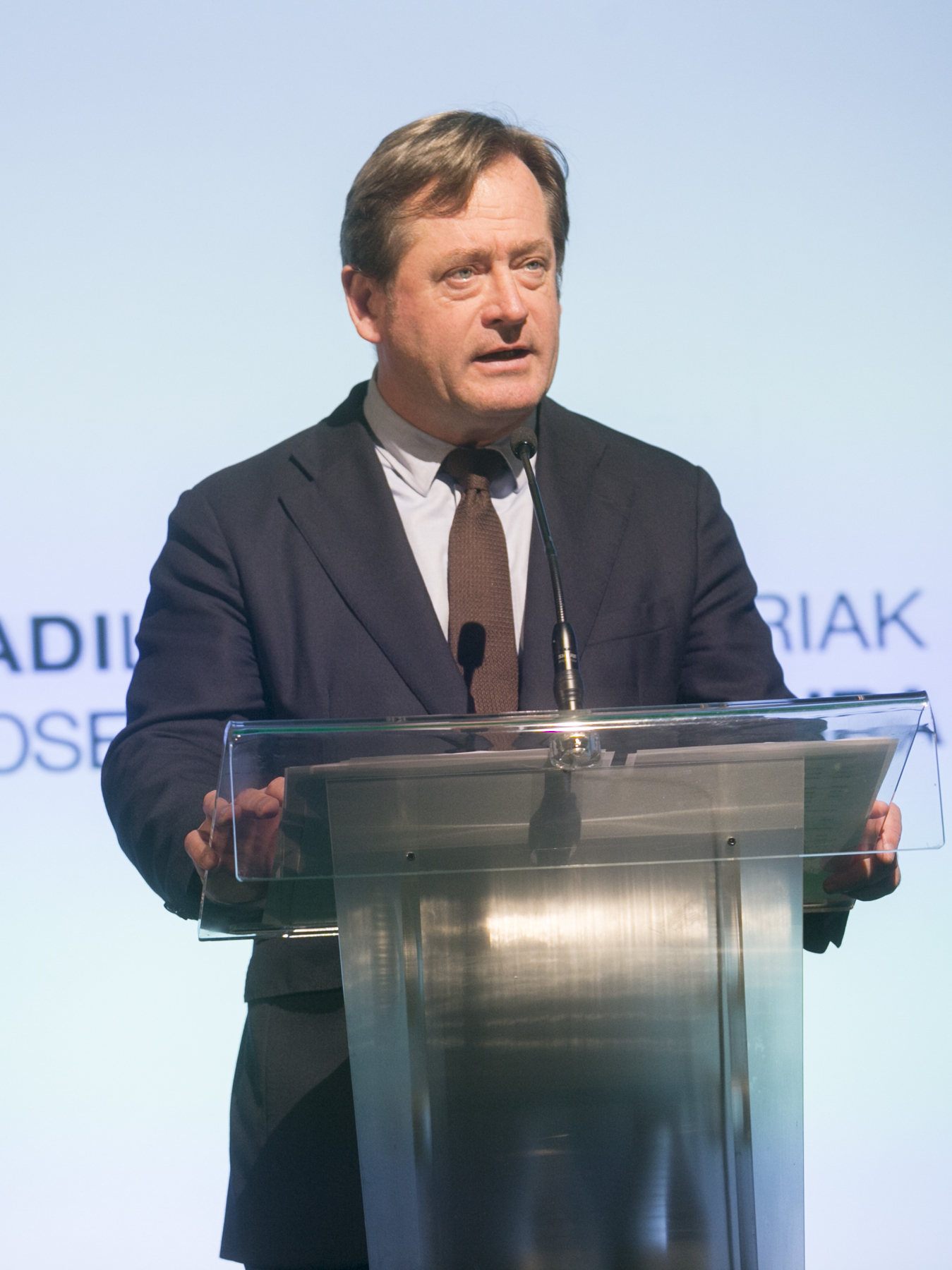
- Zupiria in 2017

Minister of Security
- Incumbent
- Assumed office 25 June 2024
- President: Imanol Pradales
- Preceded by: Josu Erkoreka

Government Spokesperson
- In office 8 September 2020 – 25 June 2024
- President: Iñigo Urkullu
- Preceded by: Josu Erkoreka
- Succeeded by: Maria Ubarretxena

Minister of Culture and Language Policy
- In office 28 November 2016 – 25 June 2024
- President: Iñigo Urkullu
- Preceded by: Cristina Uriarte (as Minister of Education, Language Policy and Culture)
- Succeeded by: Ibone Bengoetxea

Acting Director-General of EITB
- In office 2008–2009
- Preceded by: Andoni Ortuzar
- Succeeded by: Alberto Surio

Director of ETB
- In office 1999–2009
- Preceded by: Vacant (Iñaki Zarraoa as acting director, previously Luis Aranberri)
- Succeeded by: Miguel Angel Idigoras

Press Secretary of the Basque Government and Communications Advisor to the Lehendakari
- In office 2 September 1989 – 22 January 1999
- President: Jose Antonio Ardanza
- Preceded by: Juan Ignacio Intxaurraga Beaskoetxea
- Succeeded by: Joseba García Bengoetxea

Personal details
- Born: Bingen Zupiria Gorostidi; 1961 (age 64–65) Hernani
- Party: Basque National Party
- Spouse: Aintzane Bolinaga
- Children: 3
- Education: Philosophy and Letters University of Deusto
- Occupation: Journalist
- Website: Personal Twitter

Bingen Zupiria (born 1961) is a Spanish politician affiliated with the Basque National Party. As of 25 June 2024, he serves as Minister of Security in the Basque Government led by Imanol Pradales. He previously served as Minister of Culture and Language Policy in the Second Urkullu Government (2016–2020) and the Third Urkullu Government (2020–2024), serving under Iñigo Urkullu. He also served as government spokesperson from 2020 to 2024.

== Early life and education ==
He was born in Hernani in 1961, and attended Urumea Ikastola. He holds a degree in Philosophy and Letters from the University of Deusto, specialising in Basque Philology. He graduated with honours in 1984. In 2002, he earned an MBA on Management of Worker Cooperatives by Mondragon University.

He was a member of the music duo "Miren eta Bingen", along with Miren Etxaniz. The duo played traditional Basque music, and Zupiria used to play the pandero. The duo was active for four years, and they released an album in 1982.

== Career ==
In 1983, he started a journalist career at EITB, the public broadcasting service of the Basque Country. He worked as editor and presenter in the news division of ETB, the public television. He used to present Gaur Egun and Teleberri, the news programmes of ETB1 and ETB2, respectively. He later worked as editor in chief of ETB's news division.

From 1989 to 1999 he was the Press Secretary of the Basque Government and Communications Advisor to the Lehendakari (President of the Basque Government), working under the presidency of Jose Antonio Ardanza. In 1999 he returned to EITB as director of ETB, where he remained until 2009, upon being sacked by the new administration formed after the 2009 Basque regional election. He briefly served as acting Director-General of EITB from 2008 to 2009, succeeding Andoni Ortuzar.

From 2005 to 2007 he was the director of a joint master's degree by EITB and the University of Deusto on Audiovisual, Corporate and Institutional Communication. He was a visiting professor at the University of Mondragon for two years, from 2007 to 2009, teaching the course Quality to last year students of Audiovisual Communication degree. He has also taught in master's degrees on Corporate Communication and Management of Innovation and Knowledge by the University of the Basque Country.

During the summer of 2009 he worked as script supervisor for the Basque drama series Mugaldekoak. After leaving his post at EITB he was the director of G-Quest from November 2009, a Bilbao-based company working on social research, strategic marketing and communication. He was also a contributor for the newspaper Deia and the radio station Cadena Ser.

In 2012, he became the director of the newspaper Deia. In 2016 Lehendakari Iñigo Urkullu named Zupiria Minister of Culture and Language Policy of the Basque Government. After the 2020 Basque regional election Urkullu formed his third government, where Zupiria remained as Minister of Culture and Language Policy and assumed the office of government spokesperson.

The 2024 Basque regional election was followed by Imanol Pradales' election as lehendakari. Zupiria was one of the few ministers from Urkullu's last government to continue in the new cabinet. He was named Minister of Security, succeeding Josu Erkoreka.

== Personal life ==
He currently lives in Bilbao. He is married to Aintzane Bolinaga, a news editor at EITB. The couple has two sons and a daughter.
