= Mikel Torres =

Spanish politician (born 1970)

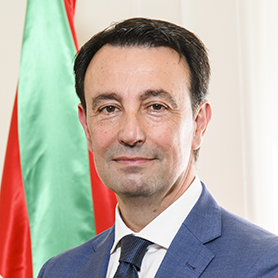
- Torres in 2024

Second Vice Lehendakari of the Basque Country
- Incumbent
- Assumed office 24 June 2024
- President: Imanol Pradales
- Preceded by: Idoia Mendia

Personal details
- Born: 20 July 1970 (age 55)
- Party: Socialist Party of the Basque Country–Basque Country Left

Mikel Torres Lorenzo (born 20 July 1970) is a Spanish politician. He has served as second vice lehendakari and as minister of economy, labour and employment of the Basque Country since 2024. From 2008 to 2024, he served as mayor of Portugalete.
