= Denis Itxaso =

Spanish politician (born 1975)

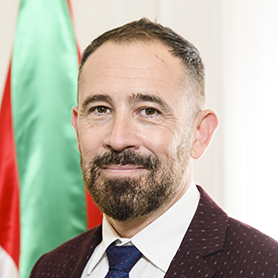
- Itxaso in 2024

Minister of Housing and Urban Agenda of the Basque Country
- Incumbent
- Assumed office 24 June 2024
- President: Imanol Pradales
- Preceded by: Iñaki Arriola

Personal details
- Born: 29 May 1975 (age 50)
- Party: Socialist Party of the Basque Country–Basque Country Left

Denis Itxaso González (born 29 May 1975) is a Spanish politician serving as minister of housing and urban agenda of the Basque Country since 2024. From 2020 to 2024, he served as government delegate to the Basque Country.
