= Department of Justice and Public Administration =

The Department of Justice and Public Administration (Basque: Eusko Jaurlaritzako Justizia eta Herri Administrazio Saila; Spanish: Departamento de Justicia y Administración Pública) is the department of the Basque Government responsible for the community's public administration and justice system. It was created in 1936 and restored in 1980 under democracy.

== Ministers ==
- 1936-1960: Jesus Maria Leizaola
- 1978-1980: Jose Antonio Agiriano
- 1980-1982: Carmelo Renobale
- 1984-1985: Juan Porres
- 1985-1991: Juan Ramon Gebera
- 1991: Javier Caño
- 1991-1995: Jose Ramon Rekalde
- 1995-1997: Ramon Jauregi
- 1997-1998: Francisco Egea
- 1998-2001: Sabin Intxaurraga
- 2001-2009: Joseba Azkarraga
- 2009-2012: Idoia Mendia
- 2012-present: Josu Erkoreka
