= Ertzaintza =

Police of the Basque Country, Spain

People's Guard Ertzaintza
- Badge of the Ertzaintza

Agency overview
- Formed: 1982
- Preceding agency: Ertzaña
- Annual budget: €570 million (2015)

Jurisdictional structure
- Operations jurisdiction: Basque Country, Spain
- Governing body: Home Office of the Basque Government
- Constituting instrument: Statute of Autonomy of the Basque Country
- General nature: Local civilian police

Operational structure
- Headquarters: Erandio (Biscay), Basque Country, Spain
- Ertzainas: 6.800
- Elected officer responsible: Bingen Zupiria, Basque Minister of Security
- Agency executive: Gervasio Gabirondo, Director
- Divisions: List: Citizen Security; Criminal Investigations; Intelligence
- Police Stations: List: Vitoria-Gasteiz; Llodio/Laudio; Laguardia/Guardia; Durango; Balmaseda; Sestao; Bilbao/Bilbo; Beasain; Zumarraga; Tolosa; Azkoitia; Zarautz; Hernani; Donostia/San Sebastián; Errenteria; Irun; Eibar; Bergara; Ondarroa; Gernika; Muskiz

Facilities
- Stations: 20
- Boats: 9
- Helicopters: 2

Notables
- Anniversaries: Ertzaintza Day (May 16); Honouring Ertzaintza Victims of Terrorism (June 14)

Website
- http://www.ertzaintza.eus

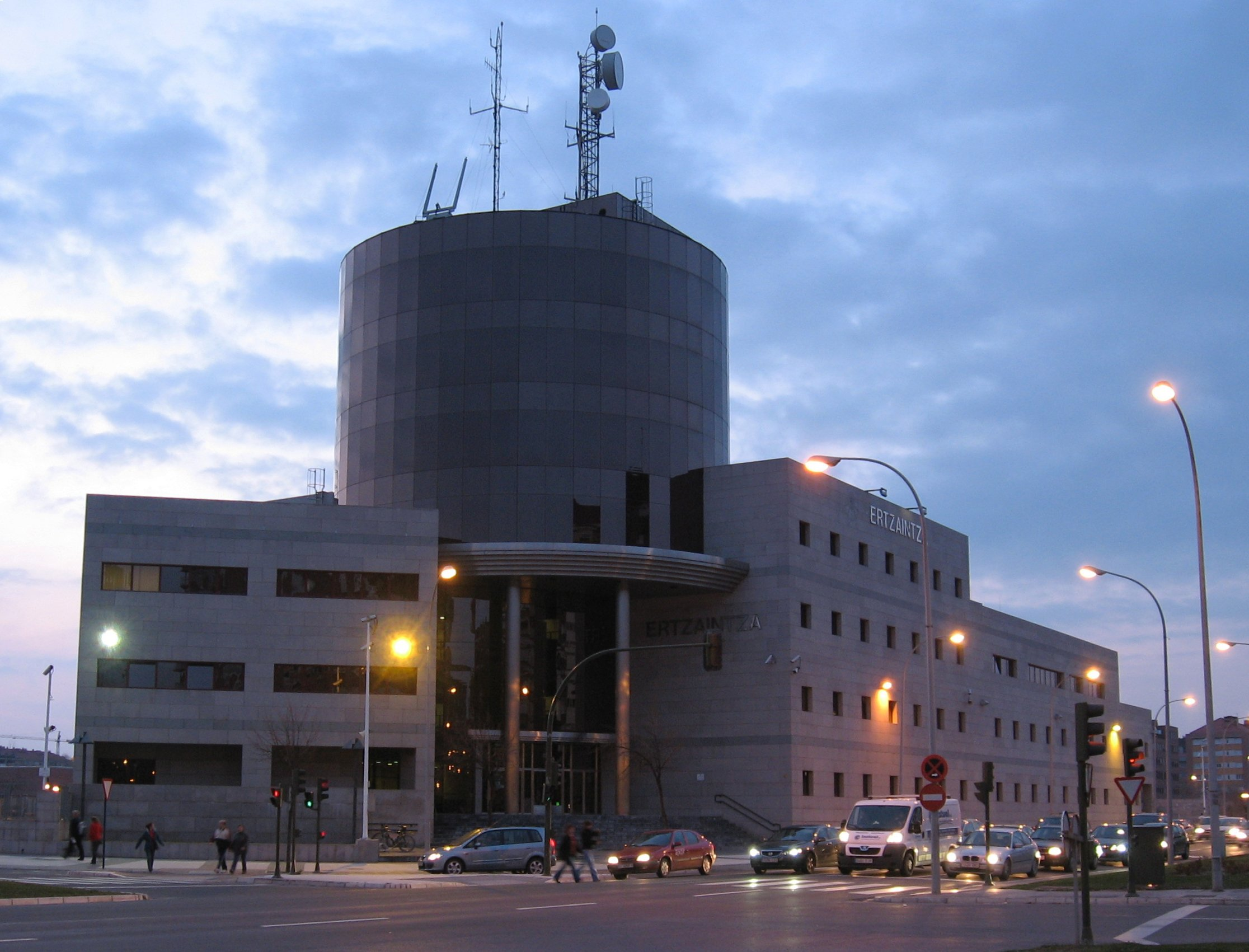
Ertzaintza Headquarters in Vitoria-Gasteiz

The Ertzaintza (Basque: [erts̻aints̻a], lit. 'Public Guard' or 'People's Guard') is the comprehensive police force of the Basque Autonomous Community, holding full jurisdiction over public safety, criminal investigations, and counter-terrorism within the autonomous community.

However, specific core state powers, such as issuing national ID cards (DNI) and passports, border control, and immigration, remain the exclusive responsibility of the Spanish National Police and Civil Guard. An Ertzaintza officer is called an ertzaina (IPA: [erts̻aɲa]).

== History ==
It was a response to the banditry caused by the continuous social and political upheaval occurring from the end of the 18th century and well into the 19th. The decisive argument for its configuration was the First Carlist War, when the Miqueletes of Biscay and Guipuzcoa and the Miñones of Alava commenced their activities.

Once the urgencies of the war were overcome, the Spanish government attempted to recover the functions carried out by these regional forces and transfer them to the Civil Guard, which was created in 1844. Nevertheless, due to difficulties encountered when recruiting forces for this corps in the Basque provinces, plus the pressure posed by the other regional Governments, the very same regional forces were able to more or less carry on with their task.

=== After the Carlist Wars ===
After the end of the Second Carlist War (1876), the Spanish government wished to curtail the regional autonomy. The Basque police forces had to adapt to this new centralist tendency, and these changes mostly manifested themselves in a reduction of personnel & operational capabilities.

When the Second Spanish Republic was proclaimed in 1931, political activity surged and so did the Basque claim to re-establish regional liberties that had been abolished in 1876. Thus, various projects for the Autonomy Statute were promoted.

On October 1, 1936, during the Spanish Civil War, the Basque Statute of Autonomy come into force, leading to the establishment of an autonomous government with actual authority over the provinces of Biscay and Guipuzcoa. One of the priorities of the new government was the re-establishment of public order.

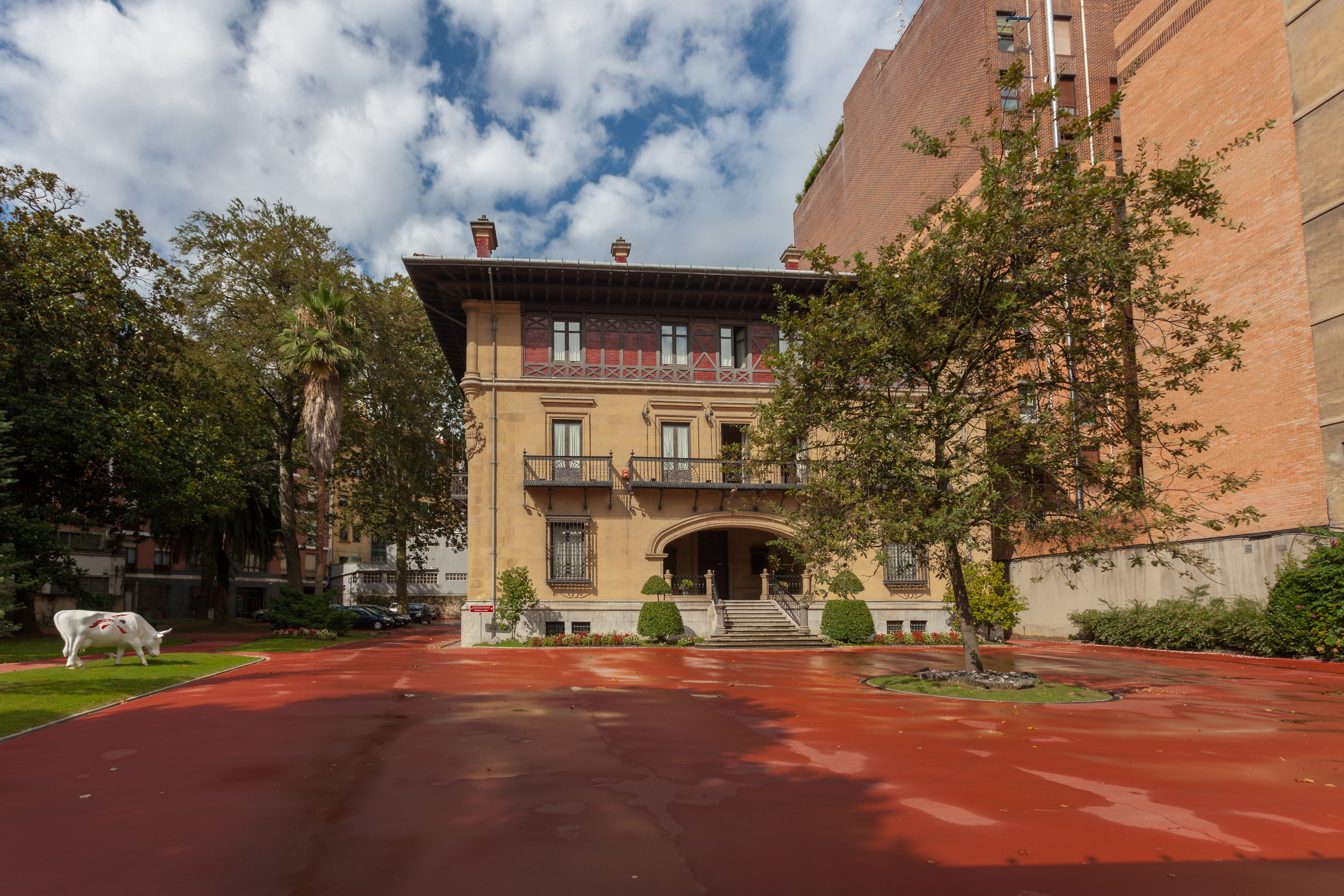
Ibaigane Palace in 2018.

The Basque Interior Minister Telesforo Monzón set up several institutions, such as the International Police Force, the Maritime Police and the Public Order Body. Their main task was the creation of a police force named Ertzaña (a Basque neologism for "People care"), with 500 infantry and 400 motorised (Ertzañ Igiletua) men, totalling joint forces of around 1,200 agents. Most of the British Riley Motor cars acquired for the motorised police did not arrive due to the Non-Intervention Pact. The majority of the Ertzaña were Basque speakers from the Basque Nationalist Party. Its headquarters were in Bilbao, at the Ibaigane Palace (currently the headquarters of Athletic Bilbao).

When the war on the Basque front concluded, the Ertzaña was dissolved, and Franco's Nationalist regime pretended that this institution had never existed in the first place.

Having allied themselves with the losing Republican side, Biscay and Guipuzcoa were considered "traitor provinces" and most of their autonomy was annulled. However, since at the outbreak of the civil war Alava and Navarre had thrown their lot in with the Nationalists, the Miñones and Miqueletes continued on duty, with assignments such as traffic patrols and custody of the regional institutions.

=== During transition ===
After the Spanish transition to democracy, the autonomous Basque Government was restored. Its government once again took up the spirit of the Ertzaña of 1936 to design, in 1980, the new autonomous police force of the Basque Country, the Ertzaintza (a more grammatical form). Previously, a Royal Decree re-established the "Forales" and the "Miqueletes" in Biscay and Guipuzcoa and gave a new configuration to the "Miñones" corps in Alava. These institutions were incorporated into the new Basque Police Force.

Navarre, during the events surrounding Spain's 1978 Constitution, ended up with the status of Autonomous Community and was not lumped in with the Basque autonomous community, and its police force (Policía Foral) remains independent of the Ertzaintza.

=== Officers ===
The first officers were members of the Basque Nationalist Party. Although the law required that Ertzaintza commissioned officers had to be previous members of the Spanish army or the State police forces, this was often ignored.

This new police force, made up of Basque citizens, developed in an organized manner from 1982, and was progressively deployed starting from the countryside towards the cities.

=== Equipment ===
Like many other Spanish Military and Police agencies Ertzaintza issues the H&K USP Compact chambered in 9mm.

Ertzaintza car license plate.

Ertzaintza vehicles display Spanish license plates with a stylized E and a number. They are also registered in the general number scheme but the code is not displayed.

== Beltzak ==
The Mobile Brigade of the Ertzaintza (Brigada Móvil de la Ertzaintza) is the riot unit of the Ertzaintza.

The police officers of the Mobile Brigade are called beltzak (blacks in Basque language) because of their black fire-proof uniforms.

== Rank insignia ==
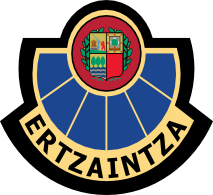
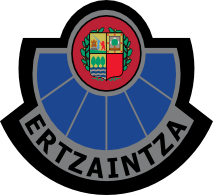
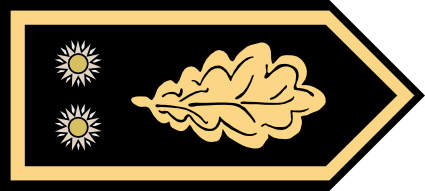
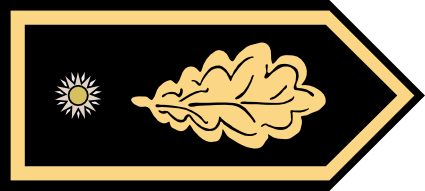
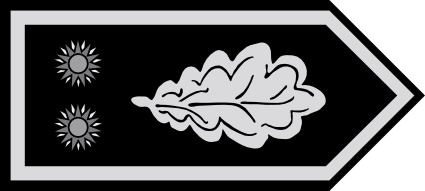
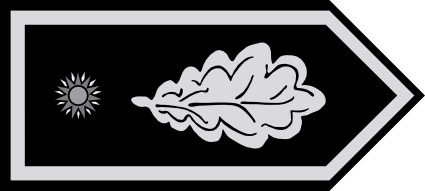
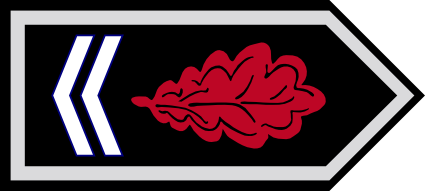
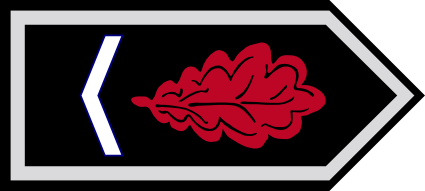
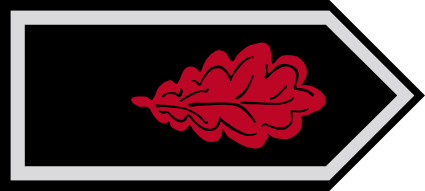
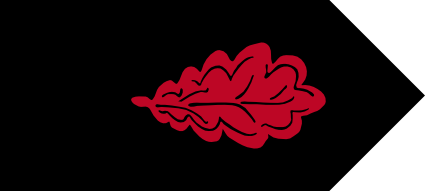
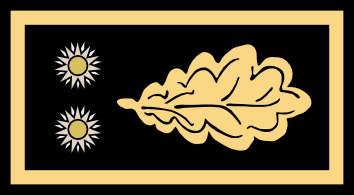
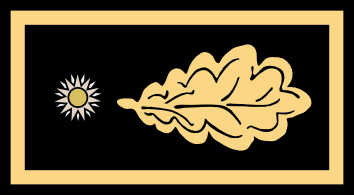
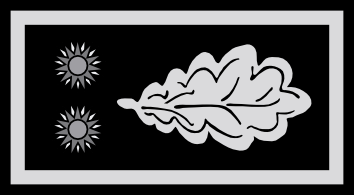
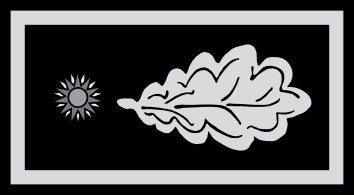
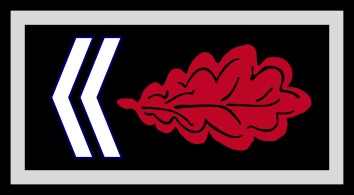
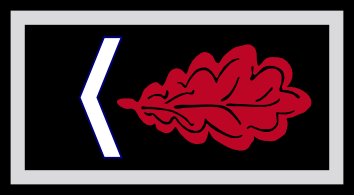
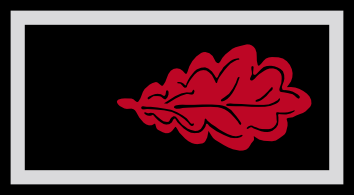
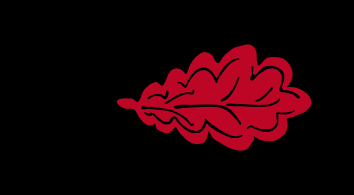
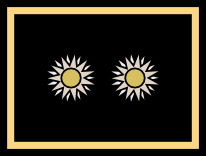
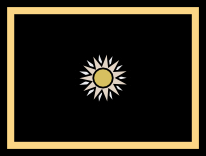
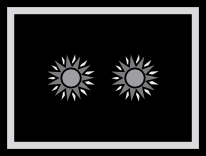
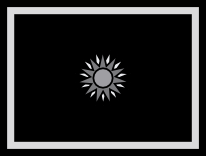
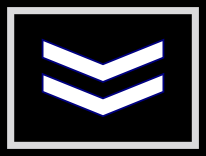
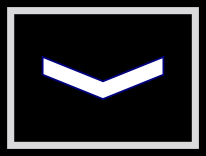
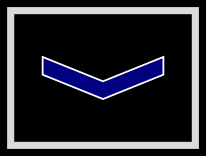
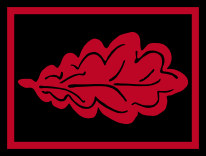
Police Ranks		Superior Grade		Executive Grade		Inspection Grade		Basic Grade
	Cap Emblem	Escala Superior		Escala Básica, Inspección y Ejecutiva
	Rigid Shoulder Plate	Intendenteburua / Superintendente	Intendentea / Intendente	Komisarioa / Comisario	Komisariondokoa / Subcomisario	Ofiziala / Oficial	Ofizialaondokoa / Suboficial	Lehenengoa agentea / Agente 1º	Agentea / Agente
	Flexible Shoulder Plate	Intendenteburua / Superintendente	Intendentea / Intendente	Komisarioa / Comisario	Komisariondokoa / Subcomisario	Ofiziala / Oficial	Ofizialaondokoa / Suboficial	Lehenengoa agentea / Agente 1º	Agentea / Agente
	Rank Insignia	Intendenteburua / Superintendente	Intendentea / Intendente	Komisarioa / Comisario	Komisariondokoa / Subcomisario	Ofiziala / Oficial	Ofizialaondokoa / Suboficial	Lehenengoa agentea / Agente 1º	Agentea / Agente
	Basque	Intendenteburua	Intendentea	Komisarioa	Komisariondokoa	Ofiziala	Ofizialondokoa	Agente lehena	Agentea
	Spanish	Superintendente	Intendente	Comisario	Subcomisario	Oficial	Suboficial	Agente primero	Agente
	English	Superintendent	Intendent	Commissioner	Deputy Commissioner	Officer	Deputy Officer	Superior Agent	Agent

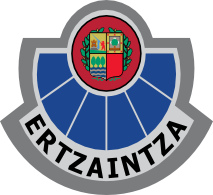
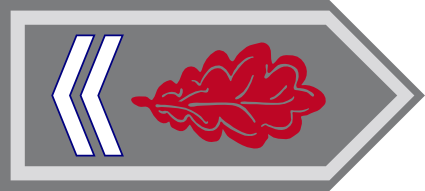
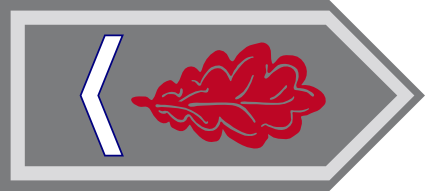
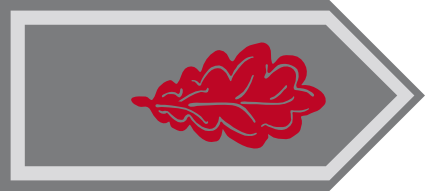
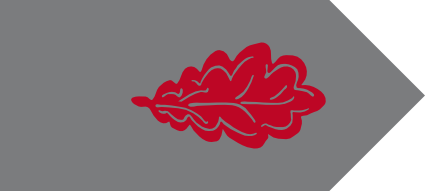
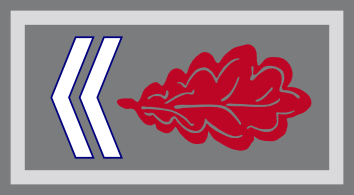
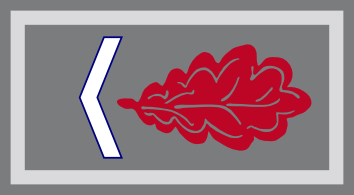
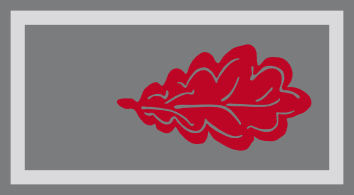
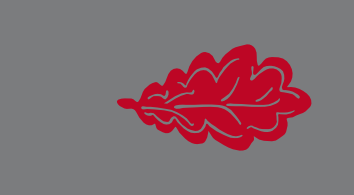
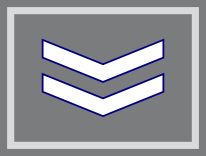
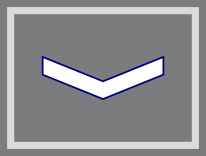
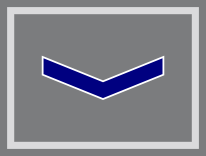
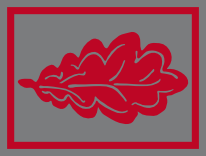
Police Ranks		Facultatives and Technicians Grade
	Cap Emblem	Escala Superior
	Rigid Shoulder Plate	Grupo A1	Grupo A2	Grupo C1	Grupo C2
	Flexible Shoulder Plate	Grupo A1	Grupo A2	Grupo C1	Grupo C2
	Rank Insignia	Grupo A1	Grupo A2	Grupo C1	Grupo C2
	Group	Group A1	Group A2	Group C1	Group C2

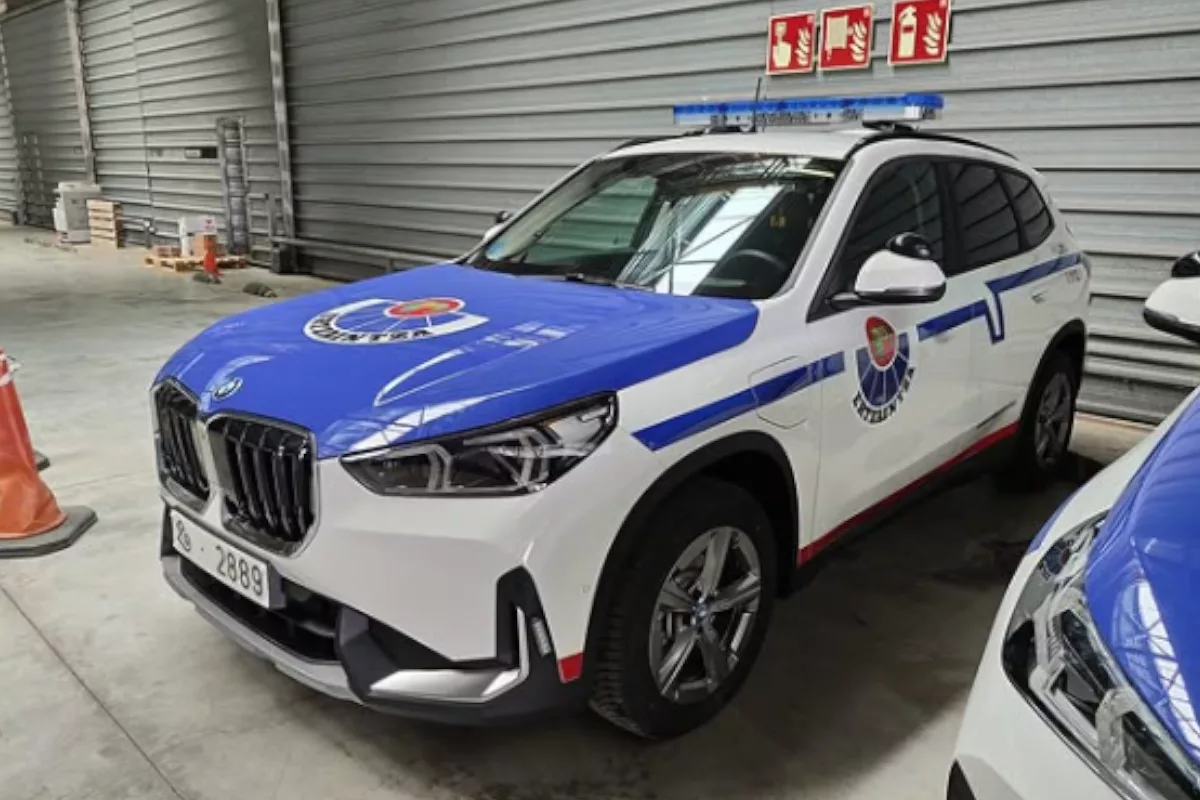
Ertzaintza's BMW X1

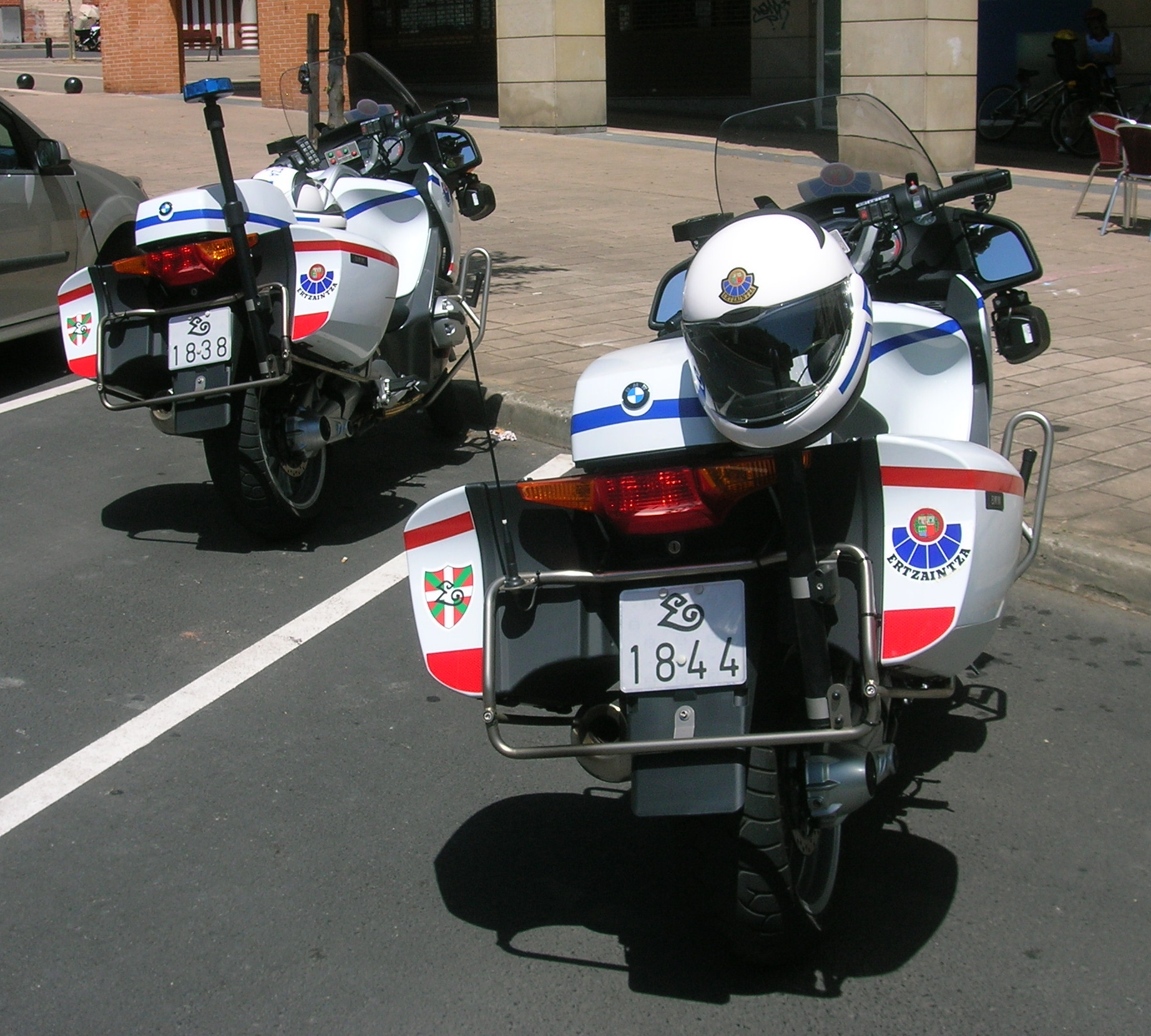
Ertzaintza BMW motorbikes

== Problems with ETA and controversies ==
Ertzaintza is not accepted by the Basque nationalist parties ETA and Batasuna, who deride it as zipaioak, or sepoys, an indigenous force serving the colonial power. As Ertzaintza took a more relevant role in the fight against ETA, it has become a target for them. It was soon infiltrated by ETA members, like Iñaki de Juana Chaos. In the areas where support for ETA is higher, ertzainas are forced to reside elsewhere and commute to work. Fourteen ertzainas have been killed or injured by ETA, sometimes being specifically targeted.

The Spanish government has had reservations about Ertzaintza. Spanish parties have often accused the Basque Home Office (in most terms held by the Basque Nationalist Party) of being soft on the fight against ETA and its supporting party Batasuna. Two police officers of Ertzaintza said that the former nationalist government "gave them orders not to act against ETA members and its social environment". Because of infiltration, Ertzaintza is not allowed by the Spanish Ministry of the Interior to access the Interpol intelligence network. On 1 March 2010, Ertzaintza joined the Center for Police and Customs Cooperation in Hendaye, France, near the Spanish border. It is a joint police station for information exchange with the French police. The Spanish Civil Guard, the Spanish National Police Corps and the Customs Watch Services of the Spanish Tax Agency are also part of the center.

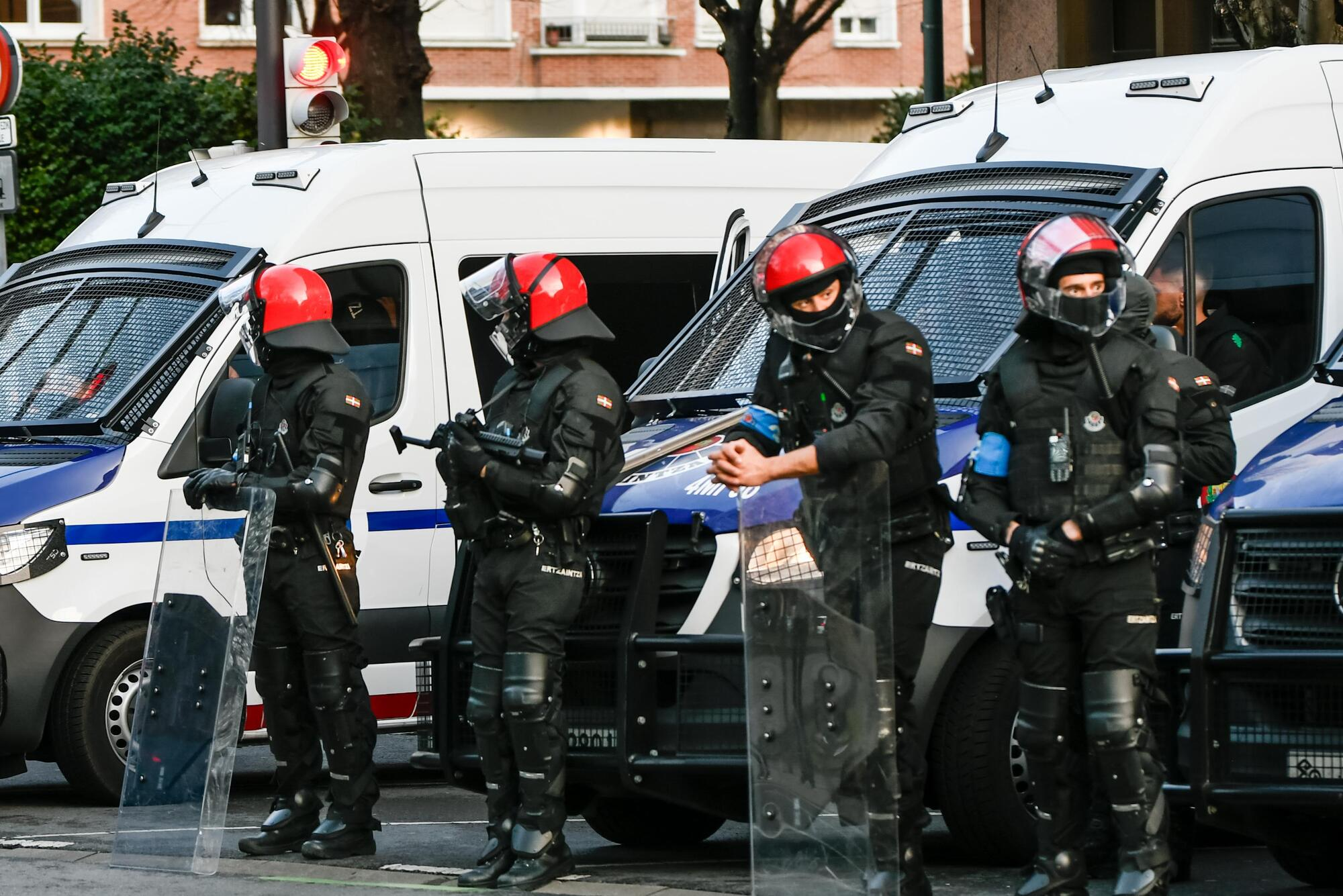
Ertzaintza 'Beltzak' Mobile Brigade

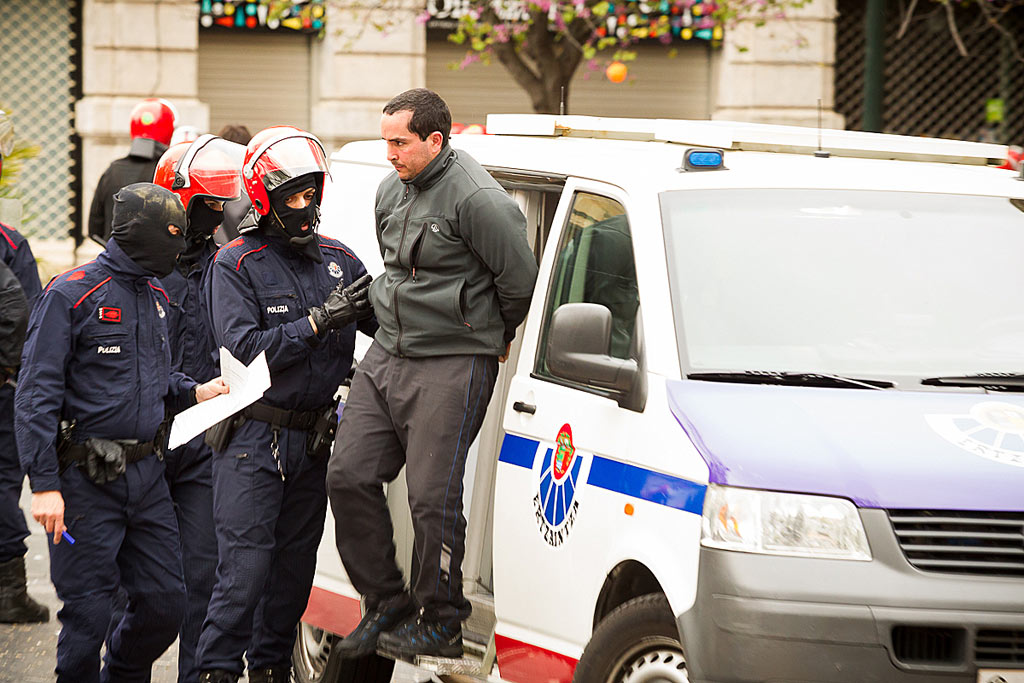
Ertzainas making an arrest

Lack of communication has occasionally led to shootings among police forces.

Some councillors of the Basque Country said that they have perceived a "decrease of the pro-ETA menace because of the current important role of the Ertzaintza against terrorism".

== Etymology ==
Ertzaña was a Basque neologism from eŕi ("people") and zañ ("guard") created by the Nationalist poet Esteban Urkiaga Lauaxeta. The generic Basque word for "police" is polizia. Following the standardization of Basque in the 1960s, the name of the restored force became "Ertzaintza" from the respelled herri and zain (compare with artzain, "shepherd" from ardi + zain), with the suffix -tza (compare Osakidetza, the Basque health service). However to maintain a link to the past, the silent H was not included. The Basque pop group Hertzainak ("The policemen") chose their name prior to the re-establishment of the corps and applied the modern spelling rules.
