= Juan José Ibarretxe =

Spanish politician

Juan Jose Ibarretxe
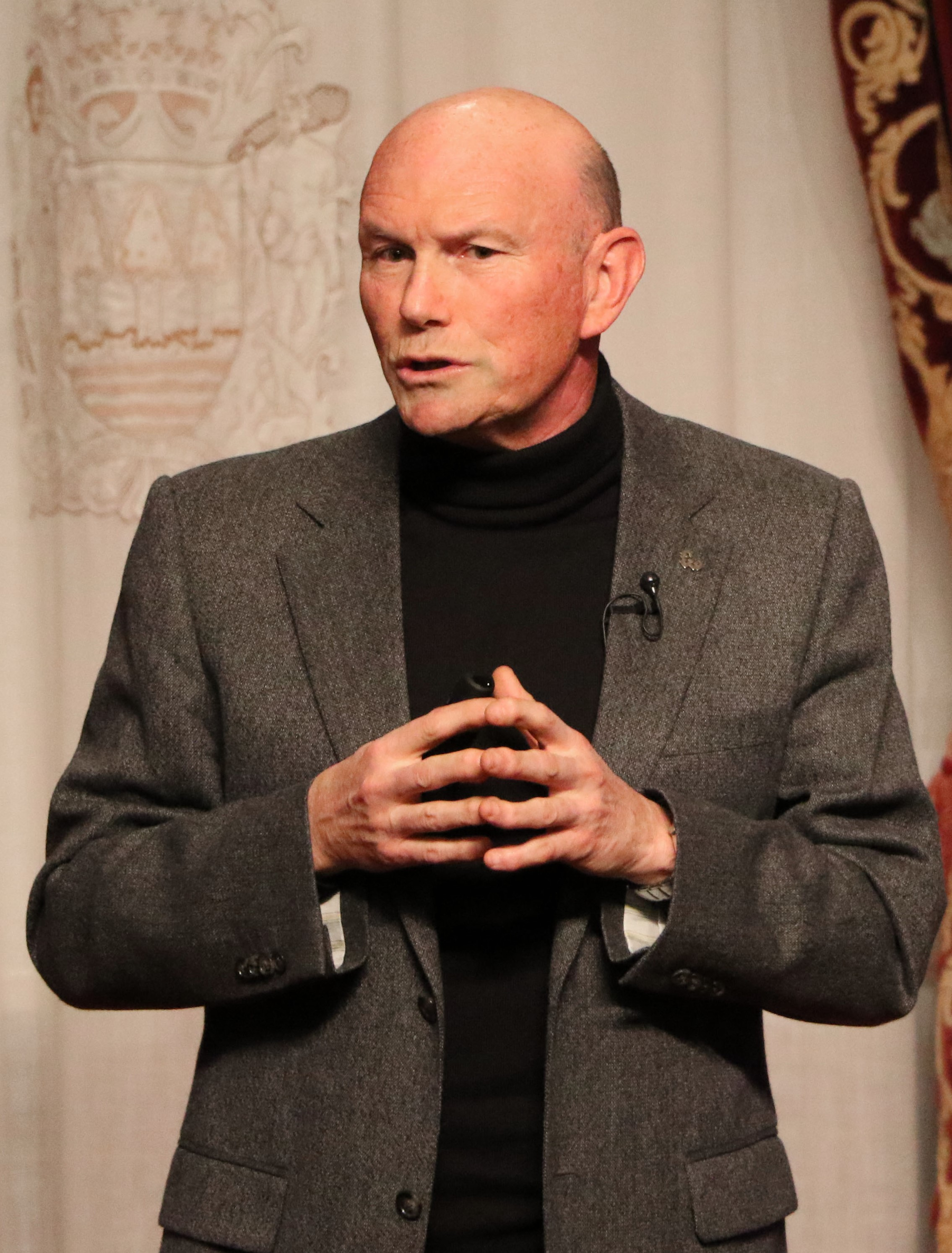

Lehendakari of the Basque Country
- In office 2 January 1999 – 7 May 2009
- Vice President: Idoia Zenerrutzabeitia Beldarrain
- Preceded by: José Antonio Ardanza
- Succeeded by: Patxi López

Deputy Lehendakari of the Basque Country
- In office 4 January 1995 – 2 January 1999
- President: José Antonio Ardanza
- Preceded by: Jon Imanol Azúa
- Succeeded by: Idoia Zenerrutzabeitia Beldarrain

Personal details
- Born: Juan José Ibarretxe Markuartu; 15 May 1957 (age 68) Llodio, Álava, Spain
- Party: PNV
- Spouse: Begoña Arregui

Juan José Ibarretxe Markuartu (born 15 March 1957) is a former president of the Basque Autonomous Community in Spain. Also a leading member of the Basque Nationalist Party (PNV) during the period, he held office from 2 January 1999 to 7 May 2009. Ibarretxe is an advocate of Basque independence by peaceful means.

== Origins and early political career ==
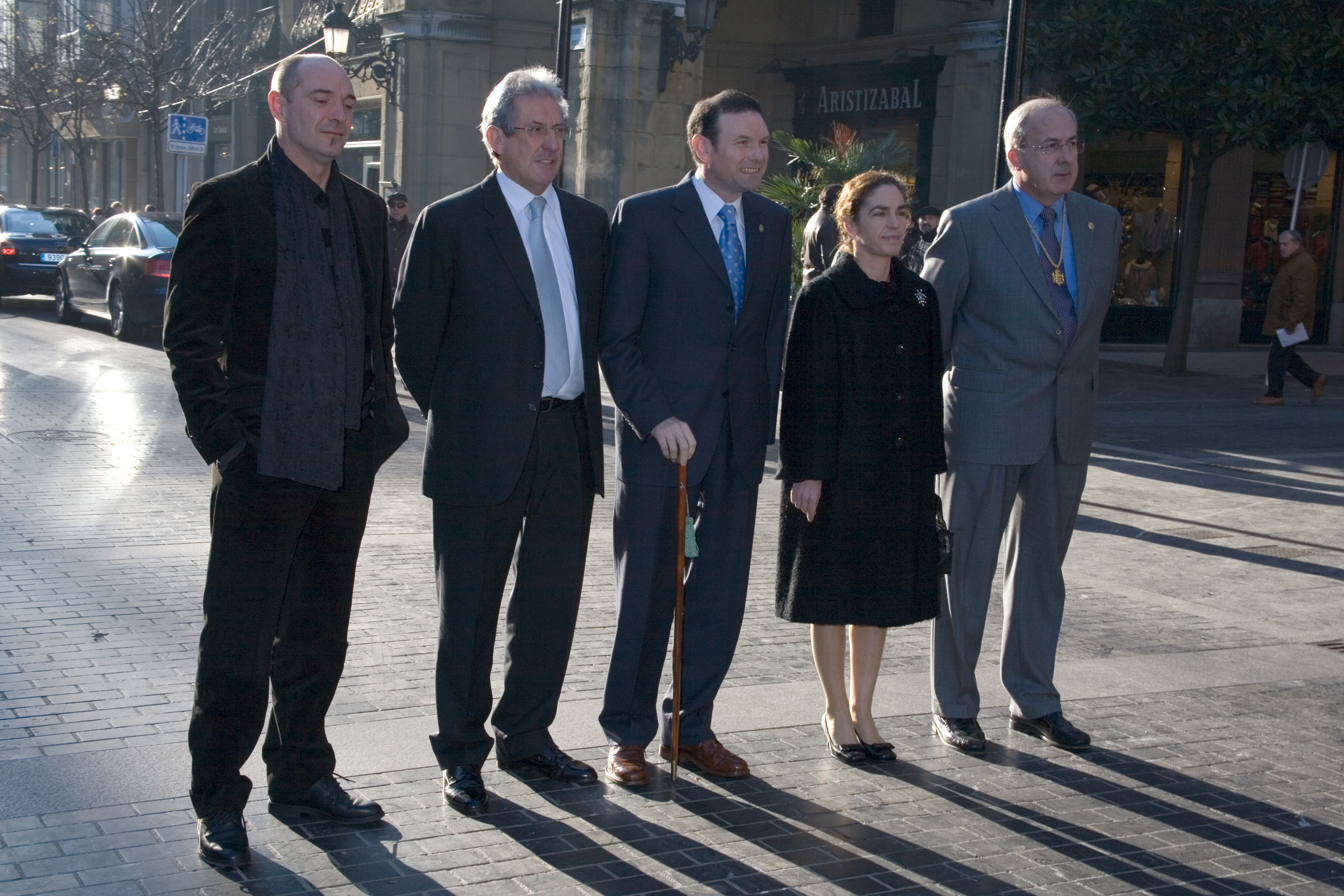
Ibarretxe (middle) at an event in San Sebastián

He was born in Llodio in the province of Álava, and holds a degree in Economics from the University of the Basque Country. In 1983 he was elected a member of the Basque Parliament for Álava, representing the PNV, and from then on rose steadily to prominence. From 1986 to 1990 and 1991-1994 he was the President of the PNV Economic and Budgetary Commission. On 4 January 1995, then Basque President José Antonio Ardanza appointed him Vice President.

== Lehendakari ==
On 28 March 1998, he was nominated PNV presidential candidate to compete in the October 25 Basque election, and became lehendakari (president) on 2 January 1999. In October 2003 he released the highly controversial Ibarretxe Plan (Plan Ibarretxe), which foresaw a future Basque country freely associated with Spain, with its own separate legal system and European Union (EU) representation. In October 2007 while in office he was prosecuted for holding talks with other political agents in search for a compromise leading to peace, considered illegal by the judge for the participation of former members of Batasuna.

== Private life and hobbies ==
Ibarretxe grew up speaking only Spanish, but now speaks Basque acceptably and English. He is an avid cycling fan and has presided over a cycling club in Llodio. He is married and has two children. He is a non-practising Roman Catholic.

== See also ==
- Basque nationalism
- Politics of Spain

| Preceded by José Antonio Ardanza | Lehendakari (Basque President); 1999-2009 | Succeeded by Patxi López |
| Preceded by Jon Imanol Azúa | Deputy Lehendakari (Deputy Basque President); 1995-1999 | Succeeded by Idoia Zenerrutzabeitia Beldarrain |
