= Second government of Iñigo Urkullu =

Second Urkullu Government
- Government of Basque Country

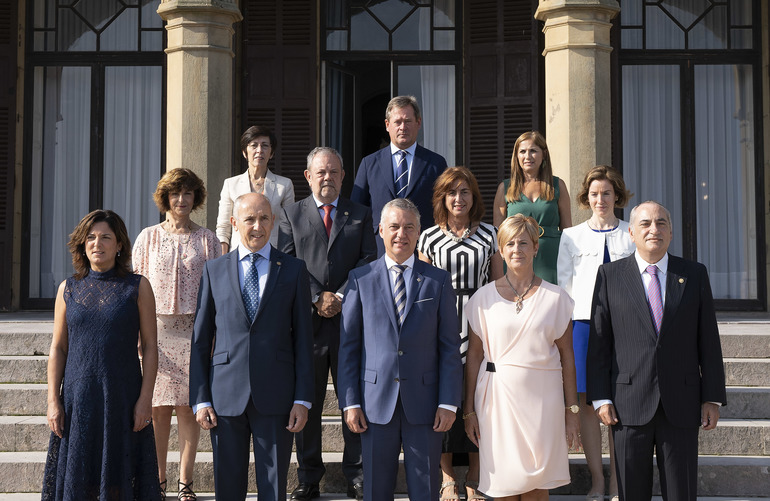
- Date formed: 25 November 2016

People and organisations
- Head of government: Iñigo Urkullu
- No. of ministers: 12
- Member party: Basque Nationalist Party; Socialist Party
- Status in legislature: Minority coalition
- Opposition party: EH Bildu
- Opposition leader: Maddalen Iriarte

History
- Election: 2016 regional election
- Legislature term: 11th Parliament (2016–2020)
- Predecessor: Urkullu I
- Successor: Urkullu III

The Second Urkullu Government was the regional government of the Basque Country led by President (Lehendakari) Iñigo Urkullu between 2016 and 2020. It was formed in November 2016 after the regional election.

== Government ==
Name	Portrait	Party	Office	Took office	Left office	^{Refs.}
Iñigo Urkullu		Basque Nationalist Party	President	25 November 2016	5 September 2020	
Iñaki Arriola		Socialist Party of the Basque Country–Basque Country Left	Minister for Environment, Territorial Planning and Housing	28 November 2016	8 September 2020	
Beatriz Artolazabal		Basque Nationalist Party	Minister for Employment and Social Policies	28 November 2016	8 September 2020	
Pedro Azpiazu		Basque Nationalist Party	Minister of Finance and Economy	28 November 2016	8 September 2020	
Estefanía Beltrán de Heredia		Basque Nationalist Party	Minister of Security	28 November 2016	8 September 2020	
Jon Darpón		Basque Nationalist Party	Minister of Health	28 November 2016	14 March 2019	
Nekane Murga		Basque Nationalist Party	Minister of Health	14 March 2019	8 September 2020	
Josu Erkoreka		Basque Nationalist Party	Minister of Public Governance and Self-Government	28 November 2016	8 September 2020	
Josu Erkoreka		Basque Nationalist Party	Government Spokesperson	28 November 2016	8 September 2020	
Alfredo Retortillo		Socialist Party of the Basque Country–Basque Country Left	Minister of Tourism, Commerce and Consumption	28 November 2016	1 March 2019	
Sonia Pérez		Socialist Party of the Basque Country–Basque Country Left	Minister of Tourism, Commerce and Consumption	1 March 2019	8 September 2020	
María Jesús San José		Socialist Party of the Basque Country–Basque Country Left	Minister of Labour and Justice	28 November 2016	8 September 2020	
Arantza Tapia		Basque Nationalist Party	Minister for Economic Development and Infrastructure	28 November 2016	8 September 2020	
Cristina Uriarte		Independent	Minister of Education	28 November 2016	8 September 2020	
Bingen Zupiria		Basque Nationalist Party	Minister for Culture and Language Policy	28 November 2016	8 September 2020	
