= Idoia Mendia =

Spanish politician

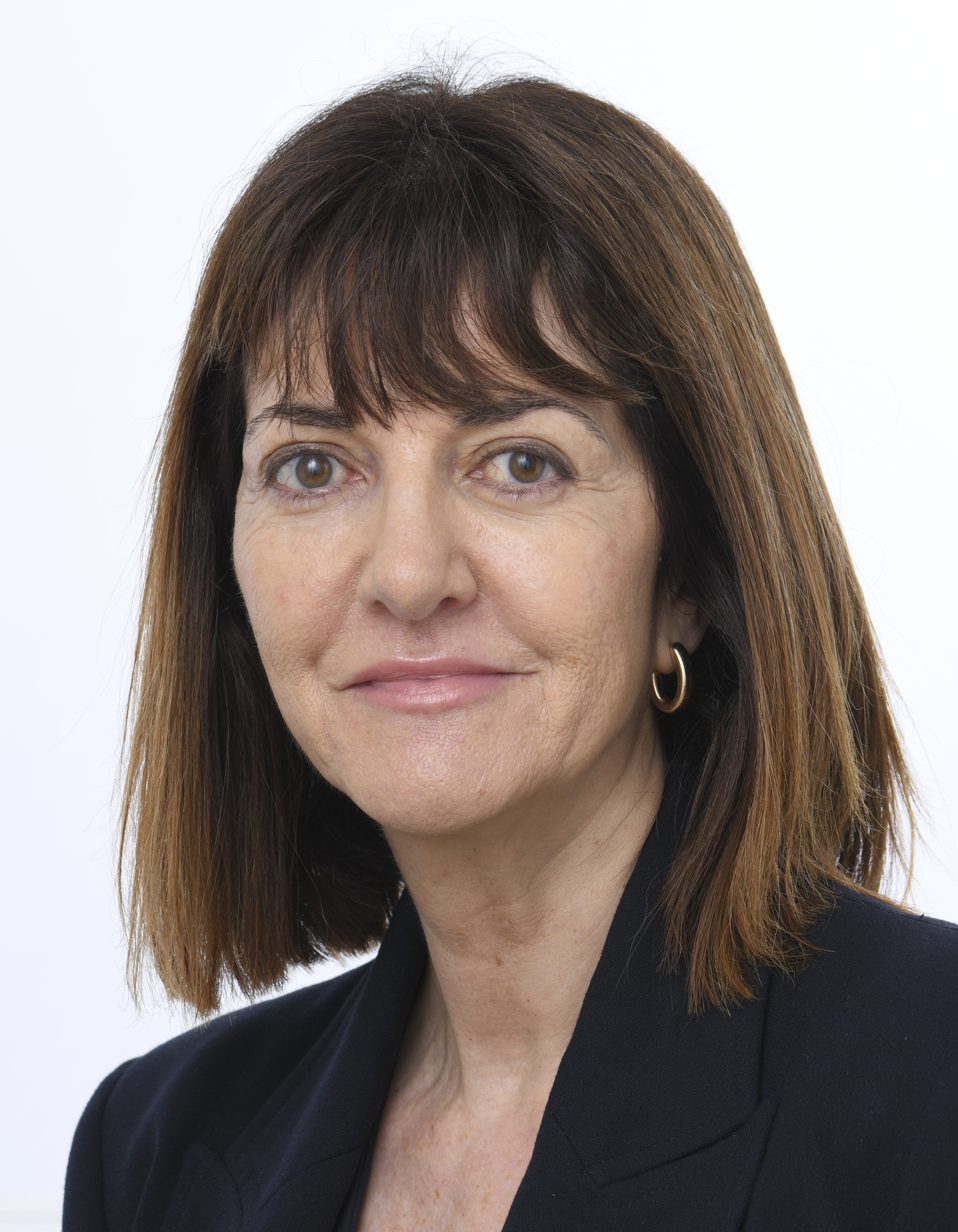

Second Vice Lehendakari of the Basque Government
- In office 8 September 2020 – 22 June 2024 Serving with Josu Erkoreka
- Lehendakari: Iñigo Urkullu
- Preceded by: Office established
- Succeeded by: Mikel Torres

Member of the European Parliament for Spain
- Incumbent
- Assumed office 16 July 2024

Member of the Basque Parliament
- In office 17 April 2002 – 9 September 2020

Personal details
- Born: Idoia Mendia Cueva; 27 October 1965 (age 60) Bilbao, Basque Country, Spain
- Party: PSE-EE
- Other political affiliations: PSOE
- Spouse: Alfonso Gil (m. 1996)
- Children: 2
- Education: University of Deusto; University of Amsterdam

Idoia Mendia Cueva (Basque pronunciation: [iˈðoi.a menˈdi.a]; born 27 October 1965) is a Spanish politician and since 2014 general secretary of the Socialist Party of the Basque Country–Basque Country Left. Since 2020, she serves as the Second Vice President and the Regional Minister of Labour of Employment in the Basque Government led by Iñigo Urkullu. Previously, from 2009 to 2012, she was the Regional Minister of Interior, Justice and Public Administration, and spokesperson of the Basque Government led by Patxi López.
