= First government of Iñigo Urkullu =

Regional government of Basque Country, Spain

The First Urkullu Government (the Basque Government of the 10th legislature) was the regional government of the Basque Country led by President (Lehendakari) Iñigo Urkullu between 14 December 2012 and 25 November 2016. It was formed in November 2016 after the regional election.

The Basque Parliament elected Iñigo Urkullu as President for the first time, with the support of the EAJ-PNV. The PNV formed a government that divided its functions into eight departments, each with one minister.

== History ==
On December 29, 2014, the Basque Government and the Generalitat agreed to oppose the "decentralization" measures in Madrid, using different strategies but respecting each other.

On 31 December 2015, Iñigo Urkullu stated that there would be an opportunity to "grow and create jobs" and that the Basque Country had a "right moment" because the foundations were "stronger".

== Government ==
Name	Portrait	Party	Office	Took office	Left office	^{Refs.}
Iñigo Urkullu		Basque Nationalist Party	Lehendakaria (President)	2012 December 14	2016 November 25	
Josu Erkoreka		Basque Nationalist Party	Justice and Public Administration	2012 December 17	2016 November 28	
Josu Erkoreka		Basque Nationalist Party	Spokesman	2012 December 17	2016 November 28	
Arantxa Tapia		Basque Nationalist Party	Basque Government Department of Economic Development and Competitiveness	2012 December 17	2016 November 28	
Juan Mari Aburto		Basque Nationalist Party	Basque Government Department of Employment and Social Policies	2012 December 17	2015 February 9	
Ángel Toña		Independent	Basque Government Department of Employment and Social Policies	2015 February 9	2016 November 28	
Ricardo Gatzagaetxebarria		Basque Nationalist Party	Basque Government Treasury and Finance Department	2012 December 17	2016 November 28	
Cristina Uriarte		Independent	Basque Government Department of Education, Language Policy and Culture	2012 December 17	2016 November 28	
Estefania Beltran de Heredia		Basque Nationalist Party	Basque Government Security Department	2012 December 17	2016 November 28	
Jon Darpon		Basque Nationalist Party	Basque Government Department of Health	2012 December 17	2016 November 28	
Ana Oregi		Independent	Eusko Jaurlaritzako Ingurumen eta Lurralde Politika Saila	2012 December 17	2016 November 28	
