= Javier Hurtado =

Spanish politician

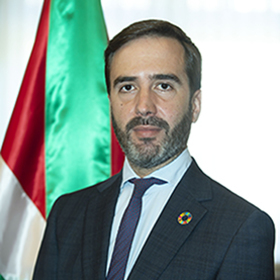
Javier Hurtado in 2020.

Javier Hurtado Domínguez (born 1981) is a Spanish politician. On 7 September 2020, he was appointed minister of tourism, commerce and consumption in the Basque Government led by Iñigo Urkullu. He is affiliated with the Socialist Party of the Basque Country–Basque Country Left party.
