= Home Office of the Basque Government =

Department of the Basque Government responsible for internal security

Department of Security
- Segurtasun Saila; Departamento de Seguridad

Agency overview
- Formed: 1936; 90 years ago
- Jurisdiction: Basque Government
- Headquarters: Vitoria-Gasteiz
- Agency executives: Estefania Beltran de Heredia, Minister; -, Vice Minister for the Interior; -, Vice Minister for Security; -, Vice Minister for Administration and Services
- Child agencies: Ertzaintza; SOS Deiak; Basque Police Academy
- Website: Official website

The Home office of the Basque Government or the Department of Security is the department responsible for the security of the Basque Country. This department was created in 1936 and restored in 1980. It is led by the nationalist Estefania Beltran de Heredia (from 2012).

== Organization ==
This department is divided into two sub departments. It comprises 12 directorates, 1 cabinet and 3 child agencies.

- Department of Security
  - Cabinet of the Minister
  - Directorate of Social Relations with Media
  - Directorate of Care to Victims of Terrorism
  - Directorate of Gender Violence Victims
  - Sub Department of Administration and Services
    - Directorate of Economic Management and Infrastructures
    - Directorate of Legal System and Services
    - Directorate of Human Resources
  - Sub Department of the Interior
    - Directorate of Emergencies and Meteorology
    - Directorate of Electoral Administration, Gambling and Shows
    - Directorate of Traffic
  - Sub Department of Security
    - Cabinet of the Vice Minister for Security
    - Ertzaintza - Basque Police
    - Directorate of Cabinet and Technical Resources
    - Directorate of Municipal Police Coordination and Private Security
