= Department of Economic Development and Competitiveness =

The Department of Economic Development and Competitiveness (Basque: Eusko Jaurlaritzako Ekonomiaren Garapen eta Lehiakortasun Saila; Spanish: Departamento de Desarrollo Económico y Competitividad ) is the department of the Basque Government responsible for the community's economic development, including industry, energy, international trade, tourism, agriculture and fisheries. The department was created in 2012 as part of a reorganisation of government departments.

== Ministers ==
- 1936-1947: Santiago Aznar
- 1947-1952: Fermin Zarza
- 1978-1980: Mikel Isasi
- 1980-1983: Javier Garcia
- 1983-1985: Juan Carlos Isasti
- 1985-1987: Jose Ignacio Arrieta
- 1987-1991: Ricardo Gonzalez
- 1991-1995: Jon Imanol Azua
- 1995-1999: Javier Retegi
- 1999-2001: Josu Jon Imaz
- 2001-2009: Ana Agirre
- 2009-2012: Bernabe Unda
- 2012-present Arantza Tapia
