= Josu Erkoreka =

Spanish politician

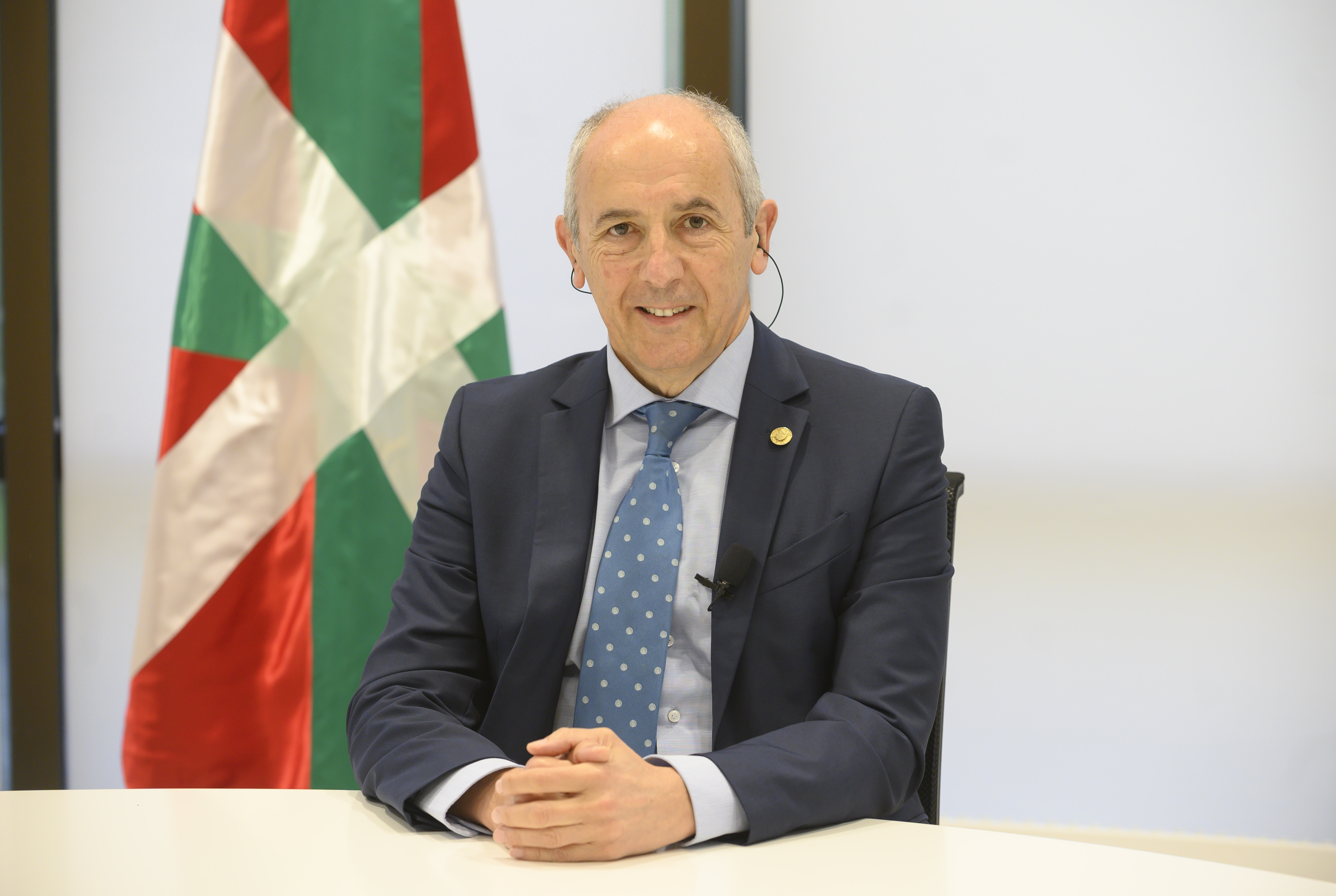

First Vice Lehendakari of the Basque Government Regional Minister of Security
- In office 8 September 2020 – 22 June 2024 Serving with Idoia Mendia
- Lehendakari: Iñigo Urkullu
- Preceded by: Idoia Zenarruzabeitia
- Succeeded by: Ibone Bengoetxea (First Vice Lehendakari); Bingen Zupiria (Minister of Security)

Josu Erkoreka (born 1963) is a Spanish politician affiliated with the Basque Nationalist Party.

From 28 November 2016 to 8 September 2020, he served as Minister of Public Governance and Self-Government and government spokesperson in the Second Urkullu Government led by Iñigo Urkullu. Drom 8 September 2020 to 22 June 2024 he served as First Vice Lehendakari and Minister of Security in the Third Urkullu Government.
