= Patxi López =

Spanish politician (born 1959)

Patxi López MP
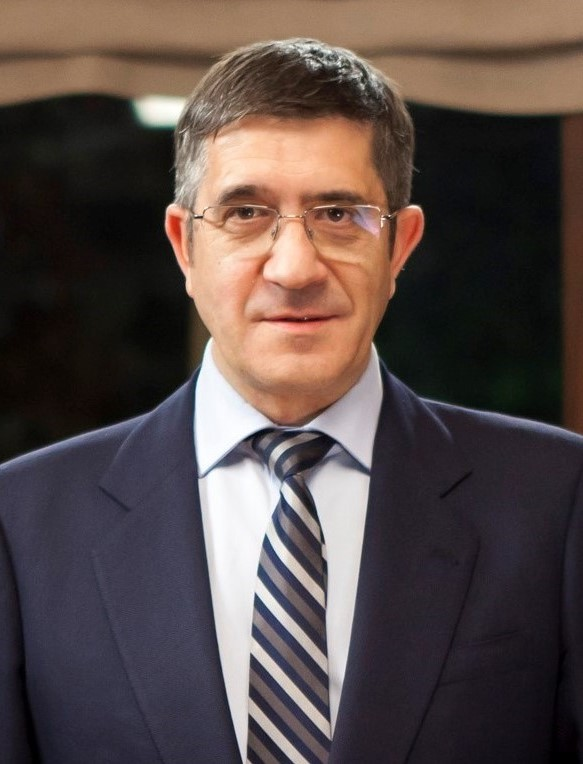

Leader of the Socialist Parliamentary Group in the Congress of Deputies
- Incumbent
- Assumed office 23 July 2022
- Preceded by: Héctor Gómez

President of the Congress of Deputies
- In office 13 January 2016 – 19 July 2016
- Monarch: Felipe VI
- Preceded by: Jesús Posada
- Succeeded by: Ana Pastor

Lehendakari of the Basque Government
- In office 7 May 2009 – 15 December 2012
- Monarch: Juan Carlos I
- Preceded by: Juan José Ibarretxe
- Succeeded by: Iñigo Urkullu

Secretary-General of the Socialist Party of the Basque Country
- In office 23 March 2002 – 16 December 2014
- Preceded by: Nicolás Redondo Terreros
- Succeeded by: Idoia Mendia

Member of the Congress of Deputies
- Incumbent
- Assumed office 13 January 2016
- Constituency: Biscay
- In office 17 November 1987 – 2 September 1989
- Constituency: Biscay

Member of the Basque Parliament
- In office 20 November 2012 – 22 September 2014
- Constituency: Alava
- In office 15 March 1991 – 20 November 2012
- Constituency: Biscay

Personal details
- Born: Francisco Javier López Álvarez; 4 October 1959 (age 66) Portugalete, Spain
- Party: Spanish Socialist Workers' Party
- Spouse: Begoña Gil
- Website: Official website

Francisco Javier "Patxi" López Álvarez (Spanish pronunciation: [ˈpatʃi ˈlopeθ]; born 4 October 1959) is a Spanish politician serving as Member of the Congress of Deputies and chair of the Constitutional Committee.

Previously, he has served as President of the Autonomous Community of the Basque Country from 2009 to 2012 and President of the Congress of Deputies, the lower house of the Spanish Cortes Generales, in the short lived 11th legislature from January 2016 to July 2016. He was also Secretary-General of the Socialist Party of Euskadi – Euskadiko Ezkerra (PSE-EE), the Basque affiliate of the Spanish Socialist Workers' Party (PSOE), from 2002 to 2014.

== Political career ==
López, born into a socialist family, was influenced early in life by the political stance of his father, Eduardo López Albizu, a prominent Spanish left-wing anti-Francoist activist. He joined the Young Basque Socialist movement in 1975, and was its Secretary-General from 1985 to 1988. He joined PSE in 1977, and was elected to the Spanish Congress of Deputies at the 1986 General Election representing Vizcaya Province. In the PSE he rose steadily to prominence before being elected Secretary-General in 1997, having become a Member of the Basque Parliament in 1991.

He is known for his opposition to Basque independence. In 2005, he was the PSE-EE's candidate for the presidency of the Basque Country, but lost out to Juan José Ibarretxe of the Basque Nationalist Party (PNV). In the 2009 election, the Nationalist Party was the party with the most votes with 30 seats, followed by the Socialist Party, with 25 seats. The illegalisation of a party representing a sizeable voting segment, the Left Basque Nationalist Party Batasuna, enabled the socialists to reach an agreement with the People's Party for López to be elected as Lehendakari (Basque president). He was elected to the position on 5 May 2009 in the Basque Parliament, effectively ending thirty years of Basque nationalist rule in the Basque Country, in what was perceived as a controversial election due to the absence of any party representing the secessionist Left Basque Nationalist spectrum.

On 13 January 2016, he was elected President of the Congress of Deputies for the short eleventh legislature, with 130 votes (the deputies of PSOE and Citizens) out of 350.

Party political offices
Preceded by Nicolás Redondo Terreros	Secretary-General of the Socialist Party of the Basque Country; 2002–2014	Succeeded by Idoia Mendia
Preceded by Héctor Gómez	Leader of the Socialist Group in the Congress of Deputies; 2022–present	Incumbent
Political offices
Preceded by Juan José Ibarretxe	President of the Basque Country; 2009–2012	Succeeded by Iñigo Urkullu
Preceded by Jesús Posada	President of the Congress of Deputies; 2016	Succeeded by Ana Pastor
