= Iñigo Urkullu =

Basque politician (born 1961), Prime Minister of the Basque Government (2012-2024)

The Most Excellent Iñigo Urkullu
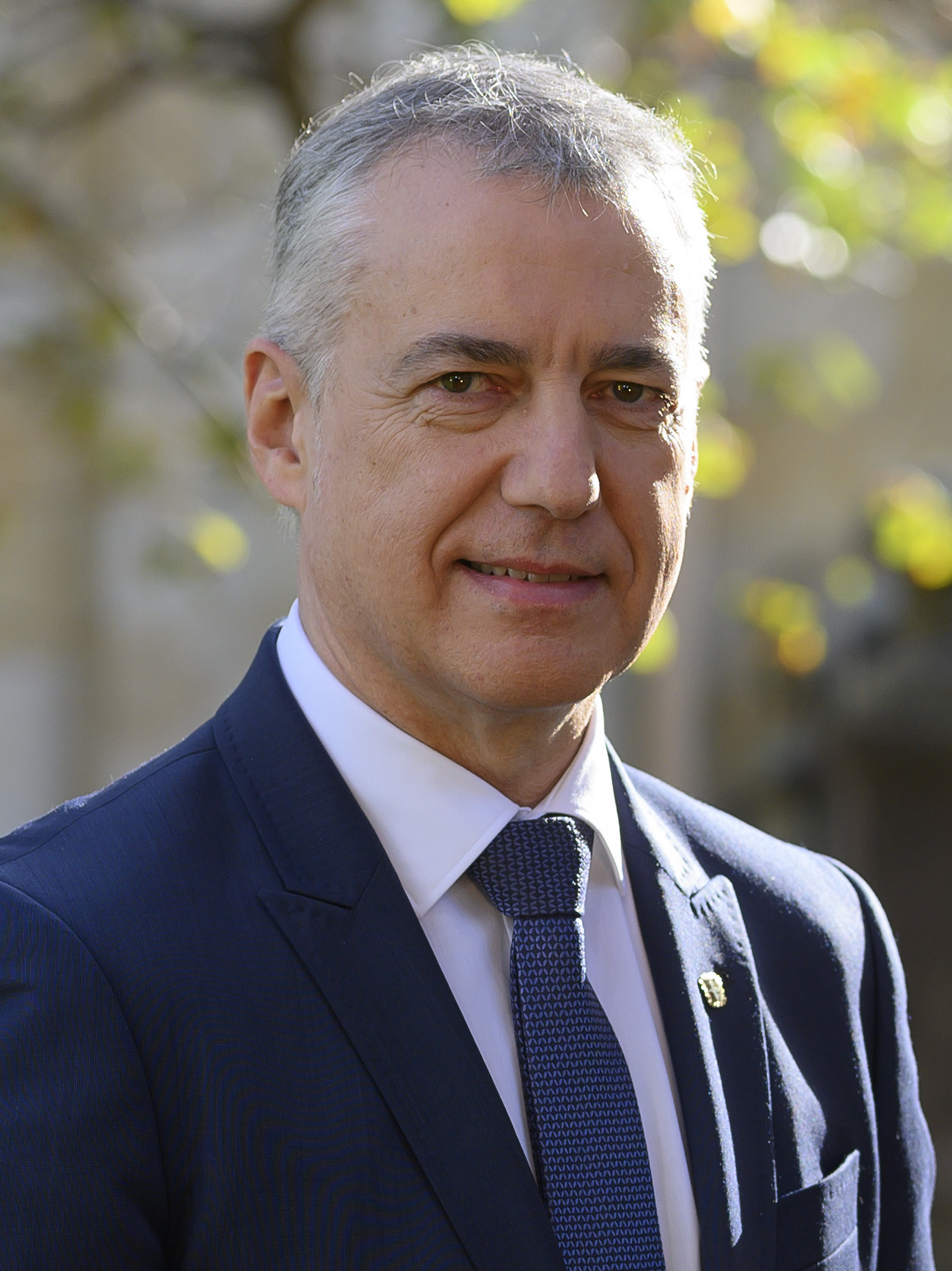
- Urkullu in December 2019

Lehendakari of the Basque Government
- In office 15 December 2012 – 21 June 2024
- Vice Lehendakari: Josu Erkoreka (First); Idoia Mendia (Second)
- Preceded by: Patxi López
- Succeeded by: Imanol Pradales

President of the Basque Nationalist Party
- In office 18 January 2008 – 15 December 2012
- Preceded by: Josu Jon Imaz
- Succeeded by: Andoni Ortuzar

Member of the Basque Parliament
- In office 20 November 2012 – 14 May 2024
- In office 30 November 1994 – 28 December 2007

Personal details
- Born: Iñigo Urkullu Renteria; 18 September 1961 (age 65) Alonsotegi (Biscay), Spain
- Party: Basque Nationalist Party (since 1977)
- Education: University of Deusto
- Profession: Teacher

Íñigo Urkullu Renteria (born 18 September 1961) is a Basque politician from Spain, and the Lehendakari (President) of the Basque Government from 2012 to 2024.

As the President of the Basque Government, he headed the First, Second, and Third Urkullu Governments of the Basque Autonomous Community, Spain.

== Early life and career ==
Iñigo Urkullu Renteria was born on 18 September 1961 in Alonsotegi, the only child of a Basque nationalist working-class family. His father was a turner and died when Urkullu was a child. His mother, Flori Renteria, was a housewife from Maruri-Jatabe, and she moved to Alonsotegi after her marriage.

Urkullu studied primary education in the Avellaneda School of Sodupe, Güeñes. He was a conscientious objector and enrolled to the University of Deusto to study Hispanic Philology, but dropped out to enrol in the Seminary of Derio to the Teaching degree, specializing in Basque Philology. He contemplated becoming a priest, eventually opting for practising as a teacher. He started working as a teacher at the Asti Leku Ikastola of Portugalete—where he taught future Lehendakari Imanol Pradales—and at the Félix Serrano School of Bilbao. Subsequently, he became a civil servant at the Landako School of Durango, where he is currently on leave of absence.

== Early political career ==
=== Rise to power ===
In 1977, at 16 years of age, Urkullu joined Euzko Gaztedi (EGI), the youth wing of the Basque Nationalist Party (PNV). He quickly rose in the party ranks, as he became a member of the executive body of EGI at 19 years old and was elected to the executive of the Biscayan PNV in 1984. He was director of Youth and Community Action of the Biscay Foral Government from 1987 to 1994. He was first elected to the Basque Parliament for Biscay in 1994, and was subsequently re-elected in 1998, 2001, 2005. (Note: According to the official website of the Basque Parliament, Urkullu was first elected to the Parliament in 1994. However, due to him previously serving as a representative of the Parliament in the social council of the University of the Basque Country from 1986 to 1987, some media outlets have misreported as him being first elected in 1984 or 1986.) He served as chair of the Human Rights commission for three legislatures. However, his parliamentary career was characterized his low profile and few interventions, since he was more involved in the internal party affairs.

Urkullu is a member of the "JoBuBi Generation" (Jóvenes Burukides Bizkainos), a group of young Biscayan PNV members that joined the party during the Transition and eventually took control of the whole party. Along with Urkullu, other JoBuBis were José Luis Bilbao, Andoni Ortuzar and Aitor Esteban. Eventually, in 1996, the group asserted its power over the Biscayan PNV when the JoBuBi-supported Javier Atutxa unseated Luis María Retolaza from the presidency of the Biscayan Executive Branch of the PNV (Bizkai Buru Batzar, BBB). Subsequently, Urkullu was appointed spokesperson and number two of the executive.

=== President of the BBB ===
Upon Atutxa's decision not to run for re-election in 2000, Urkullu was unanimously elected as the president of the BBB on 20 May 2000.

He was the Basque Nationalist Party (PNV) chairman from 2008 to 2013, when he was succeeded by Andoni Ortuzar since the party's rules do not allow a Lehendakari to be the party's chairman at the same time.

== Lehendakari ==
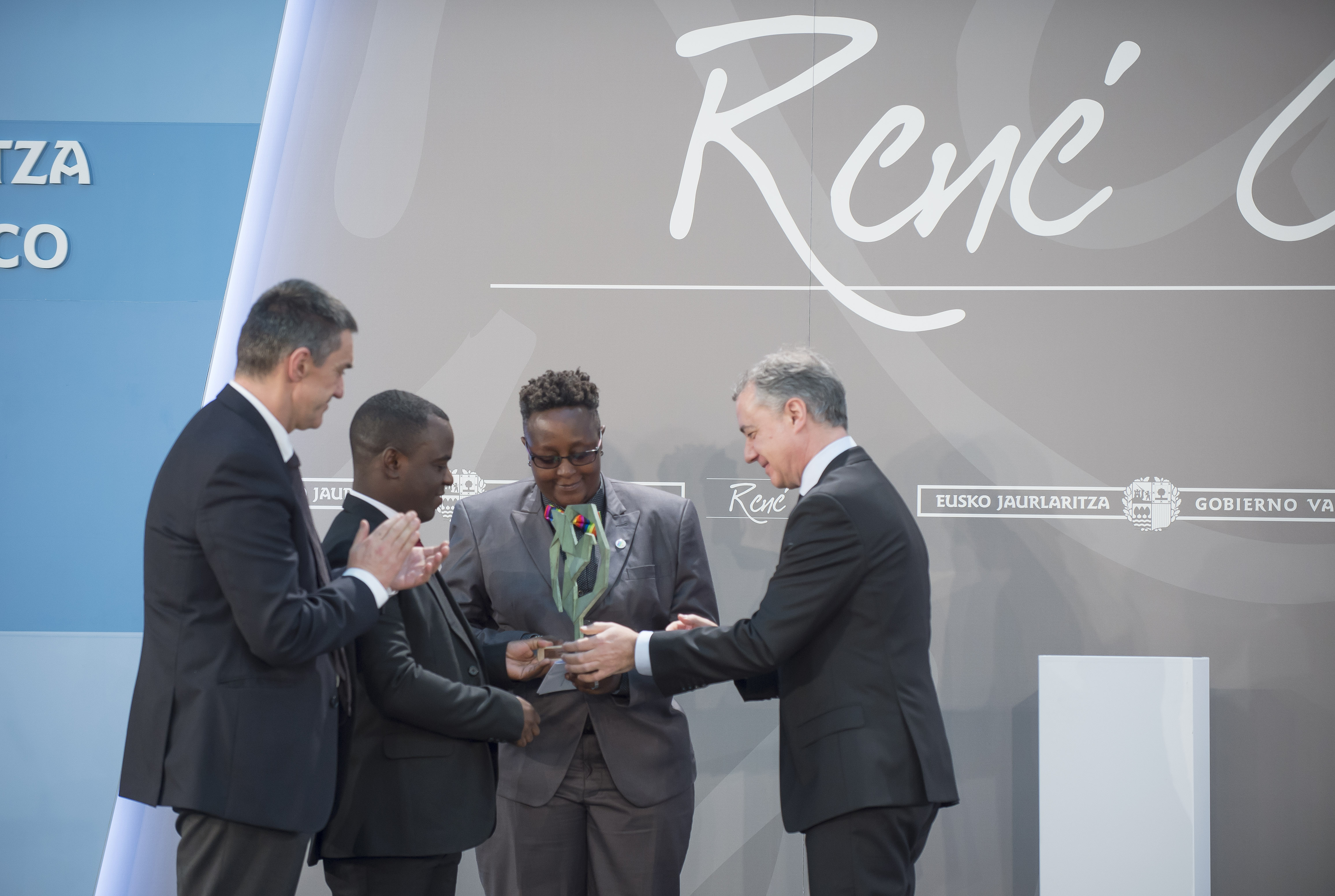
Urkullu (right) administers the 2017 René Cassin award to Sexual Minorities Uganda.

In 2017, he administered the René Cassin award to Sexual Minorities Uganda for their achievements in LGBT and human rights activism.

Amid the 2017-18 Spanish constitutional crisis, Urkullu tried to mediate between the Spanish and Catalan governments to avoid the declaration of independence and the application of Article 155, but these attempts failed. He declared as a witness in the Trial of Catalonia independence leaders on 28 February 2019.

He resided in Ajuria Enea, the official residence of the president of the Basque Government, until the end of his term.

== Notes ==
Political offices
Preceded by Patxi López	Lehendakari of the Basque Country; 2012–2024	Succeeded by Imanol Pradales
Party political offices
Preceded by Josu Jon Imaz	President of the Basque Nationalist Party; 2008–2012	Succeeded by Andoni Ortuzar
