= Lehendakari =

Head of government of the Basque Autonomous Community

President of the Basque government
- Eusko Jaurlaritzako lehendakaria
- Coat of arms of Basque Country

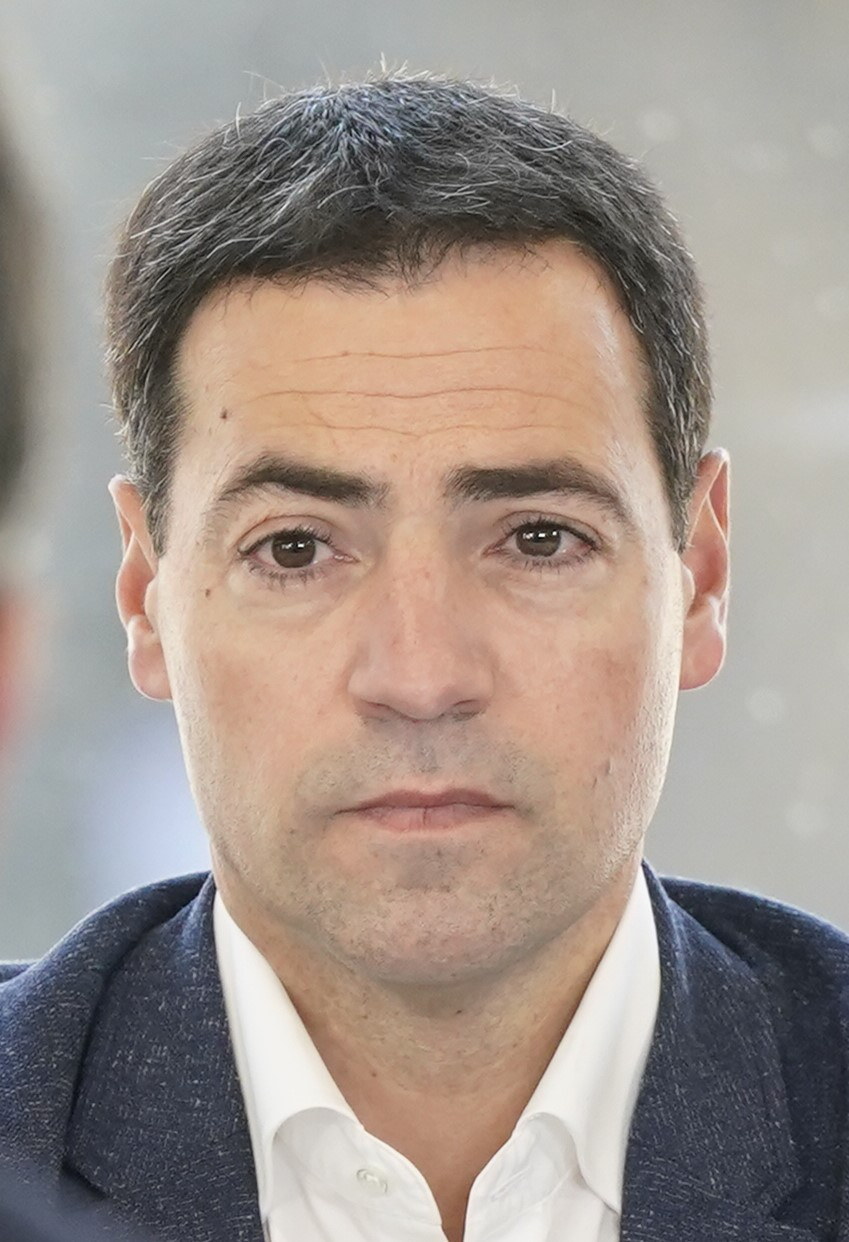
- Incumbent; Imanol Pradales since 22 June 2024
- Style: Excelentísimo Señor (m), Excelentísima Señora (f); Jaun Txit Agurgarria (m), Andere Txit Agurgarria (f)
- Residence: Ajuria Enea
- Seat: Lehendakaritza, Vitoria-Gasteiz
- Nominator: Basque Parliament
- Appointer: The Monarch countersigned by the Prime Minister
- Term length: Four years
- Inaugural holder: José Antonio Aguirre
- Formation: 6 October 1936
- Website: www.euskadi.eus/eusko-jaurlaritza/lehendakaritza/

The President of the Basque Government (Basque: Eusko Jaurlaritzako Lehendakaria, Spanish: Lehendakari del Gobierno Vasco), usually known in the Basque language as the Lehendakari (Basque: lehendakari, Spanish: lendakari), is the head of government of the Basque Autonomous Community. The lehendakari leads the executive branch of the regional government.

The current lehendakari is Imanol Pradales, of the Basque Nationalist Party.

The Basque noun lehendakari means "president" and can refer to the president of any country, club, association etc.

== History of the term ==
The term lehendakari is a 20th-century coinage, from the Basque lehendabizi ("first") and the suffix -ari which indicates a profession. Before the establishment of Standard Basque in the 1970s, it was spelled Euzko Jaurlaritzaren Lendakari. Both lendakari (president) and jaurlaritza (government) are Basque neologisms created by members of the Basque Nationalist Party.

The generic Basque words for "president" and "government" are both lehendakari(a) and presidente(a) for the former, and gobernu(a) for the latter, being presidente(a) and gobernu(a) words loaned from Latin.

Since the very moment when the noun lehendakari was coined, both lehendakari(a) and presidente(a) have been used as perfect synonyms to refer to the head of any public or private government organ. So lehendakari, in Basque language, is not only the name of the president of the Basque autonomous community, but also the name officially used to refer to the head of the Chartered Community of Navarre, the head of a parliament, the head of a rugby club, the head of a hiring board, the head of a board of directors, etcetera.

On the other hand, the word lehendakari is commonly used in Spanish, both in and outside the Basque region, to refer exclusively to the Basque president, comparable to the use of Taoiseach as the title of the Irish head of government in English.

Lehendakaris elected for the PNV have sworn office following a ritual established by Aguirre: next to the Guernica Tree, on a Bible in Basque, using a symbolic formula which reads "before God, prostrated, standing on Basque land, remembering the ancestors, under the Guernica Tree and before you, representatives of the Basque people, I swear thus, to fulfill the mandate granted to me as Lehendakari, and will thus be duly protecting and respective of the laws of this land".

Former lehendakari Patxi López used a similar formula in the same place, but also included visible changes to it by suppressing the "before God, prostrated" part and the fact that he sworn on a Basque Statute of Autonomy rather than on a Bible.

== See also ==
- List of Lehendakaris
- Ajuria Enea
- Basque Government
- Basque Parliament
