= Arturo Alcoceba =

Spanish politician (1952–2025)

Secretary General of the Basque Nationalist Party in Güeñes
- In office 1982–1986

Personal details
- Born: Arturo Alcoceba Isusi; 4 December 1952 Güeñes, Spain
- Died: 4 July 2025 (aged 72)
- Party: Basque Nationalist Party

Arturo Alcoceba Isusi (4 December 1952 – 4 July 2025) was a Spanish politician with a Basque nationalist ideology belonging to the Basque Nationalist Party, He was president of the PNV in Güeñes.

== Life and career ==
Alcoceba was born in Sodupe (Güeñes) on 4 December 1952 into a Basque nationalist family with two sons and two daughters. His sister is Paquita Alcoceba, a Basque politician, and her brother-in-law Luis Laiseka, also a politician. His maternal grandfather was Cipriano Isusi, a Basque politician and militiaman who fought in the Euzko Gudarostea (army of the Government of Euzkadi) during the Spanish Civil War and who was imprisoned in the El Puerto de Santa María prison, along with politicians Juan de Ajuriaguerra and Jesús María Leizaola.

As a young man, he joined Euzko Gaztedi Indarra (EGI) and the Basque Nationalist Party (PNV), forming part of the municipal executive of the party in Güeñes. Part of the "PNV in hiding" in the Franco regime, he was part of one of the most politically active towns, organizing clandestine meetings, placing ikurriñas, graffiti, distribution of propaganda, illegal concentrations, bonfires on the summits on the eve of Aberri Eguna, etc.

As a result of all the political activities, he was arrested by the Civil Guard on 7 March 1975. They were taken to the La Salve barracks of the Civil Guard in Bilbao and were tortured. They were arrested and tried for "subversive activity" ("subversive graffiti", attendance at "illegal meeting", etc.). His lawyer in prison was Xabier Arzalluz, president of the PNV, who led his defense and the party paid the bail imposed. When in Spain the new king (Juan Carlos I) came to the throne, they were amnestied.

In 1977, Alcoceba was one of the founders of the batzoki of Sodupe, when they began to be legal. In 1980, they presented some amendments in the batzoki, in relation to the batzoki and the party and that generated a great controversy. Arzalluz, as president of the PNV at that time, went to the batzoki of Sodupe and after the controversy he expelled them from the batzoki, although they continued to maintain a friendship relationship. That year Alcoceba and those expelled founded the "Jator Enea association", as a place of political and cultural meeting. The Jator Enea association and its headquarters had a presence, with the creation of Eusko Alkartasuna, in the controversy of the political headquarters. Alcoceba always defended the sovereignist sector of the PNV, the current of Arzalluz and Juan José Ibarretxe, being a strong defender of the Ibarretxe Plan.

In 1977, Alcoceba participated in the creation of the newspaper Deia, where he worked together with Iñaki González, Kepa Intxaurbe and Andoni Ortuzar, among others. In 1986, with the creation of Eusko Alkartasuna and the newspaper promoted by that party Gaur Express (1988–1989), the newspaper's management asked Alcoceba to join the newspaper, but he rejected it and stayed in Deia.

Alcoceba was part of the municipal council of the PNV in Güeñes and presided over it, going on the electoral lists on multiple occasions. He died on 4 July 2025, at the age of 72.
