= Jesús María de Leizaola =

Spanish Basque politician (1896–1989)

Jesús María Leizaola
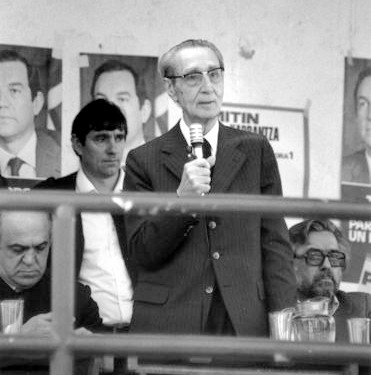

2nd Lehendakari of the Basque Country-in-exile
- In office 22 March 1960 – 16 December 1979
- Preceded by: José Antonio Aguirre
- Succeeded by: Ramón Rubial (as President of the Basque General Council); Carlos Garaikoetxea (as President)

Personal details
- Born: Jesús María de Leizaola Sánchez; 7 September 1896 San Sebastián, Gipuzkoa, Spain
- Died: 16 March 1989 (aged 92) San Sebastián, Gipuzkoa, Basque Country, Spain
- Party: Basque Nationalist Party (PNV)
- Spouse: María del Coro Loidi Zulaica (m. 1924)
- Education: University of Valladolid

Jesús María de Leizaola Sánchez (7 September 1896 – 16 March 1989) was a Spanish politician and was named President of the Basque Government in exile after José Antonio Aguirre's death in 1960.

== Early years (1896–1931) ==
Jesús María de Leizaola Sánchez was born to a wealthy family on Calle Getaria in San Sebastián on 7 September 1896. His parents were José Zacarías Leizaola and Cándida Sánchez. He was the third of seven children. Leizola qualified in law at the University of Valladolid and, in 1915, he began work for the government of Gipuzkoa, becoming exposed to nationalist politics. In 1919, he became head of the planning section for the Municipality of Bilbao where he joined the Basque Nationalist Party (EAJ-PNV).

In 1922, he led a march calling for the creation of a Basque University in Gernika during which he was arrested along with the editor of Euzkadi. They were forced to march to Amorebieta before being freed. He rose up the ranks of Bilbao's city government before leaving in 1925 to take on the administration of the bankrupt Crédito de la Unión Minera and becoming more involved politically.

== Second Spanish Republic (1931–37) ==
Leizaola was elected a member of Parliament in July 1931 in the Spanish Republic which existed from 1931 to 1939. Having returned to San Sebastian to resume his career in civil administration in 1933, he was one of the principal city officials who maintained order there and assisted in the evacuation when the Spanish Civil War broke out in 1936. He left his home town of San Sebastian in September 1936 and would not return for 40 years.

Leizaola assisted in the creation of the government of Aguirre in October 1936 and was named as regional minister for Justice and Culture. (Note: The first Basque government had four members of the Partido Nacionalista Vasco (Basque Nationalist Party): Jose Antonio Aguirre (President and Defense), Jesús María de Leizaola (Justice and Culture), Eliodoro de la Torre (Finance) and Telesforo Monzón (Interior). There were three members of the Partido Socialista Obrero Español (Spanish Socialist Workers' Party): Santiago Aznar (Industry), Juan Gracia Colás (Welfare) and Juan de los Toyos (Labor). The other members were Gonzalo Nárdiz (Agriculture) of Acción Nacionalista Vasca (Basque Nationalist Action), Ramón María Aldasoro Galarza (Trade) of the Izquierda Republicana (Republican Left), Alfredo Espinosa (Health) of Unión Republicana (Republican Union) and Juan Astigarrabía (Public Works) of the Partido Comunista de España (Communist Party of Spain).)

In this role he acted for the Lehendakari and as a spokesman for the government, and ran the government's newspaper. He founded the Basque University in Bilbao he had protested for years before, although it only lasted a few months before the troops of Franco entered the city. Leizaola was responsible for attempting to organise the defence and then the evacuation of the city.

== Exile and return (1937–89) ==
Going into exile in 1937, Leizaola transferred to Santander, then Barcelona. In 1939 he settled in Paris, where he worked to denounce the regime in Spain and keep his dream of freedom and Basque self-government alive. He was sworn in as Lehendakari at the funeral of Aguirre in 1960, but unlike his predecessor, he lacked a charisma enabling to garner the consensus of different political forces around him. In that respect, his office saw also the confirmation of Juan Ajuriaguerra's split with the young rising separatist movement ETA. During the last years of Franco's regime in Spain, he was particularly active at the Vatican in calling for a restoration of democracy and autonomy. He was able to enter the Spanish Basque Country secretly in 1974 visiting Gernika and Bilbao. In 1979, after 43 years of exile, Leizaola came back home, helping set the grounds for a democratic regime and a Basque autonomy. He was welcomed at the San Mamés Stadium by thousands of people. The next day in a formal ceremony he symbolically transferred the role of Lehendakari to Carlos Garaikoetxea, democratically elected president of the Basque council. In 1980, he was elected to the Basque Parliament for the PNV, but retired from politics not long after.

Leizaola's nephew, Joseba Leizaola, later served as the third President of the Basque Parliament from 1990 to 1998.

== Sources ==
- Arrieta Alberdi, Leyre (2007). "Años de esperanza ante la nueva Europa: la estrategia europeísta del PNV tras la Segunda Guerra Mundial". Ayer (in Spanish) (67, Las relaciones de España con Europa centro-oriental (1939-1975)). Asociacion de Historia Contemporanea and Marcial Pons Ediciones de Historia. JSTOR 41325180.
- "Jesús María Leizaola Sánchez". Biografías y Vidas. 2015.
- Leizaola Elkargoa (20 February 2013). "Jesús María de Leizaola. Biografía" (in Spanish).

| Preceded by José Antonio Aguirre | Lehendakari (Basque President); 1960-1978 | Succeeded by Carlos Garaikoetxea |
