= Telesforo Monzón =

Spanish politician

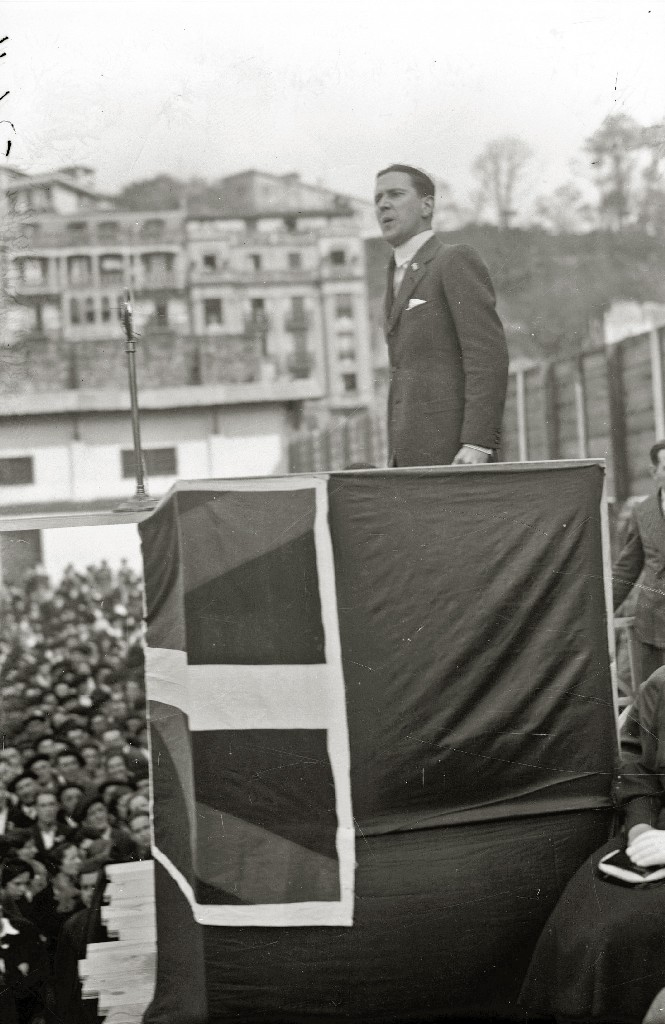
Telesforo Monzon at Aberri Eguna celebrations, 1933.

Telesforo de Monzón y Ortiz de Urruela (1 December 1904, Bergara – 9 March 1981, Bayonne) was a Spanish writer and politician. He played an important role within Basque nationalism.

== Biography ==
Telesforo Monzón was born on December 1, 1904, in the municipality of Bergara (Gipuzkoa), into a wealthy aristocratic family. Monzón was an important leader of the Basque Nationalist Party (PNV) during the Second Republic and the Spanish Civil War.

As president of the PNV in Gipuzkoa, during the spring of 1936 he attended a clandestine meeting held in San Sebastián with representatives of parties such as Renovación Española, the CEDA or Falange; Telesforo Monzón agreed to collaborate in the civil-military conspiracy against the Popular Front government that was underway, although it specified that they had "men, but no weapons." In a later meeting Monzón would point out that if the uprising was led by the Carlists, the PNV would join them and they would fight "until the end".

After the outbreak of the Civil War, however, he remained in the Republican zone and collaborated with the new regional government led by José Antonio Aguirre. In 1937, after the conquest of Biscay by Franco's army, he left Spain and went into exile. He lived in France for nearly forty years. During this period he underwent an ideological conversion that led him to distance himself from the PNV and move closer to the principles of the Abertzale left.

After Franco's death, he became a major figure in the movement for Basque independence and was one of the founders of the left-wing coalition Herri Batasuna. At the 1979 General Election he was elected to the Spanish Congress of Deputies representing Gipuzkoa Province, the same district which he had represented from 1932 to 1936 during the Spanish Second Republic. He served until March 1980 when he resigned from the parliament. In the 1980 Basque regional election he was elected to the Basque parliament. He died in March 1981 and was buried in his native Bergara.

== Sources ==
- González, Damián A.; Ortiz, Manuel; Pérez, Juan Sisinio (2016). La Historia, lost in translation? Actas del XIII Congreso de la Asociación de Historia Contemporánea. Ediciones de la Universidad de Castilla La Mancha. ISBN 978-84-96467-98-9.
- Martínez Rueda, Fernando (2016). "Telesforo Monzón, del nacionalismo aranista a Herri Batasuna: las claves de una evolución". Revista de Estudios Políticos (174). Centro de Estudios Políticos y Constitucionales: 267–297. ISSN 0048-7694.
- Sudupe, Pako 2011: 50eko hamarkadako euskal literatura II. Kazetaritza eta saiakera, Donostia, Utriusque Vasconiae. ISBN 978-84-938329-5-7
