= College of the Savior =

Private school in Zaragoza, Aragon, Spain

- Spanish: Colegio del Salvador

Location
- Calle del Padre Arrupe; Zaragoza, Aragon; Spain
- Coordinates: 41°37′56.5″N 0°54′5.83″W

Information
- Former name: Spanish: Jesus-Maria El Salvador Colegio de Zaragoza
- Type: Private primary and secondary school
- Religious affiliation: Catholicism
- Denomination: Jesuit
- Established: 1879; 147 years ago
- Director: Andrés García Inda
- Grades: K-12; including baccalaureate
- Gender: Co-educational
- Website: www.jesuitaszaragoza.es

College of the Savior (Spanish: Colegio del Salvador, formerly Spanish: Jesus-Maria El Salvador Colegio de Zaragoza) is a private Catholic primary and secondary school located in Zaragoza, Aragon, Spain. The school was founded by the Society of Jesus in 1879. It includes primary through baccalaureate.

== Academics ==
Colegio del Salvador is a Jesuit school located in the Romareda neighborhood of Zaragoza. Construction began in 1877.

The school has two classrooms dedicated to students who suffer from a communication and relationship disorders, like autism.

In 2013 the school won the National Award for Education for Development "Vicente Ferrer" for its participation in Global Solidarity Week which focuses on global citizenship, solidarity, commitment to the eradication of poverty and its causes, and human and sustainable development.

== Notable students and staff ==
- Álvaro Arbeloa - footballer
- Xabier Arzalluz - politician
- Luis Buñuel - filmmaker
- Ander Herrera - footballer
- Longinos Navás - naturalist, botanist and Spanish entomologist
- María Teresa Fernández de la Vega - politician

== See also ==
- Catholic Church in Spain
- Education in Spain
- List of Jesuit schools
