= Sabin Etxea =

Building in Biscay, Spain

Coordinates: 43.2632°N 2.9277°W

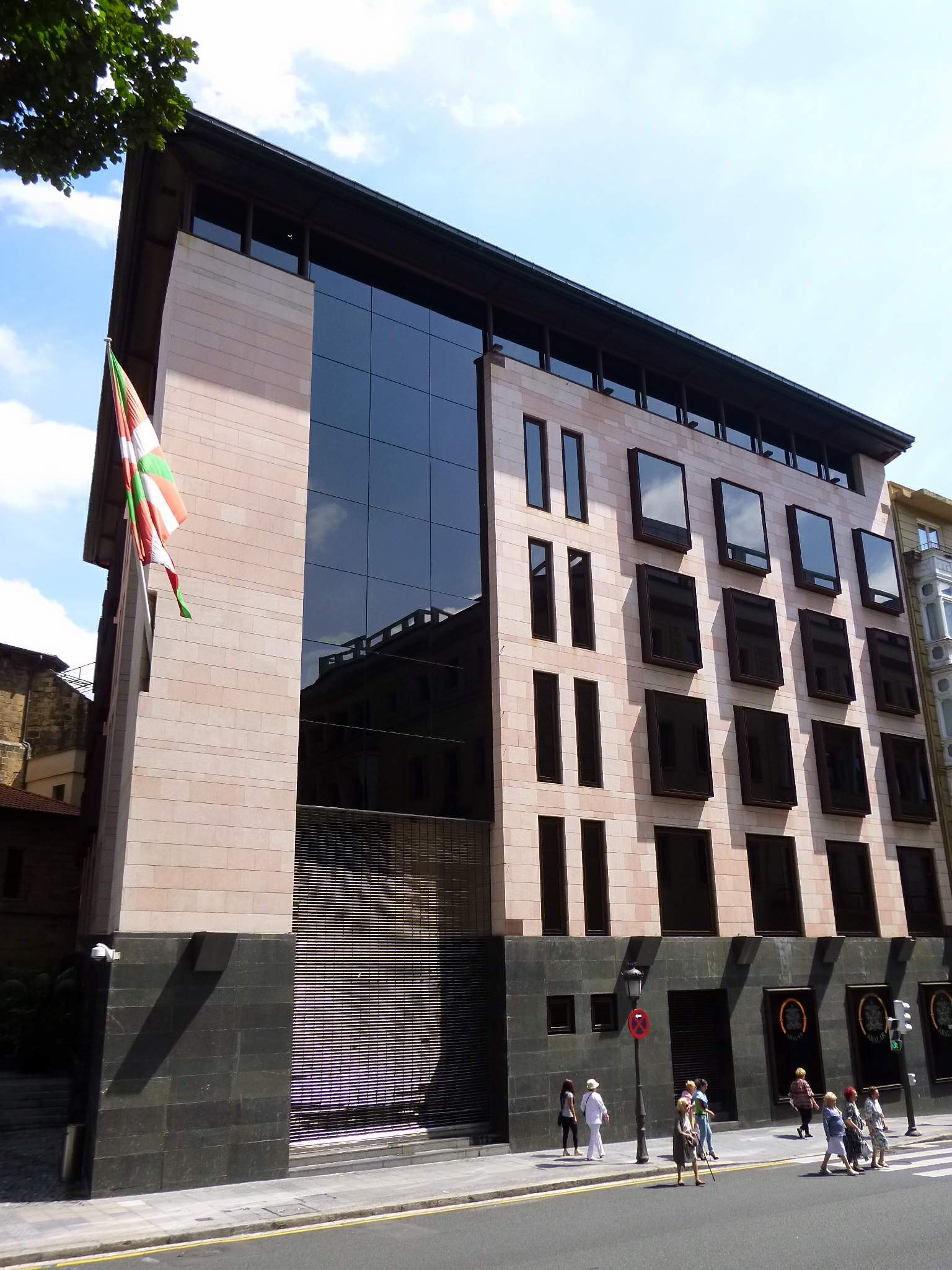
Sabin Etxea

Sabin Etxea (English: Sabin's House, named after Sabino Arana) is the official headquarters of the Basque Nationalist Party, located in Abando, Bilbao.

== History ==
In 1857, Santiago Arana, who owned a shipyard in the Bilbao basin, decided to build a home for his family in Ibáñez Street, Bilbao. Sabino Arana, considered the father of Basque nationalism and the founder of the Basque Nationalist Party, lived there most of his childhood and adolescence. In Sabin Etxea, Arana's first political statements were made. In 1898, the building was attacked by Spanish nationalists by throwing stones at it. At the end of the century, the family decides to sell the property because of financial reasons.

In 1931, Basque nationalists at the Bilbao Ensanche said a batzoki was needed for assembly, and most members of the party proposed the Sabin Etxea for its historical value. The building was finally rented by the BNP, and rent was paid by membership fees and voluntary donations. Sabin Etxea was used for both cultural and political purposes, including Basque language and dances classes, conferences, excursions, and many others.

By January 1932, a nationalist holiday was organized, coinciding with Aberri Eguna. However, the event was postponed to March 26, 27, and 28. On March 27, 1932, the first Aberri Eguna takes place. Many Basque nationalists from all over the Basque went to Bilbao for the occasion. A parade finished in front of Sabin Etxea, where a plaque was unveiled in remembrance of Sabino Arana.

In 1933, as the Basque nationalist movement grew, the Spanish government tried to stop it by arresting the seven members of the Bizkai Buru Batzar and closing the whole batzoki. However, charges were withdrawn two weeks after the incidents.

This important site for Basque Nationalism was purchased and held vacant for many years, before it was acquired by the Basque Nationalists to become a place for their headquarters.
