= Euzko Gaztedi =

Political party in Spain

Euzko Gaztedi Indarra
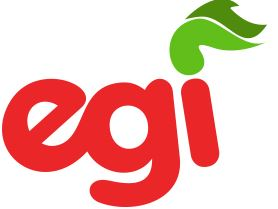
- The new EGI logo
- Abbreviation: EGI
- Formation: 1904
- Headquarters: San Sebastián, Bilbao, Vitoria, Bayonne, Pamplona
- Region served: Basque Country
- Members: 3,000
- Parent organization: EAJ-PNV
- Affiliations: Young Democrats for Europe
- Website: Euzko Gaztedi
- Remarks: Basque Nationalist youth group

Euzko Gaztedi Indarra-EGI (Basque for "Basque Youth Force") is the youth wing of the main Basque nationalist political party, the Basque National Party (EAJ-PNV). Their presence is limited to the Basque Country, encompassing the Basque Autonomous Community, the Chartered Community of Navarre and Northern Basque Country. Its statutes define it as a solely Basque organisation advocating for democracy, political plurality and participation, independence and humanism, looking to achieve a framework of respect for the identity and sovereignty of peoples and human rights.

In 2026, Euzko Gaztedi is celebrating the 90th anniversary of the first Basque government.

Old EGI symbol

== See also ==
- Politics of France
- Politics of Spain
- Sabino Arana
- Carlism
- José Antonio Aguirre
- Ikurriña
- Eusko Abendaren Ereserkia
