= Xabier Arzalluz =

Basque politician (1932–2019)

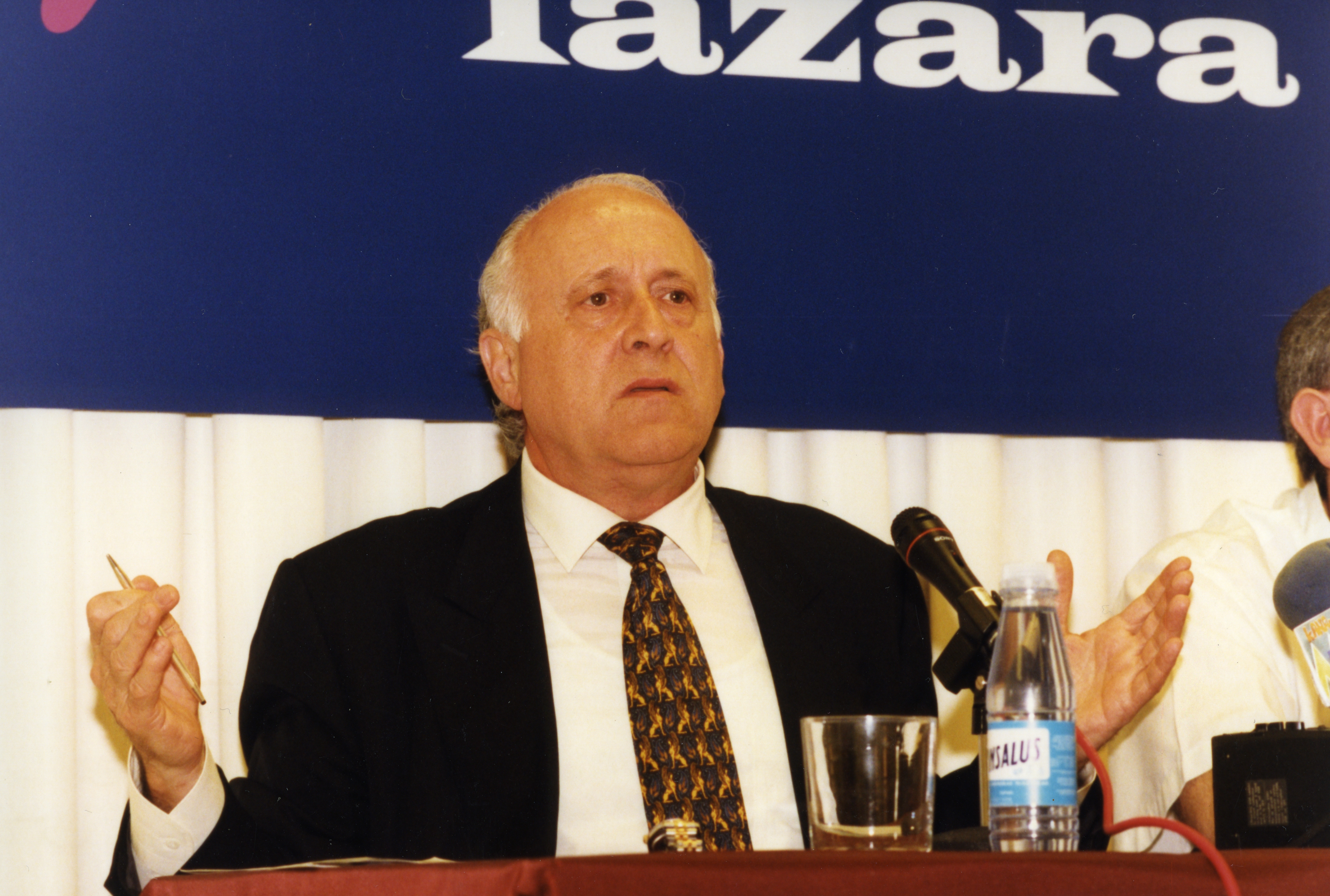
- Arzalluz in 1996

25th [[President of the Basque Nationalist Party]]
- In office 18 January 1987 – 18 January 2004
- Preceded by: Jesús Insausti
- Succeeded by: Josu Jon Imaz

22nd [[President of the Basque Nationalist Party]]
- Preceded by: Carlos Garaikoetxea
- Succeeded by: Román Sudupe

Member of the Congress of Deputies
- In office 15 June 1977 – 1 February 1980
- Constituency: Gipuzkoa

Personal details
- Born: 24 August 1932 Azkoitia, Gipuzkoa, Basque Country
- Died: 28 February 2019 (aged 86) Bilbao, Biscay, Basque Country
- Party: Basque Nationalist Party
- Education: Zaragoza University

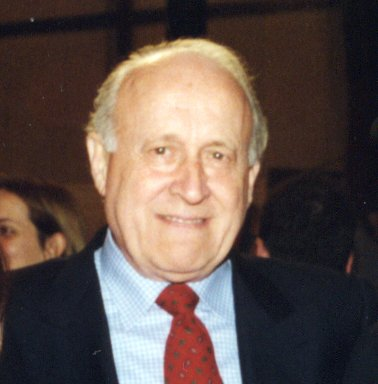
Xabier Arzalluz.

Xabier Arzalluz Antia (24 August 1932 – 28 February 2019) was a Basque politician, leader of the Basque Nationalist Party from 1979 until 2004. He was a nationalist and a Christian Democrat, considered during the period one of the most powerful politicians in the Basque Autonomous Community, making strategic decisions for the party he led from 1986 onwards.

== Early years ==
Arzalluz was born in Azkoitia, Gipuzkoa, Basque Country. From a Carlist family, he studied in a Jesuit school in Durango. During the 1960s, he received degrees in Law and Philosophy at the University of Zaragoza. He spent some time in Frankfurt-am-Main preparing a thesis on German Christian Democracy and studying Theology. He became a Jesuit priest. After another period in Frankfurt and Madrid, he worked at the Jesuit University of Deusto. In 1969, he joined the clandestine Basque Nationalist Party, mentored by the pre-war leader Juan de Ajuriaguerra. In 1971, he was admitted to the leadership of the Biscayan branch. He was laicized and got married.

== Spanish transition to democracy ==
In 1977 and 1979, he was elected as a member of the Spanish Congress of Deputies for the PNV in Gipuzkoa. His talks with Adolfo Suárez paved the way to the Statute of Autonomy of the Basque Country, contributing to its wording. He accordingly designed a strategy for the party along the lines of that Statute, called the Spirit of Arriaga. In 1979, he resigned his seat and succeeded Carlos Garaikoetxea as PNV leader, a position that he would hold until 2004. During his rule the PNV maintained its dominant position in the political life of the Autonomous Community of the Basque Country.

== Later career ==
Later in the 1980s, Garaikoetxea, the ruling lehendakari, struggled for autonomy from the party. Arzalluz, however, asserted the authority of the organization over individual members. This issue, among others, led in 1984 to a schism within the PNV, and to the creation of a new party Eusko Alkartasuna, led by Garaikoetxea.

Arzalluz was the main spokesman for the Basque Nationalist Party, publishing his opinions every Sunday in the Basque newspaper Deia and in many public speeches during PNV rallies, some of which took place on Party Day and on the Day of the Basque Homeland. While liked by PNV voters, he was the least popular party leader among the general Spanish public in 1997.

He was a professor of Constitutional Law (in the Basque language) at the University of Deusto in Bilbao.

== Death ==
He died in Bilbao on 28 February 2019 aged 86.
