= Luis María Bandrés =

Spanish politician

Luis María Bandrés (Basque: Luis Mari Bandrés) (18 February 1944 Pasaia - 2 December 2009) was a Spanish politician who served as the leader of the Basque Nationalist Party (PNV).

Bandrés was born on 18 February 1944 and was a native of Pasaia, Guipúzcoa. He worked as a professor at the la Escuela Universitaria de Ingenieros Técnicos Industriales in San Sebastián from 1965 until 1969.

Bandrés was described as a Basque nationalist. He served as the Minister of Culture within the Basque government of José María Ardanza, as well as the Guipúzcoa Provincial Council. He became a Basque parliamentarian as a member of the Basque Nationalist Party and the party's executive leader in Guipúzcoa. He later became the leader of the Basque National Party (PNV) and continued to serve in that capacity until his death in 2009.

Luis María Bandrés died on 2 December 2009 after a long illness, at the age of 65. His funeral was held at Santa María parish in San Sebastian.
