= Josu Jon Imaz =

Spanish chemist and politician

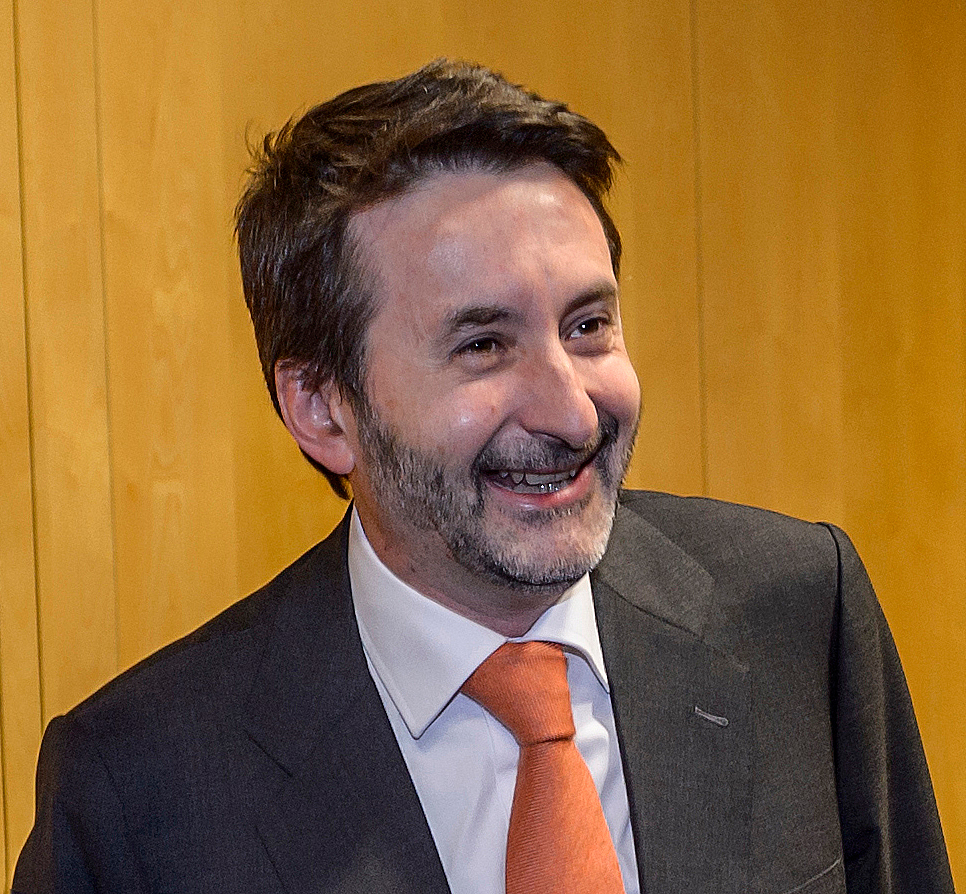

Member of the European Parliament for Spain
- In office 12 June 1994 – 7 January 1999

Personal details
- Born: 1963 (age 62–63) Zumarraga, Gipuzkoa, Spain
- Party: Basque Nationalist Party (since 1978)
- Education: University of the Basque Country
- Profession: Chemist

Josu Jon Imaz San Miguel is a Spanish politician, executive and scientist from Zumarraga, Basque Autonomous Community, Spain, born in 1963. He is CEO of the oil company Repsol. Doctor in Chemical sciences from the University of the Basque Country.

He pursued a political career in the Basque National Party since the early 1990s until the mid-2000s, as an MEP, spokesperson of the Basque autonomous government, and chairman of the party, succeeding Xabier Arzalluz.

== Training ==
Josu Jon Imaz San Miguel has a PhD in chemical sciences from the University of the Basque Country. He graduated from the Faculty of Chemical Sciences in San Sebastian. He received the Extraordinary Prize of Degree. He specialised in polymers. He received training in Business Management in 1989–1990, as part of the Ikasbide General Management Training Plan of the Mondragón Cooperative Group.

He completed his PhD dissertation at the Higher Institute of Industrial Engineering in Bilbao (1994). In December 1986 he was sent by the INASMET Technology Centre to the French CETIM centre, having received a grant from the Ministry of Industry and Energy as part of their overseas training programme for researchers.

== Professional career ==
Manager of the Composites and Polymers Unit of INASMET from 1987 to 1989. He joined the Mondragón Cooperative Group from 1989 to 1991 as an industrial developer. Manager of the Marketing and External Relations Department of INASMET from 91 to 94. After time off spent in politics, he resumed his academic career as a visiting researcher at the Harvard Kennedy School.

In 2008 he returned to the business world as president of Petronor, a Repsol group company headquartered in Muskiz, near Bilbao. In 2010 he became director of Repsol's New Energies Unit with the aim of identifying opportunities, developing projects and carrying out business initiatives in areas such as bioenergy and renewable energy for transport. In 2012 he became a member of Repsol's executive committee, as executive director of the Industrial and New Energies Unit. In November 2011, he was elected President of the Spanish Association of Petroleum Operators (A.O.P.).

In 2024, he warned against the focus of the European Union on decarbonization and its effect on the competition of European industries. Similar earlier opinions expressed in the Davos Forum had been reproached by the Spanish minister for ecological transition Teresa Ribera, accusing him of denial and arguing for delay. He was supported by PNV MEP Izaskun Bilbao.

== Political life ==
In June 1994 he was elected Euro-Deputy to the European Parliament, a post that he held until his appointment on 7 January 1999 as Regional Minister of Industry, Trade and Tourism of the Regional Government of the Basque Country. As a regional minister of Industry, he was president of the Basque Energy Entity (EVE), president of the Society for Industrial Promotion and Reconversion (SPRI) and spokesman for the Basque Regional Government. In January 2004 he was elected chairman of the executive committee of EAJ-PNV. In autumn 2007, he announced his decision not to stand for re-election and ended his career in politics.

== Awards and acknowledgements ==
In 2006 he was awarded the Creu de Sant Jordi (St. George Cross), by the Catalan Regional Government.
