= Dios, patria y rey =

Motto in Spanish of Carlism

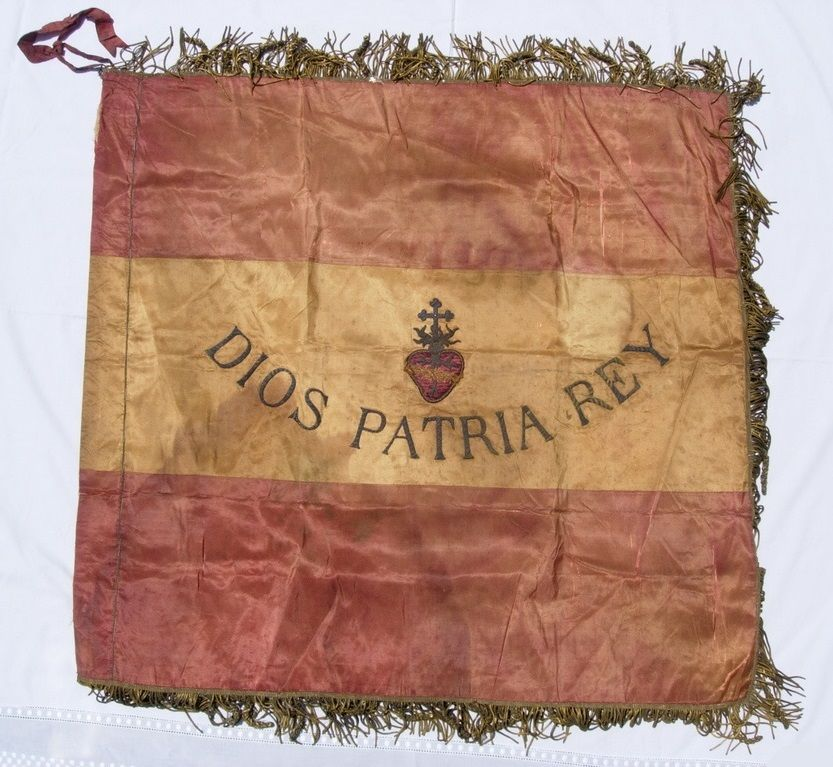
Carlist flag from about 1875 with the motto and the Holy Heart of Jesus.

Dios, patria y rey was a motto of Carlism. These three words (which can be translated as "God, Fatherland and king"), have been the motto and cornerstone of Carlism throughout its existence. What Carlism understood by these was:

- Dios (God): Carlism believes in the Catholic Faith as a cornerstone of Spain, and must be politically active in its defense.
- Patria (Fatherland): Carlism is heavily patriotic, Traditionalism sees the Fatherland as the nesting of communities (municipal, regional, Spain) united under one.
- Rey (King): The concept of national sovereignty is rejected. Sovereignty is vested on the king, both legitimate in blood and in deeds, from the Carlist branch of the House of Bourbon. But this power is limited by the doctrine of the Church and the Laws and Usages of the Kingdom, and through a series of Councils, traditional Cortes and state-independent intermediate bodies. The King must also be the Defender of the Poor and Keeper of Justice.

Not infrequently the motto appears in another version, namely as "Dios, Patria, Fueros, Rey".

== Derivations ==
The Basque Nationalist Party formed among Basque Carlists who substituted Spanish nationalism with Basque nationalism and rejected the kings of Spain. In consequence, their motto was Jaungoikoa eta Lagi-zaŕa, "God and the Old Laws".

When the clerical faction of Carlism rejected the claimant and separated as integrism, their motto was Viva Cristo Rey, ("Long live Christ the King")
