= Aitor Esteban =

Spanish jurist and politician

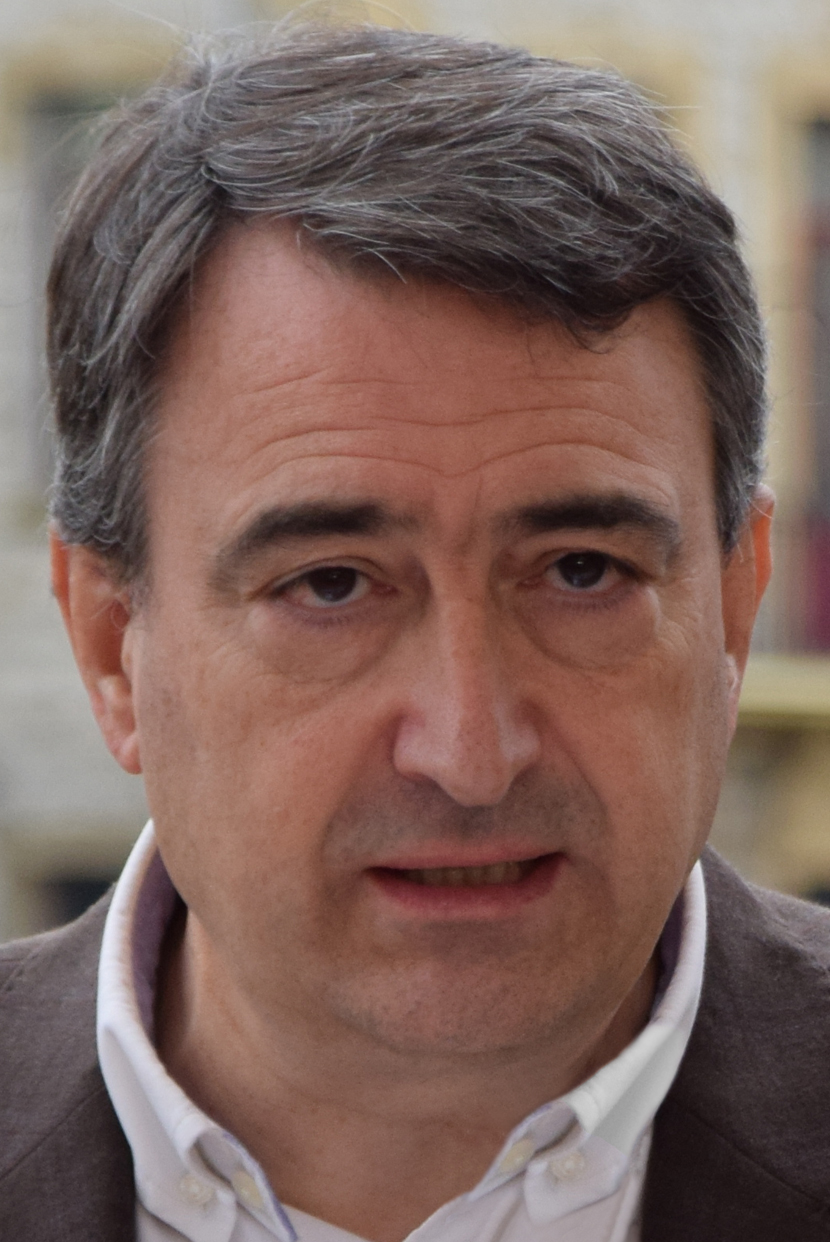

President of the Basque Nationalist Party
- Incumbent
- Assumed office 30 March 2025
- Preceded by: Andoni Ortuzar

Spokesperson of the Basque Group in the Congress of Deputies
- In office 18 December 2012 – 29 March 2025
- Preceded by: Josu Erkoreka
- Succeeded by: María Vaquero
- Parliamentary group: Basque Group (EAJ-PNV)

Member of the Congress of Deputies
- In office 14 April 2004 – 29 March 2025
- Constituency: Biscay

Speaker of the General Assembly of Biscay
- In office 28 May 1995 – 25 May 2003
- Preceded by: Antxon Aurre
- Succeeded by: Ana Madariaga

Personal details
- Born: Luis Aitor Esteban Bravo; 21 June 1962 (age 64) Bilbao, Spain
- Party: Basque Nationalist Party
- Spouse: Itxaso Atutxa Atutxa
- Children: 2
- Education: University of Deusto
- Occupation: Law professor and politician
- Website: Profile at the PNV

Aitor Esteban Bravo (born 21 June 1962) is a Spanish jurist and politician. He is the president of the Basque Nationalist Party since March 2025 and was from 2012 to 2025 the party's Spokesperson in the Congress of Deputies.

== Biography ==
Esteban's mother is from the Province of Soria and his father is from the Province of Biscay. Esteban studied in the Corazón de María School of Bilbao and he studied baccalaureate in the Central High School of Bilbao. Later, he studied law in the University of Deusto. He supports the Basque independence but he also considers himself as very pragmatic.

Esteban holds a PhD in Law from the University of Deusto and has been a professor at the same university of the subjects of Constitutional Law and the Institutional System of the Basque Country, Administrative Law and Indigenous History and Culture of North America and Mesoamerica. He is also an expert in Native American Culture and a scholar of the native legislation.

He is married to Itxaso Atutxa, a high-ranking member of the Basque Nationalist Party. They have two children.

=== Political career ===
Esteban joined the Basque Nationalist Party (PNV) at the age of 16 and in 1983 he was appointed Secretary of the youth branch of the PNV. Two years later he was appointed a representative in the PNV's General Assembly, and in 1991 he became spokesperson and secretary of the presidency of the General Assembly of Biscay. From 1995 to 2003 he was the President (or Speaker) of the General Assembly of Biscay.

Esteban made the leap to national politics in 2004 when he was elected MP to the Congress of Deputies for Biscay in the 2004 general election. He was re-elected in the general elections of 2008, 2011, 2015, 2016, April and November 2019, and 2023. In 2012 he was appointed Spokesperson of the Basque Group in Congress a position he held until March 2025.

In March 2025 Esteban was elected president of the PNV as successor of Andoni Ortuzar.
