= Andoni Ortuzar =

Spanish politician and journalist

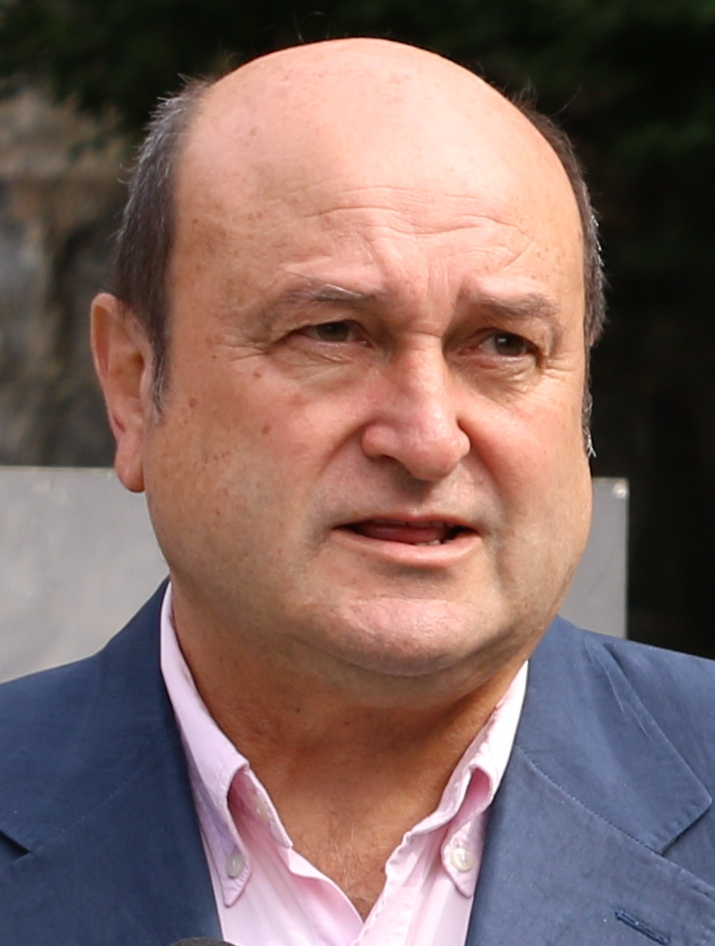

President of the Basque Nationalist Party
- In office 12 January 2013 – 30 March 2025
- Preceded by: Iñigo Urkullu
- Succeeded by: Aitor Esteban

Personal details
- Born: Andoni Ortuzar Arruabarrena; 13 July 1962 (age 63) Abanto y Ciérbana-Abanto Zierbena (Biscay), Basque Country, Spain
- Party: Basque Nationalist Party
- Occupation: Journalist

Andoni Ortuzar Arruabarrena (born 13 July 1962) is a Spanish politician from the Basque Country and journalist, and was from 2013 to 2025 the president of the Basque Nationalist Party (PNV).

== Early life ==
Andoni Ortuzar was born on 13 July 1962 in Sanfuentes, in the mining zone (Biscay) in Spain. He studied the "sciences of information", branch of journalism, at the University of the Basque Country.

After finishing his studies he worked as an editor for Radio Popular de Bilbao and in 1981, he joined the newspaper Deia where he remained until 1987. At Deia, he was head of the Labor and Euskadi-Politics sections. The ELA activist belonged to the works council.

A member of the PNV since 1979, he joined the Department of Presidency, Justice and Development of the Basque Government as an advisor in 1987 and occupied different positions related to communications and foreign relations in the following years. In 1999 he was appointed director of the public radio and television station EITB, a position he left in 2007 to become president of the PNV in Biscay as successor of Iñigo Urkullu, whom he also followed as president of the PNV in 2013, a position he held until 2025. During his time in office, the PNV won the elections to the Basque Parliament three times (obtaining most votes and seats) and formed a government together with the socialist party. In 2018 he was instrumental in deciding that the deputies of PNV in the Spanish Parliament would support the motion of no confidence that brought down the government of Mariano Rajoy and elected Pedro Sánchez instead. In 2025 he decided not to stand for reelection as strong support for his eventual successor Aitor Esteban became apparent.
