= Carlos Garaikoetxea =

Spanish politician (1938–2026)

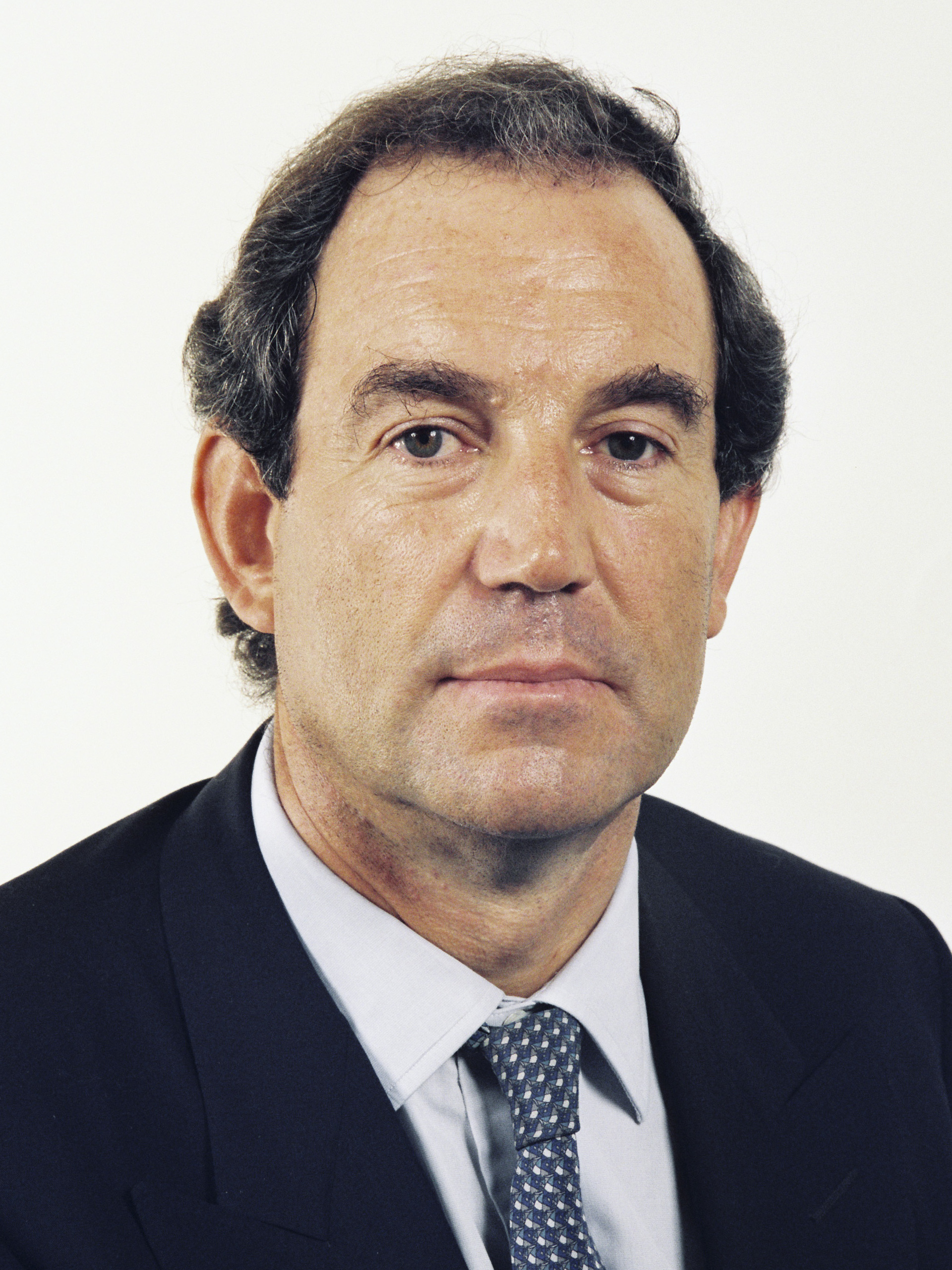
- Official portrait, c. 1989

Lehendakari of the Basque Government (Note: President of the Basque General Council until 15 April 1980, when the Basque Government was established in virtue of the Statute of Gernika.)
- In office 9 June 1979 – 26 January 1985
- Vice President: Mario Fernandez
- Preceded by: Ramón Rubial (as President of the CGV); Jesús María Leizaola (in exile)
- Succeeded by: José Antonio Ardanza
Parliamentary offices
Member of the Basque Parliament
In office 18 December 1990 – 20 March 2001
Constituency	Gipuzkoa
In office 31 March 1980 – 24 July 1987
Constituency	Gipuzkoa
Member of the European Parliament for Spain
In office 6 July 1987 – 14 March 1991
Succeeded by	Heribert Barrera
Member of the Parliament of Navarre
In office 23 April 1979 – 13 July 1980
Constituency	Pamplona (rest)

Personal details
- Born: 2 June 1938 Pamplona, Navarre, Spain
- Died: 4 May 2026 (aged 87) Pamplona, Navarre, Spain
- Party: EA (1986–2026)
- Other political affiliations: PNV (1975–1986)
- Spouse: Sagrario Mina

Carlos Garaikoetxea Urriza (2 June 1938 – 4 May 2026) was a Basque Spanish politician who served as Lehendakari of the Basque Government from 1979 to 1985, the first following the Spanish transition to democracy. Elected as a member of the Basque Nationalist Party (PNV), he presided over the party from 1977 to 1980. After leaving the PNV, he founded and presided over Eusko Alkartasuna from 1987 to 1999 and served as a member of the European Parliament from 1987 to 1991.

== Early life and career ==
Carlos Garaikoetxea Urriza was born on 2 June 1938 in Pamplona, Navarre, to Juan Garaicoechea and Dolores Urriza, both natives of the Navarrese mountains. His father was a Carlist sympathizer and spoke Basque, whereas his mother's inability to do so prevented Garaikoetxea from learning the language. He studied at schools of the Marist Brothers and Piarists, where, aged 12–13, he self-learned Basque. During those years he became interested in Basque nationalism through the reading of books about Arturo Campion and Basque history.

Upon completing his baccalaureate, he attended the University of Deusto and earned two licentiates in economics and law. Following the end of his studies, he joined the private sector and held numerous positions of higher responsibility, eventually serving as president of the Chamber of Commerce of Navarre from 1962 to 1972.

== Political career ==
Garaikoetxea joined the Basque Nationalist Party (PNV) in 1975 and became president of the Navarrese Executive Branch of the PNV (Napar Buru Batzar). In March 1977, he was elected president of the Central Executive Branch of the PNV (Euzkadi Buru Batzar, EBB) in the first assembly of the party after the death of Francisco Franco. The first Navarrese leader of the PNV, his election was credited to his origin and charisma. He failed to be elected to the Congress of Deputies in the June 1977 general election as the leader of the Navarrese Autonomist Coalition that included the PNV. During the drafting of the Spanish Constitution, rifts emerged between Garaikoetxea and Xabier Arzalluz, leader of the PNV in the Congress of Deputies. Eventually, the former's radical position prevailed, and the PNV called to abstain from voting on the constitutional referendum.

=== Lehendakari: 1979–1985 ===
In 1979, he was elected president of the Basque General Council, the provisional body preparing the devolution of powers to the Basque Country prior to the approval of the Statute of Autonomy. Once approved, Garaikoetxea was elected Lehendakari in 1980 and reelected in 1984.

During his presidency the Basque Statute of Autonomy was developed. As Lehendakari, Garaikoetxea inaugurated the radio-television public broadcast service EiTB on 31 December 1982. During his term, important self-government institutions were created: the Basque Public Health System (Osakidetza) and the Ertzaintza, the Basque police service, which was directed by his close collaborator Juan Porres Azkona from 1982 until 1986. During the floods of August 1983, he managed both Basque and Spanish emergency services in order to solve the resulting problems. The economy recovered through the revision of the Basque Economic Agreement.

On 19 December 1984, Garaikoetxea announced his pending resignation as Lehendakari due to the loss of support from his own party. Major divergences had arisen between him and the now president of the EBB Arzalluz over the Law of Historical Territories and the expulsion of the Navarrese branch of the party. He was replaced by José Antonio Ardanza in 1985.

=== President of EA: 1987–1999 ===
Soon after, the breach inside the party was complete and Eusko Alkartasuna was founded, with Garaikoetxea becoming its president and candidate for the Basque Presidency, a role that he held until 1999, when he retired from politics. He was elected as deputy in the Basque Parliament in all successive elections until 1998. He was also a Member of the European Parliament from 1987 to 1991.

== Death ==
Garaikoetxea suffered a heart attack on 4 May 2026, while swimming in a sports centre in Pamplona. Despite being successfully resuscitated at the scene, he died later that day at around 16:30 CEST, at the age of 87, at the University Hospital in Navarre.

== Notes ==
Political offices
Preceded by Ramón Rubial	President of the Basque General Council; 1979–1980	Succeeded by Himself (as Lehendakari)
Preceded by Himself (as President of the Basque General Council)	Lehendakari; 1980–1985	Succeeded by José Antonio Ardanza
Party political offices
Preceded by Ignacio Unceta	President of the Basque Nationalist Party; 1977–1980	Succeeded by Xabier Arzalluz
Preceded by Manuel Ibarrondo	President of Eusko Alkartasuna; 1987–1999	Succeeded by Begoña Errazti
Preceded by Jaak Vandemeulebroucke	President of the European Free Alliance; 1990–1991	Succeeded by Jaak Vandemeulebroucke
