= Isaac López Mendizábal =

Basque writer

Isaac López Mendizabal (11 April 1879 – 27 February 1977) was a historian, intellectual, printer, editor and politician from the Basque Country, Spain, president of Euzkadi Buru Batzar (EBB), the executive body of the Partido Nacionalista Vasco (PNV), from 1931 to 1935. He was the son of Eusebio López Martínez.

== Career ==
Born in (Tolosa, Gipuzkoa, Spain), López Mendizábal earned two PhDs — one in letters and a second in law — as well as a business management degree at the Jesuit University of Deusto. He was a prominent militant of the Basque Nationalist Party, which he led during much of the period of the Second Spanish Republic, i.e., until the dictator Francisco Franco completed the overthrow of democracy in 1939. He had been a municipal councillor in his hometown of Tolosa, elected in 1931.

After Franco seized power and occupied Spain, including the Basque Country, López Mendizábal went into exile in France; his extensive library was looted and burned by the occupying troops.

During the subsequent Nazi occupation of France, he and a fellow anti-fascist, Andrés de Irujo, emigrated to Argentina, where they jointly founded Ekin, a publishing house that made a significant contribution to Basque historiography. He was a law professor at the University of Buenos Aires until he returned to Spain in 1965, during the waning years of Franco's tyranny, to start a printing company.

He was the author of numerous historical studies, a member of the group that created Euskaltzaindia, otherwise known as the Royal Academy of the Basque Language. His fervent defence of the Basque language was reflected in the publication of numerous dictionaries and manuals of language instruction.

== Works ==
- Cantabria, the Cantabrian War and the Basque Country in the time of Augustus (doctoral thesis in Philosophy and Letters).
- Fueros de Guipúzcoa (doctoral thesis on law).
- Aita Santu amargarren Pio'ren doctriña laburra (1904)
- Spanish-Basque conversation manual (1908)
- Basque-Castilian Dictionary (1916)
- Xabiertxo
- The comic "Poxpolin" (1935)
- The Basque Language, Grammar. Conversation, Dictionary (1943)
- Brief History of the Basque Country (1946)
- Abbreviated Grammar (1954)
