= Santoña Agreement =

1937 Basque surrender in the Spanish Civil War

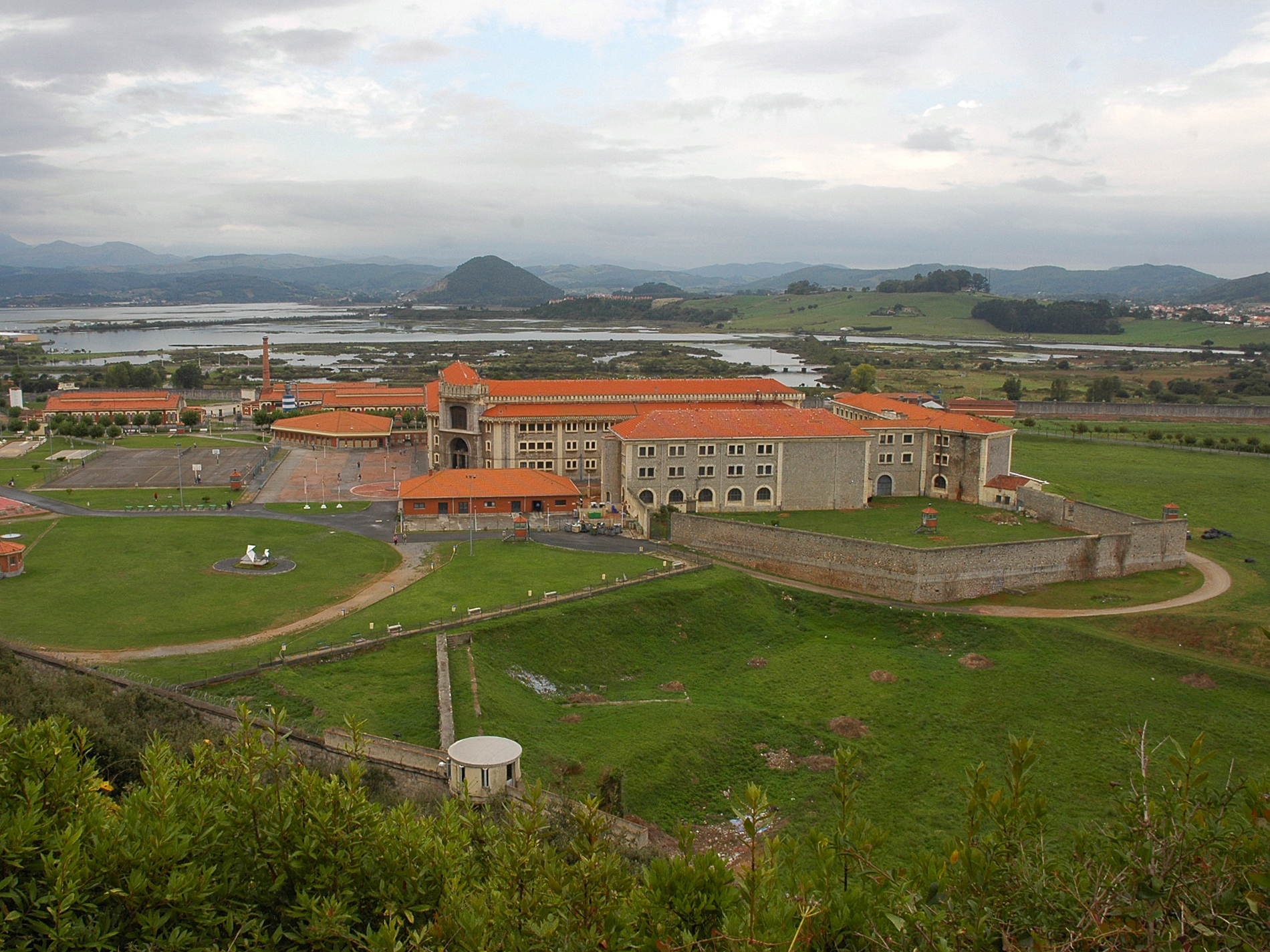
El Dueso Prison in Santoña, where Basque troops were held

The Santoña Agreement, Pact of Santoña or Santoña Treason, was an agreement signed in Guriezo, near Santoña, Cantabria, on 25 August 1937 during the Spanish Civil War between politicians close to the Basque Nationalist Party (PNV), fighting for the Spanish Republicans, and Italian forces fighting for Francisco Franco. The treaty was considered treason against the Spanish Republic.

After the fall of Bilbao, almost all of Basque territory had fallen into Franco's hands. Juan de Ajuriaguerra, the president of the Biscay Regional Council of the PNV, negotiated a surrender agreement with the Italian army command. The PNV offered to surrender the Basque army in exchange of its prisoners being treated as prisoners-of-war under Italian command and PNV members being allowed to go to exile on British ships.

The Basque nationalist units of the Republican army in the Basque territory, fighting under the direction of Basque President José Antonio Aguirre, met at Santoña and surrendered to the Italian forces on 24 August. When news of the agreement arrived to his headquarters, Franco cancelled the agreement and ordered the immediate jailing of the 22,000 captured soldiers in Santoña's El Dueso prison camp. Three months later, around half of them had been freed, and the other half remained in prison, and 510 were sentenced to death, a smaller proportion than registered in reprisals elsewhere. Ajuriaguerra, the highest-ranked member of the PNV, was released from prison in 1943.

== See also ==
- Military history of Spain

== Bibliography ==
- Cándano, Xuan. El pacto de Santoña (1937): La rendición del nacionalismo vasco al fascismo (Madrid: La Esfera de los Libros, 2006) ISBN 84-9734-456-1 (Spanish)
- Granja Sainz, J.L. de la, Entre el pacto de San Sebastián y el de Santoña (1930-1937) (Madrid: Historia 16, 1998). 271 (Spanish)
