= José Antonio Aguirre (politician) =

Basque nationalist leader in the mid-20th century

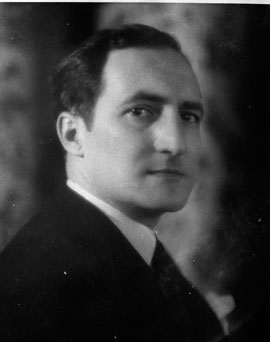

1st President of the Basque Country
- In office 7 October 1936 – 22 March 1960
- Preceded by: Office established
- Succeeded by: Jesús María de Leizaola

Personal details
- Born: José Antonio Aguirre Lecube; 6 March 1904 Bilbao, Spain
- Died: 22 March 1960 (aged 56) Paris, France
- Party: Basque Nationalist Party
- Occupation: Lawyer
Association football career
- Position: Forward
Senior career*
Years	Team	Apps	(Gls)
1921–1925	Athletic Bilbao		
- * Club domestic league appearances and goals

José Antonio Aguirre y Lecube (6 March 1904 – 22 March 1960) was a Spanish politician and activist in the Basque Nationalist Party. He was the first president of the Provisional Government of the Basque Country and the executive defense advisor during the Spanish Civil War. Under his mandate, the Provisional Government formed the Basque Army and fought for the Second Spanish Republic.

== Early life ==
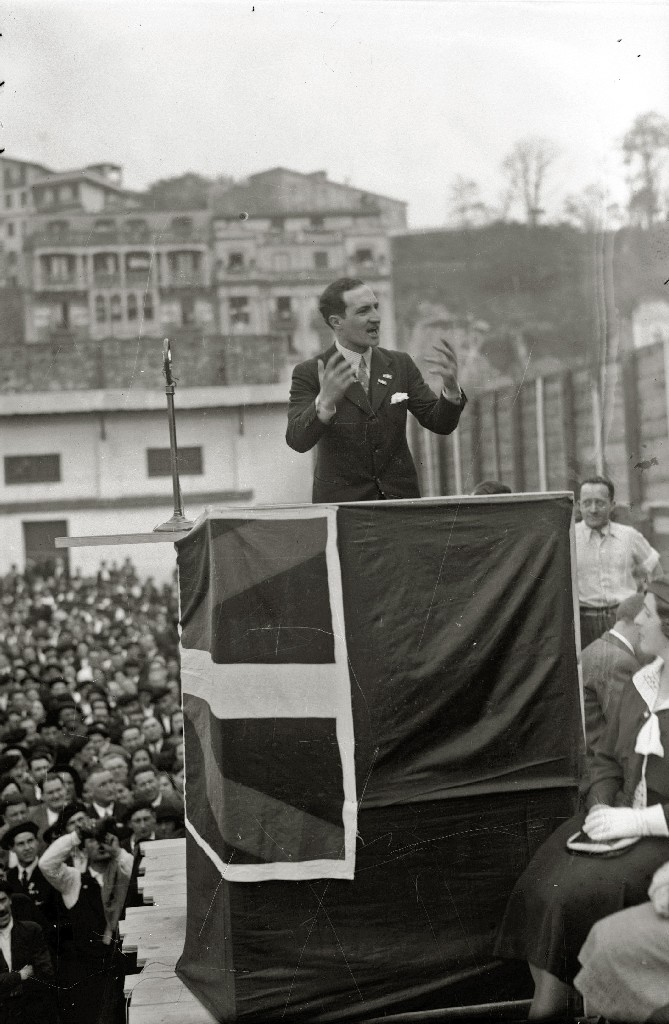
José Antonio Aguirre, 1933

José Antonio Aguirre was born in Bilbao, Biscay, Spain. He studied in the Basque Country's first Ikastola, a school in which all lessons were given in Basque. He later studied law at the University of Deusto.

After his father's death in 1920, Aguirre moved with his family to Algorta, near Bilbao. At 16 years of age, he had to become a father figure to his 10 younger brothers and sisters.

After finishing his law studies, he began working in the family business, Chocolates Aguirre. He later took responsibility for the business and introduced many reforms, including free health care and paid holidays, which significantly improved conditions for the workers in the factory. He also donated part of the business's revenue to the poor and advocated for social housing. Until 1937, Chocolates Bilbaínos S.A. was the second-largest business in its sector in Spain.

Aguirre was a football player for Athletic Bilbao; he won the Copa del Rey with the club in 1923. During the Spanish Civil War, he was one of the main promoters of the Basque Country national football team, which played in Europe and the Americas to raise funds for Basque refugee children whose parents had been forced into exile.

In 1926, after completing his military service, he began work as an attorney at Esteban Bilbao's office. Soon after, he founded his own firm, which focused on political issues and the working conditions of the lower class.

At the time, Spain was ruled by the dictator Miguel Primo de Rivera. Aguirre, a Basque nationalist, joined the Basque Nationalist Party. The party was later divided into two political streams. Aguirre opposed the division, believing that the Basque Country was above any differences. He worked to unify the two factions and succeeded in 1930.

Aguirre increased his involvement in politics and published articles in the newspapers Euzko Gaztedia and Euzkadi. As an example of his integrationist views and new ideals, in 1932, he proposed that the party should accept people who were not born in the Basque Country.

== Early political career ==
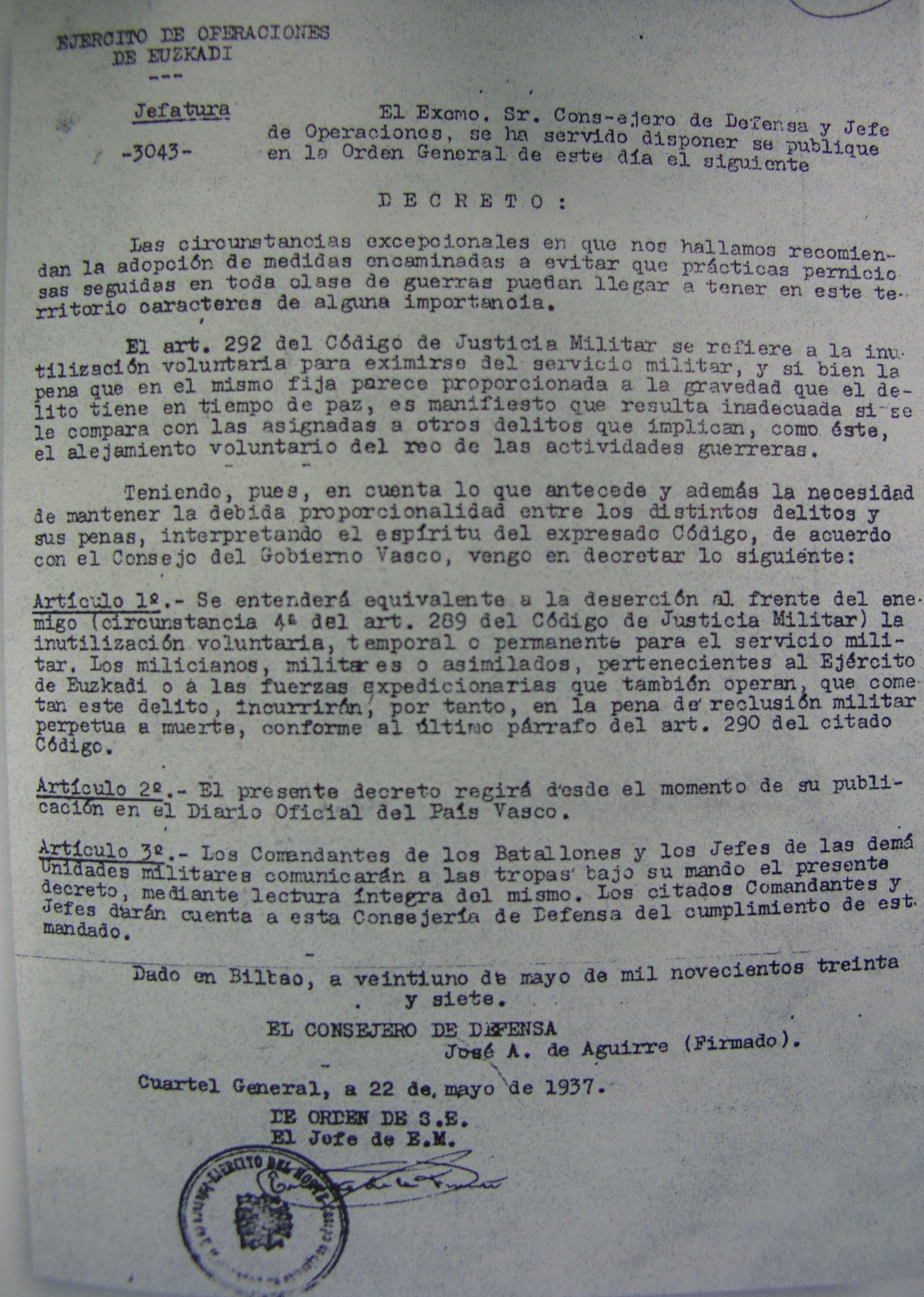
Document signed by Aguirre in 1937

After the dictatorship of Primo de Rivera ended in 1930, a new political era began in Spain. In 1931 and 1932, Aguirre intervened decisively in failed attempts at Basque devolution, which called for self-government, including in Navarre.

On 5 November 1933, two weeks before a general election, a referendum was held in Álava, Gipuzkoa and Biscay on new wording for the Statute of Devolution, which abandoned the inclusion of Navarre. The wording was approved by an overwhelming majority (459,000 votes in favour, 14,000 against), but in Álava, the votes in favour did not reach 50%.

As a result of the dissolution of the legislature for the general election, the hesitation of radical government, and Carlist opposition to the incorporation of Álava in the statutory process, devolution was prevented until 1 October 1936, when the Spanish Civil War started.

== Spanish Civil War ==
On 7 October, the councillors from Biscay, along with some from Gipuzkoa and Araba, participated in passing a ballot. A major uprising had occurred in Araba and Navarre, and most of Gipuzkoa was in the hands of the rebels, who, with the political machinations of the councillors, set the stage for major political change. Agirre was elected Lehendakari (Basque president). After a religious ceremony at the Basilica of Begoña in which he swore allegiance to Catholicism, his country and his party, he visited Gernika and took his oath of office in the Basque language:

Jainkoaren aurrean apalik,

Eusko Lur gainean zutunik,
asaben gomutaz,
Gernikako Zuhaizpean,
herri ordezkarion aintzinean
nere agindua ondo betetzea zin dagit.

English translation:

"Humble in front of God,
Standing in our Basque lands,
Remembering our heritage,
under Gernika's venerable tree,
as president of my country,
I swear to serve my term faithfully."

Oath of Office, 17 September 1936

A government of conciliation was formed by Basque Nationalists, Socialists, Communists, and other Republicans but not without tensions among them. The government was in power in Biscay for several months until the fall of Bilbao.

The first Basque Government was made up of four members of the Basque Nationalist Party (Agirre as Lehendakari and head of defense, Jesús María Leizaola as head of justice and culture, Eliodoro de la Torre as head of finance, and Telesforo Monzón as head of interior); three of the PSOE (Santiago Aznar as head of industry, Juan Gracia Colás as head of welfare, and Juan de los Toyos as head of labor); one of Basque Nationalist Action (Gonzalo Nárdiz as head of agriculture); one of the Republican Left (Ramón María Aldasoro Galarza as head of trade); one of the Republican Union (Alfredo Espinosa as head of health); and one of the Spanish Communist Party (Juan Astigarrabía as head of public works).

The Basque Army (Basque: Eusko Gudarostea), with 100,000 soldiers, was made up of battalions of different ideologies. It was well armed but poorly trained, and one of its most acute deficiencies was the absence of heavy artillery and an air force. Agirre begged Indalecio Prieto and Manuel Azaña to send some aircraft. Historians agree that it was not a viable option because of the difficulties in breaking the Siege of Biscay. However, 40 to 50 airplanes were sent in different shipments, most flying over enemy territory. Others were sent across France and, after being disarmed, were retained or returned to Barcelona or Valencia in accordance with a "no intervention" policy. Another factor that contributed decisively to the Basque Army's defeat was its lack of a qualified general staff.

In June 1937, Franco's Nationalists broke through the Iron Ring of Bilbao and entered the city as a result of the treachery of Alejandro Goikoetxea, the engineer who had designed the fortifications. Agirre moved his government to Trucíos before he headed to Santander and finally to Catalonia, where he prepared to continue fighting with his men. In May, Agirre had entered into talks with the Italians, through intermediaries, about a possible surrender. The talks continued, with the leader of the Basque Nationalist Party, Juan de Ajuriaguerra, discussing terms, the Santoña Agreement, to allow a withdrawal from Bilbao if Nationalist troops did not attack the city. However, they attacked, and Agirre refused to sign the surrender agreement and fought on.

== Exile ==
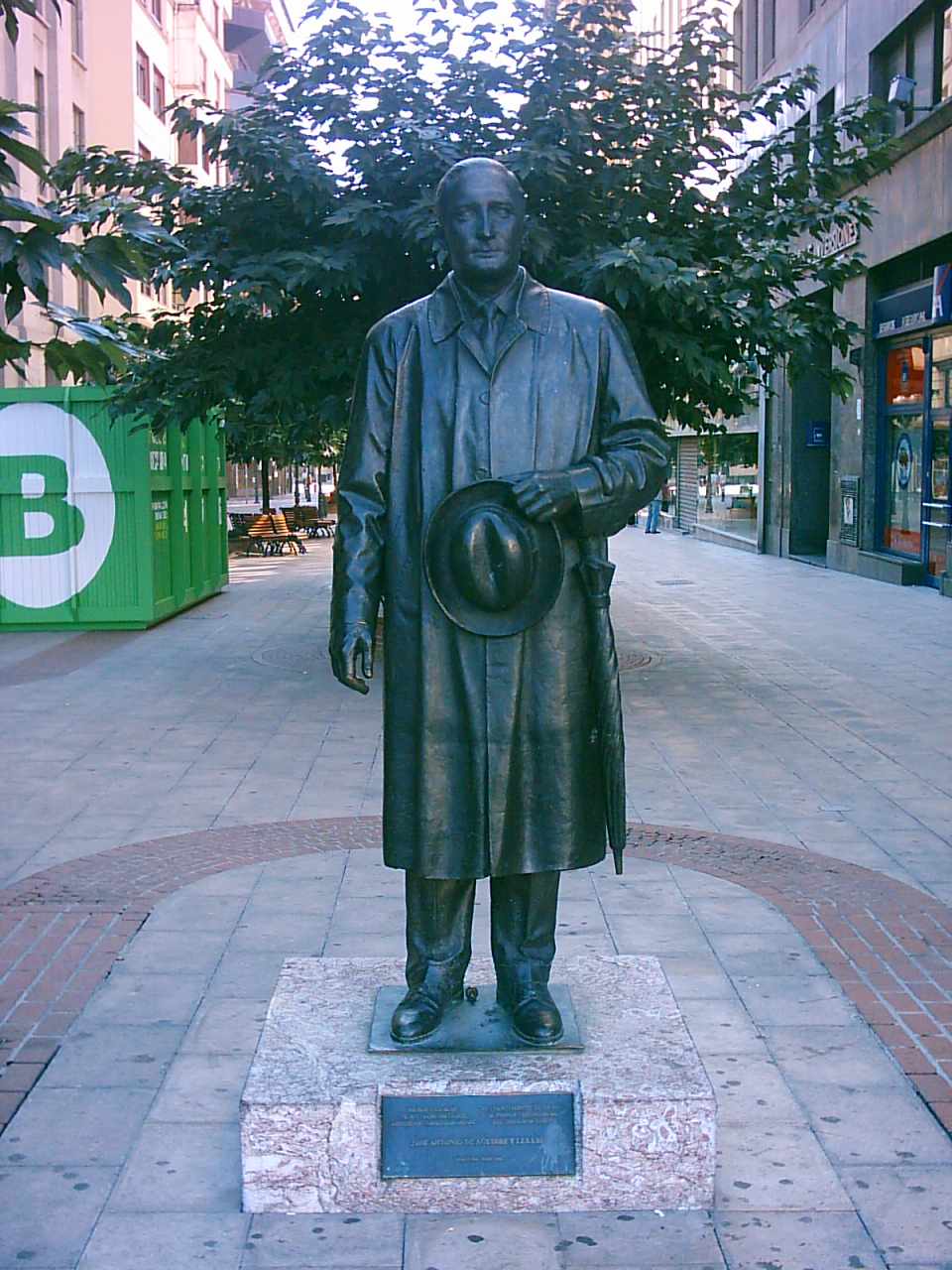
Monument to José Antonio Aguirre in Bilbao

Aguirre fled the country after the war and was pursued for years by agents of Francisco Franco. His exile took him to Paris, Berlin and New York City. In June 1940, the Breton Yann Fouéré gave him documents that allowed him to escape France, which had been invaded by the Wehrmacht.

Aguirre fled first to France, where he organised camps and services for Basque refugees and the government-in-exile. Caught behind enemy lines, he was in Belgium when Hitler occupied that country. He then fled to Berlin, where he lived underground until a false identity was arranged.

Under the protection of a Panamanian ambassador (Germán Guardia, who provided him with a Panamanian passport), Aguirre reached Sweden. Dodging SS German intelligence, he arrived in Rio de Janeiro on the ship Vasaholm on 27 August 1941. The Brazilian customs authorities registered a Panamanian, Dr. José Álvarez Lastra, and a Venezuelan, María de Arrigorriaga, accompanied by their children, José and Gloria. They were actually Aguirre; his wife, María Zabala; and their sons, Aintzane and Joseba. Despite intense efforts made by Manuel de Ynchausti in the United States, Aguirre's true identity was in danger of being discovered within a month.

He wrote then to Ramón María de Aldasoro, the former trade and business secretary of the Basque government, who led the Euzkadi delegation in Buenos Aires, Argentina. However, Aldasoro's efforts on Aguirre's behalf were unsuccessful because the Argentine authorities sympathized with the European "New Order".

Aguirre went to Uruguay and asked a small group of Basque patriots for what Argentina had denied him. The Uruguayan president, General Alfredo Baldomir, agreed, and he even received Aguirre with honours in accordance with his status. Once the arrangements were complete, the public announcement of his arrival was made on 8 October in the newspapers of Montevideo. Aguirre's identity was reinstated, and he was given a visa to travel to New York, where he was put under the protection of resident Basques, who were leading movements in Mexico and New York.

In New York, Aguirre took up a post as a lecturer at Columbia University. After the Pact of Madrid between the US and Spain, he went to France, where the Basque government-in-exile was established. There, he found that France's Vichy government had seized the Basque government building and that President Charles de Gaulle was maintaining it on behalf of Francoist Spain. The building is now the Instituto Cervantes.

The president of the government-in-exile was always a Basque Nationalist Party member, and even the Spanish sole representative in the United Nations was a Basque appointee, Jesús de Galíndez, until his murder in an obscure episode at the time of Spain's entry into the United Nations. Aguirre decided to place the large Basque exiles' network at the service of the Allies, and collaborated with the US Secretary of State and the CIA to defeat their common enemies.

Aguirre died in Paris on 22 March 1960 from a heart attack, aged 56. His body was shipped from Paris to Saint-Jean-de-Luz in the French Basque Country, where it spent a night in the Monzón house and was buried on 28 March after a funeral Mass at the Saint-Jean parish church.

== Influence ==
Aguirre's life was the subject of a Soule folk play, Aguirre presidenta ("President Aguirre"). He wrote a book about his experiences, Escape Via Berlin: Eluding Franco in Hitler's Europe (New York, 1942).

== See also ==
- Tomas Agirre Lekube

== Sources ==
- Arrieta Alberdi, Leyre (2007). "Años de esperanza ante la nueva Europa: la estrategia europeísta del PNV tras la Segunda Guerra Mundial". Ayer (in Spanish) (67, Las relaciones de España con Europa centro-oriental (1939–1975)). Asociacion de Historia Contemporanea and Marcial Pons Ediciones de Historia. JSTOR 41325180.

Political offices
New creation	President of the Basque Country; 1937–1960	Succeeded by Jesús María de Leizaola
