= Ramón Rubial =

Spanish politician

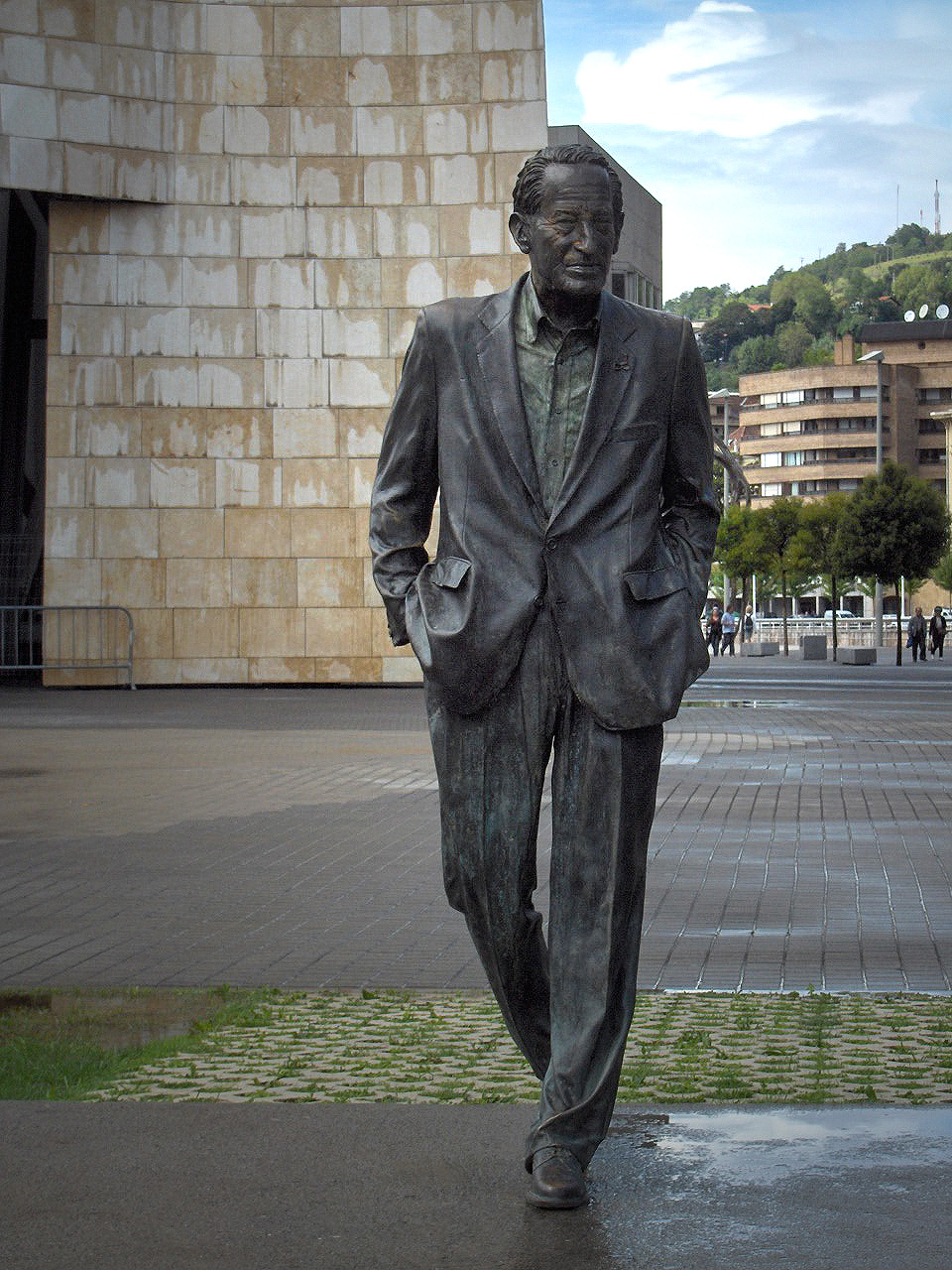
Statue outside the Guggenheim museum in Bilbao

Ramón Rubial Cavia (28 October 1906 – 31 May 1999) was a Spanish socialist leader. He was a main leader of the Spanish Socialist Workers' Party in the Basque Country and in Spain.

== Revolutionary action ==
Born in Erandio, Biscay, Rubial was a metal worker. He joined the Unión General de Trabajadores (UGT) in 1920 and the Spanish Socialist Workers' Party (PSOE) in 1922. In 1934, he was arrested for revolutionary activities during the Asturian miners' strike of 1934, for which he was detained for seven months on a prisoner ship. He was then sentenced to seven years in prison for sedition, but pardoned after the Popular Front victory in the 1936 Spanish general election.

During the Spanish Civil War he defended the Second Spanish Republic, becoming a commissar in the XV Brigade. He was captured in February 1937 and imprisoned in Asturias, before being sentenced in 1940 to fourteen years in jail.

Rubial was released in August 1956, and started to reorganize the PSOE and UGT in the Basque Country and in Spain working underground. President of the PSOE since 1976, he was elected senator for Biscay in the first democratic elections of 1977. He was the Second Vice President of the Spanish Senate.

On 7 February 1978, Rubial was elected President of the General Basque Council, which prepared the Basque Country for the return to autonomous government. He held this position until 1979, when Carlos Garaikoetxea was elected.

== Personal life ==
In 1944 he married Emilia Cachorro, a former civil servant in the agriculture ministry, by special license. They remained married until her death in 1982. Their daughter Lentxu was born in 1944, but he did not meet her until 1956.

Rubial died in Bilbao in 1999 at the age of 92.

| Preceded by Creation of the body | President of the Basque General Council; 1978-1979 | Succeeded by Carlos Garaikoetxea |
| Preceded by — | President of Spanish Socialist Workers' Party (PSOE); 1976-1999 | Succeeded by Manuel Chaves |
