= Deia (newspaper) =

Spanish Basque nationalist newspaper

- Type: Daily newspaper
- Format: Black and white, color
- Owner: Editorial Iparraguirre S.A.
- Founder(s): Mitxel Unzueta, Luzio Aginagalde, Luis María Retolaza and Eli Galdós.
- Editor-in-chief: Iñaki González
- Founded: 8 June 1977
- Political alignment: Basque nationalism, Centrism
- Language: Spanish and Basque
- Headquarters: Bilbao
- Website: deia.com

Deia (in Basque, The call) is a Basque Country-based newspaper incorporated in 1977, with a Basque nationalistic perspective.

The newspaper is bilingual in character though principally written in Spanish with some articles in Basque. Deia is the main product of the Editorial Iparraguirre S.A. (EISA). Although their initial objective was to cover news in the whole of the Basque Country, they actually have as their tag line Noticias de Bizkaia, as their principle market is in Biscay, where they are the second largest newspaper in the city. Deia is part of the newspaper group Grupo Noticias, which includes several other Spanish newspapers including Diario de Noticias in Navarre, Noticias de Gipuzkoa in Gipuzkoa and Noticias de Álava en Alava.

The current director of the newspaper is Iñaki González Torre.

== History ==
Deia, together with other publications by their publishing company, was created by the Basque Nationalist Party with the objective of providing news for moderates in Basque nationalist movement. Among its early the promoters and founders were nationalists like Mitxel Unzueta, Luzio Aginagalde, Luis María Retolaza and Eli Galdós. The first edition was published on 8 June 1977, with Ignacio Iriarte Areso serving as their first director. Their first sub-editors were Alfonso Ventura, Martín Ugalde, and Félix García Olano. Manuel Igarreta and Fernando Múgica served as the first editors-in-chief.

The first edition was published with extraordinary speed, only three months after the founding of their parent organization Editorial Iparraguirre. Founded on 21 March 1977 with an initial capital investment of 40 million pesetas, they started with 25 founding members in their organization. Months later, they increased their initial capital through a series of popular subscription offers and by adding 600 shareholders. Two conditions assisted in the speed of their launch. The first was the first democratic elections in Spain, which were scheduled to be held on 15 June 1977. The second was that two other Basque nationalist societies, "Orain" and "Ardatza", were already working to create left leaning nationalist newspapers. Deia wanted to and did become the first Basque nationalist newspaper published in post-Franco Spain.

Among Deia's founding principles were the highlighting of timely and accurate information as well as focusing on news about individual and collective human rights, promoting solidarity of Basque society, defending Basque tradition, culture, language, politics, social life and family, alongside the promotion of the coexistence of its inhabitants within democratic institutions. Although at an early stage Deia assumed the daily role of unifying of all current opinions that opposed the dictatorship, their lack of definition made the daily newspaper seek a closer identification with the moderate Basque nationalists, represented publicly by the Partido Nacionalista Vasco.

== Bibliography ==
- José María Caminos Marcet, La prensa diaria en el País Vasco, Ed. Orain, 1997. ISBN 84-89077-54-1.
