= Basque Nationalist Party =

Basque Nationalist Party Euzko Alderdi Jeltzalea (Basque) Partido Nacionalista Vasco (Spanish)
- Abbreviation: EAJ; PNV
- President: Aitor Esteban
- Founder: Sabino Arana
- Founded: 1895; 131 years ago
- Headquarters: Sabin Etxea, Ibáñez de Bilbao, 16; Bilbao
- Youth wing: Euzko Gaztedi
- Membership (2021): 21,782
- Ideology: Basque nationalism; Christian democracy; Factions: Conservative liberalism; Social democracy
- Political position: Centre
- National affiliation: CEUS (since 2019) (Note: The party was formerly part of the Europeanist Union (1987–1989), Nationalist Coalition (1989–1994), Nationalist Coalition (1994–1999), Nationalist Coalition–Europe of the Peoples (1999–2004), Galeusca–Peoples of Europe (2004–2009), Coalition for Europe (2009–2014) and Coalition for Europe (2014–2019).); Geroa Bai (since 2011)
- European affiliation: European Democratic Party
- European Parliament group: Renew Europe
- International affiliation: None (Note: The party was formerly part of the Alliance of Democrats.)
- Colors: Red, green, white
- Slogan: Jaungoikoa eta Lagizarra ('God and the Old Law')
- Congress of Deputies (Basque seats): 5 / 18
- Spanish Senate (Basque seats): 5 / 15
- European Parliament: 1 / 61
- Basque Parliament: 27 / 75
- Parliament of Navarre: 2 / 50 Within Geroa Bai
- Juntas Generales: 54 / 153
- Mayors in the Basque Autonomous Community: 121 / 251
- Town councillors in the Basque Autonomous Community: 1,017 / 2,628

Website
- eaj-pnv.eus
- Politics of Spain; Political parties; Elections; A: It has been also positioned as a centre-left or a centre-right party.

The Basque Nationalist Party (Basque: Euzko Alderdi Jeltzalea [eus̺ko aldeɾdi jelts̻ale.a], EAJ; Spanish: Partido Nacionalista Vasco, PNV; French: Parti Nationaliste Basque, PNB), officially the Basque National Party in English, (Note: A proposal to have the official party name changed to "Basque National Party" (Spanish: Partido Nacional Vasco) was rejected by party members in November 2011. Nonetheless, the party did introduce the change in the English version of the name.) and The Basque Party in French (Le Parti Basque), is a Basque nationalist and regionalist political party. The party is located in the centre of the political spectrum. It has been described as Christian democratic, with social democratic and conservative-liberal factions.

The EAJ-PNV was founded by Sabino Arana in 1895, which makes it the second oldest existent political party in Spain, after the Spanish Socialist Workers' Party (PSOE). The EAJ-PNV is the largest Basque nationalist party, having led the Basque Government uninterruptedly since 1979, except for a brief period between 2009 and 2012. In Navarre, it is part of the coalition Geroa Bai, which is currently a junior partner of the PSOE in the Navarrese regional government. In Spain at large, the party has been supporting current Prime Minister Pedro Sánchez, a member of the PSOE, since 2019. Currently a member of the European Democratic Party, EAJ-PNV was previously a member of the European Free Alliance from 1999 to 2004. Earlier it had been affiliated with the European People's Party and the Christian Democrat International (from which it was expelled in 2000).

The party operates in all the territories comprising the Basque Country: the Basque Autonomous Community, Navarre and Treviño in Spain, and in the French Basque Country. It also has delegations in dozens of foreign nations, specifically those with a major presence of Basque immigrants. Its current chairman is Andoni Ortuzar. The party's youth wing is Euzko Gaztedi. The EAJ-PNV's social offices are called batzokis, of which there are over 200 throughout the world. Since 1932, the party celebrates Aberri Eguna (Homeland Day) on Easter. Also, since 1977, it celebrates Alderdi Eguna (Party Day).

== History ==
=== Origins and early history ===
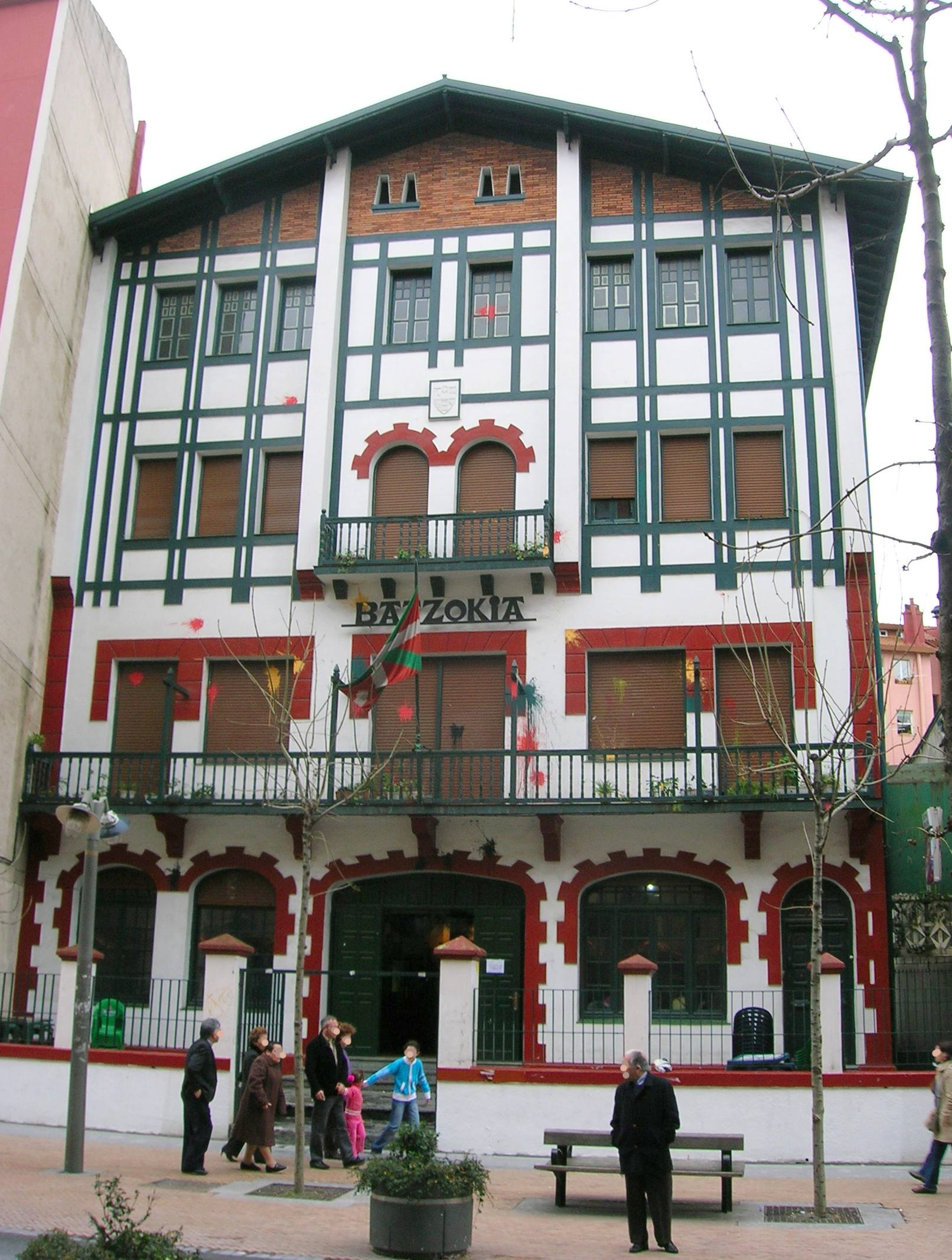
In 1898, the party opened its second batzoki ('meeting place', a club and bar) in Barakaldo.

The Basque Nationalist Party (EAJ-PNV) was founded in 1895 by Sabino de Arana Goiri as a Catholic and conservative political party agitating for political independence for the province of Biscay and the defence of Basque traditional culture, language, and racial purity. In fact, in its early years, party membership was restricted to those who could prove pure Basque ancestry by having eight Basque surnames.

By 1897, the party sought independence not only for Biscay but for all seven provinces comprising the Basque Country in both Spain and France.

In 1916, the Basque Nationalist Party renamed itself the Basque Nationalist Communion (Comunión Nacionalista Vasca). This name change marked a departure, in many aspects, from the original doctrine of the late Sabino Arana and casting itself as a broader social movement rather than simply a political party. The Basque Nationalist Communion at this point advocated for Basque autonomy within Spain, rather than outright independence. However, a small faction known as the "Aberrianos" ("Fatherlanders") within the party remained committed to the cause of independence. In 1921, the leading members of the Aberrianos were kicked from the moderate Basque Nationalist Communion. Later that year, the Aberrianos officially formed their own political party, reclaiming the name "Basque Nationalist Party".

During the single party dictatorship of Captain General Miguel Primo de Rivera (1923-1930), the Basque Nationalist Party was outlawed, and its members went underground. Many of its activities continued through mountaineering ("mendigoxale") and folklore associations. However, the Basque Nationalist Communion was tolerated by the Spanish dictatorship as it was considered a moderate regionalist party.

At the end of 1930, the two nationalist organisations united under the original name Basque Nationalist Party. However, a small faction split from the Basque Nationalist Communion shortly before the reunification, calling itself Eusko Abertzale Ekintza-Acción Nacionalista Vasca ("Basque Nationalist Action"). It was on the moderate nationalist left, non-confessional and open to alliances with Spanish republican and socialist parties.

=== The Second Spanish Republic ===
PNV sticker. Text: "Euzkadi´k bear zaitu" (Euzkadi needs you). It is inspired by Alfred Leete's British poster for Kitchener's Army.

==== 1934–1935 ====
The division between autonomism and independentism appeared again during the Second Spanish Republic. Headed by Aberriano veteran Eli Gallastegi, a small group of independentists coalesced around the Mountaineering Federation of Biscay and its affiliated weekly publication Jagi-Jagi ("Arise Arise"), and abandoned the now-moderate and autonomist Basque Nationalist Party.

=== The Spanish Civil War and Franco's rule ===
==== Civil War ====
After the Spanish Civil War of 18 July 1936, the party felt torn. Certain branches of the party supported the rebellion against the Republic, feeling sympathy for its Catholic and anti-communist agenda. However, the right-wing rebels insisted on a unified Spain, making them hostile to nationalist movements in regions such as the Basque Country. Furthermore, the Basque Nationalist Party was also anti-Fascist, while Fascists constituted a large part of the rebellion. Ultimately, the republican government was able to secure the allegiance of the Basque Nationalist Party with the promise to pass a Basque Autonomy Statute.

The Biscayan and Gipuzkoan branches declared support for the republic, democracy, and anti-fascism in the ensuing Spanish Civil War and were key in balancing those provinces to the Republican side. In the territory seized by the rebels, PNV members faced tough times. During the military uprising in Navarre, the Basque nationalist mayor of Estella-Lizarra, Fortunato Aguirre, was arrested by the Spanish nationalist rebels (18 July 1936), and killed in September. Some Basque nationalists could flee north to Basque areas loyal to the Republic, or France. However, some members of the Alavese and Navarrese committees, ahead of an official decision, published notes refusing support to the Republic. Notwithstanding their initial ambiguous position in certain areas, the party premises and press in Álava and Navarre were closed in that month of July.

Some PNV sympathizers and members joined the Carlist battalions, either out of conviction or to avoid persecution. By October 1936, a war front had been established at the northern tip of Álava and to the west of San Sebastián. Initially, the Defence Committees in Biscay and Gipuzkoa were dominated by the Popular Front. After hard negotiations, eventually Basque autonomy was granted within the Second Spanish Republic in late 1936, and the new autonomous government immediately organized the Basque Army, consisting of militias recruited separately by the various political organizations, including the EAJ-PNV, EAE-ANV, and Jagi-Jagi.

The autonomous government maintained remarkable order behind the lines in Biscay and western Gipuzkoa, and managed the coordination and provision of military resistance. Upon occupation of territories loyal to the Republic, the rebel forces focused repression on leftists, but Basque nationalists were also targeted, facing prison, humiliation, and death in some cases. As the rebel troops approached Biscay, the Carlist press in Pamplona even called for the extermination of Basque nationalists.

José Antonio Aguirre, the party leader, became in October 1936 the first lehendakari (Basque president) of the wartime multipartite Basque Government, ruling the unconquered parts of Biscay and Gipuzkoa. In April 1937, the city of Guernica was bombed by German airplanes covertly aiding the rebel forces. Jose Antonio Aguirre stated that "the German planes bombed us with a brutality that had never been seen before for two and a half hours." Pablo Picasso made a painting in remembrance of the massacre named after the city that year.

When Bilbao, the most populated city in the Basque Country, was taken by Franco's troops, the Basque nationalists decided to not destroy or sabotage the powerful manufacturing industry of Bilbao, thinking that they had the responsibility to secure the prosperity of their people in the future. This decision allowed the occupying rebel forces to use the industrial power of Bilbao in their war effort against the rest of Republic-aligned Spain.

In July 1937, having lost all Basque territory, the Basque Army retreated toward Santander. With no territory or help from the Republic, the Basque Army surrendered to the Italian Corpo Truppe Volontari through the so-called Santoña Agreement. Prison sentences and executions followed, as the rebel government of Francisco Franco ruled that separate terms of surrender could not be made between the Basques and Italians. The Basque government then moved to Barcelona until the fall of Catalonia, and then out of Spain into exile in France. Lehendakari Aguirre was exiled in Belgium when Hitler's forces invaded it, thus beginning his long clandestine journey to reach the United States. With a false identity, he travelled to Berlin, and then on to Sweden with the help of a Panamanian ambassador. He fled Europe for Latin America, where in Uruguay he re-assumed his real identity and was given a visa to the United States. He travelled to New York, where he was taken under the protection of American Basques as a professor at Columbia University.

==== Exile during the post-war ====
The president of the Basque Government in exile was always a EAJ-PNV member. Additionally, the sole Spanish representative in the United Nations was the Basque appointee Jesús de Galíndez, until his murder in an obscure episode regarding his PhD Thesis about Dominican Republic's dictator Trujillo. He also decided to put the large Basque exiles' network at the service of the Allied side and collaborated with the US Secretary of State and the CIA during the Cold War to fight Communism in Spanish America.

When the United States decided to back Franco in 1952, Aguirre went to France where the Basque Government in exile was established. Also, he learned there that the pro-Nazi French government of Vichy confiscated the Basque Government's building and that the anti-Nazi Charles de Gaulle maintained it as a Spanish Government's possession. The building today is the Instituto Cervantes premises where French people can learn any of the Spanish languages, including Basque.

==== Generational conflict and new alliances ====
In 1959, ETA was created by young undergraduates from the area of Bilbao (organisation EKIN) lured by Basque nationalist ideology, but increasingly disgruntled at the ineffective political action of the EAJ-PNV, largely daunted by post-war repression and scattered in exile. In addition, the new generation resented an attempt of the EAJ-PNV to pull the strings of their movement and PNV's youth wing Euzko Gaztedi (EGI), with whom they had merged in the mid-1950s, as well as showing a more modern stance, stressing for one the language as the centre of Basqueness, instead of race.

In the 1950s and 1960s, the party looked for alliances abroad, expecting at first that the defeat of the Axis in World War II would encourage USA's support for an eventual overthrow of Franco's hold on power, which did not happen. In addition, it was a founder party of the Christian Democrat International, but now the party is an active member of the European Democratic Party.

In the late 1960s and early 1970s, contacts started with other Spanish parties to assert the EAJ-PNV's position in a new post-Francoist order. At the same time, the Basque Nationalist Party confirmed its stance against ETA in a period when its violent actions saw a surge and its influence in society was very apparent, especially in street protests. Juan de Ajuriaguerra paved the way for the EAJ-PNV's comeback to Basque politics from exile, and started to negotiate their participation in the new status-quo, with special attention to a new Statute.

=== A Basque Statute ===
The EAJ-PNV's results in the 1977 and 1978 elections confirmed PNV's central position in Basque politics. While the EAJ-PNV advocated for abstention in the referendum on the Spanish Constitution for its lack of Basque input, the party supported the Statute of Autonomy of the Basque Country, approved in December 1978, and paved the way to its success in the first elections held in the Basque Autonomous Community, once Navarre was left out.

In the transition years after Franco's death in 1975, Xabier Arzallus came to prominence, who masterminded the so-called "Spirit of Arriaga" to accommodate the party to the new Spanish democracy. Despite some internal tensions, the former priest and Jesuit came up reinforced and was chosen undisputed party leader. The EAJ-PNV found its main and strongest support base in Biscay, while in Navarre EAJ-PNV was next to non-existent.

Carlos Garaikoetxea spearheaded the new autonomous government after being elected with 38.8% of the votes and during this first term the Basque Nationalist Party held office without outside support. During this period, the EAJ-PNV's challenges were closely associated to its position in the Basque Government: defense of the Statute, devolution of powers from Madrid, discrediting of political violence, restructuring of manufacturing industry steeped in crisis.

As of 1985, tensions inside the party spurred the formation of a splinter group with a stronghold in Gipuzkoa, which in turn led to a new party in 1987, when dissenters from the EAJ-PNV formed the Basque Solidarity ("Eusko Alkartasuna", EA) party. Carlos Garaikoetxea was then elected as the first president of the rival party. The split from the EAJ-PNV was mainly based on:

- A personality clash between the lehendakari Garaikoetxea, who went to form EA, and the EAJ-PNV leader Xabier Arzalluz.
- The configuration of the Basque Country:
  - A strong Basque government and weak provinces (EA).
  - Strong provinces (EAJ-PNV).

Afterwards, some ideological differences also came out. EA adopted a social-democratic ideology, while the EAJ-PNV remained more attached to its Christian-democratic ideas. The split was particularly bitter given that it was headed by the lehendakari (premier) himself. Many EAJ-PNV political bars (batzoki, "meeting place") became alkartetxe ("meeting house").

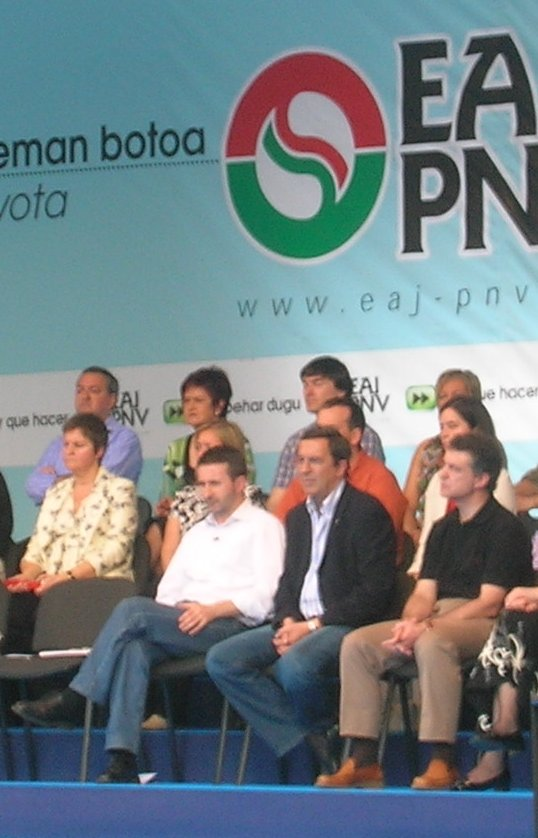
Josu Jon Imaz (in white shirt) and Iñigo Urkullu (in black shirt) in 2007

Since 1991, as time has eased the bitter split (helped by the fact that both Arzalluz and Garaikoetxea have gone into political retirement), both parties agreed to form an electoral coalition in a number of local elections as a means to maximise the nationalist votes, which eventually led to reunite both candidatures in a joint list again for the regional governments of Navarra and the Basque Autonomous Community in 1998. Thus, EA has participated in several EAJ-PNV-led Basque governments, including the 2006 government of President Juan José Ibarretxe Markuartu. Still, EA decided to run by itself in the municipal elections held in May 2007.

Former president Juan José Ibarretxe spearheaded a call for the reform of the Statute of Autonomy that governs the Basque Country Autonomous Community, through a proposal widely known as the Ibarretxe Plan, passed by the Basque Parliament but not even accepted for discussion by the Spanish Cortes Generales.

In 2009, the EAJ-PNV was expelled from office by an alliance of the Socialist Party of the Basque Country and the People's Party, taking advantage of a distorted parliament representation issued from the outlawing of left-wing Basque nationalists. Until that moment, the EAJ-PNV dominated every administration of the Basque government. In Navarre, the EA and EAJ-PNV formed the coalition Nafarroa Bai—'Yes to Navarre'—along with Aralar and Batzarre, but a split within the coalition led to its revamp as Geroa Bai. In terms of ideology, by November 2016 the Basque Nationalist Party shifted its rhetoric to make the autonomous community of Euskadi the subject of the Basque nation.

=== Position in recent referendums ===
The EAJ-PNV called for:

- Abstention in the Referendum for Spanish Constitution in 1978.
- Gave freedom to vote yes or no to permanence of Spain in the NATO in 1986. The Yes won the vote in Spain, but the No was the first choice among the electors of the Basque Country.
- Yes to the European Constitution proposal in the referendum held in Spain on 21 February 2005; and supported the Lisbon Treaty in the Spanish Cortes Generales.

== Ideology ==
The EAJ-PNV has ideologically evolved over time. The party has struggled with internal infighting between moderate pragmatic and radical separatist factions for much of its history. The party currently defines itself as a "basque, democratic, participative, plural, secular and humanist" party.

During its early years under the command of Sabino Arana, the party's ideology was based on a Basque nationalism fundamentally characterised by an essentialist conception of the Basque nation, Catholic integrism, notions of racial purity and opposition to liberalism, socialism and industrialization. The party initially sought independence only for the province of Biscay, but it started calling for the independence of all seven Basque provinces in Spain and France soon after. The party's ideological evolution under Arana has been divided into three stages: a radical nationalist one from 1893 to 1898; a more moderate and pragmatic phase from 1898 to 1902; and a pro-Spanish shift that ended in 1903 with Arana's death.

== Organization ==
=== Logos ===
1977

1992

=== Leadership ===
==== Party Presidents ====
The National Council of the Basque Nationalist Party (Euzkadi-Buru-Batzar) was created in 1911. Therefore, Sabino Arana and Ángel Zabala were only presidents of the Regional Council of Biscay (Bizkai-Buru-Batzar).

President		Time in office
1.	Sabino Arana	1895 – 1903
2.	Ángel Zabala Ozamiz	1903 – 1906
3.	Santiago Alda, Alipio Larrauri, Antonio Arroyo, Vicente Larrinaga and Eduardo Arriaga (Deputation)	1906 – 1908
4.	Luis de Arana y Goiri	1908 – 1915
5.	Ramón Bikuña	1915 – 1917
6.	Gorgonio de Rentería	1917 – 1920
7.	Ignacio Rotaeche (Comunión Nacionalista Vasca)	1920 – 1930
–	Juan de Eguileor (Aberri)	1921 – 1923
–	Alipio Larrauri (Aberri)	1923 – 1928
–	Ceferino de Jemein (Aberri)	1928 – 1930
8.	Ramón Bikuña	1930 – 1932
9.	Luis de Arana y Goiri	1932 – 1933
10.	Jesús Doxandabaratz	1933 – 1934
11.	Isaac López Mendizábal	1934 – 1935
12.	Doroteo Ciáurriz	1935 – 1951
13.	Juan Ajuriaguerra	1951 – 1957
14.	Jose Agerre	1957 – 1962
15.	Joseba Rezola, Jesús Solaun and Ignacio Unceta	1962 – 1971
16.	Mikel Isasi	1971 – 1975
17.	Ignacio Unceta	1975 – 1977
18.	Carlos Garaikoetxea	1977 – 1980
19.	Xabier Arzalluz	1980 – 1984
20.	Román Sudupe	1984 – 1985
21.	Jesús Insausti	1985 – 1987
22.	Xabier Arzalluz	1987 – 2004
23.	Josu Jon Imaz	2004 – 2008
24.	Iñigo Urkullu	2008 – 2013
25.	Andoni Ortuzar	2013 – 2025
26.	Aitor Esteban	2025 – present

=== Party traditions ===
==== Jeltzaletasuna ====
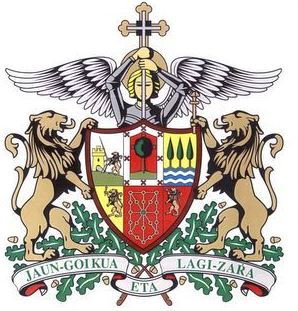
A coat of arms for the Basque Country with the motto

JeL (Jaun-Goikua eta Lagi-zaŕa, "God and the Old Laws" in Arana's purist Biscayan Basque, Jaungoikoa eta Lege-zaharra or Jaungoikoa eta Foruak in Standard Basque) is the motto of the party.

The "old laws" referred to are the fueros, the traditional laws of the Basque provinces, observed by the kings of Castile, and later Spain, until the Carlist Wars. The motto of Basque Carlists was Dios, patria, fueros, rey ("God, Country, Fueros, King"). Basque nationalism evolved out of Carlism, eventually supplanting it in much of the Basque Country.

Jeltzale in the party's Basque-language name Euzko Alderdi Jeltzalea is a word comprising two parts: JeL (the acronym for "God and the Old Laws") and -(t)zale (literally meaning "fond of"). Thus jeltzale could be rendered in English as "one who is fond of God and the Old Laws (JeL)", or translated simply as "nationalist".

A jelkide (after -kide, "companion") is a member of the party.

==== Alderdi Eguna ====
Alderdi Eguna ("Party Day") is the national holiday of the Basque Nationalist Party which is annually celebrated on the last Sunday of September, the Sunday closest to the feast day of Saint Michael, the patron saint of Euskal Herria and of the Basque Nationalist Party.

The central act of this celebration is a political meeting of leading nationalists, but the celebration begins in the morning with a traditional festival in which the different municipal organizations from the party set up stands to sell drinks and their more typical products, all brightened up by traditional music. Dances and traditional sports are also enjoyed. The celebration takes place in an open air arena (currently in Foronda, Álava), and lasts until nightfall.

=== International affiliation ===
In the European Parliament, the Basque Nationalist Party sits in the Renew Europe group with one MEP. The EAJ-PNV is also a member of the European Democratic Party (EDP). The party was previously a founding member of the European People's Party and the Christian Democrat International, from which it was expelled in 2000. The EAJ-PNV was also a member of the European Free Alliance from 1999 to 2004.

In the European Committee of the Regions, the Basque Nationalist Party sits in the Renew Europe CoR group with one full and one alternate member for the 2025-2030 mandate.

== Electoral performance ==
=== Regional parliaments ===
==== Basque Parliament ====
Basque Parliament
Election	Leading candidate	Votes	%	Seats	Gov.
1980	Carlos Garaikoetxea	349,102	38.0 (#1)	25 / 60	Yes
1984	Carlos Garaikoetxea	451,178	41.8 (#1)	32 / 75	Yes
1986	José Antonio Ardanza	271,208	23.6 (#1)	17 / 75	Yes
1990	José Antonio Ardanza	289,701	28.3 (#1)	22 / 75	Yes
1994	José Antonio Ardanza	304,346	29.3 (#1)	22 / 75	Yes
1998	Juan José Ibarretxe	350,322	27.6 (#1)	21 / 75	Yes
2001	Juan José Ibarretxe	Within PNV–EA		26 / 75	Yes
2005	Juan José Ibarretxe	Within PNV–EA		21 / 75	Yes
2009	Juan José Ibarretxe	399,600	38.1 (#1)	30 / 75	No
2012	Iñigo Urkullu	384,766	34.2 (#1)	27 / 75	Yes
2016	Iñigo Urkullu	398,168	37.4 (#1)	28 / 75	Yes
2020	Iñigo Urkullu	349,960	38.7 (#1)	31 / 75	Yes
2024	Imanol Pradales	372,456	34.8 (#1)	27 / 75	Yes

==== Parliament of Navarre ====
Parliament of Navarre
Election	Leading candidate	Votes	%	Seats	+/–	Government
1979	Manuel de Irujo	Within NV		3 / 70	3	Opposition
1983	Iñaki Cabasés	18,161	6.83 (#5)	3 / 50	0	Opposition
1987	Vicente Arocena	2,661	0.94 (#11)	0 / 50	3	Extra-parliamentary
1991	José Antonio Urbiola	3,071	1.12 (#10)	0 / 50	0	Extra-parliamentary
1995	José Antonio Urbiola	2,943	0.99 (#8)	0 / 50	0	Extra-parliamentary
1999	Begoña Errazti	Within EA–PNV		1 / 50	1	Opposition
2003	Begoña Errazti	Within EA–PNV		1 / 50	0	Opposition
2007	Patxi Zabaleta	Within NaBai		1 / 50	0	Opposition
2011	Patxi Zabaleta	Within NaBai 2011		1 / 50	0	Opposition
2015	Uxue Barkos	Within GBai		4 / 50	1	Coalition
2019	Uxue Barkos	Within GBai		3 / 50	1	Coalition
2023	Uxue Barkos	Within GBai		3 / 50	0	Coalition

=== Restoration Cortes ===
Restoration Cortes
Election	Leading candidate	Congress	Senate	Status in legislature
1918	Manuel Aranzadi	7 / 409	2 / 180	Opposition
1919	Manuel Aranzadi	5 / 409	2 / 180	Opposition
1920	Manuel Aranzadi	1 / 409	0 / 180	Opposition
1923	Manuel Aranzadi	1 / 409	0 / 180	Opposition

=== Cortes Generales ===
==== Nationwide ====
Cortes Generales
Election	Leading candidate	Congress					Senate		Status in legislature
Election	Leading candidate	Votes	%	#	Seats	+/–	Seats	+/–	Status in legislature
1931	José Antonio Aguirre	—	1.50%	12th	7 / 473	New	—	—	Opposition
1933	José Antonio Aguirre	183,000	2.14%	8th	11 / 473	4	—	—	Opposition
1936	José Antonio Aguirre	150,100	1.59%	10th	9 / 473	2	—	—	Opposition (1936)
1936	José Antonio Aguirre	150,100	1.59%	10th	9 / 473	2	—	—	Coalition (1936–1939)
Francoist dictatorship
1977	Juan de Ajuriaguerra	296,193	1.62%	8th	8 / 350	—	6 / 207	—	Opposition
1979	Xabier Arzalluz	296,597	1.65%	8th	7 / 350	1	8 / 208	2	Opposition
1982	Iñigo Agirre	395,656	1.88%	7th	8 / 350	1	7 / 208	1	Opposition
1986	Iñaki Anasagasti	309,610	1.53%	6th	6 / 350	2	7 / 208	0	Opposition
1989	Iñaki Anasagasti	254,681	1.24%	6th	5 / 350	1	4 / 208	3	Opposition
1993	Iñaki Anasagasti	291,448	1.24%	6th	5 / 350	0	3 / 208	1	Confidence and supply
1996	Iñaki Anasagasti	318,951	1.27%	5th	5 / 350	0	4 / 208	1	Confidence and supply
1996	Iñaki Anasagasti	318,951	1.27%	5th	5 / 350	0	4 / 208	1	Opposition (from Jun. 1998)
2000	Iñaki Anasagasti	353,953	1.53%	5th	7 / 350	2	6 / 208	2	Opposition
2004	Josu Erkoreka	420,980	1.63%	6th	7 / 350	0	6 / 208	0	Opposition
2008	Josu Erkoreka	306,128	1.19%	5th	6 / 350	1	2 / 208	4	Opposition
2011	Josu Erkoreka	324,317	1.33%	7th	5 / 350	1	4 / 208	2	Opposition
2015	Aitor Esteban	302,316	1.20%	8th	6 / 350	1	6 / 208	2	New election
2016	Aitor Esteban	287,014	1.19%	7th	5 / 350	1	5 / 208	1	Opposition
2016	Aitor Esteban	287,014	1.19%	7th	5 / 350	1	5 / 208	1	Confidence and supply (from Jun. 2018)
2019 (Apr)	Aitor Esteban	395,884	1.51%	8th	6 / 350	1	9 / 208	4	New election
2019 (Nov)	Aitor Esteban	379,002	1.56%	9th	6 / 350	0	9 / 208	0	Confidence and supply
2023	Aitor Esteban	277,289	1.12%	8th	5 / 350	1	4 / 208	5	Confidence and supply

==== Regional breakdown ====
Election	Basque Country						
Election	Congress					Senate	
Election	Votes	%	#	Seats	+/–	Seats	+/–
1977	296,193	29.28%	1st	8 / 21	—	6 / 12	—
1979	275,292	27.57%	1st	7 / 21	1	8 / 12	2
1982	379,293	31.73%	1st	8 / 21	1	7 / 12	1
1986	304,675	27.82%	1st	6 / 21	2	7 / 12	0
1989	252,119	22.78%	1st	5 / 21	1	4 / 12	3
1993	287,908	24.05%	2nd	5 / 19	0	3 / 12	1
1996	315,793	25.04%	1st	5 / 19	0	4 / 12	1
2000	347,417	30.38%	1st	7 / 19	2	6 / 12	2
2004	420,980	33.72%	1st	7 / 19	0	6 / 12	0
2008	306,128	27.11%	2nd	6 / 18	1	2 / 12	4
2011	324,317	27.41%	1st	5 / 18	1	4 / 12	2
2015	302,316	24.72%	2nd	6 / 18	1	6 / 12	2
2016	287,014	24.86%	2nd	5 / 18	1	5 / 12	1
2019 (Apr)	395,884	31.01%	1st	6 / 18	1	9 / 12	4
2019 (Nov)	379,002	32.01%	1st	6 / 18	0	9 / 12	0
2023	277,289	24.0%	2nd	5 / 18	1	4 / 12	5

Election	Navarre						
Election	Congress					Senate	
Election	Votes	%	#	Seats	+/–	Seats	+/–
1977	Within FA			0 / 5	—	0 / 4	—
1979	21,305	8.42%	5th	0 / 5	0	0 / 4	0
1982	16,363	5.49%	5th	0 / 5	0	0 / 4	0
1986	4,935	1.81%	7th	0 / 5	0	0 / 4	0
1989	2,562	0.92%	8th	0 / 5	0	0 / 4	0
1993	3,540	1.14%	8th	0 / 5	0	0 / 4	0
1996	3,158	0.97%	7th	0 / 5	0	0 / 4	0
2000	6,536	2.16%	6th	0 / 5	0	0 / 4	0
2004	Within NaBai			0 / 5	0	0 / 4	0
2008	Within NaBai			0 / 5	0	0 / 4	0
2011	Within GBai			0 / 5	0	0 / 4	0
2015	Within Cambio-Aldaketa			0 / 5	0	0 / 4	0
2016	Within GBai			0 / 5	0	0 / 4	0
2019 (Apr)	Within Cambio-Aldaketa			0 / 5	0	0 / 4	0
2019 (Nov)	Within GBai			0 / 5	0	0 / 4	0
2023	Within GBai			0 / 5	0	0 / 4	0

=== European Parliament ===
European Parliament
Election	Total					Basque Country			Navarre			EP Group
Election	Votes	%	#	Seats	+/–	Votes	%	#	Votes	%	#	EP Group
1987	Within UE			0 / 60	—	208,135	19.39%	2nd	2,574	0.91%	9th	–
1989	Within CN			1 / 60	1	201,809	20.95%	1st	2,410	1.05%	10th	NI
1994	Within CN			1 / 64	0	233,626	25.85%	1st	2,835	1.23%	6th	EPP
1999	Within CN–EP			1 / 64	0	Within PNV–EA			Within EA–PNV			Greens/EFA
2004	Within Galeusca			1 / 54	0	249,143	35.28%	1st	4,188	2.10%	6th	ALDE
2009	Within CEU			1 / 54	0	208,432	28.54%	1st	3,691	1.82%	7th	ALDE
2014	Within CEU			1 / 54	0	208,987	27.48%	1st	5,552	2.54%	7th	ALDE
2019	Within CEUS			1 / 59	0	380,577	33.92%	1st	Within GBai			RE
2024	Within CEUS			1 / 61	0	196,152	22.44%	3rd	Within GBai			RE

== See also ==
- Basque Republic
- Euskadi
- History of the Basques (Late Modern Period)
- Luis María Bandrés

== Bibliography ==
- Slomp, Hans (26 September 2011). Europe, A Political Profile: An American Companion to European Politics [2 volumes]: An American Companion to European Politics. Santa Barbara: ABC-CLIO. ISBN 978-0-313-39182-8.
- Gibbons, John (1999). Spanish Politics Today. Manchester University Press. 174. ISBN 978-0-7190-4946-0.
- Hepburn, Eve (2013). New Challenges for Stateless Nationalist and Regionalist Parties. Routledge. 186. ISBN 978-1-317-96596-1.
- Anttiroiko, Ari-Veikko; Mälkiä, Matti (2007). Encyclopedia of Digital Government. Idea Group Inc (IGI). 1916. ISBN 978-1-59140-790-4.
- Verney, Susannah (2013). Euroscepticism in Southern Europe: A Diachronic Perspective. Routledge. 224. ISBN 978-1-317-99611-8.
- Ştefuriuc, Irina (2013). Government Formation in Multi-Level Settings: Party Strategy and Institutional Constraints. Palgrave Macmillan. 200. ISBN 978-1-137-30074-4.
- Cabestan, Jean-Pierre; Pavković, Aleksandar (2013). Secessionism and Separatism in Europe and Asia: To Have a State of One's Own. Routledge. 246. ISBN 978-0-415-66774-6.
- López Basaguren, Alberto; Escajedo San Epifanio, Leire (2013). The Ways of Federalism in Western Countries and the Horizons of Territorial Autonomy in Spain: Volume 2. Springer Science & Business Media. 924. ISBN 978-3-642-27717-7.
- Chislett, William (2013). Spain: What Everyone Needs to KnowRG. Oxford University Press. 256. ISBN 978-0-19-993645-8.
