= Aberri Eguna =

Celebration day in Bilbao

- Date: Easter Sunday
- 2025 date: 20 April
- 2026 date: 5 April
- 2027 date: 28 March
- 2028 date: 16 April
- Frequency: annual

Aberri Eguna ("Fatherland Day") is a celebration day and set of meetings coinciding with Easter Sunday organized mainly by the Basque nationalist movement. It was first organised by the Basque Nationalist Party on 27 March 1932 in Bilbao, then consisting of a demonstration of some 65,000 participants which terminated at the Sabino Arana House. It has since become the unofficial Basque national holiday.

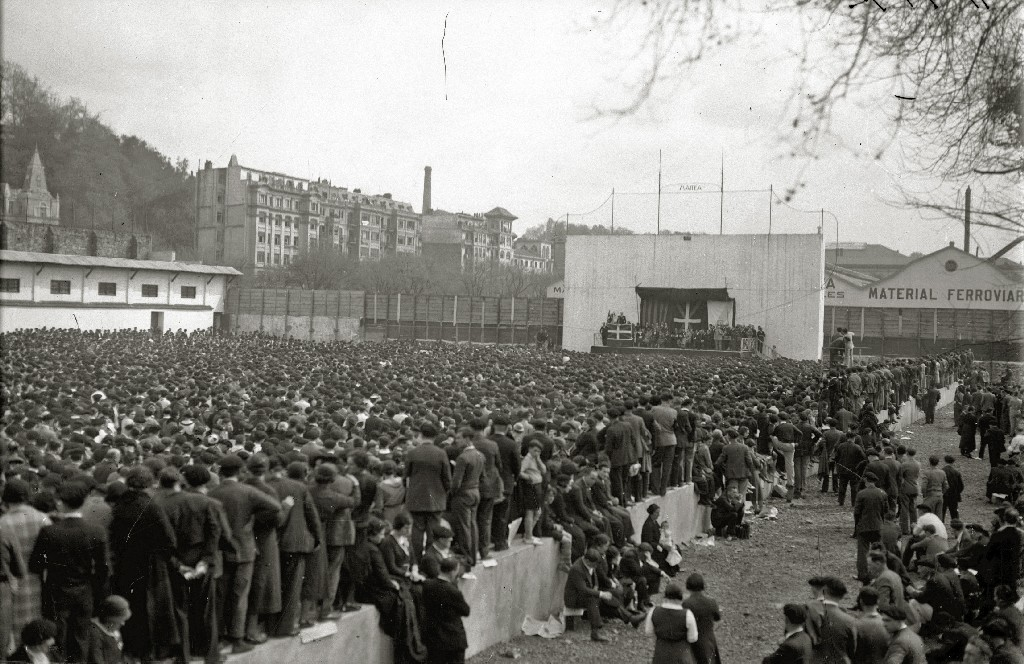
1933 Fatherland Day in San Sebastián (Gipuzkoa)

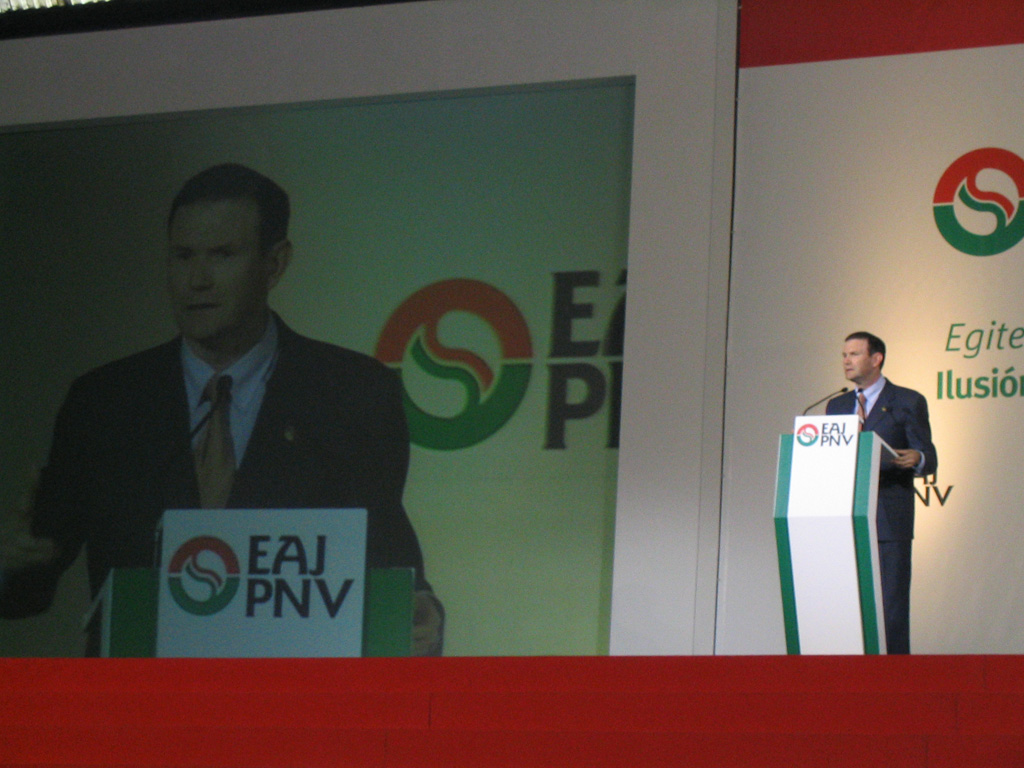
Political speeches on Aberri Eguna

== Etymology ==
Aberri is a neologism coined by Sabino Arana based on the suffix -ba which occurs in numerous kinship terms (e.g. osaba "uncle", izeba "aunt", arreba "sister of a man" etc.) from which he fancifully deduced a putative root *aba "father". He formed numerous neologisms based on this putative word such as aberri (*aba + herri "land, people, country, settlement"), abizen "surname" (*aba + izen "name") or abenda "race" (*aba + enda "lineage"). From aberri he then went on to coin abertzale "patriot" (aberri "fatherland" + -(t)zale, a suffix denoting someone keen on something). In spite of their fanciful derivation, aberri and abertzale have found their way into general usage.

== History ==
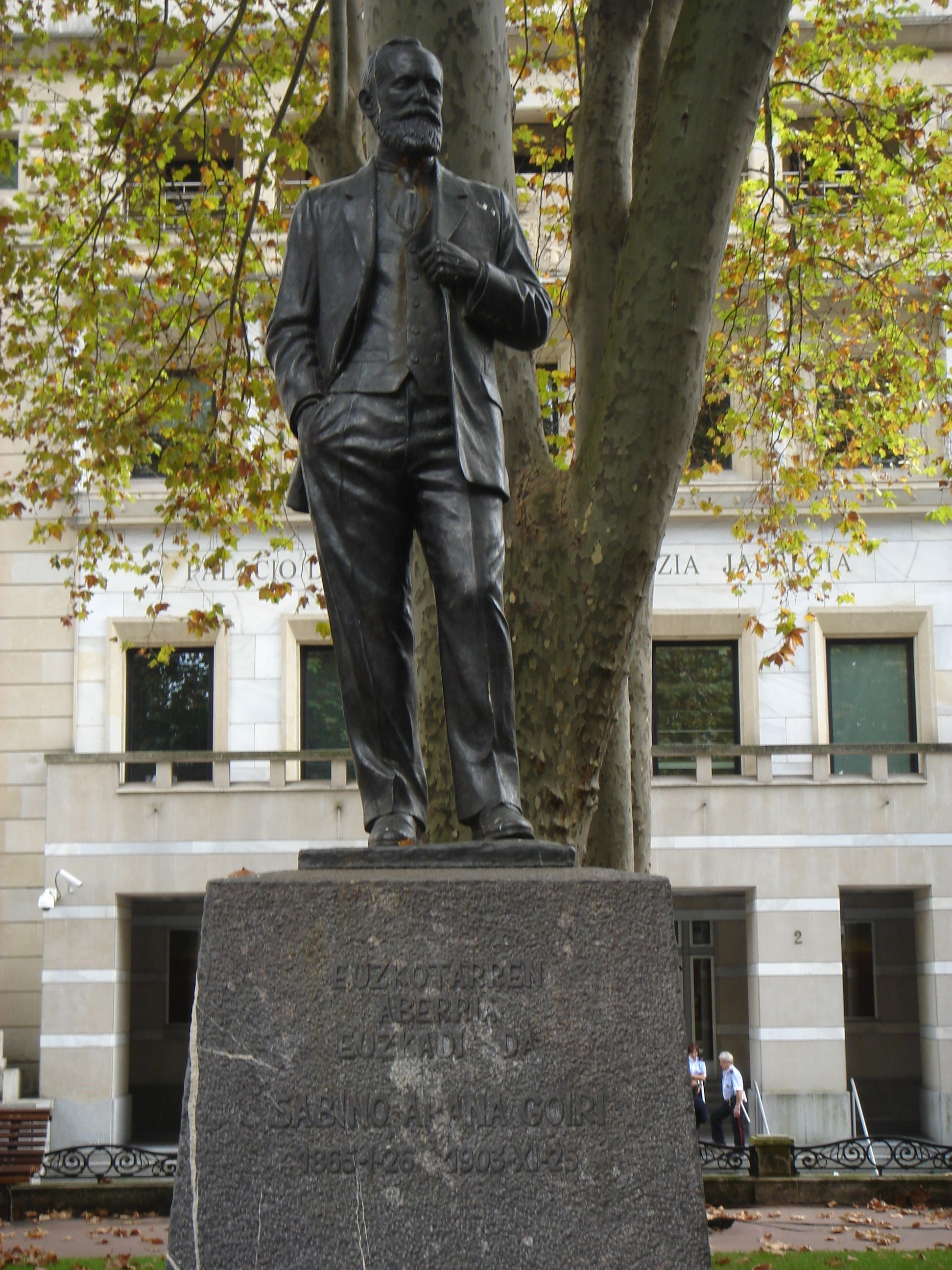
Sabino Arana

The first Aberri Eguna was held to celebrate the anniversary of the concept of political Basque nationalism as put forward by Sabino Arana in 1882, according to his own writings. Some claims suggest that the date was established after Arana's death. However, its coinciding with Easter is deliberate as it follows the motto of the Basque Nationalist Party Jaungoiko eta Lege Zaharrak "God and the Old Laws" and the symbolism of the resurrection of Christ. Ideologically, it follows the examples of the older Catalan and Galician patriotic holidays, the National Day of Catalonia (from 1889 onwards) and the National Day of Galicia (from 1919 onwards). It was then celebrated in San Sebastián in 1933, in Vitoria-Gasteiz in 1934 and in Pamplona in 1935.

From 1936 onwards, the year of the outbreak of the Spanish Civil War, it was no longer celebrated in a single location but instead in various localities on a smaller scale and under clandestine conditions as, under Franco, Aberri Eguna was forbidden from 1937 to 1975. It was only freely celebrated in the Northern Basque Country (in France) under the auspices of the Basque Government in Exile.

== Current status ==
The Aberri Eguna is not an official holiday and main events continue to be organized by Basque nationalist parties. However, the exact format and tone depends on the organiser and thus can vary considerably from a political rally to a cultural picnic. In particular in emigrant communities, the celebration of Basque culture features much more strongly than any political overtones. The cultural element often features events such as Basque music, traditional sports, food and drink, in particular Basque cider.

== See also ==
- Basque nationalism
- Sabino Arana
