= Faculty of Law, University of the Basque Country =

Law School of the University of the Basque Country

- Facultad de Derecho - Zuzenbide Fakultatea
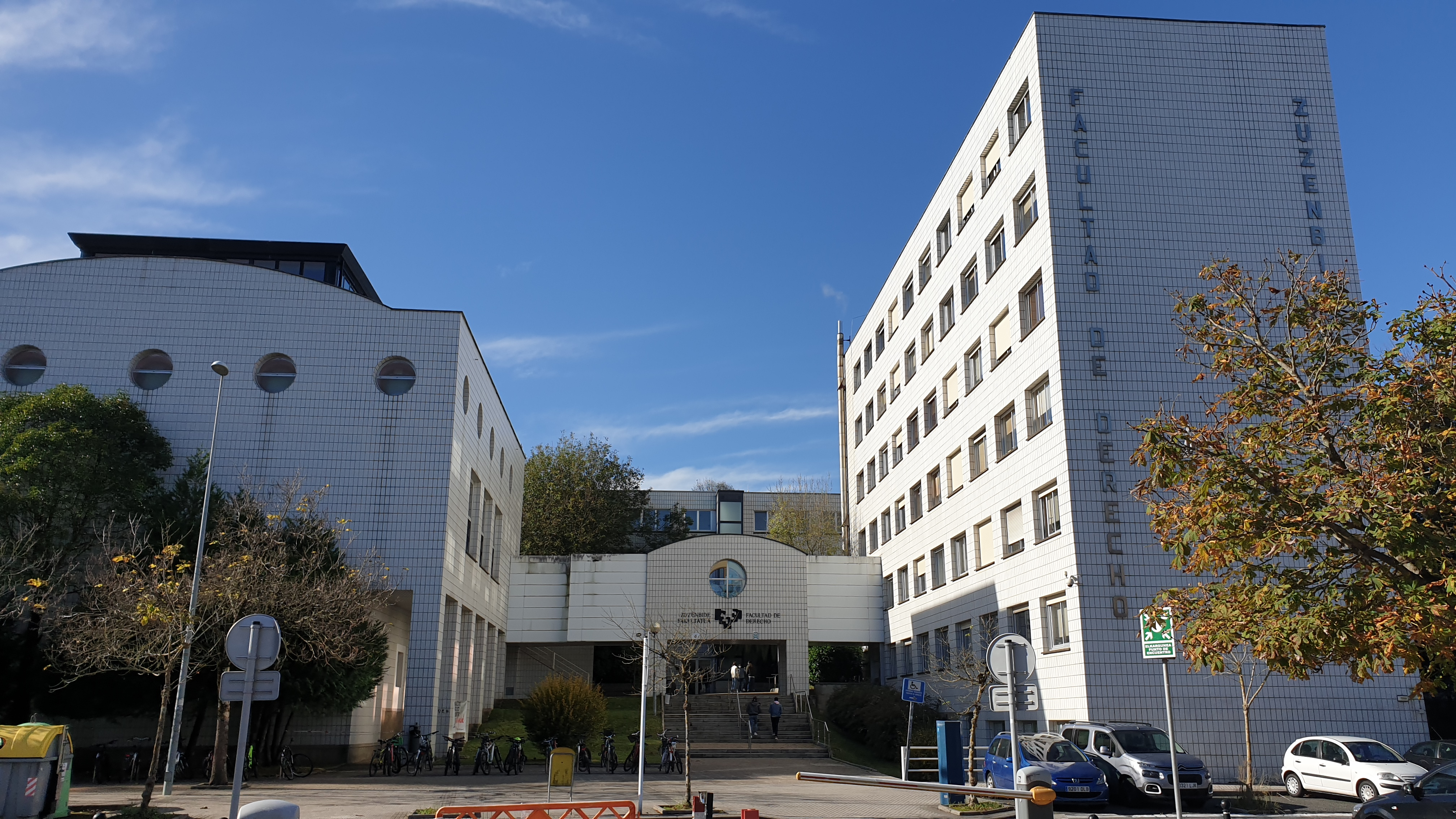
- Faculty of Law of the UPV/EHU (Gipuzkoa division)
- Type: Faculty
- Established: 1969; 57 years ago
- Parent institution: University of the Basque Country
- Dean: Alberto Emparanza Sobejano
- Students: 2,000
- Location: Pª Manuel de Lardizabal, 2 (San Sebastián); Bº Sarriena, s/n (Leioa), Basque Country; Spain
- Website: zuzenbide.ehu.eus
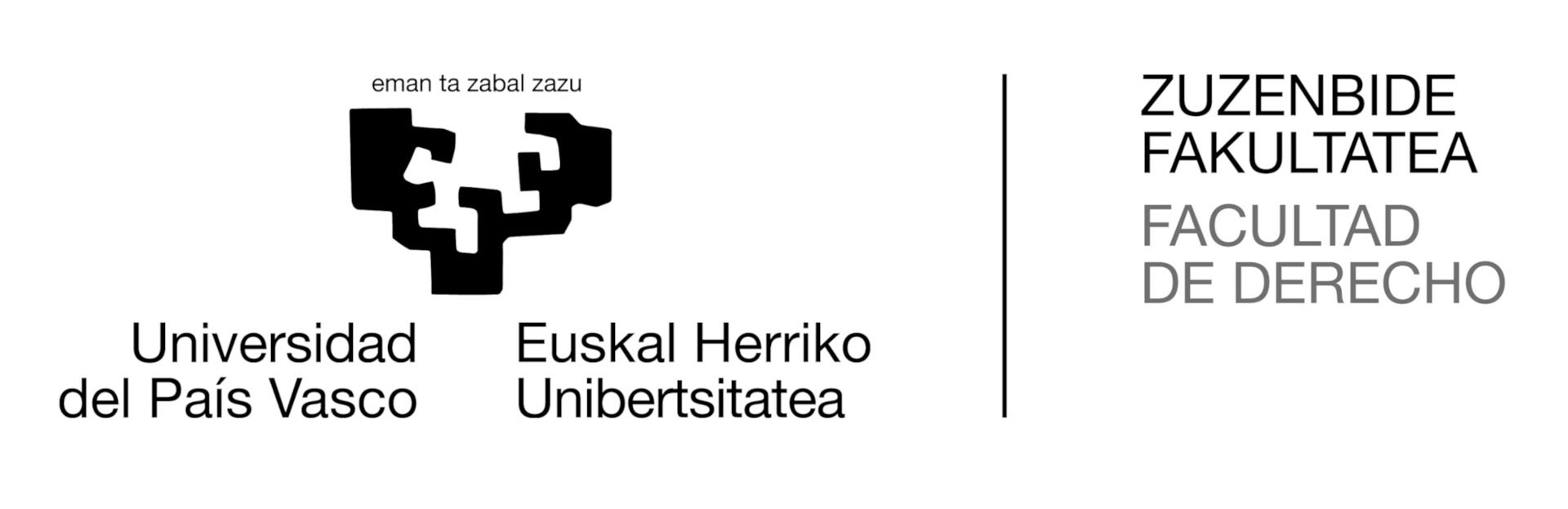

The Faculty of Law, University of the Basque Country (Spanish: Facultad de Derecho, Basque: Zuzenbide Fakultatea) is the Law School (faculty) of the University of the Basque Country.

The main building of the Faculty of Law is located in San Sebastian (Gipuzkoa), on the Gipuzkoa Campus of the University of the Basque Country. Since 1997, the faculty has also a building in Leioa (Biscay), on the Bizkaia Campus (Biscay division).

The Faculty (both the Gipuzkoa and the Biscay divisions) has more than 2,000 students including LLB, LLM, and PhD students.

The Faculty of Law of the UPV/EHU has been the alma mater of a President of the Basque Government, a minister of the Government of Spain and several Ministers of the Basque Government, as well as several deputies, senators, parliamentarians and other politicians.

The current dean of the Faculty of Law is Professor Alberto Emparanza Sobejano, full professor of commercial law.

== History ==
=== Origins ===
The university teaching of Law in the present-day Basque Country has its most distant antecedent in the ancient University of Oñate. This university was founded by the bishop and humanist from Oñati, Rodrigo Sánchez de Mercado de Zuazola, in 1540 under the name of the University of Sancti Spiritus and by means of a papal bull of Pope Paul III.

The university taught university studies in Law and Legislation, and also in Theology and Legislation, especially in ius commune and Corpus iuris civilis, which was expanding throughout Europe at that time. The university was strictly Catholic until 1869, after the Revolution of 1868, when it housed the Free University, and then passed into the hands of the Carlists, who founded the Royal and Pontifical Basque-Navarre University. At the end of the century it became the Catholic Free University, but the institution closed its doors in 1901.

=== The Faculty of Law of the UPV/EHU (1969) ===
In the 20th century, Decree Law 5/1968, of June 6, on urgent measures for university restructuring, attempted to respond to the difficulties posed by the educational demands of growing urban populations, and created several university structures.

Thus, the first article of Decree Law 5/1968 created a University Faculty in San Sebastián. Later, in the Decree of July 27, 1968, it was established as the Faculty of Law, attached to the District of Valladolid, despite the existence of other preferred options, expressed by the representatives of Gipuzkoa.

Thus, the Faculty of Law of the UPV/EHU was founded in 1969 in San Sebastián, Gipuzkoa, when the creation of university centers in the Basque Country began to be authorized, after long decades of prohibition. The official inauguration took place on 17 September 1971.

Ten years later, in 1979, they were grouped together under the name of the University of the Basque Country. Finally, on 25 February 1980, the University of Bilbao became the University of the Basque Country (UPV/EHU).

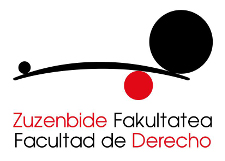
Faculty of Law logo

=== The Faculty of Law (Biscay division) (1997) ===
In October 1997, the Faculty of Law expanded its physical presence to Biscay (Bizkaia Campus), thus creating the Biscay division of the Faculty of Law, thus constituting the Faculty of Law in two divisions, Gipuzkoa and Biscay.

Since the remodelling of the Faculty of Social Sciences and Communication, the Biscay division of the Faculty of Law occupies the Aulario, the building that was formerly used for the theoretical classes of the Faculty of Social Sciences and Communication of the University of the Basque Country.

The Biscay division of the Faculty of Law is located in Barrio Sarriena in Leioa (Biscay), on the Bizkaia Campus.

The Faculty of Law of the UPV/EHU offers the bachelor's degree in Law entirely in Basque, in Spanish and in English. The cut-off mark for the bachelor's degree in Law at the Gipuzkoa division of the Faculty of Law is 7.258, while at the Biscay division of the Faculty of Law it is 10.091.

== Structure ==
Currently, the Faculty of Law of the University of the Basque Country has two buildings that house both sections of the faculty, the one in Guipúzcoa and the one in Vizcaya. Both buildings have auditorium, lounge and hall spaces, where symposiums, presentations, forums and other types of academic events are usually held.

At the Faculty of Law in Gipuzkoa (Gipuzkoa Campus):

- David Kato Hall (in honour of David Kato)
- Clara Campoamor Hall (in honour of Clara Campoamor)

At the Faculty of Law in Biscay (Bizkaia Campus):

- Justo Gárate Hall (in honour of Justo Gárate)

== Internal organization ==
=== Commissions ===
- Equality Commission
- Basque Language Commission
- Academic Planning and Validation Commission
- Quality Commission

=== Departments ===
The Departments of the Faculty of Law include:

- Department of Administrative Law, Constitutional Law and Philosophy of Law
- Department of Civil Law
- Department of Constitutional Law and History of Thought and Social and Political Movements
- Department of Ecclesiastical Law of the State and Roman Law
- Department of Public International Law, International Relations and History of Law
- Department of Public Law
- Department of Business Law
- Department of Applied Economics
- Department of Basque Language and Communication

== Deans ==
- (1980–1982)
- José Manuel Castells (1982–1983)
- Gurutz Jauregi (1983–1987)
- José Manuel Castells (1987–1993)
- (1993–2006)
- Francisco Javier Quel López (2006–2012)
- Demetrio Loperena Rota (2012–2013)
- Juana Goizueta Vértiz (2013–2022)
- Alberto Emparanza Sobejano (2022-)

== Basque language ==
The Faculty of Law of the UPV/EHU has worked hard to promote the Basque language in law. Among many other projects is the LEGEAK-LEYES project, which translates many legal documents into Basque in order to be able to work in Basque. There is also a Legal Basque Service. The Faculty of Law of the UPV/EHU publishes the academic journal Zuzenbidea Ikasten, to promote research and publication on Law in the Basque language.

== Equality ==
The Faculty of Law of the UPV/EHU also works for equality and gender perspective. There is an Equality Commission of the Faculty of Law that is in charge of activities and initiatives, for example the two main Halls of the San Sebastián building and the Leioa building of the Faculty of Law of the University of the Basque Country were called Aurora Arnaiz Amigo (Leioa) and Clara Campoamor (San Sebastián).

The current chairperson of the Equality Commission of the Faculty of Law is professor Arantza Campos Rubio, full professor of philosophy of law.

== Legal Clinic ==
The Legal Clinic for Social Justice (CJJS) of the Faculty of Law of the UPV/EHU is understood not only as a transformation in the pedagogical system of Law (combination of theory and practice), but as a laboratory for reflection and identification of anti-discriminatory legal strategies through which students are aware of their important role in achieving a more just society

Through the Clinic, social awareness or critical awareness is created, but, in addition, in its theoretical-practical activity it would generate knowledge aimed at solving the situations of the most socially disadvantaged people.

A Clinic model such as the one envisaged for the Faculty of Law is unthinkable without people committed to the problems of the most vulnerable people, which is where we believe the key to the social function of the university lies. The current Director of the CJJS is Maggy Barrère Unzueta, professor of Philosophy of Law.

== The Faculty of Law (Biscay division) ==
=== Sructure ===
The Biscay division of the Faculty of Law was established in 1997. It is located in Barrio Sarriena in Leioa (Biscay), on the Bizkaia Campus.

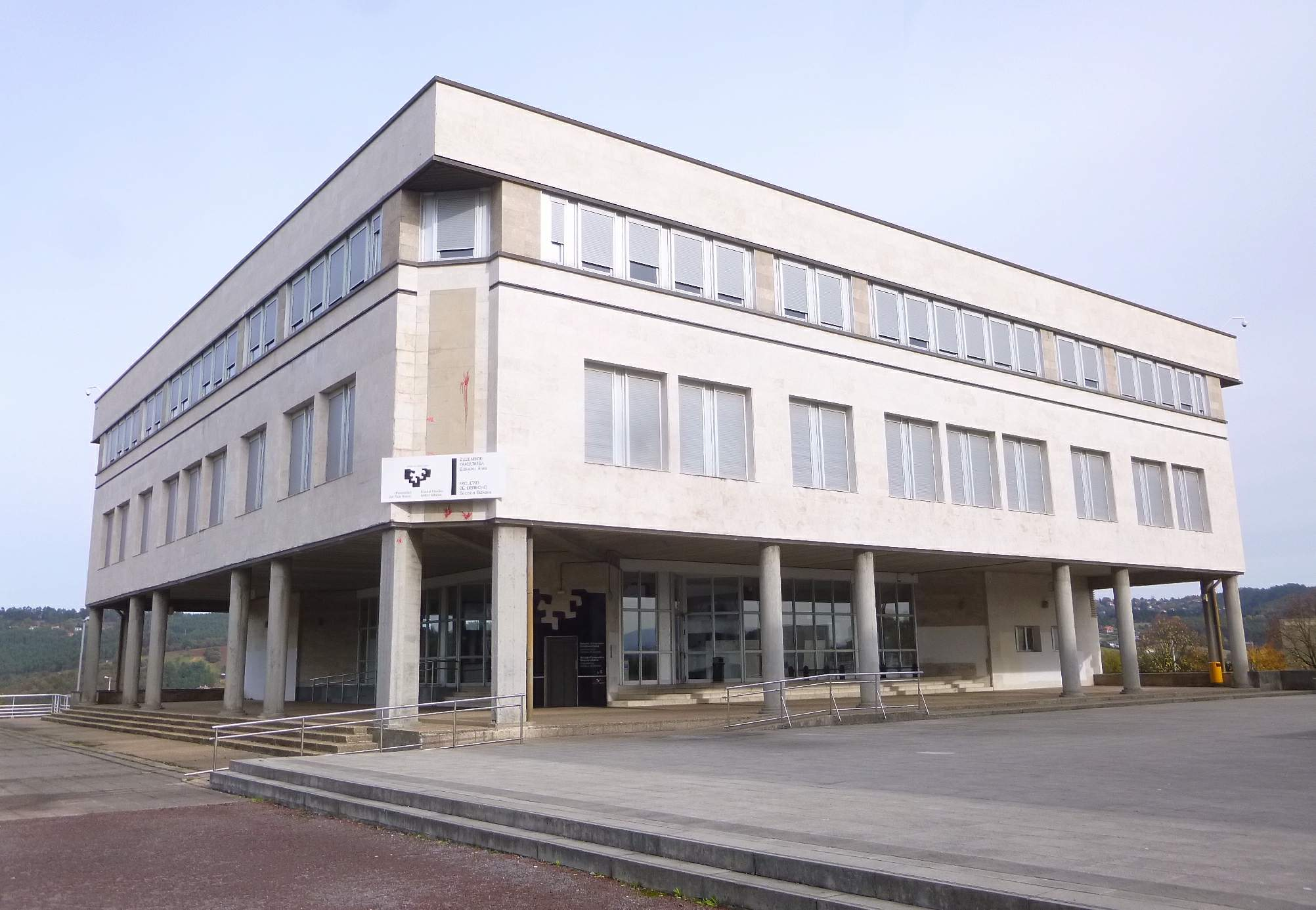
Building of the Faculty of Law (Biscay division)

The Faculty has had 12 licenciate degree in law promotions and in 2010 the first bachelor's degree in law students were enrolled (post-Bologna Process), with the 2013-2014 promotion being the 1st post-Bologna Bachelor's Degree in Law Promotion and the 2016-2017 promotion being the 4th post-Bologna Bachelor's Degree in Law.

The Faculty of Law of the UPV/EHU offers the bachelor's degree in Law entirely in Basque, in Spanish and in English. The cut-off mark for the bachelor's degree in Law at the Gipuzkoa division of the Faculty of Law is 7.258, while at the Biscay division of the Faculty of Law it is 10.091. That is why students with the best academic records are admitted in the Biscay division of the Faculty of Law and those with the lowest grades in the Gipuzkoa division.

=== New Project ===
At the beginning of 2000, an agreement was made between the Bilbao City Council and the UPV/EHU for the expansion of the Vizcaya University Campus, within the UPV/EHU Campus Development Plan 2005/2010.

According to the agreement, the new building for Economic and Legal Sciences will be built on the land next to the Sarriko Faculty. The new building would be built on a surface area of 8,335.72 m^{2}, located on Camino de Etxezuri, next to the land of the Sarriko Faculty. The building would be used for teaching, research and university management, mainly in the area of Economic and Legal Sciences.

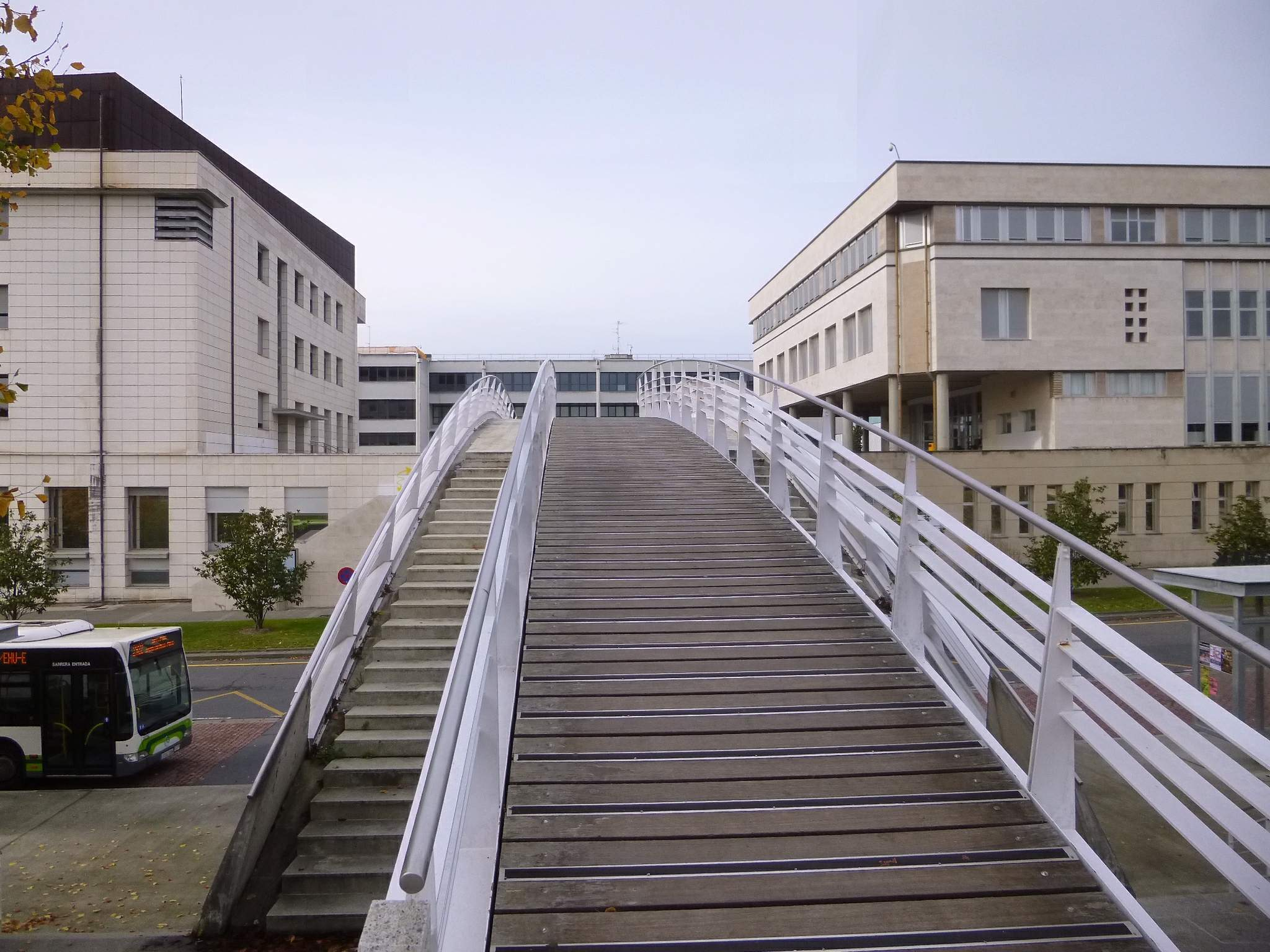
Building of the Faculty of Law (Biscay division)

This new building, which would include the Economic-Legal Pole of the UPV/EHU, was planned to be the transfer from the Leioa campus of the Vizcaya Faculty of Law, Labour Relations and the Elcano School of Business.

For this purpose, the Bilbao City Council gave up a green area in 2006. It was in this same operation that the UPV received another plot to build the Faculty of Medicine next to the Basurto hospital, in exchange for giving the City Council the plot currently occupied by Termibus.

However, due to the economic crisis and budgets, of this entire plan together with Sarriko, only the construction of a multipurpose R&D&I centre of 3,200 square metres will be started on land belonging to the Intxisu ikastola, an area that is now used as a car park. This building will house a business incubator, the school for entrepreneurs, and classrooms for master's and doctoral studies.

On 22 March 2018, Bilbao voted on the new PGOU, which will expand the University of the Basque Country in Bilbao and within this project will be the expansion that was not carried out due to lack of funding, turning Bilbao into a university city.

== Notable academic staff ==
- Alberto Emparanza Sobejano, full professor of commercial law
- Nerea Iráculis, full professor of commercial law
- Jon-Mirena Landa, full professor of criminal law
- Idoia Otaegui, professor of international private law
- Joxerramon Bengoetxea, full professor of philosophy of law
- José Ignacio Cubero, full professor of administrative law
- Unai Aberasturi, full professor of administrative law
- Adela Asúa Batarrita, full professor of criminal law
- Norberto J. de la Mata Barranco, full professor of criminal law
- Cándido Conde-Pumpido, professor of civil law
- Arantza Campos Rubio, full professor of philosophy of law
- Miren Karmele Azkarate Villar, full professor of Basque literature
- Miren Gorrotxategi, professor of constitutional law
- Juan de Dios Doval Mateo, professor of civil law

== Notable alumni ==
The Faculty of Law of the UPV/EHU notable alumni include, among others, Bakartxo Tejeria, Juan José Ibarretxe, Joseba Egibar, Borja Sémper, Maddalen Iriarte, Joseba Azkarraga, Iñaki Arriola, Jesús Eguiguren, Miren Gorrotxategi, Ramiro González, Arantza Quiroga, Eneko Goia...

== See also ==
- University of the Basque Country
