= International Congress on Human Rights (2018) =

Human rights conference

- Genre: Human rights and international law conference
- Organiser: Basque Government; Government of Spain; United Nations; Amnesty International; European Union; University of the Basque Country
- Website: humanrightscongress.org

The International Congress on Human Rights was an international congress held in Bilbao, in 2018, organized by the University of the Basque Country, the Basque Government and the Government of Spain, with the collaboration of the United Nations, Amnesty International, the European Union and other international organizations.

The objective of the congress was to celebrate the 70th anniversary of the Universal Declaration of Human Rights (UDHR) of 1948. The congress participated, among others, the president of the UN Human Rights Committee Fabián Salvioli, the president of the UN Committee on Economic, Social and Cultural Rights Virgínia Brás Gomes, the President of the Basque Government Iñigo Urkullu, Jonan Fernández, Manuel Lezertua, Liora Lazarus, Jon-Mirena Landa, Adela Asúa Batarrita...

== History ==
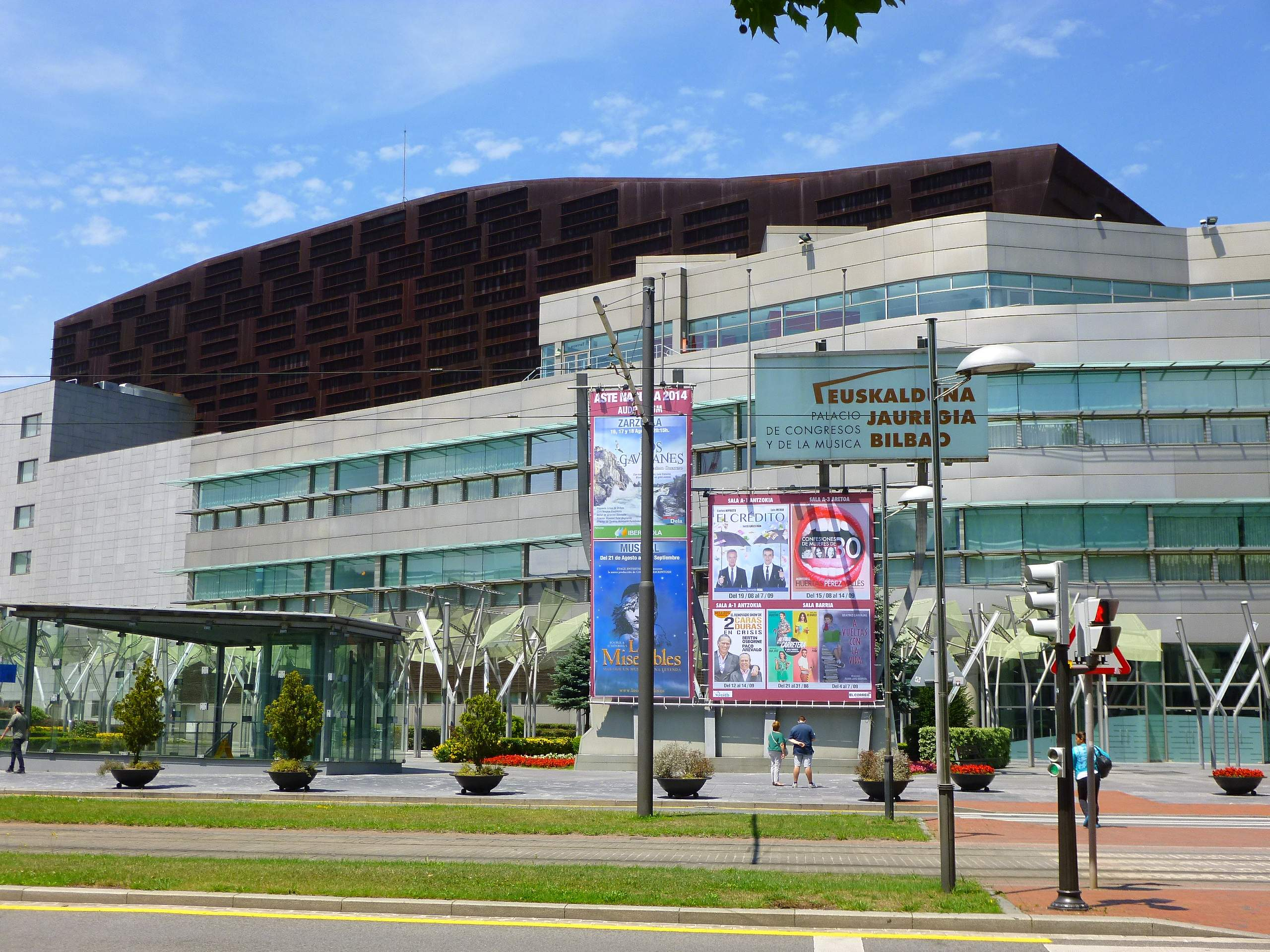
The Euskalduna Conference Centre and Concert Hall in Bilbao, where the International Congress on Human Rights (2018) took place.

The main objective of the congress was to take stock of the evolution of International Law and Human Rights on the occasion of the 70th anniversary of the approval of the Universal Declaration of Human Rights (UDHR) of 1948, as well as to seek a diagnosis of its current moment. and reflect on their evolution and if they have a future as a basic material and conceptual reference. The congress focused on how human rights pose emerging challenges that have to do with the management of values such as diversity and solidarity in coexistence or education, and that are reflected in realities such as refugees, migrations, poverty, the environmental challenge, religious or cultural plurality, gender equality, the rights of LGBT people, new forms of exclusion and injustice, or in responses to the threat of international terrorism or war.

The congress was held on November 7, 8 and 9, 2018 at the Euskalduna Conference Centre and Concert Hall in Bilbao. In the congress there were different conferences, presentations and oral communications by different experts in human rights and international law.

The congress was closed by the President of the Basque Government Iñigo Urkullu, along with the Vice President Josu Erkoreka.

=== Conferences ===
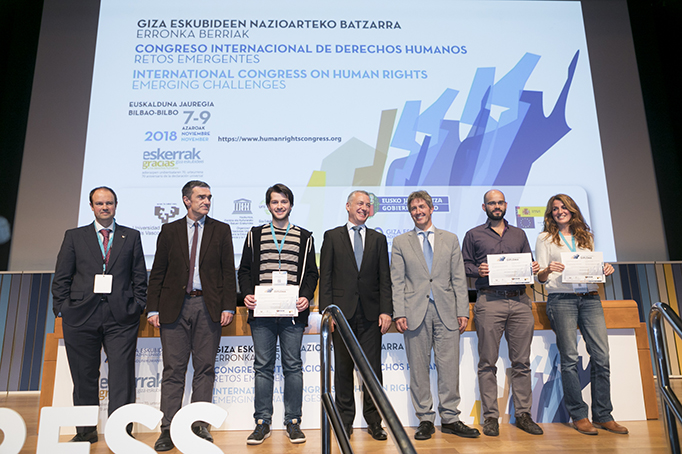
Iñigo Urkullu awarding the ICHR Award for the Best Conference on human rights (Bilbao, 2018). From left to right, Jon-Mirena Landa, Jonan Fernández, Andoni Polo Roca, Iñigo Urkullu, Patxi Juaristi, Javier Francisco Arenas Ferro and Mar Gijón Mendigutía.

The congress was made up of around a hundred conferences and round tables that took place throughout the different days in which the congress took place. The best conferences on human rights of the congress were awarded the ICHR Award for the best conference. The speakers at the congress who were awarded with the ICHR Award for the best conference on human rights were the following four: Mar Gijón Mendigutía, María López Belloso/Borja Sanz Urquijo (together), Javier Francisco Arenas Ferro and Andoni Polo Roca.

== Book ==
The conferences and contributions made at the congress were collected in the book: Landa Gorostiza, Jon-Mirena and Garro Carrera, Enara (coord.) (2019). Emerging challenges of Human Rights: Guarantees in danger? Tirant Lo Blanch. Valencia.

== Future editions ==
Taking into account the success of the international congress, the Basque Government and the Government of Spain took the initiative to hold another future congress during 2022–2024.

== See also ==
- Conferences in Medieval Studies
