= Idoia Otaegui =

Basque lawyer, legal scholar and professor of law (born 1968)

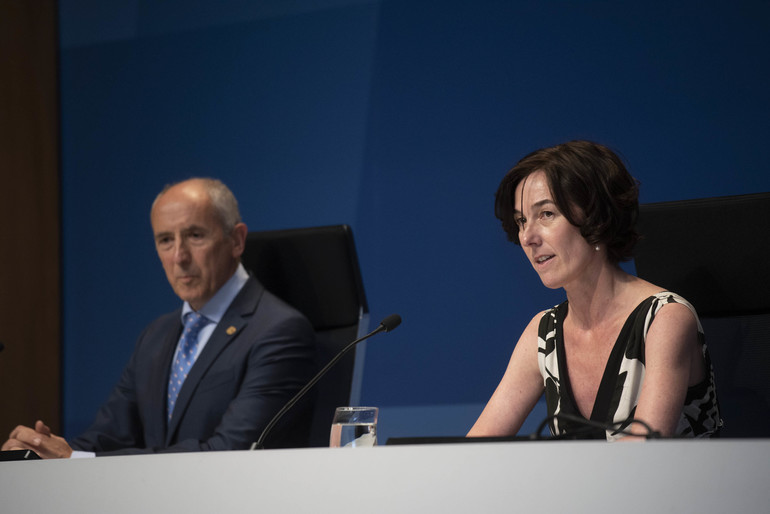
- Josu Erkoreka and Idoia Otaegui

Deputy Minister of Justice of the Basque Government
- In office 2005–2009
- Appointed by: Joseba Azkarraga (Minister)
- President: Juan José Ibarretxe

Personal details
- Born: Idoia Otaegui Aizpurúa; 1968 (age 57–58) San Sebastián (Basque Country); Spain
- Children: 1
- Education: University of the Basque Country (Lic., PhD)
- Occupation: Lawyer, legal scholar and professor of law

Idoia Otaegui Aizpurúa (born 1968) is a Basque lawyer, jurist, politician and university teacher.

She is currently professor of international law and private international law at the University of the Basque Country.

She held the position of Deputy Minister of Justice of the Basque Government between 2005 and 2009.

== Biography and career ==
Idoia Otaegui was born in San Sebastián, Basque Country, in 1968. She studied a licenciate degree in law in the University of the Basque Country. Later she obtained a doctorate in international law and private international law in 2015 with the thesis "The protection of the rights of minors in the jurisdiction of the European Court of Human Rights. A Private Law perspective", directed by full professor and lawyer Juanjo Álvarez Rubio.

She is currently a university professor of private international law at the University of the Basque Country. She is a member of the Spanish Association of Professors of International Law and International Relations.

Otaegui is currently the director of the International Law and International Relations Courses, organized annually by the University of the Basque Country in the city of Vitoria-Gasteiz.

Since 2020, she has been an academic member of board of the Guipúzcoa Campus of the University of the Basque Country.

== Political career ==
Otaegui was legal advisor to the EA-PNV parliamentary group (formed from the electoral alliance EA-PNV) in the Parliament of Navarra during the years 2000 to 2005. She was also a member of the editorial board of the Eusko Alkartasuna party's magazine Alkartasuna.

In the 2007 Spanish local elections Otaegui was a candidate for council member of the San Sebastián City Council, for the party Eusko Alkartasuna (EA), with Jaione Arratibel Arrondo as a candidate for mayor of San Sebastián. Eusko Alkartasuna obtained two council members in the San Sebastián City Council and Otaegui did not obtain a seat. The PSE obtained eleven council members and Odón Elorza became mayor of San Sebastián.

In 2005 she was appointed Deputy Minister of Justice of the Basque Government, in the VIII Legislature (2005–2009). She was appointed by the Minister of Justice Joseba Azkarraga. Previously she had been the director of the Cabinet of Minister of Justice Joseba Azkarraga in the VII Legislature (2001–2005) of the Basque Government. Both legislatures under the president of government of Juan Jose Ibarretxe and the vice-president Idoia Zenarruzabeitia.

== Publications ==
=== Books ===
- The relevance of the European Court of Human Rights in the protection of the rights of minors, Thomson Reuters Aranzadi, 2017.

=== Articles (selection) ===
- "The erroneous determination of international judicial jurisdiction when children reside in different member states."
- "Towards greater protection of the right to respect for the private and family life of minors in the context of the ECHR and the ECtHR?"
- "Violation of art. 8 ECHR for failure to comply with the positive obligation to facilitate the return of abducted minors."

=== Opinion (selection) ===
- "Legal brushstrokes of the Ana Obregón case", El Diario Vasco (about the surrogacy case of Ana Obregón)

== See also ==
- Jon-Mirena Landa
- Nerea Iráculis
