= Mar Gijón Mendigutía =

Spanish philologist, human rights activist and writer

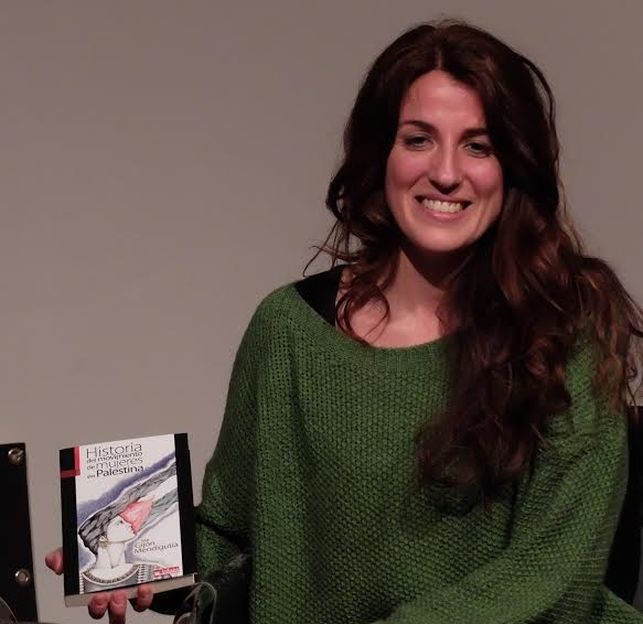
- Mar Gijón Mendigutía at the presentation of the book "History of the women's movement in Palestine" (Bilbao, 2016)
- Born: María del Mar Gijón Mendigutía; 1988 (age 37–38); Madrid (Spain)
- Education: Autonomous University of Madrid
- Occupations: Arabist philologist, human rights activist and writer
- Employer: University of the Basque Country
- Notable work: History of the women's movement in Palestine

María del Mar Gijón Mendigutía (Madrid, 1988) is a Spanish Arabist philologist, human rights activist and writer.

She specializes in the Middle East region (Lebanon, Syria, Iraq and Jordan), in Palestinian history and the situation of women and women's rights in the Middle East. She is also an activist for women's rights and human rights in that geopolitical region.

== Biography and career ==
Mar Gijón Mendigutía was born in Madrid in 1988. She studied a licenciate degree in Arabic philology in the Autonomous University of Madrid (UAM). Later she obtained a doctorate in Arab and Islamic Studies at the Autonomous University of Madrid in 2016.

She specializes in the Middle East (Lebanon, Syria, Iraq and Jordan) and in Palestinian history and the situation of women in the Middle East. She is a member of the association Biladi.

In 2015 she published the book History of the women's movement in Palestine (Txalaparta, Tafalla, 2015) about the situation of women in said territory. For this work she was a candidate for the 2016 Euskadi Literature Prize, in the category of non-fiction.

In 2018 she was a speaker at the International Congress on Human Rights, with the conference "The Universal Declaration of Human Rights and United Nations Resolution 194 (III) of 1948: Links, evolution and perspectives", on the 1948 Arab–Israeli War and the Palestinian issue. Gijón received the ICHR Award for the Best Conference on human rights.

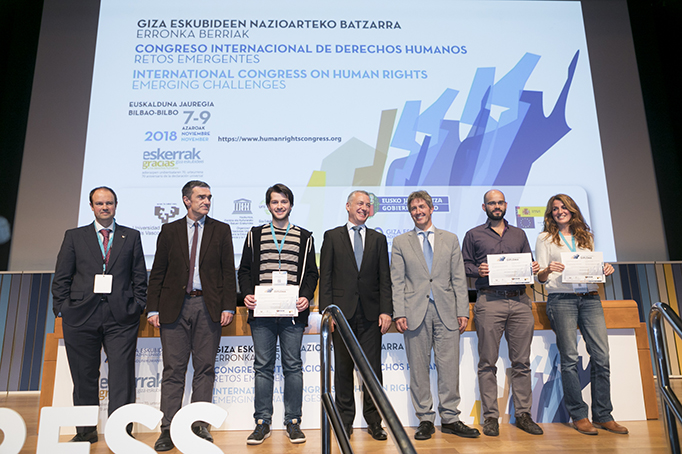
Iñigo Urkullu awarding the ICHR Award for the Best Conference on human rights (Bilbao, 2018). From left to right, Jon-Mirena Landa, Jonan Fernández, Andoni Polo Roca, Iñigo Urkullu, Patxi Juaristi, Javier Francisco Arenas Ferro and Mar Gijón Mendigutía.

She is currently a university teacher and researcher at the University of the Basque Country and a member of the "Valentín de Foronda" Institute of Social History of the University of the Basque Country, the City Council of Vitoria and the Foral Council of Álava.

== Personal life ==
Between 2005 and 2010 he lived in Damascus (Syria). He currently resides in Algorta (Getxo).

== Publications ==
=== Books ===
- History of the women's movement in Palestine, Txalaparta, Tafalla, 2015.

=== Book chapters ===
- «The women's movement in Palestine (1884-1948): The anticolonial struggle as a driving element», en D. Checa Hidalgo, J. Ramos Tolosa Comprender Palestina-Israel: Estudios pluridisciplinares y decoloniales, Universidad de Granada, Granada, 2019.
- «The Universal Declaration of Human Rights and United Nations Resolution 194 (III) of 1948: links, evolution and perspectives» en Jon-Mirena Landa Retos emergentes de los Derechos Humanos: ¿Garantías en peligro?, Tirant lo Blanch, Valencia, 2019.
- «International Solidarity Campaigns with Palestine: Reality and perspectives», en The Palestinian Cause and the Future of the Palestinian National Project, Arab Center for Research & Policy Studies, Qatar, 2016.
- «The Syrian border and Palestinian refugees», en N. Ribas Mateo El Río Bravo Mediterráneo: las regiones fronterizas en la época de la globalización, Ediciones Bellaterra, 2011.
