= Carlos Fuentenebro =

Basque lawyer and jurist

The Most Excellent Carlos Fuentenebro
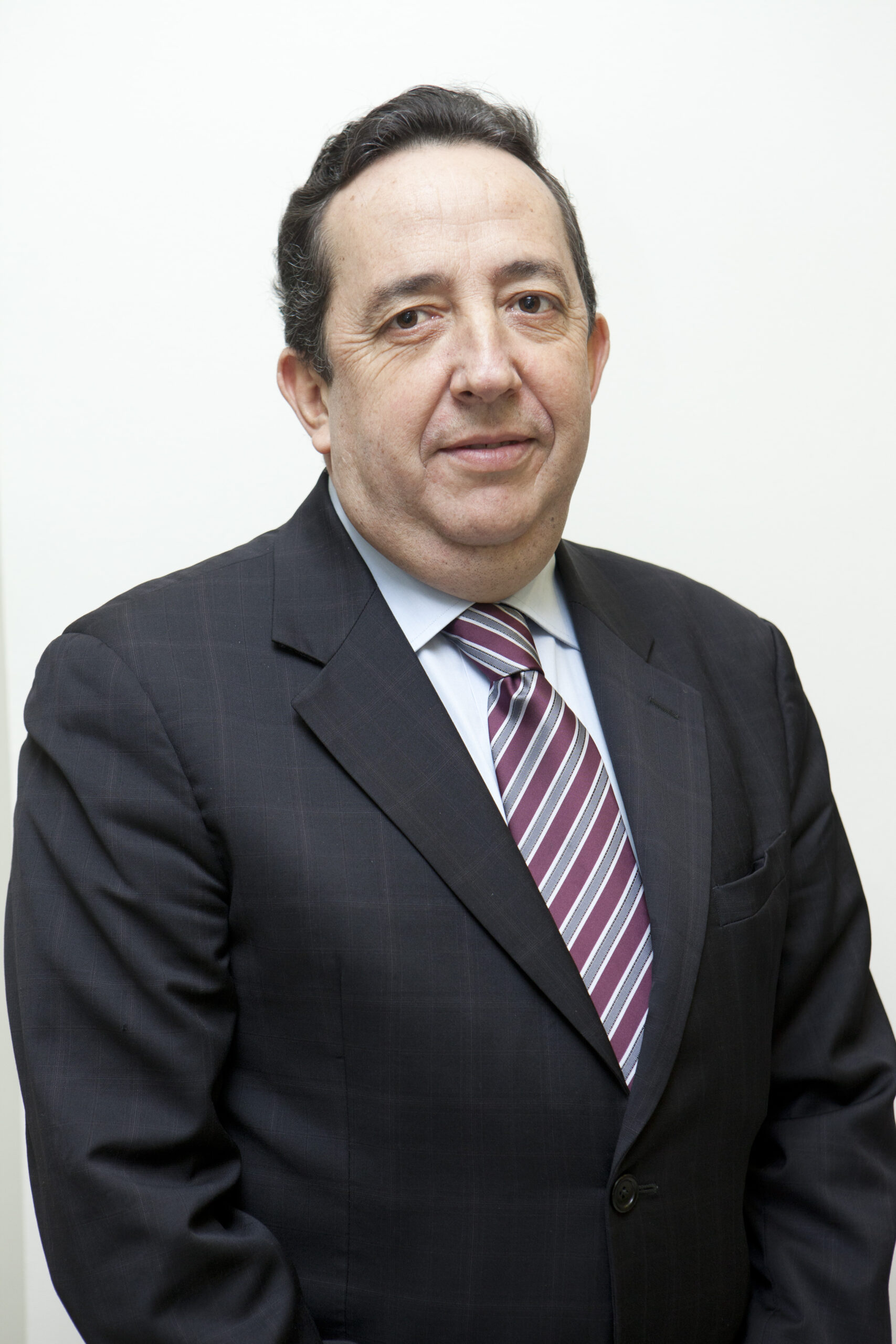

Board Member of the General Council of Spanish Lawyers
- Incumbent
- Assumed office 2024
- President: Victoria Ortega

Vice-Chair of the General Council of Spanish Lawyers
- In office 2016–2024
- President: Victoria Ortega

Chair of the Council of Basque Lawyers
- In office 2020–2021

Chair of the Biscay Bar Association
- In office 2013–2023
- Preceded by: Nazario de Oleaga
- Succeeded by: Maite Morillo

Personal details
- Born: Carlos Fuentenebro Zabala; 1962 (age 63–64) Bilbao, Spain
- Education: University of Deusto
- Awards: Grand Cross of Merit in the Service of the Legal Profession (2023)

Carlos Fuentenebro Zabala (Bilbao, Spain, 1962) is a Basque lawyer, jurist and businessperson. He is currently a board member of the General Council of Spanish Lawyers (CGAE).

Previously, he held the position of vice-chair of the General Council of Spanish Lawyers (CGAE) between 2016 and 2024. He also held the position of chairperson of the Biscay Bar Association between 2013 and 2023. He also held the position of chairperson of the Council of Basque Lawyers between 2020 and 2021.

== Biography and career ==
He graduated in law from the University of Deusto in 1987. Member of the Biscay Bar Association, he began practicing as a lawyer in 1988. His area of practice has been especially civil law, civil liability and insurance law.

In 1999 he became a member of the Governing Board of the Biscay Bar Association as a deputy. In 2013, he ran for bar association elections as chairperson and won, becoming the new chairperson of the Biscay Bar Association and succeeding Nazario de Oleaga, who was at the head of the Biscay Bar Association for ten years (2003–2013). Fuentenebro held the position of chairperson of the Biscay Bar Association for ten years, until 2023, being succeeded by Maite Morillo.

In 2020, Fuentenebro was appointed chairperson of the Council of Basque Lawyers. He held the position until December 2021, when he was succeeded by Antón Echevarrieta Zorrilla, chairperson of the Álava Bar Association.

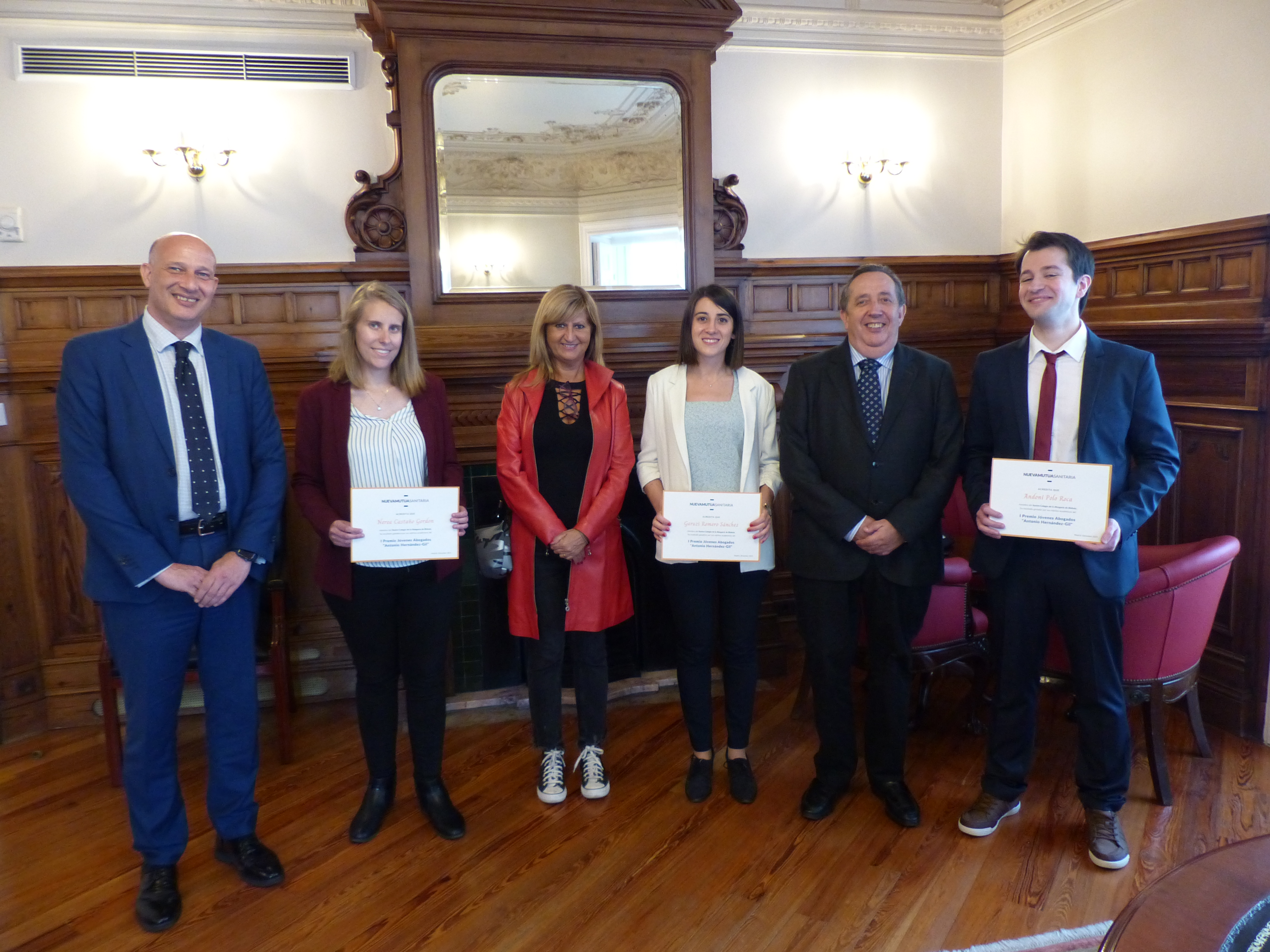
Carlos Fuentenebro presenting the "Antonio Hernández-Gil" Young Lawyers Award (2022). In the photo, from left to right, Luis Javier Santafé, Nerea Castaño, Ana Bermejo, Garazi Romero, Carlos Fuentenebro and Andoni Polo.

In 2016, Fuentenebro joined the candidacy chaired by Victoria Ortega for the General Council of Spanish Lawyers (CGAE), in which Ortega won and she became chairperson of the CGAE and Fuentenebro became a member of the Governing Board and member of its government team. Since 2020, Fuentenebro has been vice-chair of the General Council of Spanish Lawyers (CGAE), with Victoria Ortega as chairperson. As a member of the Governing Board of the CGAE, he chairs the council's training commission. He is also the vice-chair of the Foundation Institute for Training and Research of the Legal Profession-Future Lawyers. He served as vice-chair of the General Council of Spanish Lawyers (CGAE) until 2024.

Fuentenebro practices as a lawyer at the IparBilbao-Roca Junyent law firm, which in 2019 joined the law firm of lawyer and former politician Miquel Roca RocaJunyent.

In 2022 Fuentenebro joined Ricardo Barkala's candidacy for the elections of the Athletic Club of Bilbao. In 2023, Fuentenebro received the Grand Cross of Merit in the Service of the Legal Profession in recognition of his career as a lawyer.

In 2024, Fuentenebro was elected "Elective Board Member" (consejero electivo, in Spanish) of the General Council of Spanish Lawyers, together with Encarnación Orduna, within the appointment of the twelve elective board members of the General Council of Spanish Lawyers, who must be lawyers of recognized prestige, elected by vote and with a mandate of four years. He was elected for the 2024–2028 term.

== Awards and honours ==
- Grand Cross of Merit in the Service of the Legal Profession

== Personal life ==
He lives in Bilbao.

== See also ==
- Victoria Ortega
- Antonio Hernández-Gil Álvarez-Cienfuegos
- General Council of Spanish Lawyers
