= José Ignacio Cubero =

Basque lawyer, legal scholar and professor of law

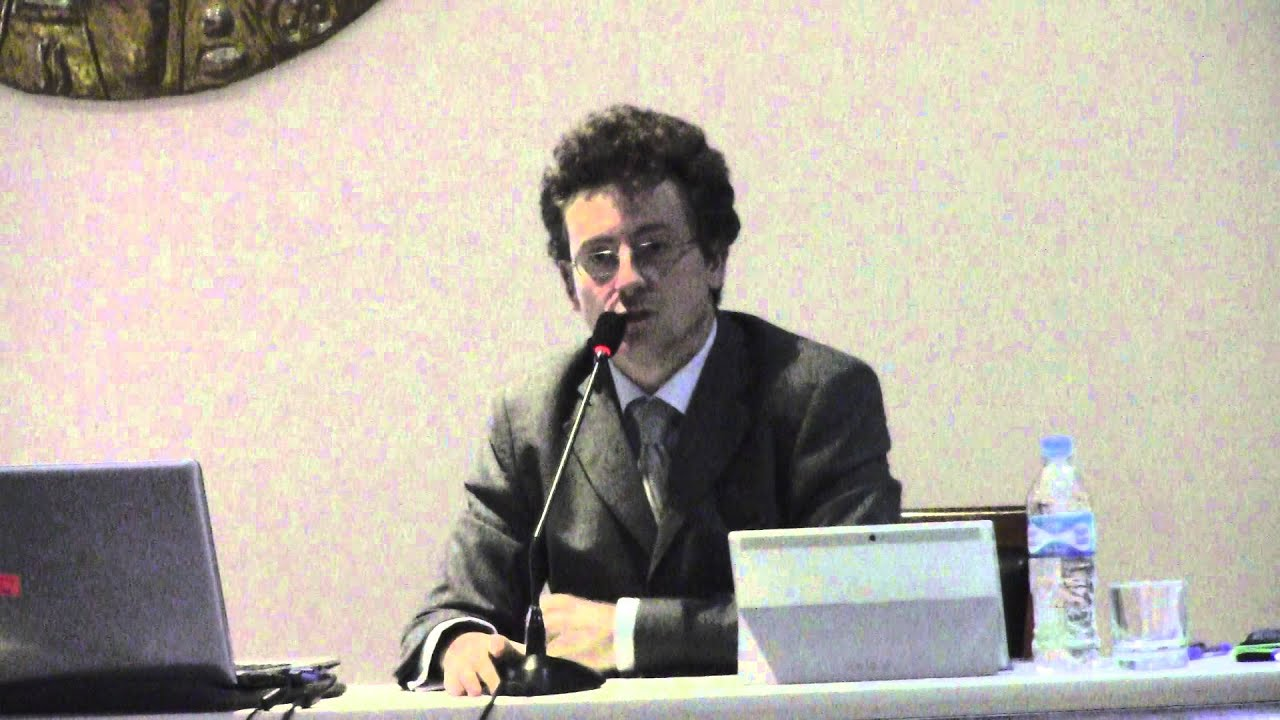
- Born: José Ignacio Cubero Marcos; 6 April 1974 (age 52); Getxo (Basque Country); Spain
- Education: University of Deusto (BA); University of the Basque Country (PhD)
- Occupations: Lawyer, legal scholar and professor of law

José Ignacio Cubero Marcos (born in Getxo on 6 April 1974) is a Basque lawyer, legal scholar and professor of law.

He is currently a full professor of public and administrative law at the University of the Basque Country.

== Biography and career ==
José Ignacio Cubero Marcos was born in Getxo (Basque Country) on 6 April 1974. He studied a licenciate degree in law at the University of Deusto and graduated in 1997. Later he obtained a doctorate in law at the University of the Basque Country in 2007, with the thesis "Legal regime of the networks interconnection obligation in the telecommunications sector", directed by the Spanish full professor Iñaki Lasagabaster Herrarte.

He has practiced as a lawyer since 2006, being member of the Biscay Bar Association. In 2006 he began as a university professor of public and administrative law at the University of the Basque Country. He teaches in different law subjects, such as, public law, administrative law, economic law, environmental law or fundamental rights. He is currently a full professor of public and administrative law at the University of the Basque Country. He is an expert in administrative law, telecommunications law, economic law, environmental law, regulated sectors law (banking law, energy law, pharmaceutical law, gaming law, ...) and fundamental rights. In addition, he is also a member of the board of the publishing house of the University of the Basque Country.

He is also a member of the Interdisciplinary Centre for Legal Studies, along with other members such as Iñaki Lasagabaster, Iñigo Urrutia or Unai Aberasturi, a research centre that brings together professors, researchers, lawyers, consultants and lawyers, whose mission is to prepare reports, papers and hold seminars on the most current issues of Law, preparing reports for public and private institutions, governments, NGOs or associations. In 2019, the Interdisciplinary Centre for Legal Studies was responsible for bringing to the United Nations (UN) the violation of the rights of imprisoned people, in relation to the policies of removing prisoners from their residences.

As a lawyer, Cubero has handled various legal cases, among them, in matters of urban law, he has handled the case of legal protection of Mount Kurkudi (Leioa), in relation to the modification of the urban planning plan and reclassification of the protected land, carried out by the Municipal Government of Leioa.

== Private life ==
He is the brother of the Spanish artist Begoña Cubero. They were born into a family of six siblings.

== Publications ==
=== Books ===
- Public safety and fundamental rights, Atelier, 2022.
- Public space and local ordinances: study on its legal regime, Basque Institute of Public Administration, 2017.
- Administrative notifications, Basque Institute of Public Administration, 2017.
- Prior communication, responsible declaration and administrative procedure: special reference to the establishment of activities and the provision of services, Thomson Reuters Aranzadi, 2013.
- The Non Bis In Idem Principle in the Basque Law of the Sanctioning Power, Basque Institute of Public Administration, 2010.
- Access to information, participation and access to justice in environmental matters, Basque Government (Publishing), 2009.

=== Articles (selection) ===
- "Net neutrality. Interconnection and access to networks in the light of the European Electronic Communications Code: shortcomings and future challenges", Revista Española de Derecho Administrativo, 2022.
- "Intermediation platforms, home landlords or real estate agents?: Commentary on the ruling of the Court of Justice of the European Union of 19 December 2019 (Grand Chamber)", Revista Española de Derecho Administrativo, 2020.
- "The so-called “social clauses” in public procurement: competence issues and free competition for setting salary conditions", Revista General de Derecho Administrativo, 2020.
- "Holiday accommodation: towards a balance between administrative control and business freedom", IDP Journal on Internet, Law and Politics (UOC), 2019.
- "Are notifications made by email valid?", Revista de Administración Pública (CEPC), 2017.
- "The expansive vis of fundamental rights and their impact on the configuration and enforceability of social rights", Revista Española de Derecho Constitucional (CEPC), 2017.
- "Obtaining shale gas through hydraulic fracturing (fracking): a cost-benefit analysis for adequate regulatory treatment", Revista Aragonesa de Administración Pública (RArAP), 2014.
- "Control and regulation of credit rating agencies in public debt markets: controversial issues and proposed solutions", Revista de Administración Pública (CEPC), 2012.
- "Regulation, public economic initiative and free competition: towards a model without immunities", Revista de Administración Pública (CEPC), 2011.
- "Protection of personal data in electronic communications: special reference to Law 25/2007, on data retention", Revista Española de Derecho Constitucional (CEPC), 2008.
- "Network interconnections and competition law in the telecommunications sector", Legal Gazette of the European Union and Competition, 2007.
- "The operator with significant weight in the telecommunications interconnection market", REDETI: Journal of Telecommunications and Network Infrastructure Law, 2007.
- "Reflections on the protection of personal data in electronic communications", Revista Vasca de Administración Pública (RVAP), 2007.

== See also ==
- Unai Aberasturi
- Iñaki Lasagabaster
- Nerea Iráculis
