= Doval =

Doval is a surname. Notable people with the surname include:

- Ajit Doval (born 1945), Indian intelligence official
- Camilo Doval (born 1997), Dominican baseball relief pitcher for the New York Yankees
- Fernanda Doval (born 1975), Brazilian volleyball player
- Fernando Rodríguez Doval (born 1980), Mexican politician
- Juan de Dios Doval Mateo (1943-1980), Spanish politician and law professor
- Narciso Horacio Doval (1944-1991), Argentine footballer
- Shaurya Doval, Indian politician
