= Norberto de la Mata =

Basque lawyer, legal scholar and professor of law

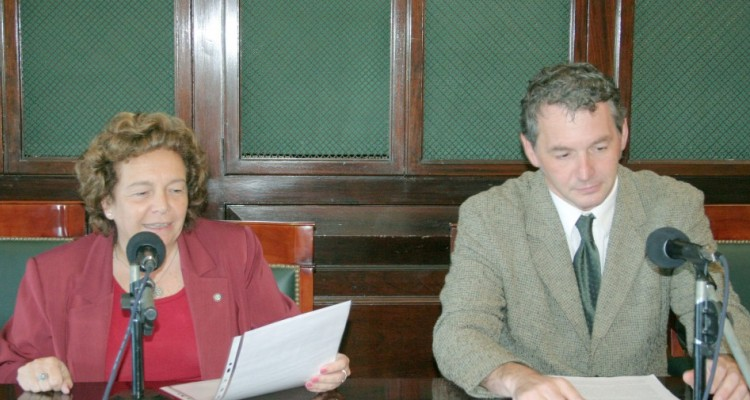
- Stella Maris Martínez and Norberto J. de la Mata
- Born: Norberto Javier de la Mata Barranco; 9 February 1962 (age 64); Bilbao (Basque Country); Spain
- Education: University of Deusto (BA); University of the Basque Country (PhD); University of Murcia (BA)
- Occupations: Lawyer, legal scholar and professor of law
- Employer(s): University of the Basque Country; Barrilero Asociados

Norberto Javier de la Mata Barranco (born in Bilbao on 9 February 1962) is a Basque lawyer, legal scholar and professor of law.

He is currently a full professor of criminal law at the University of the Basque Country. He is a lawyer at the international law firm Barrilero Asociados.

== Biography and career ==
Norberto de la Mata was born in Bilbao (Basque Country) on 9 February 1962. He studied a licentiate degree in law at the University of Deusto and graduated with honours in 1986. He later completed postgraduate studies at the University of Freiburg in Germany. Later he obtained a doctorate in law at the University of the Basque Country in 1992, with the thesis "Criminal protection of property and appropriation crimes. Money as a material object of the crimes of theft and misappropriation.", directed by the Spanish full professor and magistrate of the Constitutional Court Adela Asúa Batarrita. He later obtained also a bachelor's degree in criminology from the University of Murcia in 2008.

He has practiced as a lawyer since 1990, being member of the Biscay Bar Association. In 1991 he began as a university professor of criminal law at the University of the Basque Country. In 1993 he became full professor of criminal law.

Between 2018 and 2022 De la Mata was Vice Dean of the Faculty of Law of the UPV/EHU and director-responsible of the Biscay division of the Faculty of Law, and also a member of the Faculty's Governing Board.

He is member of the International Association of Penal Law since 1990. He is also member of the Spanish Association of Professors of Criminal Law and he was elected the chairperson of the association.

As a lawyer, he practices law at the international law firm Barrilero Asociados, as a criminal defense lawyer. In addition to legal practice as a lawyer, he held the position of judge (substitute) in the Provincial Court of Biscay, as a criminal judge, between 1995 and 2000. He is an expert in criminal law, European criminal law, economic criminal law (economic crimes and property crimes, environmental and urban crime and public corruption.

== Publications ==
=== Books ===
- Women, gender and criminal protection, Aranzadi-Thomson Reuters, Navarre, 2023.
- Vulnerable people and criminal protection, Aranzadi-Thomson Reuters, Navarre, 2023.
- Criminal Law: principles, questions, reflections, Comares, Granada, 2022.
- The social integration of the minor victim through reinforced criminal protection, Aranzadi-Thomson Reuters, Navarre, 2020.
- Economic and business criminal law, Dykinson, Madrid, 2018.
- Adaptation of Spanish criminal law to the criminal policy of the European Union, Aranzadi-Thomson Reuters, Navarre, 2017.
- European criminal law and Spanish legislation: The reforms of the Penal Code, Tirant Lo Blanch, Valencia, 2015.
- Computer criminal law, Aranzadi-Thomson Reuters, Navarre, 2010.
- The individualization of punishment in the Courts of Justice, Aranzadi-Thomson Reuters, Navarre, 2008.
- El principio de proporcionalidad penal, Tirant Lo Blanch, Valencia, 2007.
- La respuesta a la corrupción pública, Comares, Granada, 2003.

== See also ==
- Biscay Bar Association
- International Association of Penal Law
- Faculty of Law, University of the Basque Country
