= Mario López (disambiguation) =

Mario Lopez (born 1973) is an American actor and television host.

Mario López may also refer to:

- Mario López Estrada (1938-2023), Guatemalan telecommunications businessman
- Mario Lopez (jurist) (born 1955), Justice of the Supreme Court of the Philippines
- Mario López Valdez (born 1957), Mexican businessman and politician
- Mario López (footballer) (born 1995), Paraguayan footballer

== See also ==
- Maria Lopez (disambiguation)
