= José Luis del Valle =

Spanish lawyers and sports leader

- Born: José Luis del Valle Iturriaga; 25 August 1901; Bilbao, Biscay, Spain
- Died: 4 November 1983 (aged 82); Madrid, Spain
- Citizenship: Spanish
- Occupations: Lawyer; sports leader

11th
- In office 1935–1936
- Preceded by: Rafael González
- Succeeded by: José María Fernández

José Luis del Valle Iturriaga (25 August 1901 – 4 November 1983) was a Spanish lawyer who held various positions of responsibility in the legal field. However, he is best known for being the 11th president of Atlético Madrid between 1935 and 1936. He co-directed a match for Spain as coach.

== Professional career ==
Born in Bilbao, José Luis del Valle studied and graduated in law at the Complutense University of Madrid in 1920. Five years later, in 1925, he joined the Bar Association of Madrid, a professional corporation of public law that brings together the lawyers of Madrid, in which he held several positions of responsibility on the governing board of Manuel Escobedo Duato.

After holding various positions on the College Board, del Valle was elected Dean and president in December 1964, therefore, of the General Council of Spanish Lawyers, a position he held until 1972. He was an academic of Jurisprudence and Legislation in 1969, a member of the General Codification Commission, and a member of Spanish and international legal societies, such as L'Union Internationale des Avocats (International Union of Lawyers) in 1971, of which he was vice president, thus becoming the first Spaniard to preside over it.

Del Valle was also an author, writing several legal studies, but also Reconstrucción del molino de Guecho, El poemario Entre la Ría y el mar (1935), and El Decano rinde cuentas (1969).

Del Valle was honored with the distinction of knight of the Order of Charles III, he was also awarded other recognitions in Italy, Sweden, and Morocco.

== Sporting career ==
On 20 February 1935, del Valle was named president of Atlético Madrid, deciding to organize a tour of South America to raise funds. This tour caused a negative aspect in the physical condition of the players that would impact their relegation at the end of the 1935–36 season, so del Valle resigned from his position on 4 May 1936.

Later he would be elected vice president of the Castilian Football Federation. On 19 June 1955, del Valle, together with Emilio Jiménez, Pablo Hernández, and Juan Touzón, co-directed a friendly match of the Spain national team, which ended in a 3–0 victory over Switzerland thanks to goals from Enrique Collar, Eneko Arieta, and José María Maguregui. In 1955, in the absence of a national coach, he accompanied Juan Touzón, who would also become president of Atlético de Madrid, and Ramón Melcón on the National Team bench in a Switzerland-Spain qualifier for the 1958 FIFA World Cup, which ended in a 3–0 victory.

== Death ==
Del Valle died in Madrid on 4 November 1983, at the age of 82.

== Sources ==
- Pérez-Bustamante, Rogelio (1996). El Ilustre Colegio de Abogados de Madrid [The Illustrious Bar Association of Madrid]. Madrid: Ilustre Colegio de Abogados de Madrid. ISBN 8492163909.
