= Maria Lopez (disambiguation) =

Maria Lopez is a judge.

Maria Lopez may also refer to:

== Sportspeople ==
- María López (María López de Eguilaz Zubiria, born 1984), Spanish field hockey goalkeeper
- María López (basketball) represented Paraguay in 1953 FIBA World Championship for Women
- María López Coton, represented Argentina at the 2011 Pan American Games
- María López (footballer), represented Dominican Republic in 2016 CONCACAF Women's U-17 Championship qualification
- María López (field hockey), Peruvian player in 2014–15 Women's FIH Hockey World League Round 1
- María López García (born 1990), played for Spain women's national field hockey team
- María López Nery, represented Paraguay at the 2013 World Aquatics Championships
- Maria Lopez (swimmer), represented Bolivia at the 2010 Summer Youth Olympics
- Marieta López (María López Hidalgo, born 1988), Spanish footballer

== Other uses ==
- María Ygnacia López de Carrillo (1793–1849), Californio ranchera
- Maria Isabel Lopez (born 1958), Filipina movie and television actress
- Maria Chapa Lopez, American attorney
- María López Belloso, Basque lawyer, jurist, human rights activist and writer
- María López de Gurrea, Spanish noblewoman
- María López Mares, see LVIII Legislature of the Mexican Congress
- María López Morante, actress in Malvaloca (1942 film)
- Maria Lopez Pacheco, see Juan López Pacheco, Duke of Escalona
- María López de Rivas Martínez (1560–1640), Spanish Discalced Carmelite
- María López Sández (born 1973), Spanish Galician philologist and essayist
- María López Urbina, see Mireille Roccatti

== Fictional characters ==
- Maria Lopez, fictional character in Saved by the Bell: The New Class
- Maria Lopez (Passions character)

== See also ==
- María José López (disambiguation)
- Judge Maria Lopez, TV show
