= María José López =

María José López may refer to:

- María José López Herrera (born 1984), Mexican tennis player
- María José López (Peruvian footballer) (born 1985), Peruvian football attacking midfielder
- María José López (Mexican footballer) (born 1993), Mexican football defender

== See also ==
- Maria Lopez (disambiguation)
- Josephine Lys (fl. 2007-present), born Maria José López Sánchez, Spanish writer and lawyer
