= Jon-Mirena Landa =

Basque lawyer, legal scholar and professor of law

Spokesperson of the Police Abuse Assessment Commission of the Basque Government
- Incumbent
- Assumed office 2018
- Appointed by: Basque Government
- President: Iñigo Urkullu

Director of Human Rights of the Basque Government
- In office 2005–2009
- Appointed by: Joseba Azkarraga (Minister)
- President: Juan José Ibarretxe

Personal details
- Born: Jon-Mirena Landa Gorostiza; 1968 (age 57–58) Portugalete (Basque Country); Spain
- Education: University of Deusto; University of the Basque Country
- Occupation: Lawyer, legal scholar and professor of law

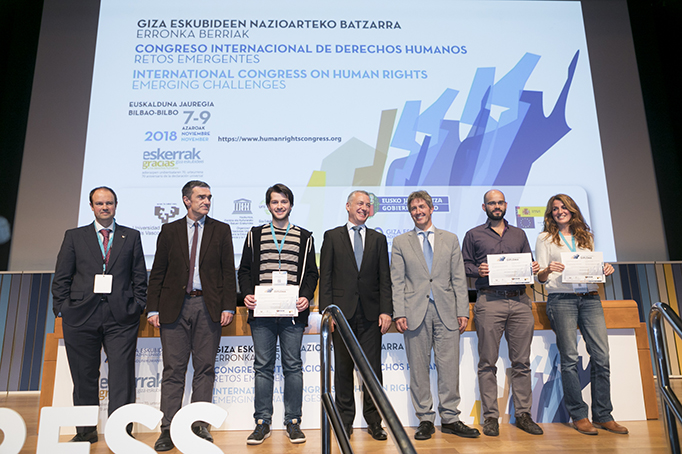
Jon-Mirena Landa (far left) at the International Human Rights Congress in Bilbao, 2018.

Jon-Mirena Landa Gorostiza (born 1968) is a Basque lawyer, legal scholar and professor of law.

He is currently a full professor of Criminal Law at the University of the Basque Country and also the director of the UNESCO Chair of Human Rights and Public Powers of the University of the Basque Country.

He currently also holds the position of Spokesperson of the Police Abuse Assessment Commission of the Basque Government since 2018.

He previously held the position of Director of Human Rights of the Basque Government between 2005 and 2009.

== Early life and education ==
Jon-Mirena Landa was born in Portugalete, Basque Country, in 1968. He studied a licenciate degree in law in the University of Deusto. Later he obtained a doctorate in law at the University of the Basque Country in 1998, with the thesis "Criminal intervention against xenophobia. General problems, with special reference to the ""crime of provocation"" of article 510 of the penal code", directed by the Spanish full professor and magistrate of the Constitutional Court Adela Asúa Batarrita.

== Career ==
Since 1992 he has been a university teacher of law and criminal law at the University of the Basque Country. Since 2001 he has been a full professor of criminal law at the University of the Basque Country.

As a professor and researcher, his lines of research have focused mainly on the field of the criminal law, human rights, hate crimes, penitentiary law or International Human Rights Law.

He has been a visiting professor or visiting researcher, among others, at the universities of Hamburg, Heidelberg and the Lauterpacht Centre for International Law of the University of Cambridge. In November 2005 he was awarded the Vom Humboldt research scholarship. He is currently a full professor of Criminal Law at the University of the Basque Country and also the director of the UNESCO Chair of Human Rights and Public Powers of the University of the Basque Country.

Landa is also the expert appointed by the Basque Government to prepare annual reports on hate crimes, or to prepare reports on victims of police abuse, political violence and others.

In 2005 Landa was appointed Director of Human Rights of the Basque Government, by the Regional Minister of Justice Joseba Azkarraga. He was appointed as an independent professional (without political affiliation). He held the position during the VIII Legislature of the Basque Government (2005–2009).

In 2016, the Basque Parliament approved the so-called "Police Abuse Law" (Law 12/2016, of July 28, on recognition and reparation of victims of human rights violations in the context of politically motivated violence in the Autonomous Community of the Basque Country between 1978 and 1999), which recognized all victims of police abuse committed in Euskadi between 1978 and 1999. Among others, there are victims like those in the Killing of Lasa and Zabala.

To this end, the Police Abuse Law created the "Assessment Commission" of the Basque Government (Assessment Commission for the recognition and reparation of victims of police abuse). The commission was established in 2018. Landa was appointed as one of the members of the Assessment Commission by the Basque Government (along with others, such as the forensic experts Francisco Etxeberria and Benito Morentin or the human rights director Jonan Fernández). Within the Assessment Commission he was appointed spokesperson.

== Publications ==
=== Books ===
- Víctimas invisibles: usos y abusos de la verdad, la justicia y la reparación de las víctimas de la violencia política a la luz de la lucha antiterrorista contra ETA, Tirant lo Blanch, 2023.
- Retos emergentes de los Derechos Humanos: ¿Garantías en peligro?, Tirant Lo Blanch, Valencia, 2019. ISBN 978-84-1313-877-0
- Prisión y alternativas en el nuevo Código Penal tras la reforma 2015, Instituto Internacional de Sociología Instituto Internacional de Sociología Jurídica de Oñati, Colección Derecho y Sociedad, Dykinson, Madrid, 2016, 310 págs. ISBN 978-84-9148-015-0
- Delincuentes peligrosos, Trotta, Madrid, 2014, ISBN 978-84-9879-556-1
- Justicia transicional: propuestas para el caso vasco, Institut Universitaire Varenne Collection Transition & Justice 2014, ISBN 978-2-37032-021-6
- Víctimas de vulneraciones de derechos humanos derivadas de la violencia de motivación política, 2009.
- La complicidad delictiva y la actividad laboral cotidiana (Contribución al límite mínimo de la participación frente a los actos neutros), Comares, Granada, 2002.
- La política criminal contra la xenofobia y las tendencias expansionistas del derecho penal (a la vez una propuesta interpretativa de la "normativa antidiscriminatoria" del CP 1995 y un análisis crítico de la incipiente jurisprudencia), Comares, Granada, 2001.
- La intervención penal frente a la xenofobia (Problemática general con especial referencia al “delito de provocación” del artículo 510 del Código penal), Universidad del País Vasco, Bilbao, 1999.

== See also ==
- Norberto de la Mata
- Cándido Conde-Pumpido
- Susana Serrano-Gazteluurrutia
