= Antonio Hernández-Gil Álvarez-Cienfuegos =

Spanish lawyer, legal scholar, and full professor (1953–2020)

The Most Excellent Antonio Hernández-Gil

Chairperson of the Madrid Bar Association
- In office 2007–2020

Vice-Chair of the General Council of Spanish Lawyers
- In office 2008–2018
- President: Victoria Ortega

Personal details
- Born: Antonio Hernández-Gil Álvarez-Cienfuegos; 1953 Burgos, Spain
- Died: 2020 (aged 66–67) Madrid, Spain
- Parent: Antonio Hernández Gil (1915-1994)
- Education: Complutense University of Madrid

Antonio Hernández-Gil Álvarez-Cienfuegos (Burgos, 1953 – Madrid, 2020) was a Spanish lawyer, businessperson, legal scholar and university full professor.

He was the chairperson of the Madrid Bar Association and vice-chair of the General Council of Spanish Lawyers.

== Early life and education ==
He was born in Burgos in 1953. His father was Antonio Hernández Gil (1915-1994), a Spanish lawyer, jurist, judge and politician, president of the Royal Academy of Jurisprudence and Legislation, president of the Council of State, president of the Supreme Court and president of the General Council of the Judiciary. He is the brother of Guadalupe Hernández-Gil Álvarez-Cienfuegos, a lawyer and jurist, member of the Council of State.

He obtained his Bachelor's Degree in Law from the Complutense University of Madrid with the Bachelor's Degree Extraordinary Award. He later received a doctorate in law from the Complutense University of Madrid with the Doctorate Extraordinary Award.

== Career ==
In 1975 he began teaching at the Complutense University of Madrid and in 1978 he was adjunct professor of civil law at the National University of Distance Education (UNED). In 1983 he obtained the chair of civil law at the University of Santiago de Compostela and in 1986, the chair of civil law at UNED, where he continued to teach until 2020.

In 1974 he joined the Madrid Bar Association as a lawyer, dedicating himself to civil and commercial law, especially in judicial procedures and arbitrations, both national and international, and from 1981 to 2005 he was part of the governing board of the Madrid Bar Association. In 2007 he was elected chairperson of the Madrid Bar Association. He was also elected vice president of the General Council of Spanish Lawyers and was a Member of Honor of the Illustrious and National Bar Association of Mexico.

In 2010 he was elected Member of the Royal Academy of Jurisprudence and Legislation, taking office in 2013. In 2011 he was appointed Doctor Honoris Causa by the Pontifical University of Comillas.

He was the president of the board of directors of the Nueva Mutua Sanitaria company.

He died in 2020 due to a sepsis.

== Awards ==
- Bachelor's Degree Extraordinary Award
- Doctorate Extraordinary Award
- Pelayo Award for Jurists of Recognized Prestige
- Doctor Honoris Causa by the Pontifical University of Comillas

== "Antonio Hernández-Gil" Young Lawyers Award ==
The “Antonio Hernández-Gil” Young Lawyers Award (Premio Jóvenes Abogados “Antonio Hernández-Gil”, in Spanish) was created in his honor (named after). It is a Spanish national legal award given by the General Council of Spanish Lawyers, which recognizes young lawyers in the practice of law.

The award was created by the General Council of Spanish Lawyers, the representative and executive body of all the Bar Associations of Spain, and the Bar Associations of Spain, in collaboration with the NMS Company. The aim of the award is to recognize the excellence of the young lawyers within the Spanish legal profession (practice of law).

== See also ==
- General Council of Spanish Lawyers
- "Antonio Hernández-Gil" Young Lawyers Award
