= Nerea Iráculis =

Basque lawyer, legal scholar and professor of law

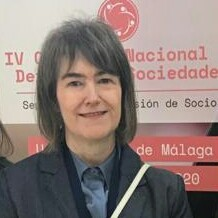
- Nerea Iráculis at the 4th Spanish Congress of Company Law (2020)
- Born: Nerea Iráculis Arregui; 17 December 1968 (age 57); Amorebieta-Etxano (Basque Country); Spain
- Education: University of the Basque Country (Lic., PhD)
- Occupations: Lawyer, legal scholar and professor

Nerea Iráculis Arregui (born in Amorebieta-Etxano on 17 December 1968) is a Basque lawyer, legal scholar, and professor of law.

She is currently a full professor of commercial law at the University of the Basque Country.

== Biography and career ==
Nerea Iráculis was born in Amorebieta-Etxano (Basque Country) on 17 December 1968. She studied a licenciate degree in law at the University of the Basque Country and graduated in 1991. Later she obtained a doctorate in law at the University of the Basque Country in 2008, with the thesis "Advertising of medicines for human use", directed by the Spanish full professor Alberto Emparanza Sobejano.

She practiced as a corporate lawyer for a few years, member of the Biscay Bar Association. In 1993 she began as a university professor of commercial law at the University of the Basque Country. She teaches in different law subjects, such as, advertising law, company law or commercial law. She is currently a full professor of commercial law at the University of the Basque Country.

She is an expert in commercial law, company law, competition law, EU competitipon law and transport law.

== Publications ==
=== Books ===
- 2024, Insolvency Law Lessons, University of the Basque Country
- 2020, Company Law Lessons, University of the Basque Country
- 2013, Conflicts of interest of the partner: dismissal of the administrator appointed by a competing shareholder, Marcial Pons
- 2012, The reform of the Advertising Law and unfair competition, Basque Summer University
- 2011, Securities: bill of exchange, check and promissory note, University of the Basque Country
- 2009, Medicines advertising, La Ley
- 2007, The unified legal regime of the commercial commission and the mandate in the Law of obligations and contracts, Dykinson
- 2006, Advertising Law Lessons, University of the Basque Country

=== Articles (selection) ===
- 2020, "Scope of the suppression or statutory modification of the right of separation due to lack of distribution of profits such as dividend and recognition of the right of separation in favor of the dissenting partner", Company Law Journal.
- 2019, "Agreements on operations with related parties: formulation of the "relevant" conflict in the prohibition of voting in the subsidiary company of the administrator appointed by the parent company", Company Law Journal.
- 2019, "The remuneration of the executive director (or chief executive officer): an integrative reading of articles 217 and 249 of the Capital Companies Law", Commercial Law Journal.

== See also ==
- Alberto Emparanza Sobejano
- José Manuel Martin Osante
- José Ignacio Cubero
