= Joseba Azkarraga =

Spanish politician

- Born: Joseba Mirena Azkarraga Rodero; 15 November 1950 (age 75); Salvatierra, Basque Country, Spain
- Occupations: Lawyer, activist, politician
- Political party: Basque Nationalist Party

Joseba Mirena Azkarraga Rodero (born in Salvatierra on 15 November 1950) is a Basque lawyer, activist and politician.

He served as Minister of Justice of the Basque Government in two legislatures (2001-2005 and 2005-2009). He has been also Secretary General of Eusko Alkartasuna, from 1987 to 1993 and again from 1998 to 2009. He was formerly member of the Basque Nationalist Party.

He has served as deputy (MP) in the first, third and fourth legislatures of the Congress of Deputies in Spain.

He is the spokesperson of the movement Sare.

== See also ==
- Idoia Otaegui
