= Patxi Juaristi =

Basque sociologist, linguist, writer and university professor

Vice-rector of the University of the Basque Country
- Incumbent
- Assumed office 2017

Director of Universities of the Basque Government
- In office 2005–2009
- Appointed by: Jose Antonio Campos Granados (Minister)
- President: Juan José Ibarretxe

Personal details
- Born: Francisco Juaristi Larrinaga; 13 April 1967 (age 59) Markina-Xemein (Basque Country); Spain
- Education: University of Deusto
- Occupation: Sociologist, linguist, writer and university professor

Francisco Juaristi Larrinaga (born in Markina-Xemein on 13 April 1967), known as Patxi Juaristi, is a Basque sociologist, linguist, writer and university professor, current vice-rector of the University of the Basque Country.

He is currently a full professor at the University of the Basque Country and director of the Gabriel Aresti Chair of Basque Studies at the University of the Basque Country. He is a corresponding academic of the Royal Academy of the Basque Language since 2013.

He previously held the position of Director of Universities of the Basque Government between 2005 and 2009.

== Biography and career ==
Patxi Juaristi was born in Markina-Xemein, Basque Country, on 13 April 1967. He studied a licentiate degree in sociology and political science in the University of Deusto. Later he obtained a doctorate in sociology at the University of Deusto in 1995, with the thesis "Ondasunekiko harremanak Justo Mokoroaren Repertorio de locuciones del habla popular vasca esaera bilduman", directed by the Basque sociologist Francisco Garmendia Agirrezabalaga.

Since 1993, he has been a university teacher of sociology and political science at the University of the Basque Country. Since 1999, he has been a full professor of political science and administration at the University of the Basque Country.

As a professor and researcher, his lines of research have focused mainly on the field of Basque culture, the Basque language, linguistics and the Spanish Civil War. In 2002, he received the Mikel Zarate essay prize awarded by the Royal Academy of the Basque Language for the book Euskal Herria globalizazioaren aurrean: XXI mendean eragina izango duten zenbait eragileren azterketa (Bilbao Bizkaia Kutxa, 2001). As a researcher he is a member of Euskobarómetro, the electoral analysis group of the University of the Basque Country.

From 2009 to 2016, he was a member of the Ethics Committee for Research with Human Beings (CEISH) of the University of the Basque Country. He was also a member of the Board of the Basque Association of Sociology and Political Science.

In 2013, he was named corresponding academic of the Royal Academy of the Basque Language for his study and research of the Basque language. As an academic, he belongs to the "Jagon" section of the Royal Academy of the Basque Language. He is also a member of the Basque Studies Society.

In 2017, he was appointed vice-rector of the University of the Basque Country, with Nekane Balluerka as rector of the university. He was also appointed member of the Advisory Committee for the Basque Language by the Basque Government, along with other members such as Juanjo Álvarez and Koikili Lertxundi.

In 2023, the University of the Basque Country created the Gabriel Aresti Chair of Basque Studies, with Juaristi being its director. He is also part of the team of the UNESCO Chair of Human Rights and Public Powers at the University of the Basque Country.

== Director of Universities ==
In 2005, Juaristi was appointed Director of Universities of the Basque Government, by the Regional Minister of Education, Universities and Research Jose Antonio Campos Granados. He was appointed as an independent professional (without political affiliation). He held the position during the VIII Legislature of the Basque Government (2005–2009). As Director of Universities, he had to deal with the so-called "Bologna process" and the adaptation of the entire Basque university system to it.

== Publications ==
=== Books ===
- Gerra Zibila Berriatuan eta Lekeitioko frontean: Berriatua Berrezarkuntzan, II Errepublican eta Gerra Zibilean, Universidad del País Vasco, 2014.
- Maiatzeko artoaren ardura eta bost seme-alaba dauzkana ez dago musika bila: euskaldunon postmaterialismoari buruzko gogoeta, Diputación Foral de Álava, 2010.
- Guerra Zibila, jendea da hila: "Guerra Zibilaren ondorioz hil ziren markinar eta xemeindarren omenez", Ayuntamiento de Marquina-Jeméin, 2008.
- Kontsumitzaileen eskubideak: aurrerapausoak, arrikuak eta konponbideak, Universidad de Deusto, 2005.
- Salgai: euskal kontsumo gizartea aztertzen, Alberdania, 2005.
- Gizarte ikerketarako teknikak: teoria eta adibideak, Universidad del País Vasco, 2003.
- Euskaldunak eta ondasunak, Pamiela, 2001.
- Euskal Herria globalizazioaren aurrean: XXI mendean eragina izango duten zenbait eragileren azterketa, Bilbao Bizkaia Kutxa, 2001.
- Euskal alfabetatzearen historia zenbait sortzaileren ahotan: (1960-1990), Labayru Ikastegia, 1997.
- Ondasunekiko harremanak Justo Mokoroaren Repertorio de locuciones del habla popular vasca esaera bilduman, Universidad de Deusto, 1996.
