= Lakua =

District of the city of Vitoria-Gasteiz, of the Basque Country, Spain

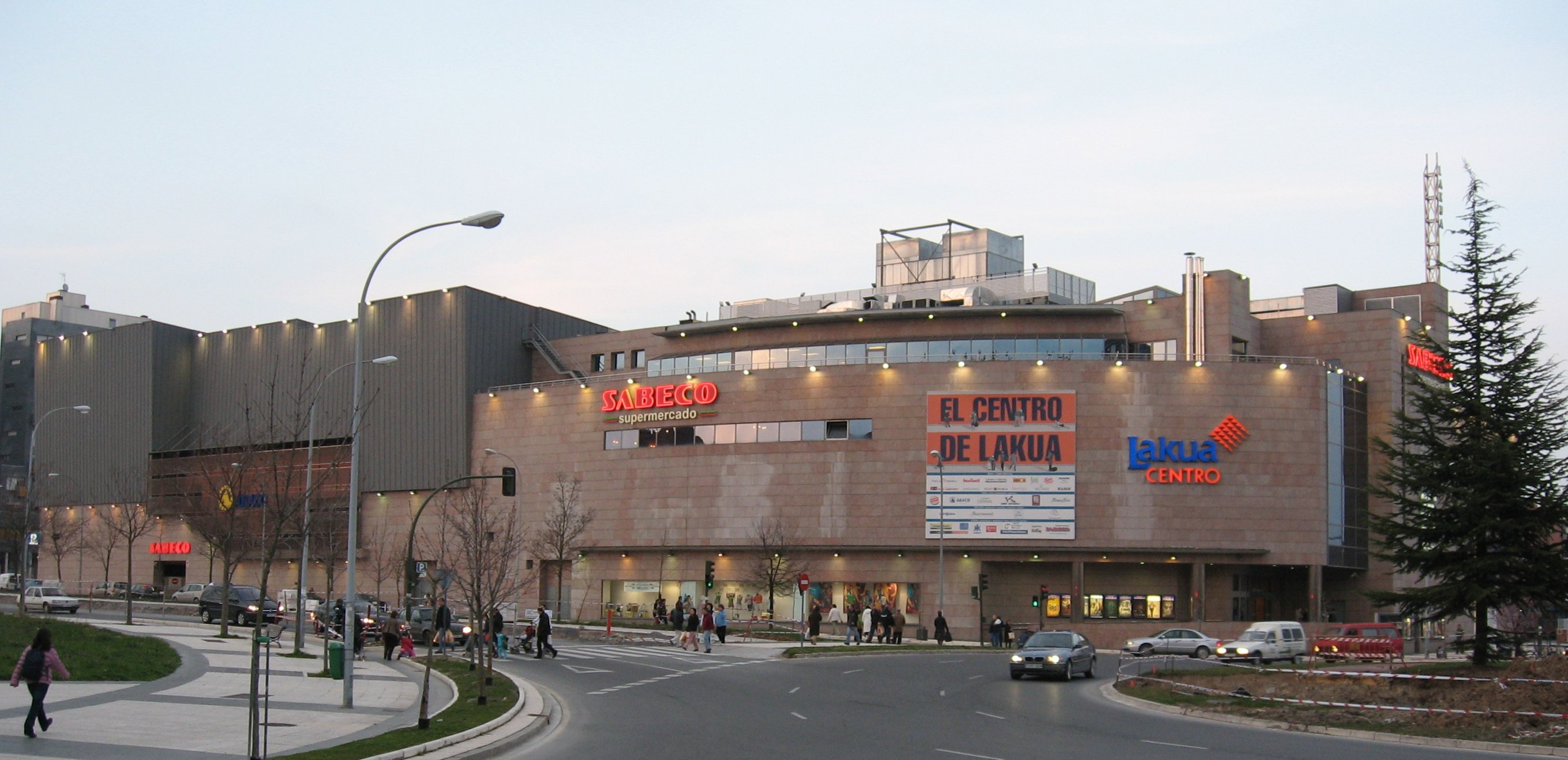
Commercial center of the district.

Lakua is a district of the city of Vitoria-Gasteiz, of the Basque Country, Spain.

== Context ==
Located at the north of the city, actually with more than 50,000 inhabitants, the biggest urban concentration of the capital of Alava. Lakua is divided in various subdistricts or neighbourhoods, which have their own personality in Lakua but they share an origin and a similar architecture. At demographic and estadistic level, the institutions divide the neighbourhood at two other subneighbourhoods: "Lakua- Arriaga" (Which would include the area from Arriaga to Lakuabizkarra) and "Lakua-Sansomendi" (Which would include Sansomendi, Ibaiondo and another part of Lakuabizkarra). In less than five years, Lakua's population is expected to be more than 70,000 inhabitants, because the neighbourhood can't be expanded more, but there are a lot of houses to be occupied.

== Limits of the district ==
- At the north with the Zadorra river, limiting the city of Vitoria from the neighbourhood of Abetxuko
- At the south with the city itself
- At the east with the Arriaga industrial area
- At the west with the Ali district

== Characteristics ==
The district occupies a great square at the north of the city, one-third of Vitoria's residential area. It started to get built in the early 1960s, with the industrial "boom" the city had. The city hall was obligated to make an urbanization plan, with the north of the city as the objective. Those quaggy terrains transformed at Lakua, which now doubles the inhabitants that Vitoria had.

== Lakua´s neighbourhoods ==
Actually, Lakua can be divided at 3 great areas

- Arriaga-Lakua: The first subdistrict to be made. It extends from the north to the Zadorra river. It is the east third of Lakua. There is the biggest park of the city, the "Arriaga park" and has 20,000 inhabitants.
- Lakuabizkarra: The part from the north of Blas de Otero and Antonio Machado streets until Ibaiondo. It is the newest part of the district. It has the biggest commercial park of the district: "centro Lakua". It also has 20,000 inhabitants.
- Lakua céntrica: From Antonio Machado and Blas de Otero streets to the south, without entering to Sansomendi. It has the Vasque Government's central. Here live 9,000 inhabitants.

== Transport ==
The inhabitants of Lakua can walk to the city centre in 20 minutes. 8 of the 17 Tuvisa public bus company's bus lines are in Lakua, which makes another way of moving through the city possible. In addition, the tramway of Vitoria can be used, because its Abetxuko line has stations at Lakua. Using this, you can get to the city centre in 10 minutes. Finally, there is a new bus station currently being built at Lakua céntrica.

== Educative centers ==
=== Child education ===
EMEI Lourdes Lejarreta c/ Blas de Otero z/g.

EMEI Gloria Fuertes c/ Gernikako Arbola z/g.

EMEI Lakuabizkarra c/ Baiona 14.

Txirrinbil Haurreskola Pza/ Ignacio Aldecoa.

Txantxangorri Haurreskola c/ Rio Ayuda, z/g.

Ibaiondo Haurreskola c/ Barcelona, 23.

=== Elementary education ===
CEP Umandi Ikastola c/ Francisco Javier de Landáburu, 9.

CEP Padre Orbiso c/ Francisco Javier de Landáburu, 7.

CEP Toki Eder c/ Duque de Wellington, 6.

CEP Ibaiondo c/ Tarragona, 9.

CEP A.Fornies-Manuel de Falla c/ Martin Susaeta, z/g.

CEP Lakuabizkarra c/ Miguel Hernández, 2.

CEP Ignacio Barrutia c/ Espoz y Mina, 4.

=== Secondary school ===
CPEIPS Calasancio c/ Paula Montal, 9 (Sansomendi).

CPEIPS San Prudencio c/ Duque de Wellington, 4.

IGS Mendebaldea c/ Donostia, 3.

=== Special education ===
CEE Gorbeialde c/ Blas de Otero, 2.
