= General Council of Spanish Lawyers =

Supreme body of the Spanish lawyers

- Consejo General de la Abogacía Española

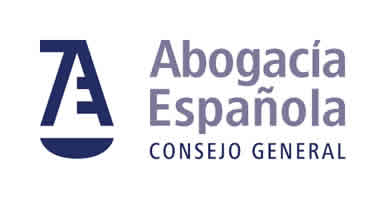
- Abbreviation: CGAE
- Formation: 1943; 83 years ago
- Type: Public law corporation (statutory corporation)
- Headquarters: Palacio del Marqués de Alcañices; Paseo de Recoletos, 13; Madrid (Spain)
- Members: 250,000 lawyers and 83 bar associations (2020)
- Chair: Victoria Ortega (since 2016)
- Vice-Chair: Carlos Fuentenebro (since 2016)
- Board of directors: 10 members, a general secretary, a treasurer, a vice president and the president
- Budget: € 13 million (2023)
- Employees: 100 (2022)
- Website: www.abogacia.es

The General Council of Spanish Lawyers (Spanish: Consejo General de la Abogacía Española) is the supreme representative and executive body of all the bar associations and lawyers of Spain.

It is a Spanish public law corporation (statutory corporation) that brings together the 83 bar associations of Spain and all lawyers in Spain (in Spain, it is mandatory for lawyers to be joined to a bar association).

The General Council of Spanish Lawyers represents the 83 Spanish bar associations and all the Spanish lawyers. The corporation is also member of the Spanish Council of State, represented by its chairperson.

The current chairperson is Victoria Ortega.

== History ==
After the Civil War and in a situation of organizational chaos, in the midst of a harsh economic and social crisis, the single party of the Spanish Falange carried out a process of purge and expulsion of lawyers disaffected by the new political regime. In the Madrid Bar Association, for example, between 1939 and 1951 the president was not directly elected by the members. In the forties the corporation participated in the creation of a body that would encompass all the Bar Associations in Spain, which materialized in 1943 with the creation of the General Council of Spanish Lawyers.

The General Council of Spanish Lawyers was launched in 1942, at the proposal of Emilio Laguna Azorín, at the time president of the Zaragoza Bar Association, the oldest bar association in Spain. The Francoist Ministry of Justice approved the legal provisions the following year. Specifically, it approves the Decree of June 19, 1943 by which the first corporation of bar associations is created, the General Council of the Illustrious Bar Associations of Spain, developed by Ministerial Order of October 14, 1943, a corporation more in a dictatorship that calls itself organic democracy. Throughout the Dictatorship, its operation is confused with that of the Madrid Bar Association, with which it shares the board of directors.

At the end of Francoism, the corporation also participated in the political turmoil of the moment, with an important participation of members of the anti-Franco opposition. The Francoist government even intervened in 1972 in the Madrid Bar Association to prevent candidacies for the Governing Board of political opponents such as Enrique Tierno Galván, Pablo Castellano or José María Gil-Robles, which led to the suspension of that year's elections. Pedrol Rius, who held the position of president from 1972 to 1992, adapted the institutions of the corporation to the new constitutional framework during the democratic Transition.

== Organization ==
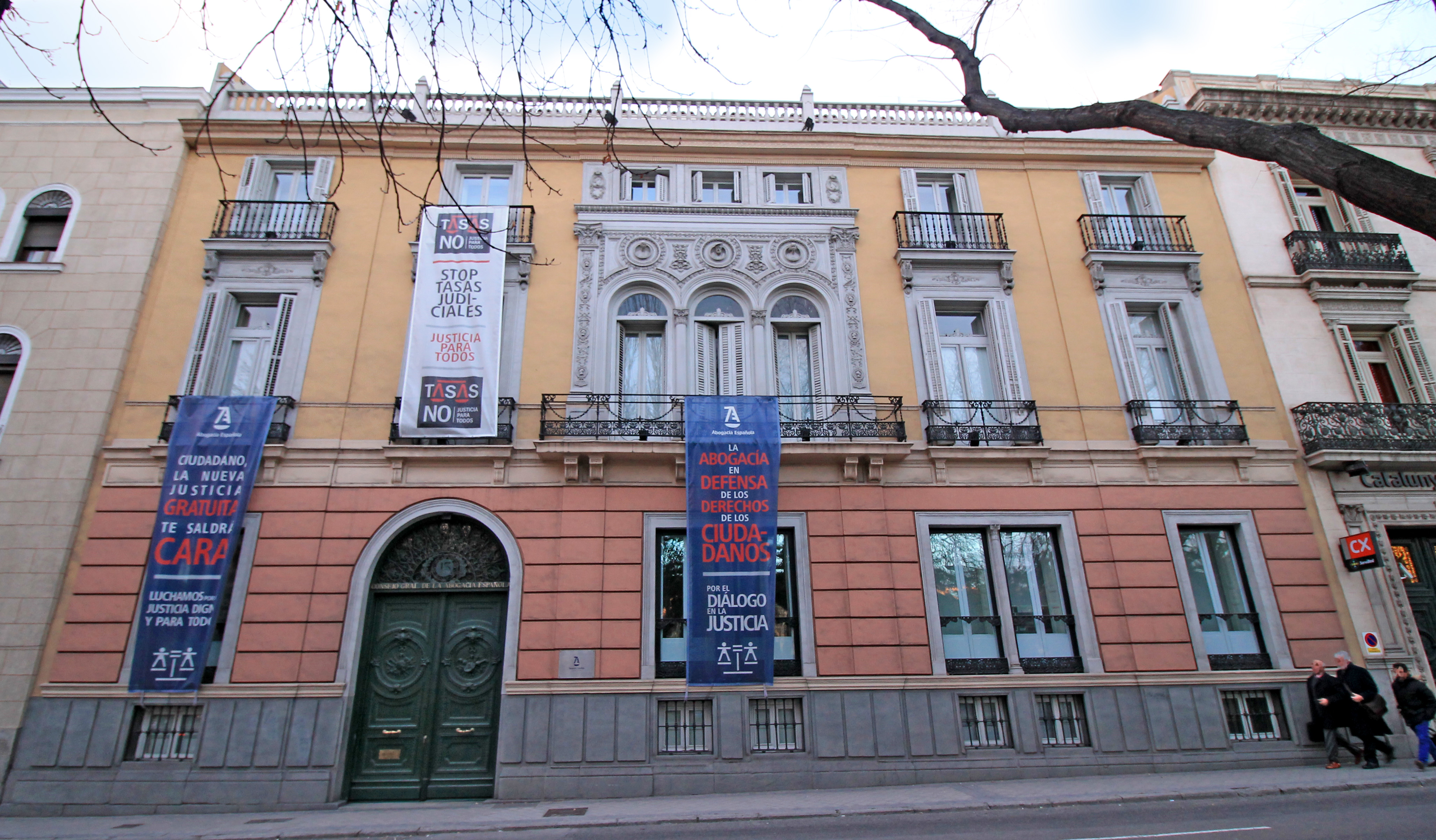
Palace of the Marquess of Alcañices (Madrid), headquarters of the General Council of the Spanish Lawyers

It is organized internally through a general assembly, made up of all the 83 bar associations, which is held at least once a year and elects by direct and secret vote, every five years, a governing board made up of ten members, one treasurer, a librarian, a secretary and governed by a president.

The main headquarters of the council is located in the Palace of the Marqués de Alcañices, at Paseo de Recoletos, 13, in Madrid.

According to General Council of Spanish Lawyers data, in 2020 there were around 250,000 registered lawyers throughout Spain (of which 154,000 were practicing registered lawyers and 95,000 non-practicing registered lawyers).

The General Council of Spanish Lawyers is the third pillar of the justice system in Spain:

- Judiciary: General Council of the Judiciary (CGPJ)
- Prosecution: Council of the Spanish Attorneys and the Spanish Attorney General
- Lawyers: General Council of Spanish Lawyers (CGAE)

== Functions ==
The General Council of the Spanish Legal Profession, the coordinating and executive representative body of the 83 Bar Associations, defends a Legal Profession based on values, free, independent, opinion leader, with social projection and at the forefront of the implementation of new technologies.

In addition to that, it defends lawyers, participates in the legislative process and decides on other issues such as the official shift, free justice,...

The CGAE is also the body in charge of bringing together all lawyers in the National Conference of Lawyers.

== Controversies ==
During the years 2020 and 2022, a great controversy arose in relation to the remuneration and allowances of the Board's directors.

== Chairpersons ==
- Antonio Goicoechea 1943-1952
- Manuel Escobedo Duato 1952-1959
- Vicente Gella 1959-1964
- José Luis del Valle Iturriaga 1964-1972
- Antonio Pedrol Rius 1973-1992
- Eugenio Gay Montalvo 1992-2001
- Carlos Carnicer Díez 2001-2016
- Victoria Ortega Benito 2016-

== See also ==
- Spanish Council of State
- Antonio Hernández-Gil Young Lawyers Award

== Bibliography ==
- Barabino, José Mario (2014). Nueva reseña histórica del Ilustre Colegio de Abogados de Madrid. Valencia: Tirant Lo Blanch. OCLC 881223133.
- García Venero, Maximiano (1971). Orígenes y vida del Ilustre Colegio de Abogados de Madrid (Derecho, Foro, Política). Madrid: Ilustre Colegio de Abogados de Madrid.
- Pérez-Bustamante, Rogelio (1996). El Ilustre Colegio de Abogados de Madrid. Madrid: Ilustre Colegio de Abogados de Madrid. ISBN 84-921639-0-9.
- Prada, José Manuel (2014). «Lo que pudo ser y no fue: homenaje a Carmen López Bonilla». Otrosí. pp. 37–39. Archivado desde el original el 15 de febrero de 2016. Consultado el 6 de mayo de 2015.
- Tormo, Carlos (2004). El Colegio de Abogados de Valencia: entre el Antiguo Régimen y el Liberalismo. Valencia: Universidad de Valencia. ISBN 84-370-6011-7.
