= María López Belloso =

Basque lawyer, jurist, human rights activist and writer

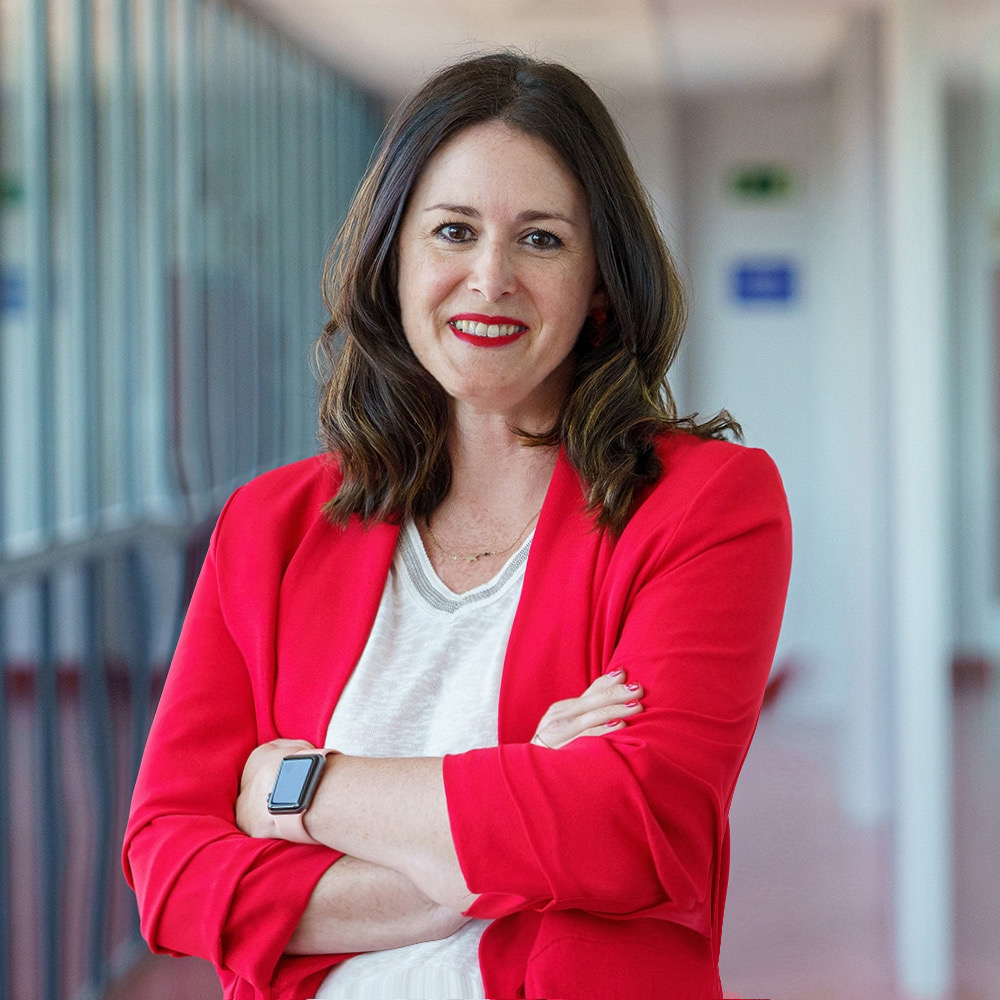
- María López Belloso
- Born: María López Belloso; 1979 (age 46–47); Santurtzi (Basque Country); Spain
- Education: University of Deusto (BA, MA, PhD); University of the Basque Country (PG)
- Occupations: Lawyer, jurist, human rights activist and writer
- Employer(s): University of the Basque Country; University of Deusto

María López Belloso (Santurtzi, 1979) is a Basque lawyer, jurist, human rights activist and writer.

She specializes in human rights, international humanitarian law and international law. She is also specialized in Western Sahara region. She is also an activist for women's rights and gender equality.

== Biography and career ==
María López Belloso was born in Santurtzi (Basque Country) in 1979. She studied a licenciate degree in law at the University of Deusto (1997–2002). She later obtained a master's degree in international humanitarian action (NOHA) at the University of Deusto (2002–2003), and a postgraduate degree in public international law at the University of the Basque Country (2003–2005).

She obtained her doctorate in law and human rights at the University of Deusto in 2017 with the thesis "The processes of truth, justice and reparation for victims of forced disappearance in the Western Sahara conflict", directed by Carlos Martín Beristain and Felipe Gomez Isa. In 2018 she was awarded the Brunet Prize for the best doctoral thesis on human rights, awarded by the Jaime Brunet Foundation.

She specializes in human rights, international humanitarian law and international law. She is also specialized in Western Sahara region.

Between 2005 and 2009 she was a researcher in the field of human rights at the University of the Basque Country and the HEGOA Institute for Development and International Cooperation Studies. She was also a university teacher of Public International Law at the University of the Basque Country until 2012.

In 2018 she was a speaker at the International Congress on Human Rights, together with the computer scientist Borja Sanz Urquijo, with the conference "Hic Sunt draconis: Human Rights and Big data, analysis of an unexplored collaboration", on the effect that big data and artificial intelligence (AI) can have on human rights. For that conference, López and Sanz received the ICHR Award for the best conference on human rights.

She is currently a researcher and university teacher at the University of Deusto. She specializes in the challenges that artificial intelligence (AI) can bring to human rights.

She is currently part of the EU project Gearing Roles (Gender Equality Actions in Research Institutions to transform Gender ROLES), on the equality of men and women in the university environment, equality plans and the situation of women in teaching and research.

== Publications ==
=== Books ===
- Guide for incorporating the gender perspective in teaching and research, 2021.
- Truth, justice and reparation processes for victims of forced disappearance in Western Sahara, 2019.
- Local human development: from theory to practice: the cases of sugar conversion in Holguín (Cuba) and the Sahrawi camps of Tindouf, 2011.

=== Book chapters ===
- "Equality policies in universities", in Gender and politics: new lines of analysis in the face of the fourth feminist wave, 2022.
- "Feminism and decentralized cooperation: the experience of the National Union of Sahrawi Women and the Basque Support Network for the UNMS", in Sahrawi Women: Three Tuizas for the memory of the resistance, 2016.
- "Right to active and passive suffrage in elections in the European Parliament", in The Charter of Fundamental Rights of the European Union and its reflection in the Spanish legal system, 2014.
- "Feminism and decentralized cooperation: experience of the National Union of Sahrawi Women and the Basque Support Network for the UNMS", in Cooperation and local human development: challenges from gender equality and social participation, 2011.

=== Academic articles ===
- "The contribution of data to feminist transformation of women’s rights to health", Feminismo/s, 2023.
- "Navigating the pandemic: Gendered perspectives on vulnerability, resilience and institutional change", Papers: revista de sociología, 2023.
- "Identidad, memorias y nuevas tecnologías", Civitas Europa: revista jurídica sobre la evolución de la nación y del estado en Europa, 2022.
- "The Western Sahara Conflict: impact on Sahrawi people´s human rights: intended solidarity or breach of international responsibility", Spanish yearbook of international law, 2022.
- "New technologies for the promotion and defense of human rights", Revista española de derecho internacional, 2021.
- "The role of European institutions in the defense of human rights in the Western Sahara", Estudios de Deusto: revista de Derecho Público, 2016.
- "Migration and vulnerability: Challenges, implications and difficulties faced by the sahrawi migrant population", The Age of Human Rights Journal, 2016.

=== Other articles and opinion ===
- "Vicarious violence: the difficulties of detecting one of the cruelest forms of mistreatment of women", The Conversation, 2023.
- "Trabajo social e inteligencia artificial: ¿amenaza u oportunidad?", The Conversation, 2023.
- "En el conflicto con España, Argelia tiene el derecho internacional de su parte", Público, 2022.
- "Claves para entender la decisión de España sobre el Sáhara: ¿qué y quién está detrás?", Ethics, 2022.
