= Antonio Hernández-Gil Young Lawyers Award =

Legal award

- Premio Jóvenes Abogados Antonio Hernández-Gil
- Type: Legal award
- Description: to recognize the excellence of the young lawyers within the Spanish legal profession
- Country: Spain
- Presented by: General Council of Spanish Lawyers; Bar Associations of Spain
- Eligibility: Lawyers

The Antonio Hernández-Gil Young Lawyers Award (Spanish: Premio Jóvenes Abogados Antonio Hernández-Gil) is a Spanish national legal award given by the General Council of Spanish Lawyers, which recognizes young lawyers in the practice of law.

== The award ==
The award was created by the General Council of Spanish Lawyers, the representative and executive body of all the Bar Associations of Spain, and the Bar Associations of Spain, in collaboration with the NMS Company. The aim of the award is to recognize the excellence of the young lawyers within the Spanish legal profession.

The award is named after the Spanish lawyer, businessperson, legal scholar, and university full professor Antonio Hernández-Gil Álvarez-Cienfuegos. To be a candidate for the Young Lawyers Award, one is required to be in possession of the lawyer's title (lawyer license), to be a member of a Spanish Bar Association, and to practice as a lawyer. It takes into account having an excellent track record in their training, and an excellent knowledge of the law and the practice of law.

In 2021, seventeen young lawyers from all over Spain were recognized with the award. In the year 2022, sixteen young lawyers from all over Spain were recognized with this national award.

According to General Council of Spanish Lawyers data, in 2020 there were around 250,000 registered lawyers throughout Spain (of which 154,000 were practicing registered lawyers and 95,000 non-practicing registered lawyers).

== See also ==
- List of legal awards
- Prix du meilleur jeune économiste de France
- General Council of Spanish Lawyers
