= Fernando Rodríguez Doval =

Mexican politician (born 1980)

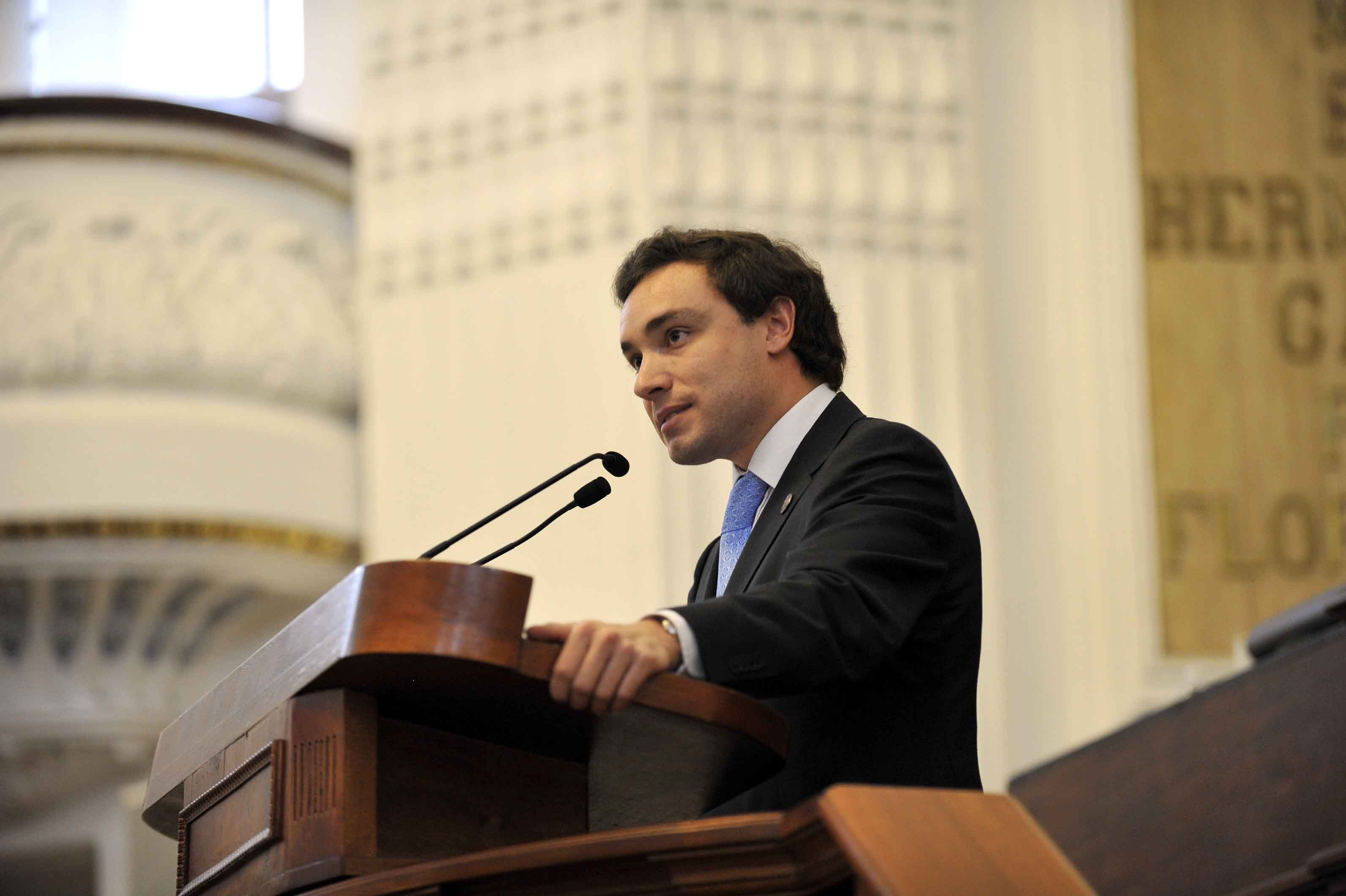
- Doval in 2012
- Born: 29 April 1980 (age 46); Mexico City, Mexico
- Occupation: Deputy
- Political party: PAN
- Website: http://www.fernando.org.mx/

Fernando Rodríguez Doval (born 29 April 1980) is a Mexican politician affiliated with the PAN. As of 2013 he served as Deputy of the LXII Legislature of the Mexican Congress representing the Federal District.
