= Jonan Fernández =

Basque activist and politician

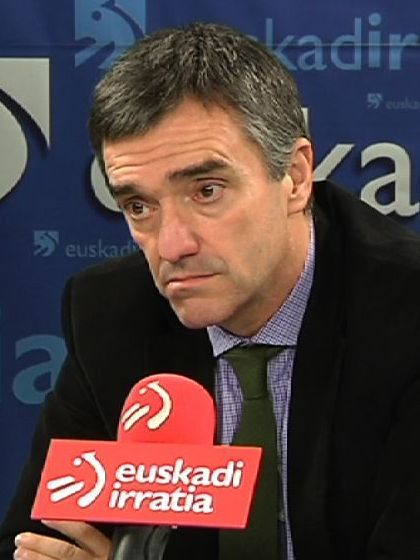
- Jonan Fernández in 2014

Secretary General for Social Transition and Agenda 2030 of the Basque Government
- In office 2021–2024
- President: Iñigo Urkullu

Secretary General for Human Rights, Coexistence and Cooperation of the Basque Government
- In office 2017–2020
- President: Iñigo Urkullu

General Secretary for Peace and Coexistence of the Basque Government
- In office 2013–2017
- President: Iñigo Urkullu

Councillor of the Tolosa City Council
- In office 1987–1991

Personal details
- Born: Jonan Fernández Erdozia; 21 March 1962 (age 64) Tolosa (Basque Country); Spain
- Occupation: Politician

Jonan Fernández Erdozia (Tolosa, 21 March 1962) is a Basque activist and politician.

He currently holds the position of Secretary General for Social Transition and Agenda 2030 of the Basque Government from 2021.

He previously held the positions of Secretary General for Human Rights, Coexistence and Cooperation of the Basque Government (from 2017 to 2020), General Secretary for Peace and Coexistence of the Basque Government (from 2013 to 2017) and Councillor of the City Hall of Tolosa between 1987 and 1991.

== Biography and career ==
Jonan Fernández was born in Tolosa, Basque Country, in 1962.

Between 1985 and 1992 he was coordinator and spokesperson for Lurraldea, an association that opposed the layout of the Leitzaran highway. Between 1987 and 1991 he was a councilor of the Tolosa City Council for the Herri Batasuna political party. Upon resigning as councilor, he left Herri Batasuna.

In December 1992 he founded Elkarri, a social movement that actively worked for non-violence, human rights, dialogue, pluralism and peace in the Basque Country. For 14 years (until 2006) he was its general coordinator. This movement had 1,200 active members in the Basque Country and Navarra, as well as 3,500 financial contributors. In addition to organizing various campaigns such as massive demonstrations in Bilbao and signature campaigns, Elkarri created a party table and organized two Peace Conferences. After its dissolution, Elkarri gave way to a new organization, Lokarri.

After the disappearance of Elkarri, Jonan Fernández created Baketik, a foundation dedicated to promoting processes of personal, educational, coexistence, organizational or social transformation with an ethical sense. He was its director until January 2013, after his appointment to a position in the Basque Government.

== Positions in the Basque Government ==
In 2013 Fernández was appointed Secretary General for Peace and Coexistence of the Basque Government by the head of government Iñigo Urkullu. In 2017 was appointed Secretary General for Human Rights, Coexistence and Cooperation of the Basque Government.

In 2020 was appointed personal cabinet advisor to the president of the government. During the COVID-19 pandemic, Fernández was at the head of the advisory committee that established the health measures that should be implemented in the Basque Country.

In 2021 was appointed Secretary General for Social Transition and Agenda 2030 of the Basque Government by Iñigo Urkullu, position he currently helds.

== Publications ==
- Ser humano en los conflictos. Una reflexión ética tras una vivencia directa en el conflicto vasco. Alianza Editorial. Madrid. 2006.
- Vivir y convivir. Cuatro aprendizajes básicos. Alianza Editorial. Madrid. 2008.
- Educar en ser persona. Ocho aprendizajes. Baketik. Oñati. 2010.
- Ni tanto ni tan poco. Una conclusión inacabada a los 50. Erein. Donostia. 2013.
