= Juan de Dios Doval Mateo =

Spanish politician (1943 - 1980)

Juan de Dios Doval Mateo (1943 in Madrid – 1980 in San Sebastián). He was a politician and professor at the Law Faculty of San Sebastian who was assassinated by the Basque separatist group ETA.

== Biography ==
Juan de Dios Doval Matthew was killed in San Sebastian on October 31, 1980. Seven days after the killing of Jaime Arrese. Juan de Dios Doval, 37 years old, was a Professor of the UPV/EHU Faculty of Law of San Sebastian. Also, he was a member of the Executive Committee of UCD in Guipuzcoa and occupied the second place in the list of his political party in the elections to the Basque Parliament. He was married with two children.

== Death ==
Minutes before 9:00 a.m. on October 31, 1980, Juan de Dios left his home and drove to the Faculty of Law, where he worked as a teacher. Once he was in his car, a blue Simca 1200, two young men without masks and armed with pistols approached Juan de Dios. One of them pulled a gun out of his anorak and shot him several times. Three shots hit Juan de Dios and they run away. An ambulance moved the victim to the health residence of the Social Security Our Lady of Aranzazu. He was dead on arrival.

The Jesuit priest Antonio Beristain, Doval's companion at the University, told Gaceta Universitaria that Doval told his secretary on the eve of his death: "Pray for me." She recommended him to abandon, but he replied: " I don't want to make my children think that I am a coward." The day after his assassination, the activity of the Faculty of Law stopped and about 300 students and teachers silently marched from the faculty to the Provincial Council of Guipuzcoa.

The killers had stolen a car at gunpoint around 8:30. Two assailants boarded the vehicle, leaving one of them in the back with its owner, who had been forced to move. The owner was chained in a field of the capital, but not before they warned him to not alert the police until three hours later.

=== Trial ===
The same day the attack took place, ETA political-military claimed responsibility for it in a statement. In regards to the perpetrators, the only information known is that the two accused, José María Salegui Zuloaga and Luis Francisco Amezaga Mendizábal, were acquitted by the National Court in 1982. There is an absence of sentence for the killing of Juan de Dios.

=== Writing ===
La revisión civil (1979).

== Bibliography ==
- MERINO, A., CHAPA, A., Raíces de Libertad. pp. 71–83. FPEV (2011). ISBN 978-84-615-0648-4 (in spanish)
- This article makes use of material translated from the corresponding article in the Spanish-language Wikipedia.
