= Biscay Bar Association =

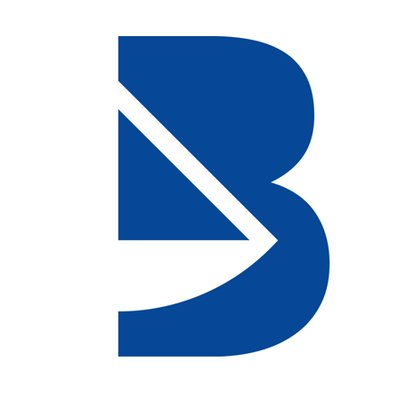
- Formation: 1838
- Legal status: Spanish public law corporation, professional association
- Purpose: Governing the lawyers of Biscay
- Headquarters: Bilbao (Spain)
- Region served: Biscay (Spain)
- Members: 4846 (2020)
- Official language: Spanish and Basque
- Chairperson: Carlos Fuentenebro
- Main organ: Government Board and General Meeting
- Website: www.icabizkaia.eus

The Biscay Bar Association (officially Ilustre Colegio de la Abogacía de Bizkaia, in Spanish, and Bizkaiko Abokatuen Elkargo Ohoretsua, in Basque) is a Spanish public law corporation and professional association that groups, represents, governs and defends the lawyers of Biscay.

It is the professional association in Biscay to which lawyers must be joined in order to practice law. Its headquarters are in Bilbao.

== The institution ==
The Biscay Bar Association was founded on July 11, 1838, in the Bilbao City Council by call of Don José Javier de Goytia who was the first Dean of the professional association, for being the oldest lawyer in the town.

The Biscay Bar Association is the governing body of all the associated lawyers in the circumscript of exercise of this professional association (Biscay) and has its headquarters in Bilbao. The current chairperson of the institution is Carlos Fuentenebro.

In Spain, in order for lawyers to practice law they must be in possession of the Professional Title of Lawyer (Título Profesional de Abogado), to get the title it is necessary to have a bachelor's degree in Law, a master's degree in Law and to pass the State Exam of Lawyers.

== Chairpersons of the Biscay Bar Association ==
- Carlos Fuentenebro (2013-)
- Nazario De Oleaga Páramo (2003-2013)
- Carlos Suárez González (1988-1998)

== See also ==
- Constitutional Court of Spain
- Supreme Court of Spain
