= Thomson Reuters Aranzadi =

Spanish publisher

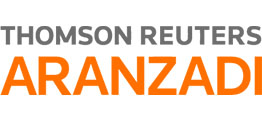
- Parent company: Thomson Reuters
- Founded: 1929; 97 years ago
- Country of origin: Spain
- Headquarters location: Cizur Menor (Navarre) Madrid Barcelona
- Owner: Thomson Reuters Spain
- Official website: www.thomsonreuters.es

Thomson Reuters Aranzadi (also called Aranzadi-Thomson Reuters or simply Aranzadi) is a Spanish publishing company, part of Thomson Reuters Spain. It has its headquarters in Cizur Menor (Navarre).

It is the leading publisher of law and social and legal sciences in Spain. It is part of the multinational company Thomson Reuters (through its Spanish subsidiary Thomson Reuters Spain).

Its official name has been Editorial Aranzadi (1929-1999), Editorial Thomson Aranzadi (1999-2008) and Thomson Reuters Aranzadi (2008–present).

== History ==
Editorial Aranzadi (Editorial Aranzadi, SA) was created in 1929 as a family business, in Navarra (Spain), by the Spanish lawyer and politician Manuel Aranzadi. Since its creation, it has become the most important legal publisher in Spain, a leading Spanish company in legal publications.

In 1999, Editorial Aranzadi was acquired by the multinational The Thomson Corporation, which in that year had a turnover of 7,000 million pesetas (42 million euros).

In 2008, The Thomson Corporation bought the Reuters company, giving rise to the current Thomson Reuters. With this, the Spanish publisher was renamed Editorial Thomson Reuters Aranzadi.

According to the rankings, including the SPI ranking (Scholarly Publishers Indicators) and the ranking of the Higher Council for Scientific Research (CSIC), the Thomson Reuters Aranzadi publishing house is the first leading publisher in Law and Social and Legal Sciences in Spain and the third in Humanities and Social Sciences in general in Spain (after Grupo Anaya).

Thomson Reuters Aranzadi has collaboration agreements with legal institutions such as the Madrid Bar Association (ICAM), the Spanish Confederation of Young Lawyers (CEAJ) and others.

== Imprints ==
Within the Thomson Reuters Aranzadi publishing house are: Thomson Reuters Aranzadi (publisher), Thomson Reuters Aranzadi Formation, Aranzadi Digital, Aranzadi One, Aranzadi Fusión, Legal One, HighQ, etc.

It also owns and publishes various academic journals (Revista Aranzadi Doctrinal, Revista Española de Derecho Administrativo, Revista Unión Europea Aranzadi...).
