= Basque Government =

Government body in Spain

- Eusko Jaurlaritza; Gobierno Vasco; Gouvernement Basque

Overview
- Established: Consejo General Vasco (1978-80); Gobierno de Euzkadi (1936-79)
- Polity: Basque Country
- Leader: Lehendakari
- Appointed by: King of Spain
- Responsible to: Basque Parliament
- Annual budget: €11.75 billion (2020)
- Headquarters: Vitoria-Gasteiz
- Website: www.euskadi.eus

The Basque Government (Basque: Eusko Jaurlaritza, Spanish: Gobierno Vasco; French: Gouvernement Basque) is the governing body of the Basque Autonomous Community of Spain. The head of the Basque government is known as the Lehendakari. The Lehendakari is appointed by the Basque Parliament every four years, after a regional election. Its headquarters are located in the Lakua district of Vitoria-Gasteiz in Araba.

The first Basque Government was created after the approval of the first Basque Statute of Autonomy on 1 October 1936, in the midst of the Spanish Civil War. It was headed by José Antonio Aguirre (EAJ-PNV) and was supported by a coalition of all the parties that fought the Nationalist forces in the Civil War: those comprising the Popular Front (PSOE, PCE, EAE-ANV and other parties that sided with the Second Spanish Republic). After the defeat of the Republic, the Basque Government survived in exile, chaired by Jesús María Leizaola after the death of Aguirre in 1960. This first Basque Government was formally disbanded after the approval of the current Statute of Autonomy in 1979, after the death of caudillo Francisco Franco.

Upon approval of the new Statute, the new Basque Government was created (1980), superseding the Basque General Council. Carlos Garaikoetxea was the first lehendakari of the new Government.

== Current composition ==
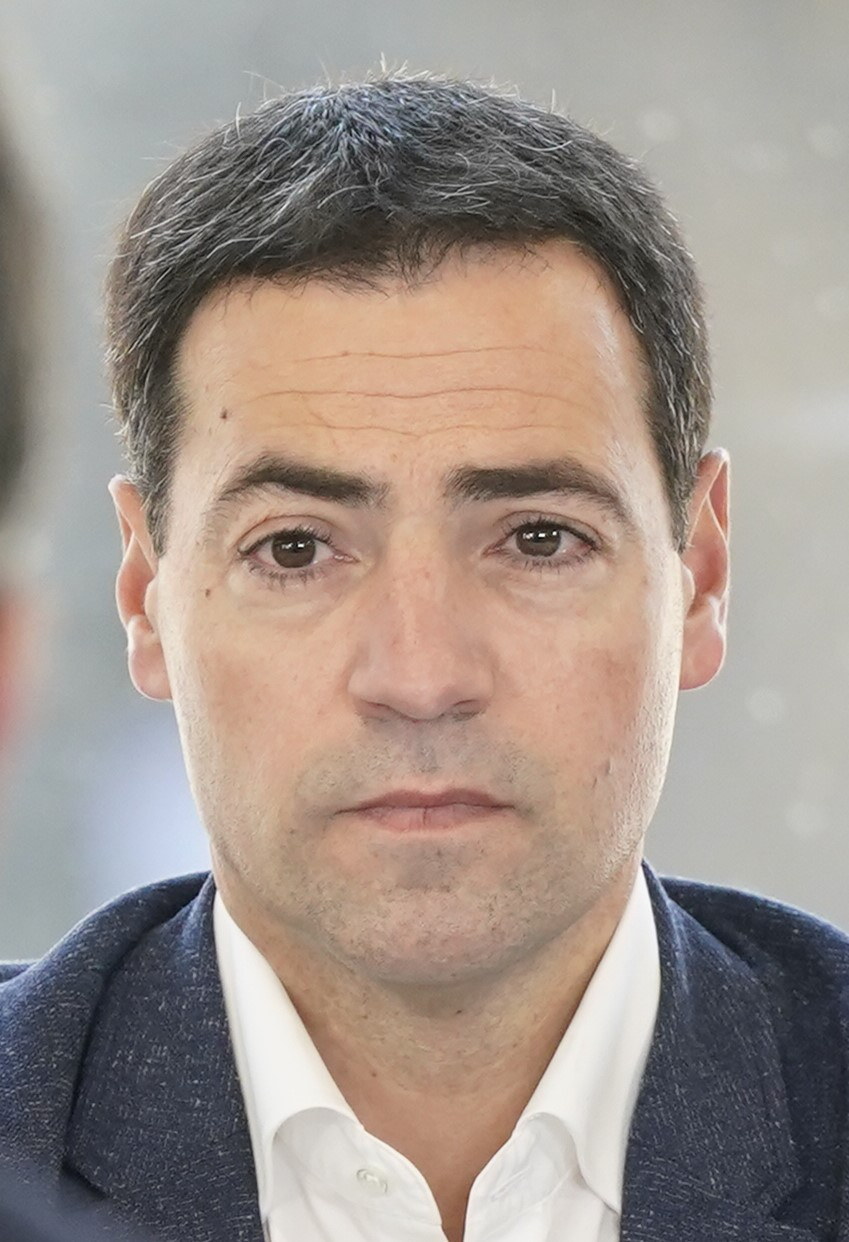
Imanol Pradales (EAJ-PNV), the current Lehendakari.

During the current legislative term, the Basque Government is chaired by Imanol Pradales, member of the Basque Nationalist Party, thanks to a government agreement with the Basque Socialist Party-Basque Left Party (PSE-EE). Urkullu got the back up of 39 parliamentarians (27 from the PNV and 12 from the PSE-EE) in his inauguration speech that took place in June 2024.

The composition of the Basque Government is established by the President of the Basque Country, also referred in Euskera as Lehendakari, who selects the counselors that will lead each of the Government departments. During the current legislative term the Government is composed of fifteen departments: Culture and Language Policy; Economy, Labour and Employment; Treasury and Finance; Governance, Digital Administration and Self-Government; Industry, Energy Transition and Sustainability; Security; Education; Housing and Urban Agenda; Health; Welfare, Youth and the Demographic Challenge; Sustainable Mobility; Science, Universities and Innovation; Tourism, Trade and Consumer Affairs; Food, Rural Development, Agriculture and Fisheries; and Justice and Human Rights. It has 78,000 employees.

== List of powers ==
Power held by the Basque country include but are not limited to:

=== Politics, bureaucracy and justice ===
- Basque Country statistics.
- Economic planning.
- Internal trade.
- Justice (as determined by the Organic Laws of Judiciary and of the General Council of the Judiciary), excluding military justice.
- Autonomous police force.

=== Finance ===
- Co-operatives, Mutual Benefit Societies (not owned by Social Security).
- Banks (under state monetary policy).

=== Industry ===
- Public sector.
- Planning of inland territory and coastline, town planning and housing.
- Woodland and forestry.
- Agriculture and livestock.
- Fishing inland.
- Pharmaceutical control.
- Scientific research.
- Professional associations
- Casinos, gaming, betting, except for the national system of wagers for sporting charities.

=== Infrastructure ===
- Hydraulic projects, canals and irrigation schemes when the waters flow, in their entirety, within the Basque Country
- Distribution and transport of energy used within the Basque country only.
- Railways, transport by land, sea, river and cable, ports, heliports, airports.
- Community development.

=== Health and social ===
- Health
- Social welfare work.

=== Education ===
- Responsibility for all education

=== Culture ===
- Culture
- Responsibility for Basque and Spanish languages
- Independent television, radio and press.
- Fine Arts institutions
- Historical, artistic, monumental, archeological and scientific heritage.
- Archives, Libraries and Museums not owned by the state.
- Tourism, sport, leisure and entertainment.
- Public performances.

== Historic administrations ==
- Garaikoetxea I (1980-1984)
- Garaikoetxea II (1984-1985)
- Ardanza I (1985-1987)
- Ardanza II (1987-1991)
- Ardanza III (1991-1995)
- Ardanza IV (1995-1999)
- Ibarretxe I (1999-2001)
- Ibarretxe II (2001-2005)
- Ibarretxe III (2005-2009)
- López (2009-2012)
- Urkullu I (2012-2016)
- Urkullu II (2016-2020)
- Urkullu III (2020-2024)

== See also ==
- List of Basque Presidents
- Basque Parliament
- Basque Republic
- Government of Navarre
- Communauté d'agglomération du Pays Basque
