= Coat of arms of Navarre =

- Adopted: 1981
- Crest: Spanish Royal crown
- Shield: Gules, a cross, saltire and orle of chains linked together or, in the fess point an emerald vert

The coat of arms of Navarre is the heraldic emblem which for centuries has been used in Navarre. It was adopted as one of the official symbols of the Chartered Community of Navarre and is regulated by Foral Law 24/2003. It is commonly used by Navarrese municipalities in their own arms.

== History ==
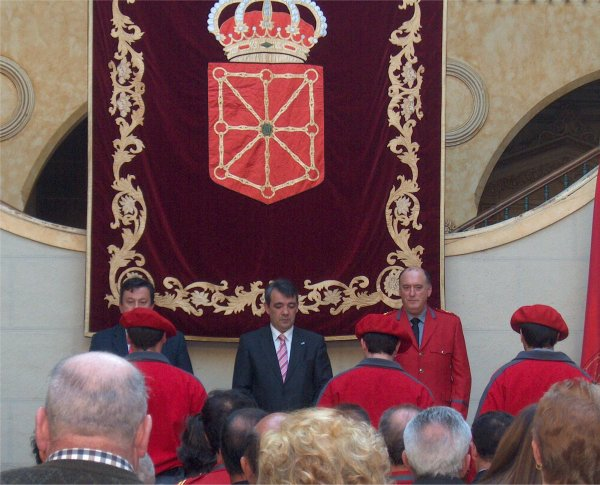
Coat of arms on display

An early appearance of the symbol was in a seal of Theobald I of Navarre. This design may have been based on the heraldic carbuncle symbol of eight radially arranged rods.

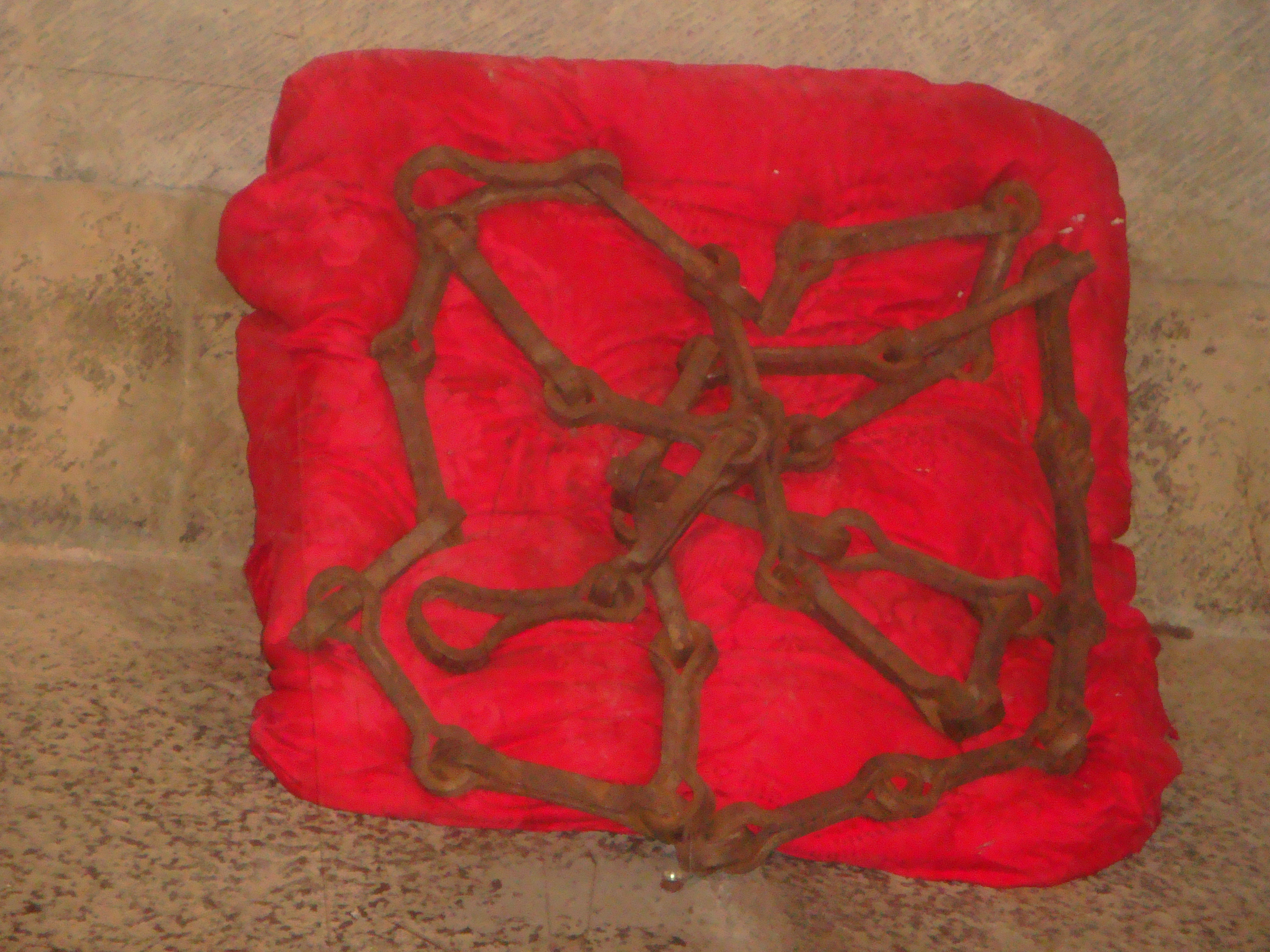
Chains found in a Roncesvalles church said to inspire the coat of arms of Navarre. Photographed at the Museum of Roncesvalles

By the 15th century, the mythology of the coat of arms would trace its origin back to the Battle of Las Navas de Tolosa in 1212 involving Sancho VII of Navarre, where the cavalry broke the chains of the caliph's slave-warriors and captured an emerald, among other prizes. Following the Spanish conquest of Iberian Navarre in 1512, the coat of arms of Navarre was incorporated into the coat of arms of Spain, and it is currently positioned as the fourth quarter.

From 1589, when Henry III of Navarre also became King of France, to the French revolution in 1792, the royal arms of France also used the arms of Navarre. The arms are now part of those used by the French department of Pyrénées-Atlantiques.

The coat of arms of the Basque Country adopted in 1936 included the arms of Navarre in the fourth quarter, but these were soon suppressed by Franco. Following his death, they were revived, but following a legal suit by the Navarre government claiming that the usage of the arms of a region on the flag of another was illegal, in 1986 the Constitutional Court of Spain forced the Basque government to remove the chains of Navarre, leaving the red background. The arms remain in the unofficial Zazpiak Bat.

== Gallery ==
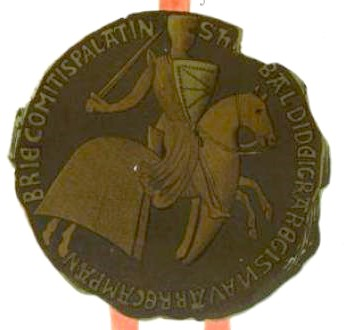
Seal of Theobald I
(13th century)

Early standard of the Kings of Navarre
(c. 1212)

Arms of Navarre
(16th century)

Arms of Navarre
(17th–19th centuries)

The current coat of arms of Spain

The royal coat of arms of France and Navarre (1589–1792)

The coat of arms of the French department of Pyrénées-Atlantiques

Coat of arms of Lower Navarre

The plain red fourth quarter of the Basque arms once showed the linked chains of Navarre

== Official model ==
In 1910, the Diputación Foral of Navarre approved the first official design of the coat of arms of Navarre. The event coincided with the celebration of the seven hundredth anniversary of the Battle of Las Navas de Tolosa to a legend whose origin attributed the origin of the chains of the coat of arms.

The agreement stated:

El escudo de armas de Navarra tiene como elementos esenciales, según tradición constante, cadenas de oro sobre fondo de gules con una esmeralda en el centro de unión de los ocho brazos de eslabones. (The coat of arms of Navarre contains as essential elements, according to constant tradition, gold chains on a gules background with an emerald in the center of union of the eight arms of links.)

— Agreement of 22 January 1910

The agreement included a picture with the coat of arms with a royal crown from which nothing said the text of the agreement, but that was the purpose of the first amendment in 1931, two months after the proclamation of the Second Spanish Republic. On July 8 of that year, the Diputación Foral agreed to replace the royal crown by a mural crown, in the same way as had been done with the coat of arms of Spain.

Six years later, after the start of the Spanish Civil War, the mural crown was again replaced by the royal crown (2 April 1931). A few months later, Francisco Franco signed a decree (BOE of 14 November) that handed to the province of Navarre the Laureate Cross of San Fernando in recognition of their help in the War. The Diputación was quick to adapt the coat of arms model to the new element and, as in previous cases, the agreement included a picture. After the Francoist regime, the Laureate Cross of San Fernando was removed, causing great controversy between supporters and opponents of withdrawal.

In 1981, the Parlament Foral of Navarre drafted a text that largely recovers the agreement of 1910.

“The coat of arms of Navarre consists of gold chains on a red background, with an emerald in the centre of the nexus between its eight arms of links and, above them, the Royal Crown, the symbol of the Ancient Kingdom of Navarre”.

— Article 7.1 of the Ley Orgánica de Reintegración y Amejoramiento del Régimen Foral de Navarra (LORAFNA), of 10 August 1982

The agreement was reproduced in "Law of Reintegration and Improvement of the Foral Regime of Navarre" (LORAFNA), the equivalent of Navarre to autonomous status, that adapted their traditional laws to the new situation in which Spain is divided in autonomous communities. Would subsequently regulate the symbols of the community (laws Navarre symbols of 1986 and 2003).

In 1985, Domingo Aznar Magaña performed a design adaptation of the coat of arms, for use in formal events, ornamentals and the flag of Navarre. That same year, the Government of Navarre (before Diputación Foral of Navarre) approved a simplified design for its corporate image.

Kingdom of Spain
(1910–1930)

Second Republic
(1931–1937)

Francoist
(1937–1981)

In the modern era, Navarre has had three different official designs before moving to the current design.
The arms were changed with every change of regime.

== See also ==
- Flag of Navarre
