= Goiri =

Goiri is a Spanish surname. Notable people with the surname include:

- Adalberto Goiri (born 1987), Paraguayan footballer
- Enrique Goiri (1877–1925), Spanish footballer
- Juan José Mieza Goiri (1915–1999), Spanish footballer
- Luis Arana Goiri (1862–1951), Basque nationalist politician
- Sabino de Arana y Goiri (1865–1903), Spanish writer and the founder of the Basque Nationalist Party (PNV).
- José Luis Etxebarria Goiri (1925–2015), dancer and dance group director

== See also ==
- Asier Goiria (born 1980), Spanish former professional footballer
- Luc Goiris (born 1968), Belgian former rower
- María Goyri (1873–1954), Spanish Hispanist, literary critic, researcher, educator, and advocate for women's rights.
