= Eusko Abendaren Ereserkia =

Regional anthem of the Basque Country, Spain

English: Anthem of the Basque Race
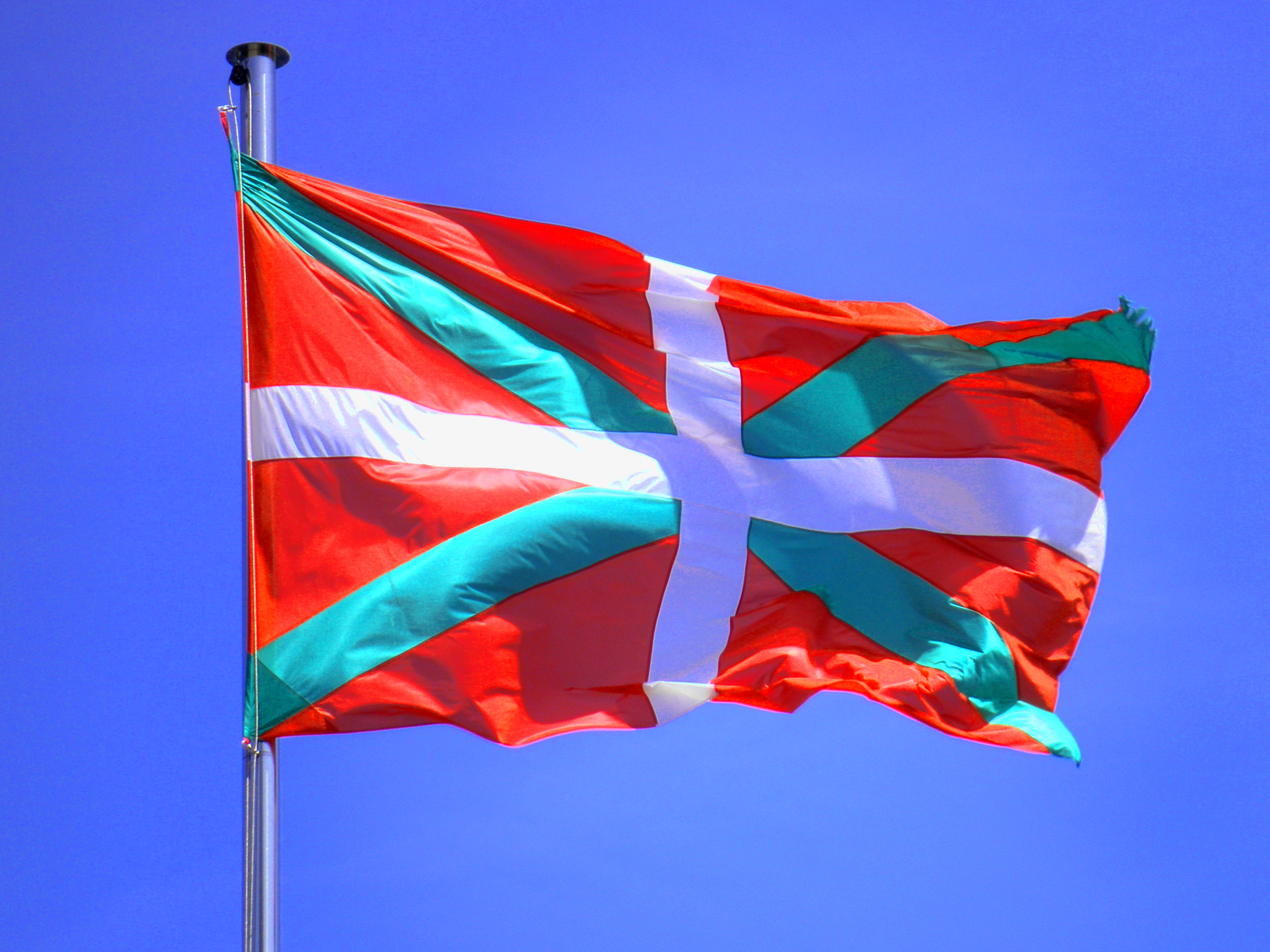
- Flag of the Basque Country
- Regional anthem of the Basque Country, Spain
- Lyrics: Sabino Arana
- Music: arranged by Tomás Aragüés
- Adopted: 1930s

Audio sample
- Official orchestral and male vocal rendition in A-flat major: file; help

Instrumental recording of the anthem

"Eusko Abendaren Ereserkia" (Note: Alternatively written "Euzko Abendaren Ereserkija".) ("Anthem of the Basque Race"), also known as "Euskadiko Ereserkia" ("Anthem of the Basque Country"), is the official anthem of the Basque Country in northern Spain. The lyrics were written by Basque nationalist writer Sabino Arana, and its melody is based on an old Basque tune. The anthem was originally used for the Basque Nationalist Party (BNP/PNV), and it was adopted by the first Basque Government in the 1930s. Its re-proclamation by the Basque Parliament on 14 April 1983 was opposed by several parties that deemed it still to be bound to the PNV rather than to the rest of the Basques.

Like the national anthem of Spain, "Marcha Real", the lyrics are not officially sung. The law makes official the music with no lyrics, since opposition parties felt Arana's text was too religious and linked to the BNP.

== Unofficial lyrics ==
Proposed Basque lyrics

Gora ta Gora Euskadi
aintza ta aintza
bere goiko Jaun Onari.

Areitz bat Bizkaian da
Zar, sendo, zindo
bera ta bere lagia lakua

Areitz gainean dogu
gurutza deuna
beti geure goi buru

Abestu gora Euskadi
aintza ta aintza
bere goiko Jaun Onari

IPA transcription (Note: See Help:IPA/Basque and Basque phonology.)

[go.ɾa ta go.ɾa eu̯s̺.ka.ði]
[ai̯n.t͡s̻a ta‿ai̯n.t͡s̻a]
[be.ɾe goi̯.ko jau̯n o.na.ɾi]

[a.ɾei̯t͡s̻ bat bis̻.kai̯.an da]
[s̻aɾ s̺en.do s̻in.do]
[be.ɾa ta be.ɾe la.gi.a la.ku.a]

[a.ɾei̯t͡s̻ ga.ɲe.an do.ɣu]
[gu.ɾu.t͡s̻a deu̯.na]
[be.ti geu̯.ɾe goi̯ bu.ɾu]

[a.βes̺.tu go.ɾa eu̯s̺.ka.ði]
[ai̯n.t͡s̻a ta‿ai̯n.t͡s̻a]
[be.ɾe goi̯.ko jau̯n o.na.ɾi]

Spanish translated version

Arriba y arriba Euskadi
gloria y gloria
a nuestro Buen Señor.

Hay un roble en Vizcaya,
Viejo, fuerte y sano,
Como el mismo y su ley.

Sobre el roble tenemos,
la sagrada cruz,
en lo más alto siempre

Cantemos arriba Euskadi
Gloria y Gloria
A nuestro Buen Señor.

Unofficial English version

O Basque country, above thou goest,
Full of glory thou art.
With thee, with our Lord honour'd.

An oak tree in Biscay resteth,
Firm and fresh it standeth,
Just like thy law it echoeth.

We find on the tree
Thy cross holy
Which always above us sitteth.

Sing, o Basque country,
Thou art full of glory.
With thee, with our Lord Honour'd.

== See also ==
- Anthems of the autonomous communities of Spain
