= Coat of arms of the Basque Country (autonomous community) =

- Armiger: Basque Country
- Adopted: 1936
- Shield: Quarterly: Álava, Biscay, Gipuzkoa, and Gules
- Supporters: A wreath of oak leaves Vert

The current Basque coat of arms (Euskal autonomi erkidegoaren armarria) is the official coat of arms of the Basque Country, an autonomous community of Spain. It consists of a party per cross representing the three historical territories of Álava, Gipuzkoa and Biscay, as well as a fourth, void quarter. The arms are ringed by a regal wreath of oak leaves, symbolic of the Gernikako Arbola. The fourth quarter constituted since the late 19th century the linked chains of Navarre; however, following a legal suit by the Navarre Government claiming that the usage of the arms of a region on the flag of another was illegal, the Constitutional Court of Spain ordered the removal of the chains of Navarre in a judgement of 1986.

== Origin ==
The Laurak Bat coat of arms used by the Basque Government until 1985

After the end of home rule in 1839-1841, the Basque governments started a mutual approach out of common concerns in face of their exposure to Spanish centralism. The movement intensified after 1866, and a motto was coined, the "Laurac bat", 'the four make one', echoing the "Irurac bat" of the Royal Basque Company, which in turn crystallized in a coat of arms including the four historic Basque districts in Spain (called variously the Sister Provinces, the Chartered Territories, the Basque Country, the Basque-Navarrese Country, etc.), to represent their common bonds, as claimed during that period by the chartered provincial governments, or the 1931 draft Statute of the Basque Country.

In 1936, the Provisional Government of Euzkadi, presided over by the first president, José Antonio Aguirre, adopted the shield with the arms of the three provinces of Álava, Gipuzkoa, Biscay comprised in the 1936 Statute (the Basque Provinces, as established in the 1833 administrative design), and Navarre. The president of the government affirmed in the preamble to the Decree of 19 October 1936, and thereby approved, the emblem and flag that was to be used by the Basque Country. Thus the shield of the Government of Euzkadi contained the arms of Álava, Gipuzkoa, Biscay and Navarre in a single blazon of four quarters surrounded by a crown of oak leaves. The Provisional Government of Euzkadi stated that "the flag must be that which gathers Basque unity and which the use, ever more frequent in the Basque lands, has sanctioned as such symbol of their unity."

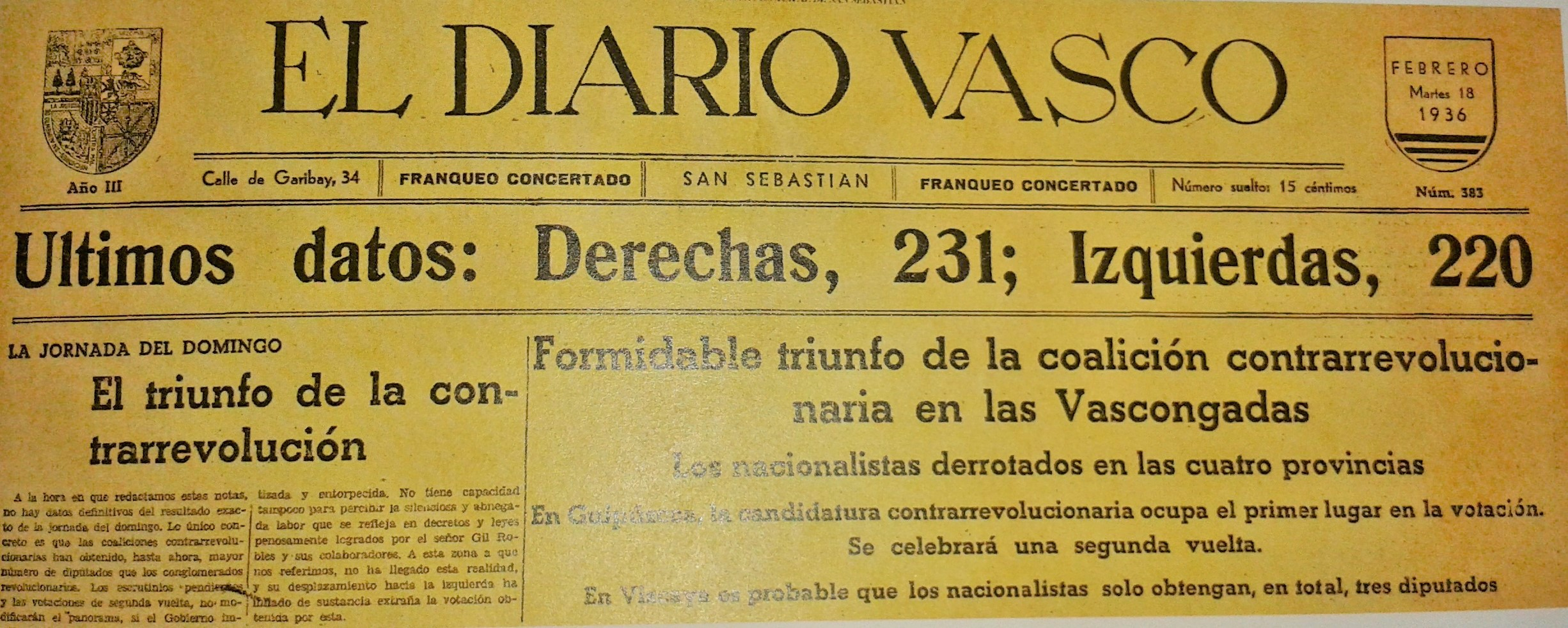
On this first page of El Diario Vasco (18 February 1936), the Laurac Bat has the coat of arms of Spain in the centre.

As an official shield, like the 1936 Basque Autonomous Community, disappeared after the pro-Franco victory in the Spanish Civil War, but the coat of arms continued in unofficial use, it was even used in its flag by the rightist pro-rebel newspaper from Donostia El Diario Vasco during wartime (data for 2 May 1937). On 2 November 1978, the Consejo General del País Vasco (General Council of the Basque Country), restored the republican shield, albeit modified as follows:

1. The Álava quarter lost the motto "En aumento de la justicia contra malhechores" and both the designs of the castle and of the arm with sword were changed. The castle is now on top of a grey rock and the arm and sword are light blue in colour.
2. In the Biscay quarter, the wolves of the arms of the house of Haro were suppressed in 1986 and the field changed from gules to argent, the bordure from argent to gold, the crosses from sinople to gules, and the terrace, or ground, from sinople to maroon.
3. In the Gipuzkoa quarter, the field changed from argent to gold, and the ground (the "terrace") was removed, leaving only the trees and the waves.
4. The fourth quarter once contained the linked chains of Navarre; however, following a legal suit by the Navarre government claiming that the usage of the arms of a region on the flag of another was illegal, the Constitutional Court of Spain forced the Basque government to remove the chains of Navarre, leaving the red background.

In 1991 the Basque Government standardised the colours used in the shield.

Basque nationalists, but not only, have used an unofficially recognised Basque coat of arms, the Zazpiak Bat. It has been argued that it differs from the original one by being divided into six squares and by including the coat of arms of the Basque regions in France. The motto "Zazpiak bat" was coined by Antoine-Thomson d'Abbadie in the late 19th century.

== The quarters ==
The arms of Álava are symbolic of the province's independence, with the dexter arm ready to fight its enemies.

The Gernikako Arbola is depicted in the arms of Biscay as a testament to its importance.

In the arms of Guipuzcoa, the champagne symbolises the Bay of Biscay and the trees the tripartite division of the province.

The fourth quarter of the Basque coat of arms once showed the linked chains of Navarre.

Now it is fully gules (red).

== See also ==
- Ikurriña
- Quartering (heraldry)
- Zazpiak Bat
