= Arrano beltza =

Basque and Navarrese symbol

Flag with the arrano beltza on a yellow background, one of its most popular representations

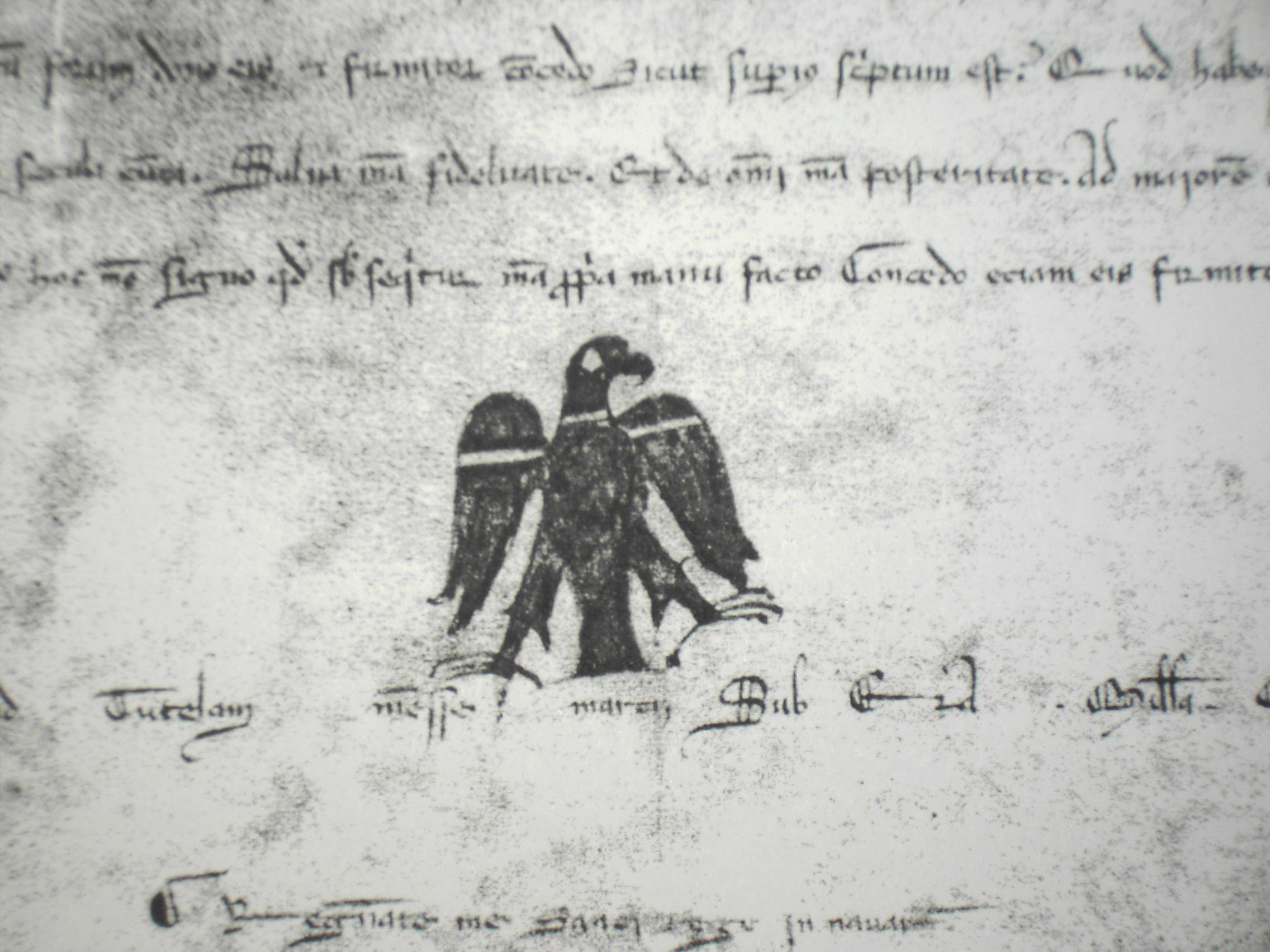
Seal of King Sancho VII of Navarre

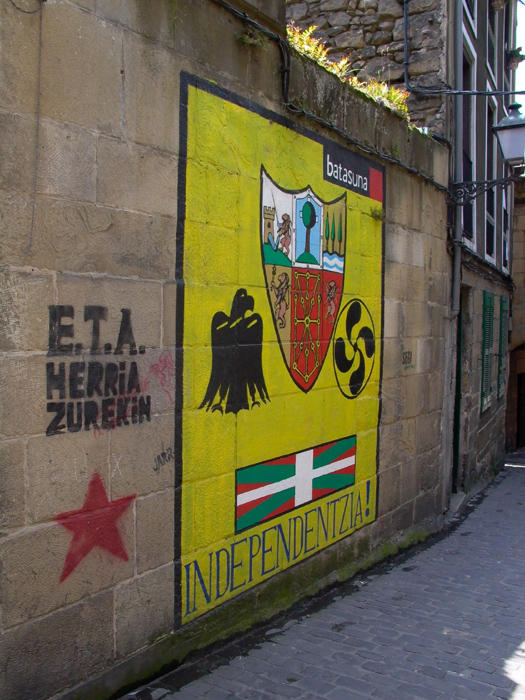
Batasuna mural painting in Gipuzkoa (2003), featuring the arrano beltza along with lauburu, ikurriña, and a version of Zazpiak Bat

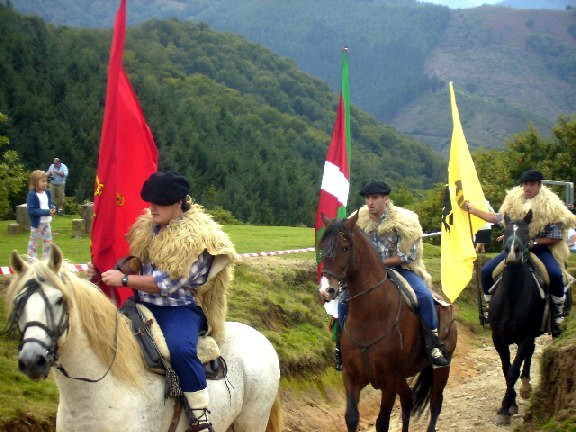
Three riders with the flags of Navarre, ikurriña and arrano beltza in an homage to ETA members

The arrano beltza (Basque, 'black eagle'; it is also the Basque name of the golden eagle, Aquila chrysaetos) is an ancient Basque and Navarre symbol depicting a black heraldic eagle upon a yellow background. Today, it is mostly used by Basque nationalists as a symbol of sovereignty and independence.

== History ==
The black eagle was originally the seal of King Sancho VII of Navarre but was later attributed to Sancho III of Navarre who, when incorporating Aragon and Castile, had under his crown all the territories of Basque culture and language, including those traditionally Castilian, since his kingdom reached from Galicia to Ribagorça. From a Basque nationalist interpretation, the rule of Sancho III constitutes a historical precedent for the aspirations of the unification of the Basque-speaking territories under one independent State. From a Spanish perspective, it is one of the first attempts at forming a unified Spain.

Note that the flag is a modern interpretation of the seal. There are no known flags prior to the 18th century when José Francisco de Isla describes a crimson flag with the chains and crown of the modern coat-of-arms.

== Usage ==
This symbol is used mostly by the so-called Ezker Abertzalea (Basque leftists). However, it is occasionally used by Spanish nationalists.

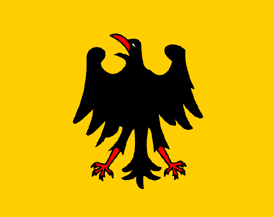
The arrano beltza bears some resemblance to the flag of the Holy Roman Emperor.

Some Spanish nationalist organisations of neo-fascist character (specifically the AUN), have on a few occasions used the arrano beltza as well, presenting it as a symbol of Spanish unity. For this idea, they allege that Sancho III ruled most of Christian Spain, from León to Barcelona, and that he was cited as Rex Hispanorum Regum, that is, "King of the Kings of the Hispanians".

== Songs ==
Arrano beltza is also a song by Basque songwriter Mikel Laboa (later covered by rock band Negu Gorriak), including the verses:

Arrano beltzarekin joan ziren joan joan Jaengo Navas de Tolosara; Nafarrak eta kate kateekin itzuli etxera.	They went with the black eagle went, went to Navas de Tolosa in Jaén the Navarrese and returned with the chains, chains.

It alludes to a legend about the origin of the coat of arms and flag of Navarre.
