= Flag of the Basque Country =

Flag and symbol of Basque nationalism

Basque Country
- Ikurrina
- Use: Civil and state flag
- Proportion: 14:25
- Adopted: 19 October 1936; 18 December 1978
- Design: A red field with the white central cross that extends to the edges of the flag superimposed on the green diagonal cross that extends to the corners of the flag.
- Designed by: Luis Arana and Sabino Arana

The flag of the Basque Country (Basque: ikurrin, with the definite article, ikurrina, pronounced /ˌi'kuri'ɲa/ in Southern Basque dialects, or /ˌi'kuri'na/ in Northern dialects) is the official flag of the Basque Country Autonomous Community of Spain. This flag consists of a white cross over a green saltire on a red field.

The Ikurrina is also used informally and symbolically to represent Euskal Herria, the collective name for the seven historical territories of Basque ethnicity, language, and culture. This broader region includes not only the three provinces of the Basque Autonomous Community, but also Navarre and the three Basque provinces located in the French Basque Country.

== Terminology ==
The name is a neologism by Luis and Sabino Arana, from ikur 'mark, sign' (itself a neologism extracted from irakurri 'to read'), comparable to the Catalan Senyera and Faroese Merkið. In Basque, it has the generic meaning of 'flag', but especially that of the Basque Country, as defined by the Euskaltzaindia (Royal Academy of the Basque Language). The original Biscayne spelling of the Aranas was ikuŕiñ (the final -a is the Basque definite article, in singular). The modern standard Basque spelling is ikurrin.

== Design ==
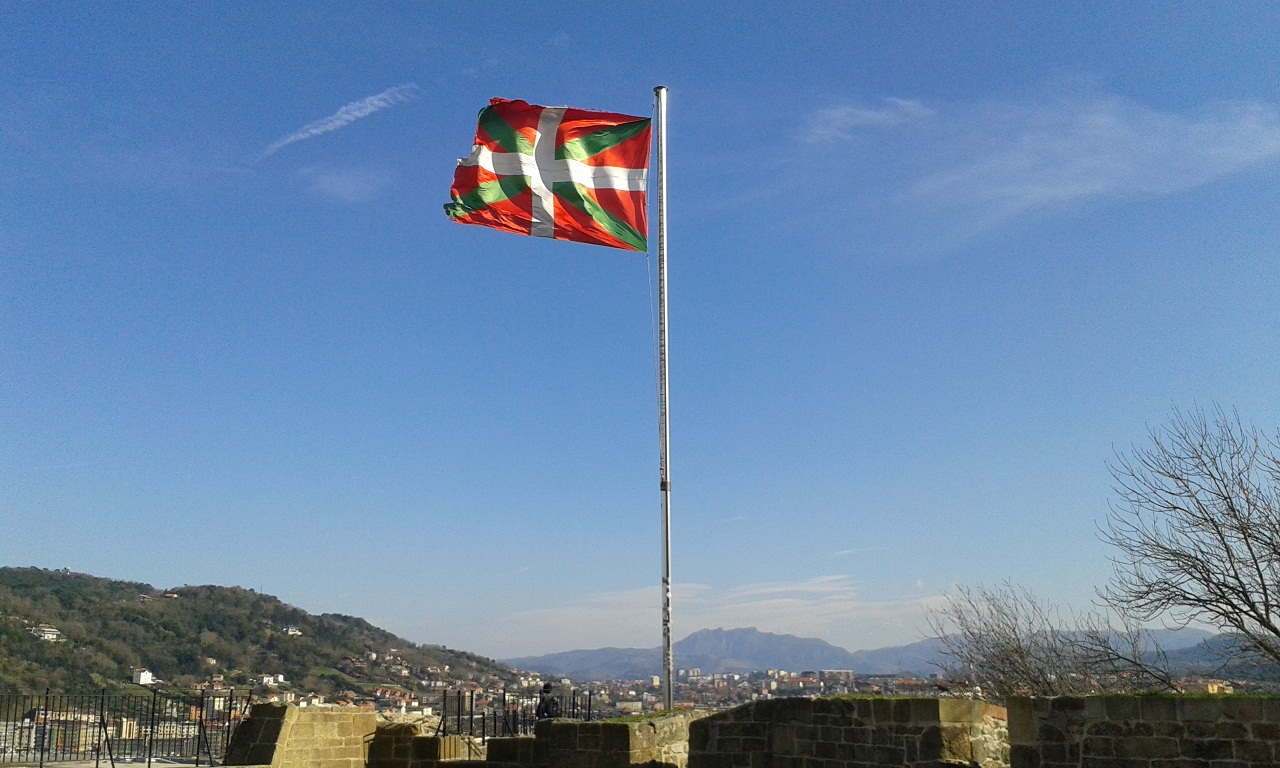
The Ikurrina at the hill Urgull in San Sebastián (Gipuzkoa)

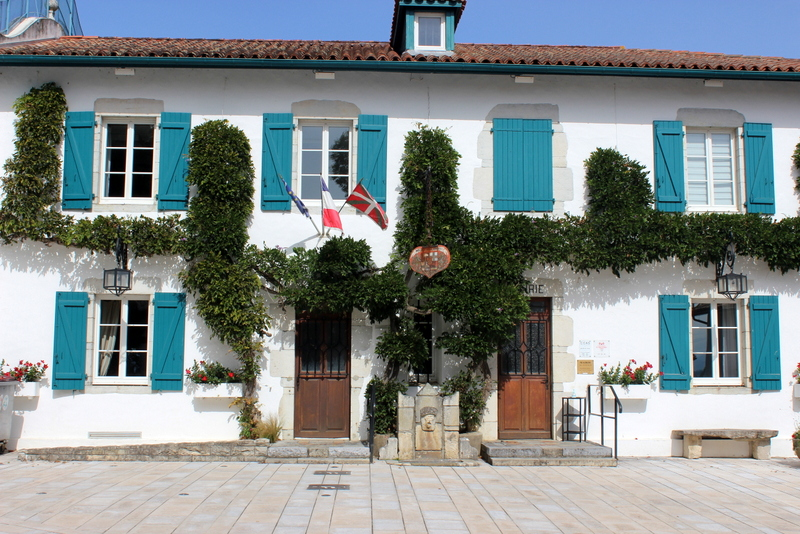
The Ikurrina at the Town Hall in Arcangues (Labourd), 2012. The Ikurrina is the unofficial symbol of the Basque Country (Euskal Herria).

Similar in pattern to the Union Jack, the flag was designed by the founders of the Basque Nationalist Party EAJ-PNV, Luis and Sabino Arana, and is commonly regarded as the national but unofficial symbol of the Basque Country (Euskal Herria). It is widely seen in the French Basque Country and forms part of the unofficial flag of Saint Pierre and Miquelon, the French overseas community in North America that was settled by French Basque and also many Spanish Basque sailors. The Ikurrina is also the flag of the Basque Nationalist Party (EAJ-PNV). A controversy exists because at first it was only the symbol of a section of the party (the section representing the province of Biscay) and many people thought that another flag must represent the entire country.

The red ground symbolizes the Biscayne people, the green saltire might represent the Oak of Guernica, a symbol of the old laws of Biscay, or Fueros; and over them, the white cross, God's symbol of Basque Catholic devotion. Thus, red, white and green have become the national Basque colors.

== History ==
The flag was designed in 1894 to represent the province of Biscay in a set of one flag for each of the seven Basque provinces and one for the whole country; however, since PNV activity was scarce outside of Biscay, only the Biscayne flag was publicly recognized. It was hoisted for the first time in the "Euzkeldun Batzokija", the club that preceded EAJ-PNV. The party adopted it in 1895 and, in 1933, proposed it as the flag of the whole Basque Country.

Since the Basque people had accepted the "ikurrina", at the suggestion of the socialist counselor Aznar, the Basque Government adopted it as the flag of the Basque Autonomous Region in 1936. This flag was used as the naval jack of the Basque Auxiliary Navy, a section of the Spanish Republican Navy operating in the Bay of Biscay during the Spanish Civil War.

In 1938, after the military defeat of the Basque Government, the regime of General Franco prohibited this flag – although it continued to be used in the Northern Basque Country. In the following decades it became a symbol of defiance – the first actions of the clandestine group ETA involved placing flags in public places.

In 1976, during a derby match between Athletic Club Bilbao and Real Sociedad, players from both teams united to sneak in and display the illegal Basque flag, Ikurrina, at Atotxa Stadium. The act was successful, as the authorities took no action, and it became a significant step towards the legalization of the flag.

The Basque flag was legalised again in 1977 during the Spanish transition to democracy. Two years later, the Basque Government adopted it as the flag of the Basque autonomous community. It is also used as an unofficial flag for some sectors of Basque society in other provinces.

== Gallery ==
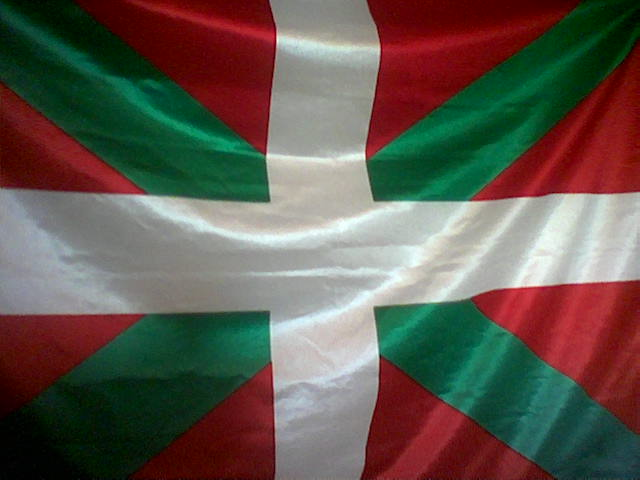
A Basque flag.

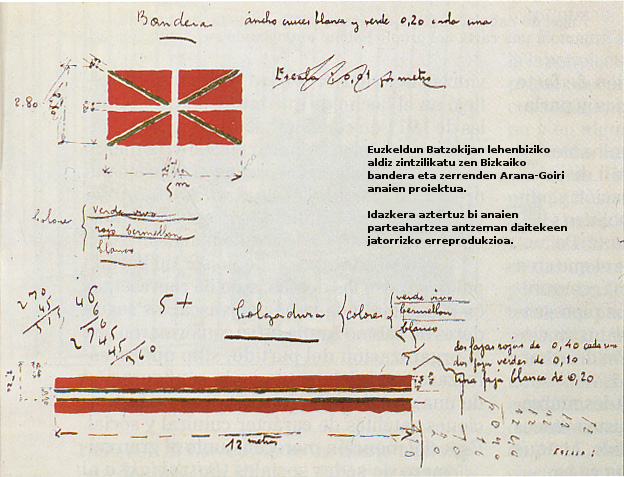
Original design of Arana-Goiri brothers of Basque Flag or Ikurrina, 1894.

Initial design of the Ikurrina.

Original proposed flag to represent the entire Basque Country.

The Basque left-wing nationalist party Herri Batasuna used a logo inspired by the Ikurrina.

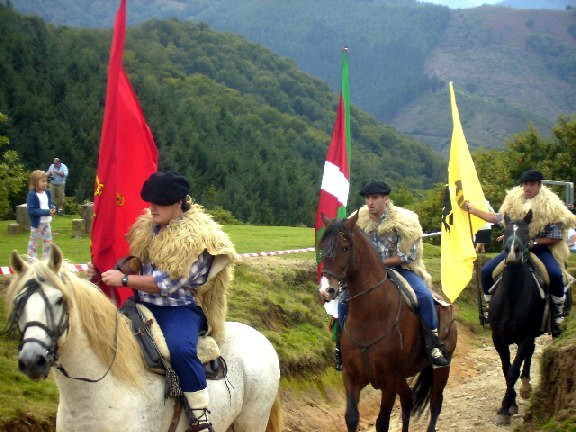
Riders with the Flag of Navarre, ikurrina and the Arrano beltza.

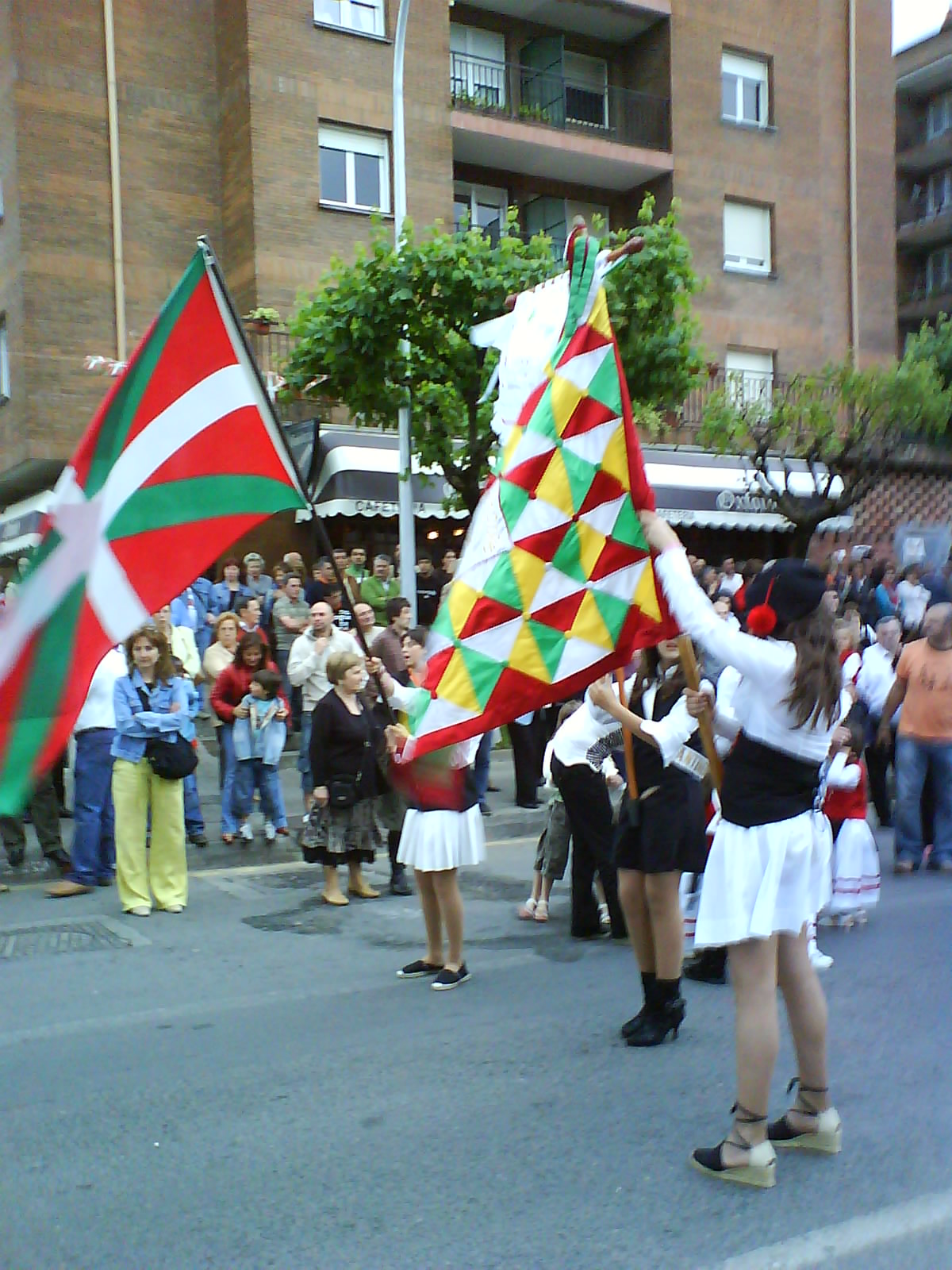
Parade in Abadiño, Biscay.

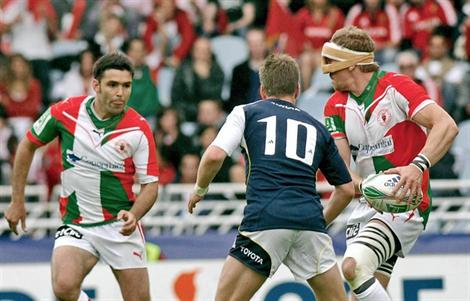
Ikurrina, Biarritz Olympique Pays Basque, 2009.

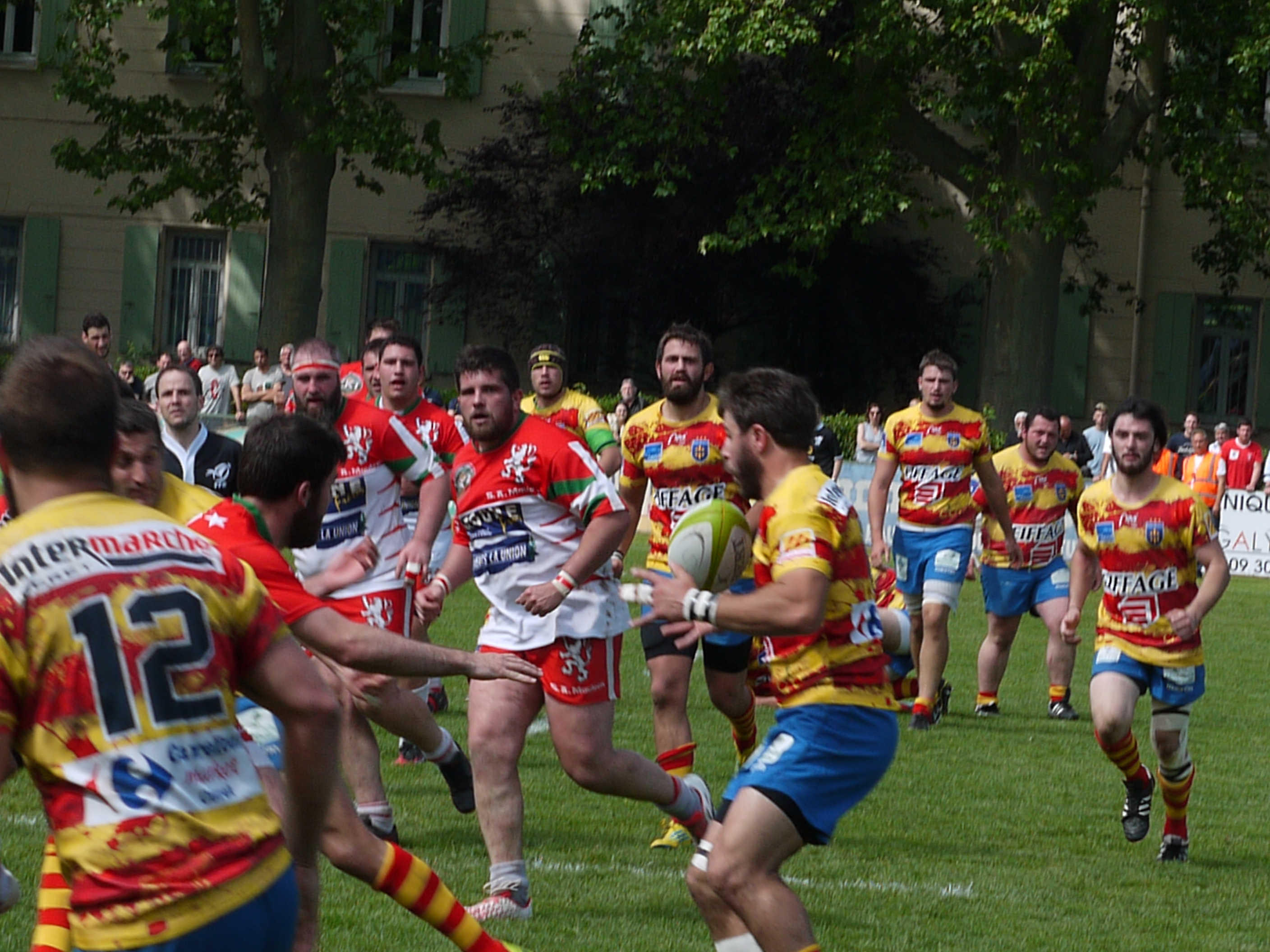
Mauleon SA rugby team.

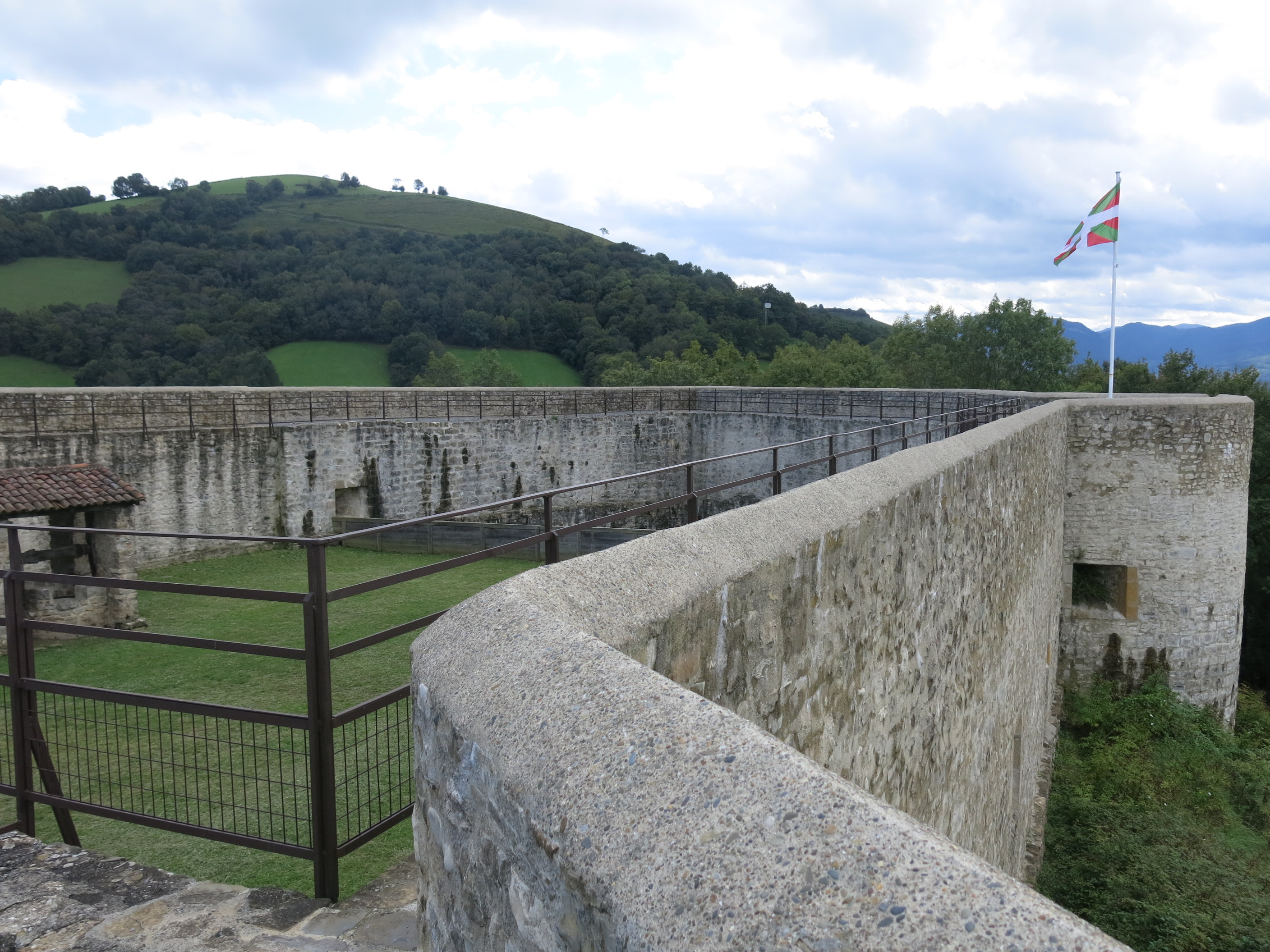
Castle of Mauléon-Licharre. 2017.

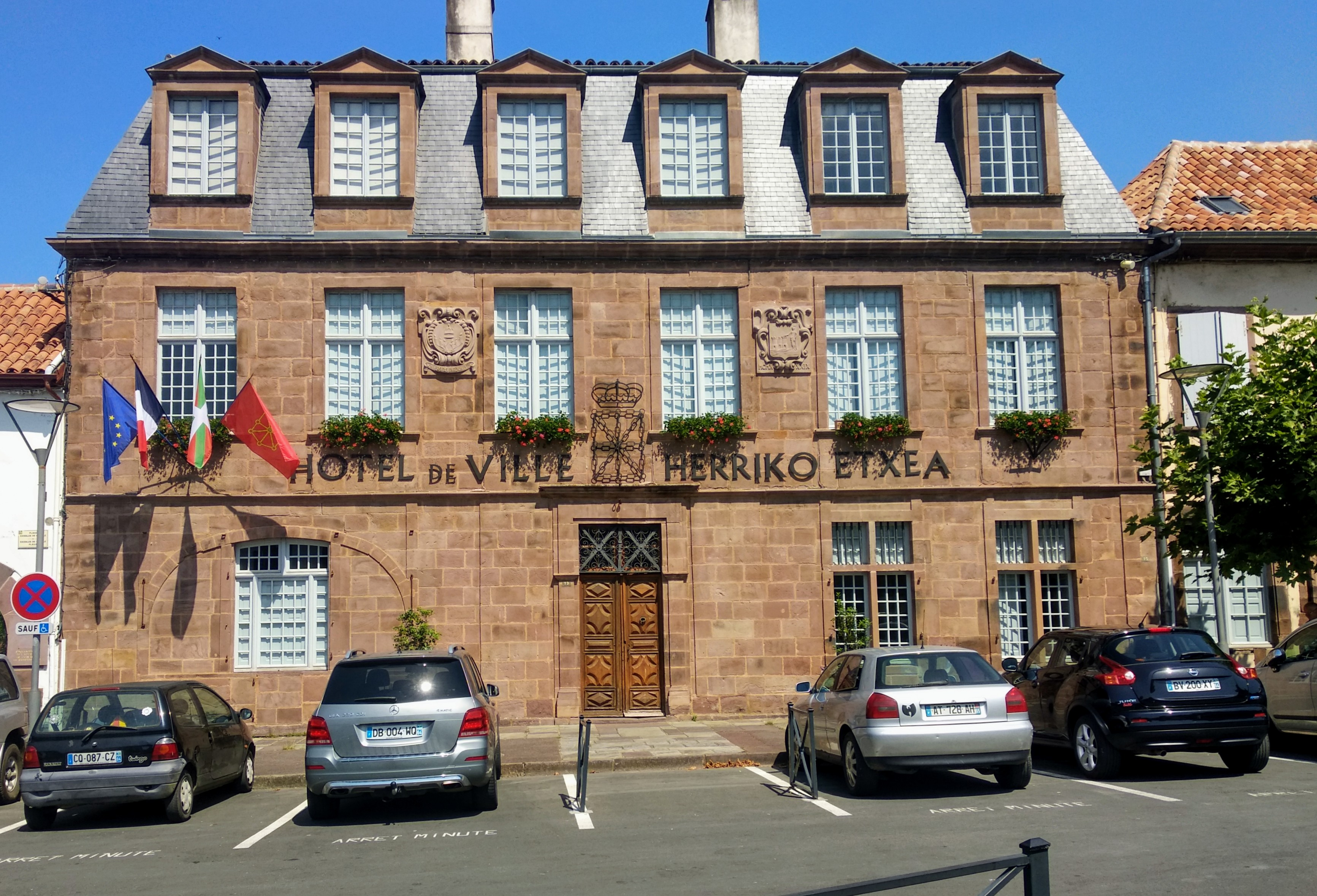
Saint-Jean-Pied-de-Port, 4 flags in the Town Hall.

== See also ==
- The arrano beltza ("black eagle") is another flag often displayed by Basque leftist nationalists besides Ikurrina.
- The flag of Navarre is also used by a sector of nationalism that considers the kingdom of Navarre as a precedent of a future Basque state.
- The unofficial flag and the coat of arms of Saint Pierre et Miquelon (French North America) recognizes its Basque heritage by including an ikurrina.
- Religion in national symbols
- Basque people
- Coat of arms of Basque Country (autonomous community)
- Zazpiak Bat
- Politics and sports
