= Flag of Navarre =

Flag of the Spanish autonomous community of Navarre

Navarre
- Proportion: 2:3
- Adopted: August 10, 1982

Banner of the Ancient Kingdom of Navarre, kept in the Palace of the Government of Navarre and used in solemn ceremonies

The flag of Navarre, the flag of the autonomous community of Navarre, was designed in 1910 by Arturo Campión, Julio Altadill, and Hermilio de Oloriz. In 1910, the design was approved by the Provincial Council of Navarre and it was sanctioned by the Organic Law of Reintegration and Improvement of the Regional Government of Navarre (Ley Orgánica de Reintegración y Amejoramiento del Régimen Foral de Navarra, or LORAFNA) of August 10, 1982, which was established in Article 7.2: "The flag of Navarre is red-colored, with a shield in the center."

The shield is the coat of arms of Navarre, which consists of golden chains arranged against a red background, with an emerald in the center of the pattern linked to the eight chains, with a Royal Crown, a symbol of the ancient Kingdom of Navarre, added on top of the shield.

The flag of Navarre began to be used as a symbol for the region from 1910 onwards. The color red was chosen for the flag because this was the color of the field of the coat of arms.

Previously, there had been no flag for Navarre per se, but just a royal standard for its monarchs. This was a personal symbol of the king that he included with his coat of arms. The first record of a red background for a flag dates from the 14th century, when the soldiers of King Charles II of Navarre, who intended to occupy Paris, wore distinctive berets of this color, according to Martín Larrayoz.

Subsequently, Luis Correa, chronicler of the Duke of Alba during the conquest of Navarre in 1512, mentions a standard or ensign of the same red color when he mentions "in the forward lines three hundred men-at-arms on foot with a banner colored red with certain stripes of gold on it that they all guarded and swore to never surrender."

== Official flags ==
Flag of Navarre during the Second Spanish Republic (1931–1937)

Flag of Navarre during the Franco era and the transitional period towards democracy (1937–1981)

== Historical models ==
Royal Standard of the Kings of Navarre

Royal Standard of the Kings of Navarre (modern version with chains designed in 1910).

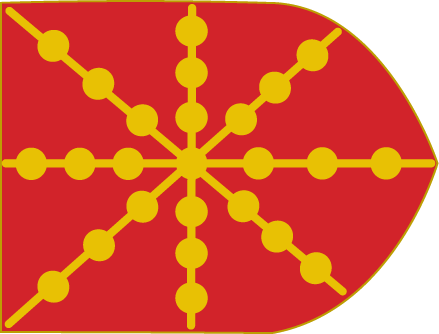
Royal Standard of the Kings of Navarre (old version)

== Variant flag ==
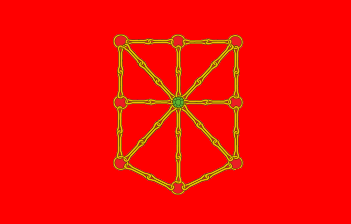
Flag of Navarre without crown or shield, used frequently by the Ezker abertzalea, among other groups.

Flag used by Navarrese independentists, sometimes adding the word INDEPENDENTZIA.

Flag of Pyrénées-Atlantiques.

Flag of Lower Navarre.

== See also ==
- Coat of arms of Navarre
