= Zazpiak Bat =

Nickname for the Basque coat of arms

Coat of arms of the Basque Country
- Armiger: Basque Country
- Shield: Quarterly: Navarre, Gipuzkoa, Biscay, Álava, Labourd, and Soule

Zazpiak Bat (IPA: [s̻as̻pi.ak bat̪]; lit. 'The seven [are] one') is a heraldic nickname for the Basque coat of arms which includes the arms of the seven Basque provinces, stressing their unity. It was designed by historian Jean de Jaurgain in 1897 for the Congrès et Fêtes de la Tradition basque celebrated at Saint-Jean-de-Luz.

== Name ==
Zazpiak Bat is a motto attributed to Basque explorer Antoine-Thomson d'Abbadie in the late nineteenth century, from the Basque words zazpiak meaning 'the seven' and bat meaning 'one', translates as "the seven [are] one" and refers to the seven Basque Country historic provinces. However, it was first cited in 1836 by a friend and collaborator of Antoine d'Abbadie's, the Souletin Agosti Xaho (Etudes grammaticales sur la langue euskarienne, dedicated to the Zazpirak Bat). The motto is based on a similar one fashioned by the Enlightenment society Real Sociedad Bascongada de Amigos del País in 1765, Irurac bat, 'the three [are] one', after the provinces currently making up the Basque Autonomous Community), while a like variant was created too in the 19th century known as Laurak bat ('the four [are] one', after the four Basque peninsular provinces), a motto quoted and celebrated by the Provincial Government of Navarre in 1866.

== History ==
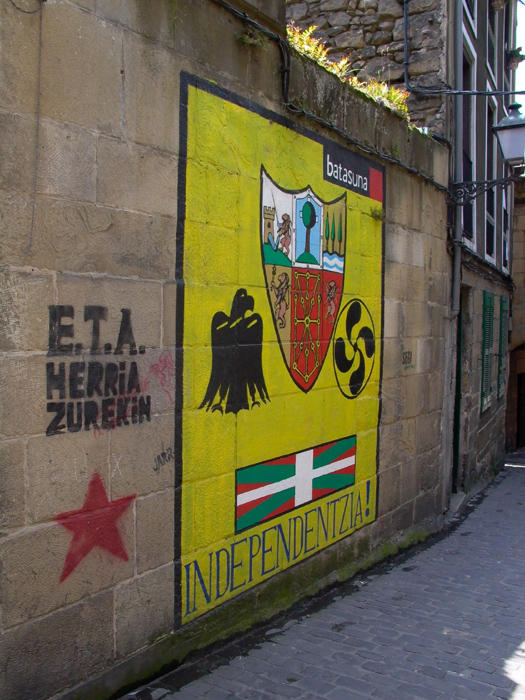
Batasuna mural painting in Gipuzkoa (2003), featuring the modern version of Zazpiak Bat along with arrano beltza, lauburu, and Ikurriña

The original Zazpiak Bat features a design of traditional arms of the Basque territories, namely Alava, Gipuzkoa, and Biscay (which form the Basque Autonomous Community) plus Nafarroa; and the three that are part of the Pyrénées Atlantiques department (Labourd, Soule and Lower Navarre). The coat of arms of the third traditional province, Lower Navarre is subsumed under the coat of arms of the Kingdom of Navarre, therefore represented by the latter. The modern design is based on the current simplified heraldry of these territories.

=== Laurak Bat ===
Laurak Bat, with the four Basque provinces of peninsular soil, was adopted as the coat of arms of the Basque autonomous community. The red background of the Navarrese insignia currently occupies the fourth quarter of the coat of arms of the Basque Country.

== General references ==
- Altzibar, Xabier (1998). "'Zazpiak Bat' gaia XIX. mendean (The 'Zazpiak Bat' topic in the 19th century)". Antoine d'Abbadie, 1897-1997 (PDF). Bilbao: Euskaltzaindia; Eusko Ikaskuntza. pp. 663–688. ISBN 8489516715.
