= Luis Arana (politician) =

Basque nationalist politician (1862–1951)

Luis Arana Goiri
- Born: 25 August 1862; Abandoko elizatea (now a part of Bilbao), Spain
- Died: 1 June 1951 (aged 88); Santurtzi, Spain
- Other name: Arana ta Goiri'taŕ Koldo
- Occupation: Politician
- Political party: Basque Nationalist Party
- Father: Santiago Arana
- Relatives: Sabino Arana (brother); Paulina Arana Goiri (sister)

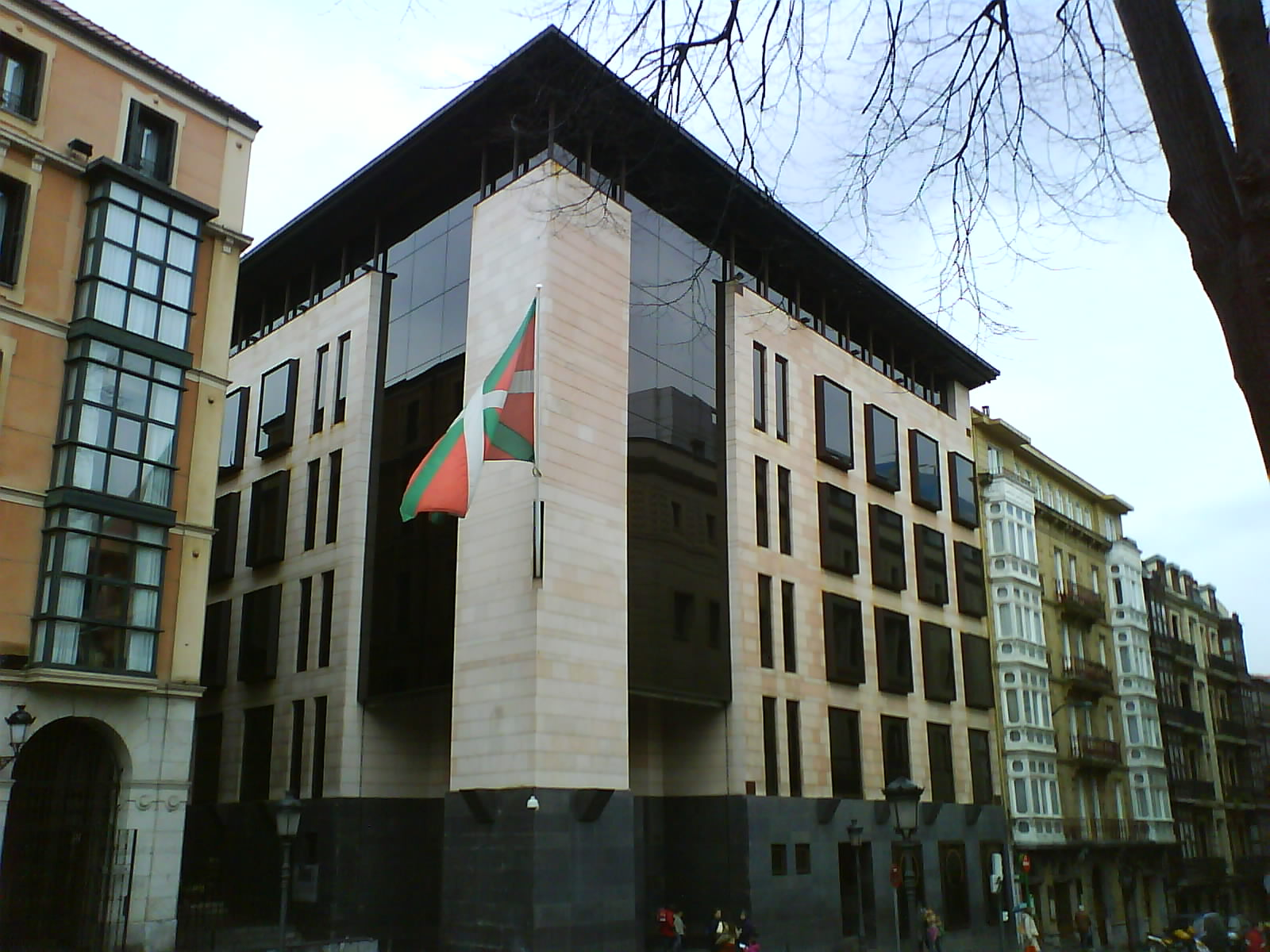
The site of the former Arana family house, Sabin-Etxea, is now the EAJ-PNV central office.

Luis Arana Goiri, self-styled as Arana ta Goiri'taŕ Koldobika (1862 in Bilbao – 1951 in Santurtzi), was a Basque nationalist politician and founder of the Basque Nationalist Party (PNV) (and creator of its flag) along with his brother Sabino Arana. He served as president of the PNV 1911?–1916, 1922–1930 (Aberri), and 1932–1933.
