= Antoine Thomson d'Abbadie =

Irish-born Basque explorer, geographer, ethnologist, linguist and astronomer

- Antoine Thomson d'Abbadie
- Born: 3 January 1810; Dublin, Ireland
- Died: 19 March 1897 (aged 87); Paris, France
- Citizenship: France
- Scientific career
- Fields: Geographer

Antoine Thomson d'Abbadie d'Arrast (3 January 1810 – 19 March 1897) was a Basque-Irish explorer, geographer, ethnologist, linguist and astronomer, renowned for his expeditions in Ethiopia (Note: Although referred to as Ethiopia here, the region that they traveled is more accurately defined as Abyssinia or in today's geography northern Ethiopia and Eritrea.) during the early 19th century. He was the elder brother of Arnaud-Michel d'Abbadie, who accompanied him on his travels.

== Biography ==
Antoine Thomson d’Abbadie was born a British subject in Dublin, Ireland. His mother, Madame Thompson, was Irish, and his father, Michel d’Abbadie, was a native of Arrast-Larrebieu of partial noble descent. He descended from an ancient lineage of lay abbots based in Arrast, a commune in the canton of Mauléon. These lay abbots were originally instituted by Charlemagne to protect the borderlands against Saracen incursions. Residing in the abbeys of the Basque region, they lived with weapons in hand, ever prepared to defend their territories. They were granted the right to collect tithes and participated in the appointment of priests, selecting candidates in collaboration with the bishop. The name "d’Abbadie" originally referred not to a surname but to their ecclesiastical function ("abbatia," "abbadia").

In 1818, the family relocated to France, where Antoine and his brother received a rigorous scientific education. (Note: The date of the move to France by the family is given as 1820 by some.) Antoine earned a bachelor's degree in Toulouse in 1827 and began studying law in Paris in 1829.

On 21 February 1859, he married Virginie Vincent de Saint-Bonnet. He later settled in Hendaye where he acquired 250ha of land to construct a castle. He also served as the mayor of Hendaye from 1871 to 1875.

D’Abbadie was made a Knight of the Legion of Honour on 27 September 1850 and later served as president of the French Academy of Sciences. Upon his death in 1897, he bequeathed the Abbadia estate and castle in Hendaye, generating an annual revenue of 40,000 francs, to the Academy of Sciences. This legacy came with the stipulation that the academy compile a catalogue of 500,000 stars within fifty years.

== Education ==
Michel d’Abbadie returned to France with his family around 1820. Settling initially in Toulouse, he personally oversaw the education of his children, who were placed under the care of a governess. “I was raised,” Antoine later recounted, “in the English tradition alongside my sisters. We spent our days and nights in a dormitory, closely monitored by a servant. In the evenings, we had little opportunity to converse with our parents, save for an occasional story from Father before being sent to play quietly in a corner of the room. We always addressed our parents formally, as ‘Sir’ or ‘Madam.’”

Antoine remained at home for three or four years, “far removed from the strict discipline of a boarding school tutor.” At the age of 13, he entered middle school, where he demonstrated enthusiasm for his studies and curiosity about the unknown in his surroundings. He once asked his governess, “What lies at the end of the road?” She replied, “A river, my friend.” “And what lies beyond the river?” he inquired. “A mountain,” came the answer. “And beyond the mountain?” the boy persisted. “I cannot say, for I have never been there,” she admitted. “Then I shall journey forth and discover it myself,” declared the child. This insatiable thirst for knowledge became a defining characteristic of Antoine d’Abbadie's life. Gifted with extraordinary linguistic abilities, he would go on to master numerous languages, including English, Italian, German, Latin, Greek, Hebrew, Arabic, Berber, and several Ethiopian languages.

In August 1827, Antoine obtained his baccalaureate and returned to Toulouse to study law. Among his closest friends at the time were Pierre Étienne Simon Duchartre, Bernard-Adolphe Granier de Cassagnac and Léonce Guilhaud de Lavergne.The young men often discussed their ambitions for the future.

From an early age, d’Abbadie harboured the passions and aspirations of an adventurer. While initially vague, his ideas gradually crystallized into a more concrete vision. “After completing college in 1829,” he later recounted, “I undertook six years of study specifically aimed at preparing myself for the exploration of Africa’s interior, which I intended to enter through Tunisia and Morocco. Reading the travels of Bruce transported my imagination to East Africa—a region marked by extensive migrations and the origins of enduring traditions, yet veiled in mystery. I became convinced that the most noble pursuit a man could dedicate himself to was the study of his fellow human beings.”

During these six formative years, d’Abbadie rigorously prepared himself for the challenges of exploration. Gifted with exceptional physical agility, even by Basque standards, he spent years honing his body and mind through physical training. He became skilled in fencing, practised gymnastics, competed in endurance races under various weather conditions, and developed into an accomplished swimmer. During a vacation in Biarritz in 1827, he impressed the local population by swimming to the Boucalot rock, located nearly 500 meters offshore.

== Science and explorations ==
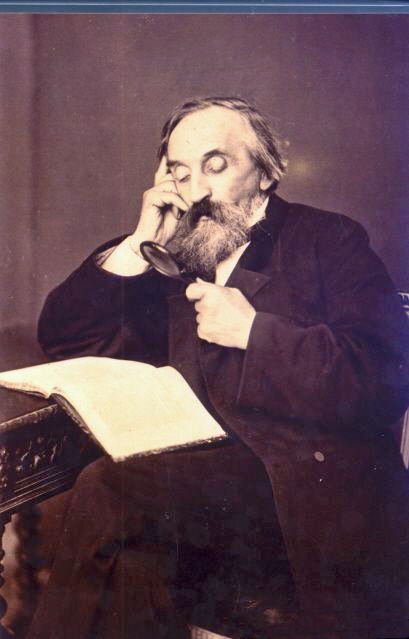
Antoine d'Abbadie

In 1835, the French Academy commissioned Antoine d’Abbadie to undertake a scientific mission to Brazil. The findings of this expedition were later published in 1873 (Note: The date of the trip to Brazil is stated as 1836 by some sources.) under the title Observations relatives à la physique du globe faites au Brésil et en Éthiopie. In November 1836, he embarked on the frigate L'Andromède, accompanied by Louis-Napoléon Bonaparte, who was then in exile following the failed Strasbourg uprising.

Having successfully completed his assignment in Brazil, Antoine hastened to Cairo in 1837 to join his younger brother, Arnaud, who awaited him there. The two young explorers, aged 26 and 21, subsequently embarked on an expedition that would keep them in Ethiopia for nearly 12 years.

In February 1838, the d’Abbadie brothers landed at Massawa. They travelled extensively throughout Ethiopia, reaching as far south as the Kingdom of Kaffa. Often journeying together but occasionally venturing separately, their explorations encompassed scientific research and political engagement. Antoine, in particular, immersed himself in local political dynamics, advocating for French interests and supporting Catholic missionary efforts.

At the beginning of the 19th century, Protestant missions began to be established in Ethiopia.

Father Sapeto, a Vincentian from the Syrian mission, joined Antoine and Arnaud d'Abbadie in Cairo in 1837. He wanted to become a missionary in Ethiopia and perhaps found a Catholic mission or die a martyr. He travelled from Massawa to Adwa with Arnaud d'Abbadie, and following Arnaud's advice, obtained permission from a religious tribunal to remain in Adwa to learn the language and customs of the country.

When Antoine d'Abbadie returned to Europe in July 1837, Father Sapeto gave him letters to Cardinal Fransoni, Prefect of the Congregation for the Evangelisation of Peoples, requesting the Vatican's help in establishing his mission. The Vincentians Justin de Jacobis and Montuoro joined Father Sapeto; the Vincentian mission was founded.

On March 9, 1845, Antoine d'Abbadie, in a letter addressed to Cardinal Fransoni, proposed the establishment of a mission to the Oromo population of the Horn of Africa. The proposal was approved by the Pope on March 1, 1846, and Guglielmo Massaia was appointed Apostolic Vicar of the Oromos.

Arnaud d’Abbadie held several distinguished roles in Ethiopia, including those of general, judge, and diplomat. He actively participated in battles and was granted the title of Ras, one of the most esteemed honours in the country. Antoine, by contrast, followed an academic path and became a dedicated scholar. Reflecting on his time in Ethiopia, he remarked, "When residing in a foreign country without any known antecedents, it is advisable to adopt a vocation in line with local customs, as failure to do so may result in being branded as a political spy, a hazardous accusation in any nation. As I was unable to engage in combat, agriculture, or merchandising, I identified as a "mamhir", or teacher and scholar, during my time in Christian Ethiopia and received an education from their public and non-compulsory schools."

During their extended stay, the two brothers fully assimilated into local customs. They exchanged their European attire for the turban and toga of the Ethiopians and traversed the region barefoot, as, at the time, only lepers and Jews wore sandals. This cultural integration earned them warm receptions wherever they travelled.

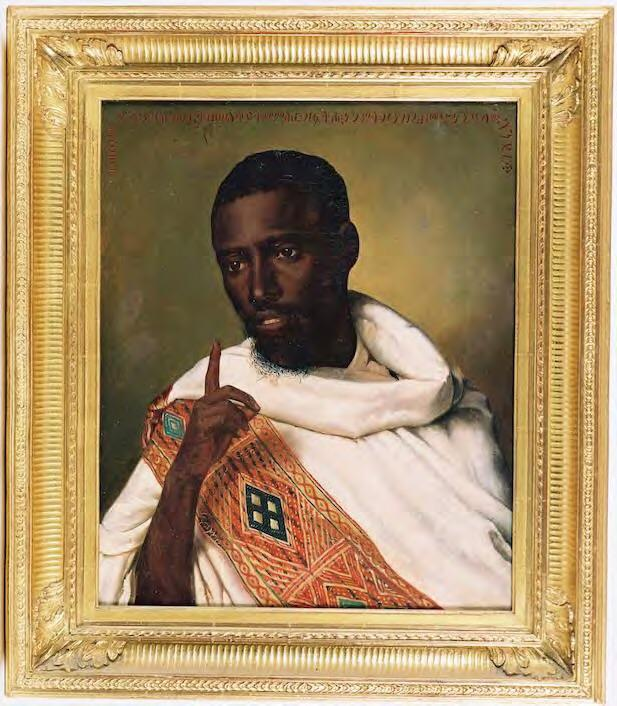
Portrait of Debtera Tewelde Medhin of Welkait

The d’Abbadie brothers undertook extensive expeditions throughout Ethiopia, documenting human and physical geography, religion, legislative texts, ethnography, philology, linguistics, numismatics, and history. During these journeys, Antoine d’Abbadie assembled about 250 ancient manuscripts and, with the assistance of the Ethiopian scholar Debtera Tewelde Medhin of Welkait, compiled the first-ever Amharic-French dictionary of approximately 15,000 words.

By late 1848, after completing their objectives, the brothers left Ethiopia. Antoine later published the scientific results of their work in Europe, notably Géodésie d’Éthiopie (Paris, 1860–1873), illustrated with ten maps, and a volume of Géographie de l’Éthiopie (1890). He also produced studies on Ethiopian geography, coins, ancient inscriptions, and magnetic observations from journeys to the Red Sea and the Levant. The general account of the brothers’ travels was published by Arnaud in 1868 as Douze ans de séjour dans la Haute-Éthiopie, later translated as Twelve Years in Upper Ethiopia.

In addition to these publications, Antoine d’Abbadie contributed to geodesy by refining measurement techniques and inventing a new theodolite for angle calculation. His work was challenged by Charles Tilstone Beke, who questioned his account of the journey to Kaffa and his claim that the Blue Nile was the main branch of the Nile. Antoine was ultimately wrong about the Nile’s main stream; however, subsequent explorers confirmed his general reliability as an observer.

== Basque and bascophile ==
Antoine d'Abbadie was deeply attached to his Basque identity and to the preservation of the Basque Language and culture. Basque through his father, he developed a particular interest in the Basque language after meeting Prince Louis Lucien Bonaparte in London. Though a resident of Lapurdi and a speaker of both the Souletin and Lapurdian dialects, he considered himself a Basque from Soule. He began his academic work on the Basque language in 1852 and remained committed to it until his death. However, as early as 1836, at the age of 26, he had already published, together with Agosti Xaho, the work Études grammaticales sur la langue basque ("Grammatical Studies on the Basque Language"), dedicated "to the Basques of the 7 provinces" — in Basque: Zazpi Uskal Herrietako Uskalduner. The popular Basque motto Zazpiak Bat is attributed to him, coined in the context of the Lore Jokoak (Basque floral games) festivals that he actively promoted.

Zazpiak Bat

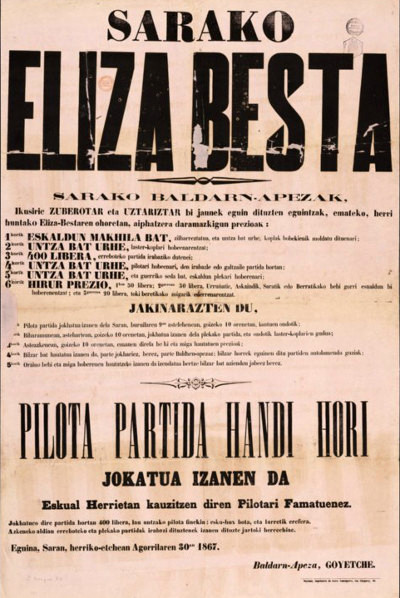
Sare (1867)

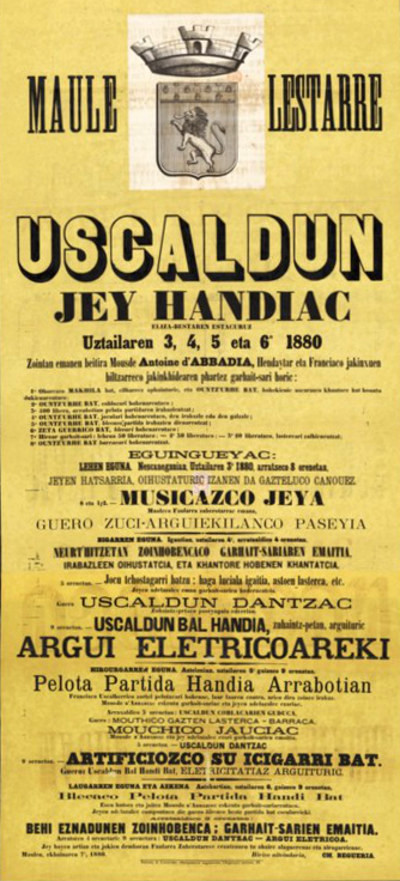
Mauléon (1880)

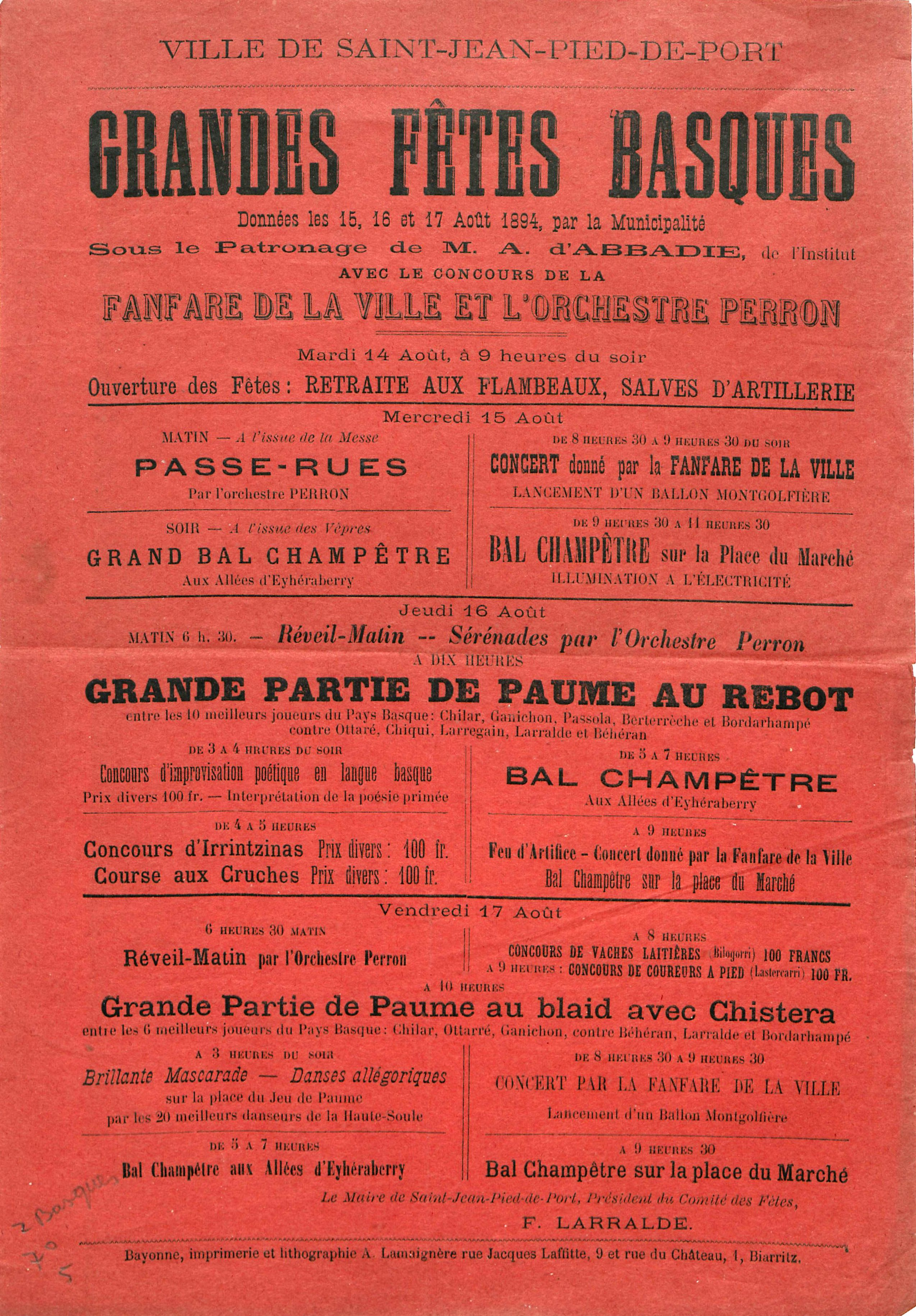
Saint-Jean-Pied-de-Port (1894)

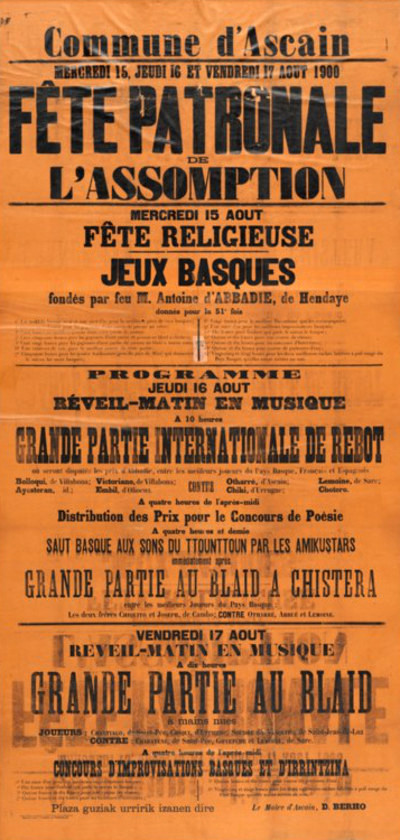
Ascain (1900)

D'Abbadie launched the fêtes euskariennes (Basque festivals) in Urrugne. These celebrations, which he supported throughout his life as their principal patron, were held across the French and Spanish Basque Country to foster a revival of the Basque language and culture. His death in 1897 did not bring an end to this tradition — the festivals continued for about thirty more years. In recognition of his efforts, he was awarded an honorary makila in 1892, along with the title Euskaldunen Aïta — "Father of the Basque People."

== Abbadia Castle ==
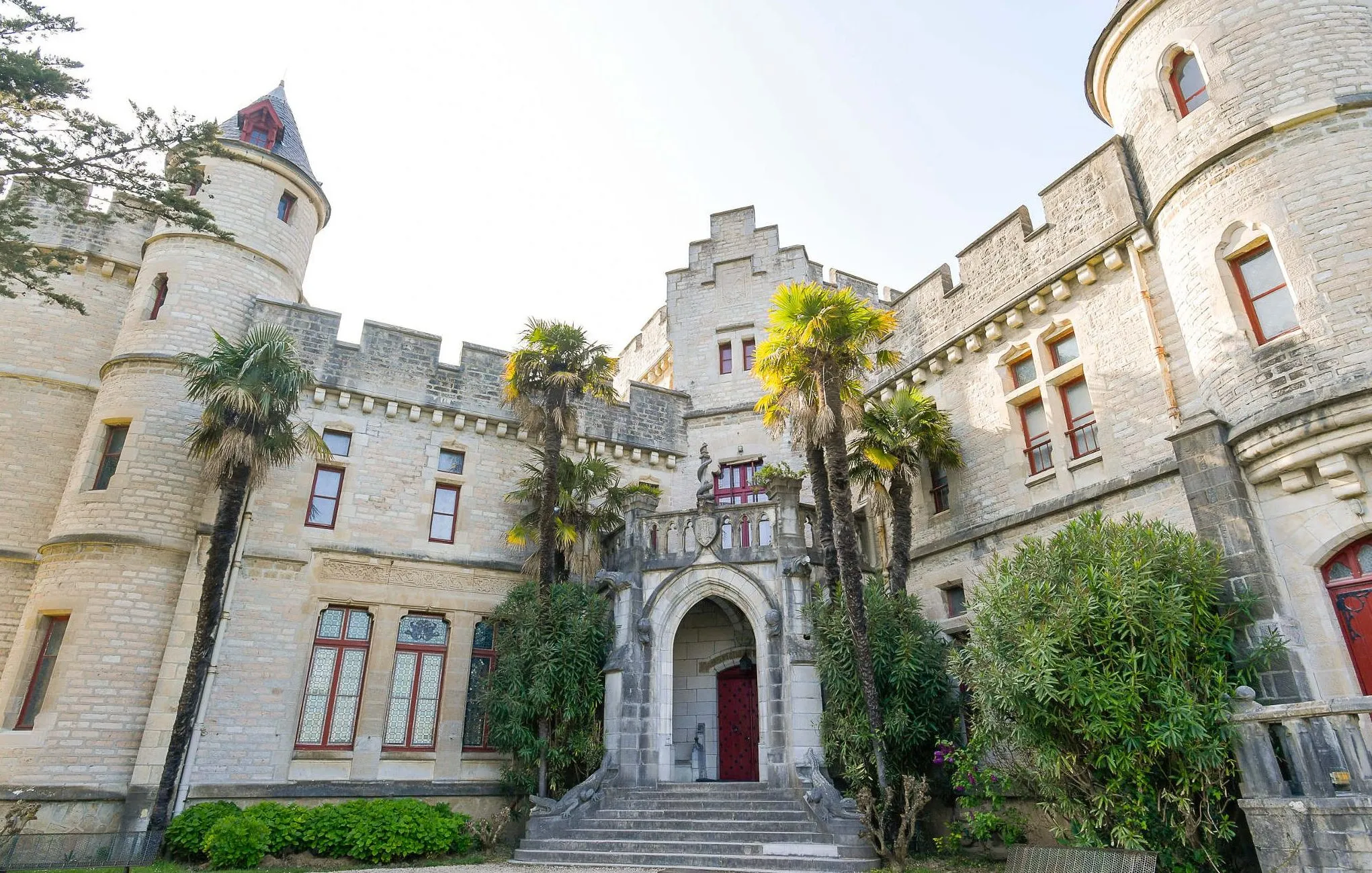
Domaine d'Abbadia in Hendaye, designed by Eugène Viollet-le-Duc

Abbadie gave his castle home the name Abbadia, which is the name still used in Basque. However, in French it is usually referred to as Chateau d'Abbadie or Domaine d'Abbadia, and locally it is not unusual for it to be called le Chateau d'Antoine d'Abbadie.

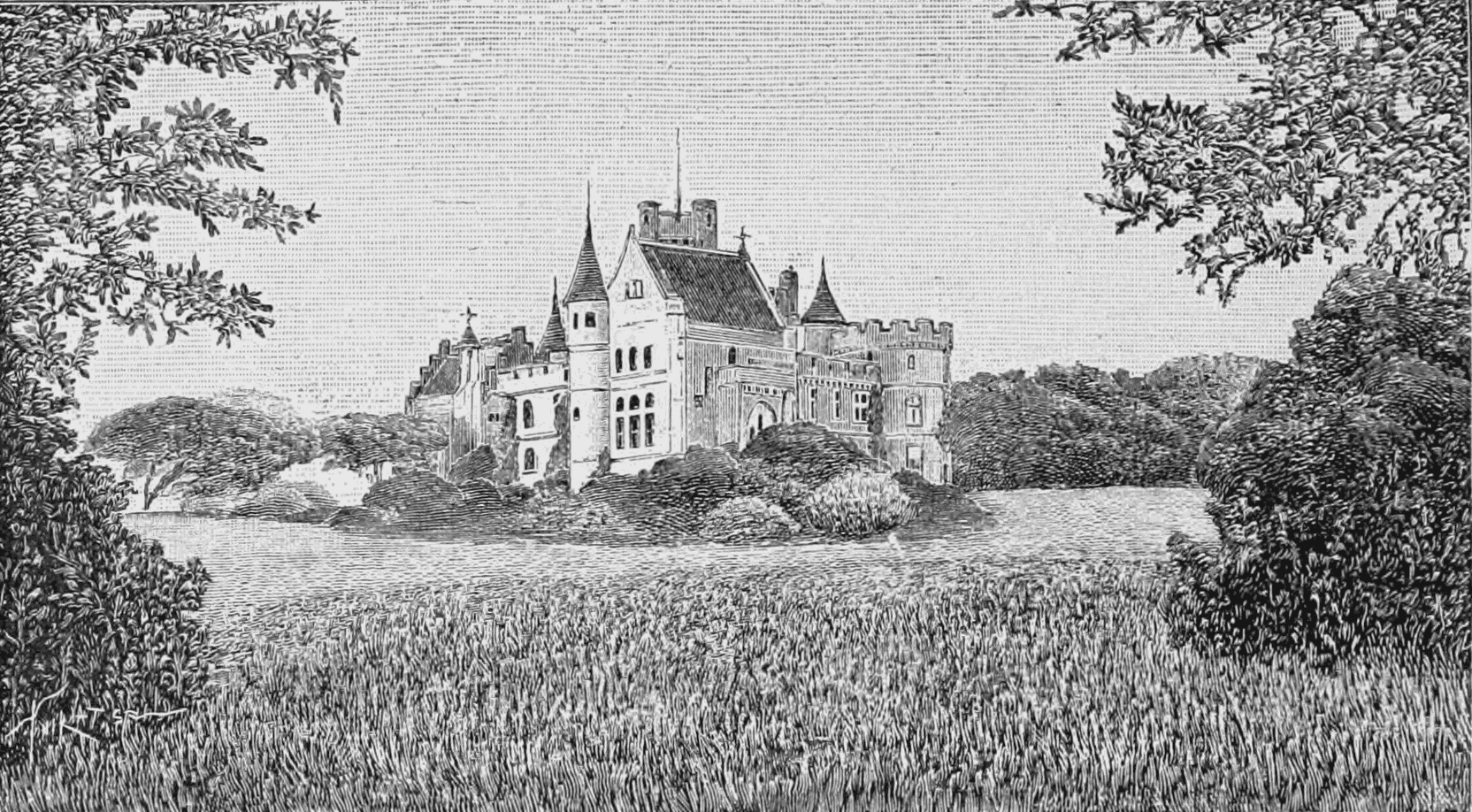
Drawing of the castle in an American magazine (Popular Science Monthly, 1898).

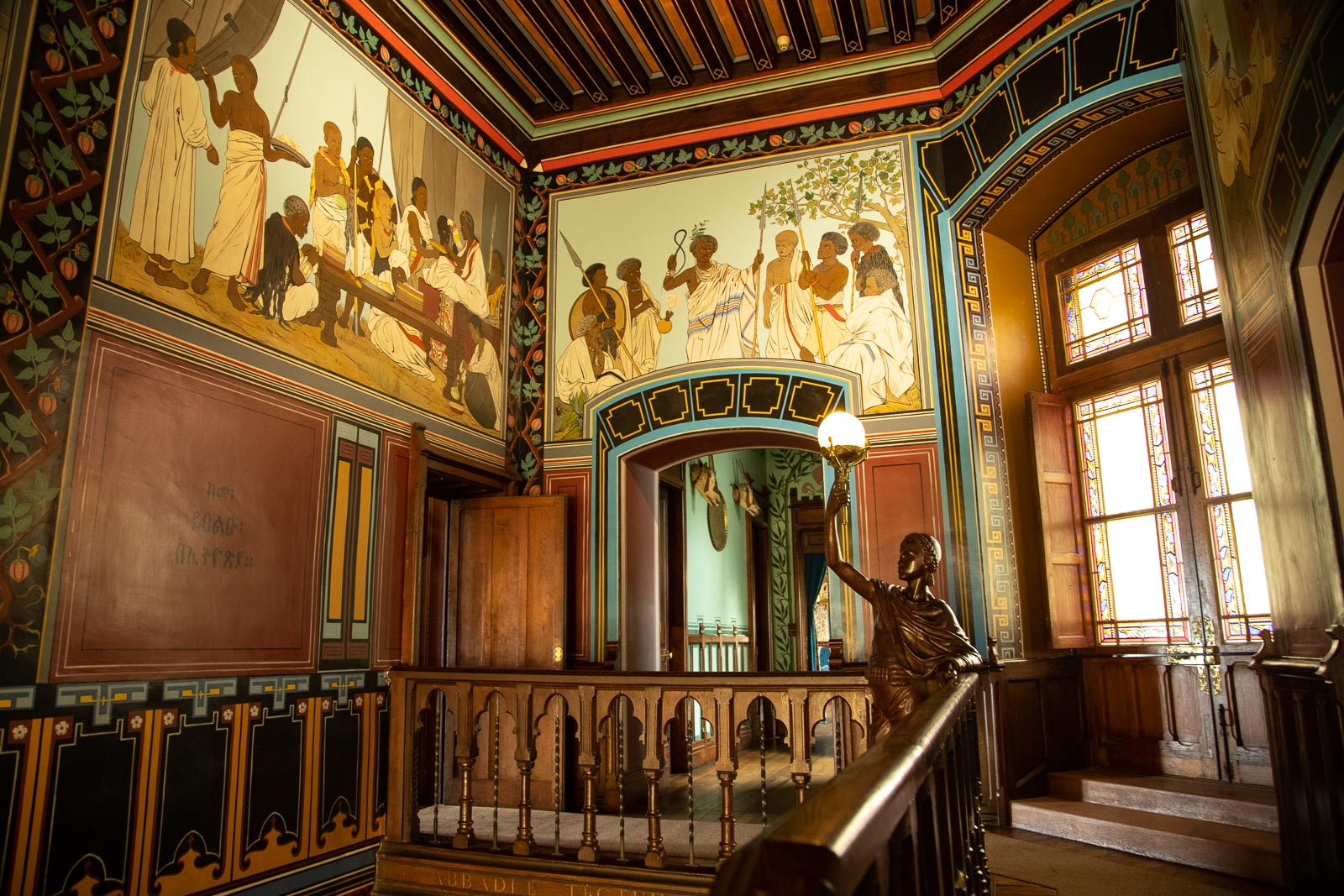
Painting of Abbadie Castle depicting Ethiopians

The château was built between 1864 and 1879 on a cliff by the Atlantic Ocean, and was designed by Eugène Viollet-le-Duc in the Neo Gothic style. It is considered one of the most important examples of French Gothic Revival Architecture. It is divided in three parts: the observatory and library, the chapel, and the living quarters. Over the front entrance door of the château is engraved "Céd míle fáilte" Irish gaelic for one hundred thousand welcomes in honour of his Irish heritage.

The château still belongs to the Academy of Science to which it was bequeathed in 1895 on condition of its producing a catalogue of half-a-million stars within fifty years' time, with the work to be carried out by members of religious orders.

The château was classified as a protected historical monument by France in 1984. Most of the château property now belongs to the Coastal Protection Agency, and is managed by the city of Hendaye.

== Publications ==
Year	Area of Study	Title	Translation	Notes
1836	Basque Language	Études grammaticales sur la langue euskarienne	Grammatical Studies of the Euskarian Language	On Gallica
1854	Basque Language	Le Dictionnaire de Chaho	Dictionary of Chaho	
1854	Basque Language	Lettres sur l'orthographe basque	Letters on the Basque Spelling	
1859	Basque Language	Travaux récents sur la langue basque	Recent Studies on the Basque language	On Gallica
1859	Ethiopia	Catalogue raisonné de manuscrits éthiopiens	Catalog of Ethiopian Manuscripts	Paris On Gallica
1859	Ethiopia, Geography of	Résumé Géodésique des positions déterminées en Éthiopie	Summarised Geodetic Positions Determined in Ethiopia	Paris On Babordnum
1860–1873	Ethiopia, Geography of	Géodésie d'Éthiopie ou triangulation d'une partie de la Haute Éthiopie	Surveying of Ethiopia and Triangulation of Parts of Upper Ethiopia	4 Vols. Paris:Gauthier-Villars On Gallica
1862–1869	Ethiopia, Geography of	Éthiopie	Ethiopia	Map in 10 sections
1864	Basque Language	Zuberoatikaco gutun bat		On Gallica
1867	Exploration	Instructions pour les voyages d'exploration	Guidelines for Exploratory Voyages	Available on Gallica
1868	Basque Language	Sur la carte de la langue basque	The Map of the Basque Language	
1868	Ethiopia, History of	L'Abyssinie et le roi Théodoros	Abyssinia and King Theodore	In English on Academia
1868	Ethiopia	Monnaie d'Éthiopie	Ethiopian Currency	
1872	Language	Notice sur les langues de Kam	Brochure of Languages Kam	On Gallica
1873	Basque, History of	Le basque et le berbère	Both Basque and the Berber	
1873	Geography	Observations relatives à la physique du globe, faites au Brésil et en Éthiopie	Observations on Earth Physics, Made in Brazil and Ethiopia	Paris:Gauthier-Villars
1880	Exploration	Préparation des voyageurs aux observations astronomiques et géodésiques	Preparation of Travellers With Astronomical Observations and Geodetic Surveys	
1880	Ethiopia	Sur les Oromo grande nation africaine désignée souvent sous le nom de "Galla"	On the Oromo: great African nation often designated under the name "Galla"	JOS volume 14 Number 1 page 122-146
1881	Science	Recherches sur la verticale	Researching the Vertical	
1881	Language	Dictionnaire de la langue Amarrinna	Dictionary of the Amharic Language	
1884	Exploration	Credo d'un vieux voyageur	The Creed of an Old Traveler	
1890	Geography	Reconnaissances magnétiques	Magnetic Reconnaissance	Paris
1890	Geography of Ethiopia	Géographie de l'Éthiopie, ce que j'ai entendu, faisant suite à ce que j'ai vu	Geography of Ethiopia, What I Heard, Which Followed What I Saw	On Internet Archive
1895	Basque Language	Lettre sur la préservation de la langue basque	Letter on Preserving the Basque Language	
1896	Abolition of slavery	Sur l'abolition de l'esclavage en Afrique	On the abolition of slavery in Africa	On Gallica
1898	Ethiopia, History of	Des conquêtes faites en Abyssinie au XVIe siècle par l'imam Muhammad Ahmad dit Grâgne; version française de la chronique arabe du Chahâb ad-Dîn Ahmad	Translation of a chronicle of Ahmad ibn Ibrahim al-Ghazi's conquests in 16th-century Ethiopia	Completed by Philipp Paulitschke and published posthumously. On Gallica

=== Awards and memberships ===
Antoine received the French Legion of Honor on 27 September 1850 with the order of chevalier or knight. He was a member of the Bureau des Longitudes, founding president of the Société de Linguistique de Paris in 1864, and president of the French Academy of Sciences in 1892. Both brothers received the grand medal of the Paris Geographical Society in 1850.
