= Sabino Arana =

Founder of Basque nationalism, writer, and political ideologue (1865–1903)

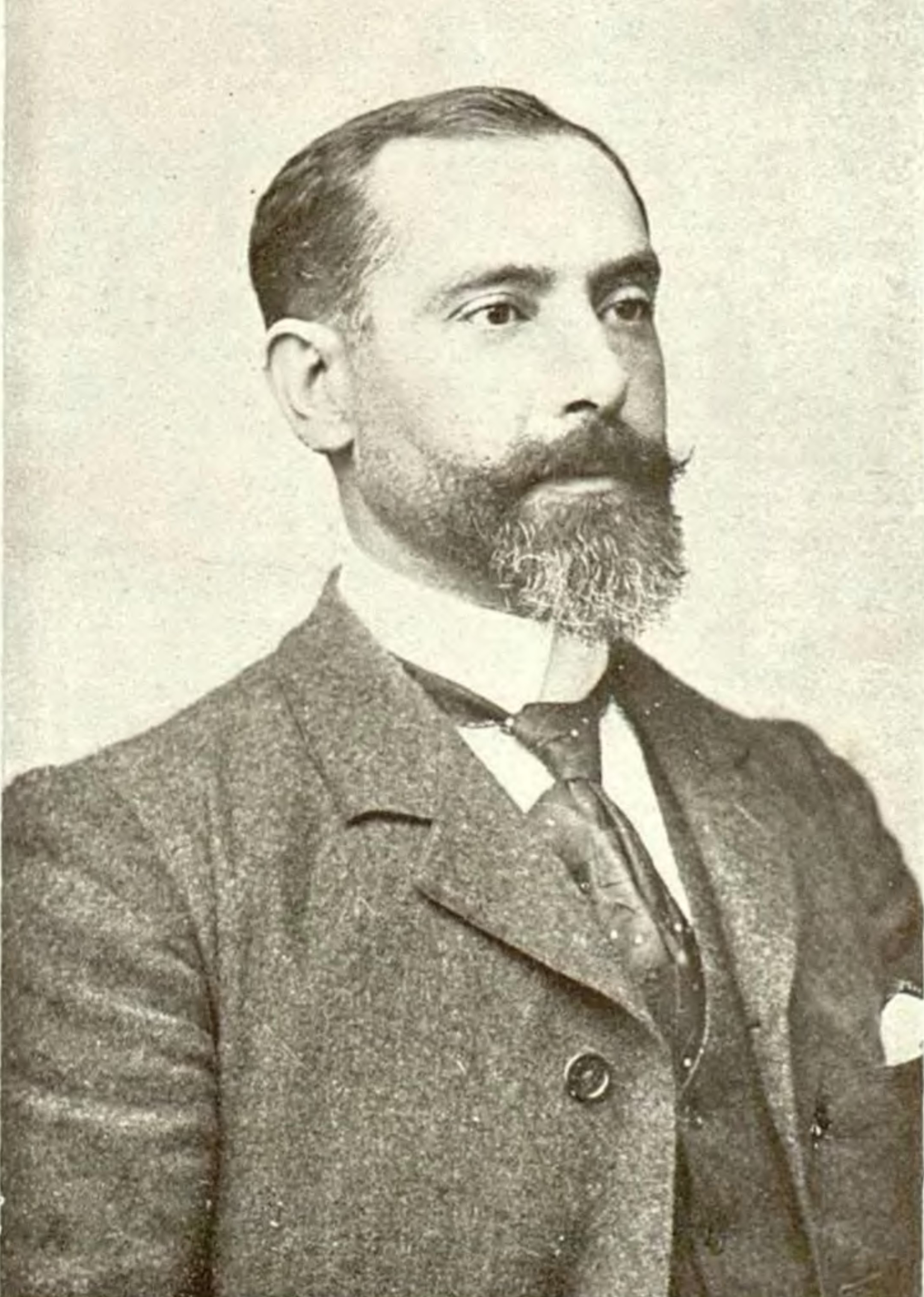
- Born: Sabino Policarpo Arana Goiri; 26 January 1865; San Vicente de Abando, Biscay, Spain
- Died: 25 November 1903 (aged 38); Pedernales, Biscay, Spain
- Citizenship: Spanish
- Occupations: Founder of Basque nationalism, political theorist, writer, linguist, and cultural revivalist
- Spouse: Nicolasa de Achica-Allende Iturri (m. 1900)
- Relatives: Luis Arana (brother)
- Writing career
- Pen name: Arana ta Goiri'taŕ Sabin
- Notable works: Bizkaitarrak, Euskalzale, Lecciones de Ortografía del euskera
- Movement: Basque nationalism

Sabino Policarpo Arana Goiri, also known by the Basque version of his name, Sabin Polikarpo Arana Goiri, or by his self-styled name Arana ta Goiri'taŕ Sabin (26 January 1865 – 25 November 1903), was a Basque writer and the founder of the Basque Nationalist Party (EAJ). Considered the father of Basque nationalism, he promoted and helped standardize the Basque language, creating a distinct Basque orthography that later served as a basis for Standard Basque, and coined many neologisms to enhance the language's prestige and resilience against Castilian and French language influences.

However, Arana's legacy is controversial due to his advocacy of sexist and racist ideas, some of which have been described as proto-fascist, drawing criticism from both supporters and critics of Basque nationalism.

Born in Abando, Biscay, Spain He died in Sukarrieta at the age of 38 after falling ill with Addison's disease during time spent in prison. He had been charged with treason for attempting to send a telegram to President Theodore Roosevelt, in which he praised the United States for helping Cuba gain independence from Spain.

== Background ==
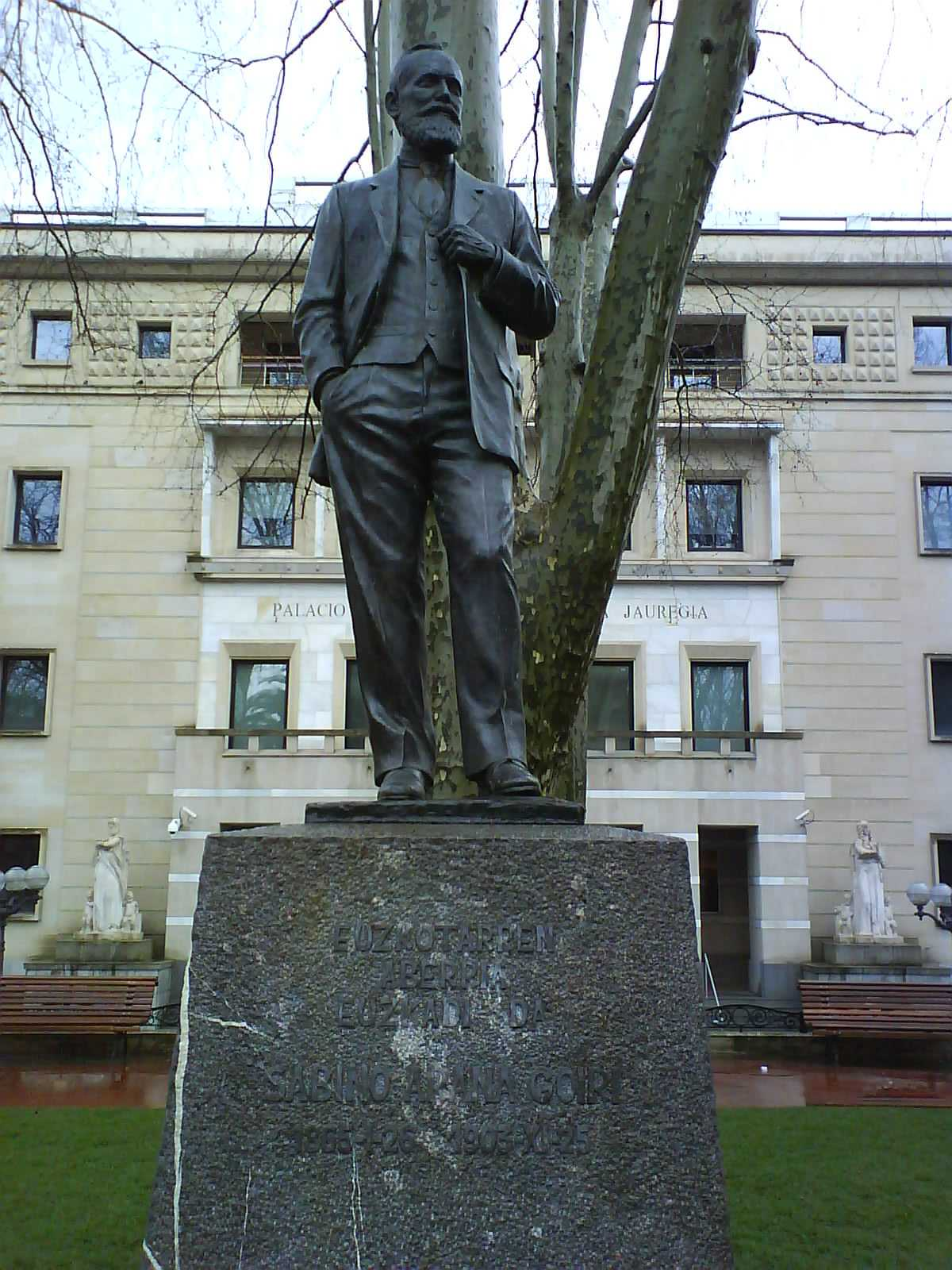
Statue in Abando, near Sabin-Etxea

One of the consequences of the First Carlist War was the substitution of the Ancien Régime Basque home rule (fueros) by a limited still relevant autonomy. A majority in Navarre and the rest of the Basque districts supported the pretender to the Spanish crown Carlos V for his support to their institutions and laws (characterized for being more liberal than elsewhere in Spain). However, they were defeated in 1839, and Navarre, Biscay, Araba and Gipuzkoa were integrated into the Spanish customs system. Basque industrialists profited from privatization of exploitations and the Spanish captive market with the iron ore and the Bessemer converter, and Biscay became "the iron California". Workers from all of Spain were attracted to the area as labourers for the burgeoning industry.

Arana was born in a jauntxo ("petty noble") family from Abando, a neighbourhood that had been recently incorporated into the city of Bilbao as the new extension for the growth of the industrial era. Abando was a Basque speaking town, but following the attitudes of the elites in the area of Bilbao during this period, Basque was not transmitted to Arana's siblings within the family. Abando and its port were at the centre of the Zamacolada uprising against attempts by the Spanish premier Manuel Godoy to recruit Basques for the Spanish army (1804), a contrafuero or breach of basic Basque legislation.

In the aftermath of the Third Carlist War (1876), Arana attended the Jesuit School of Urduña along with his brother Luis (1876–1881). Urduña became a hotspot and meeting point for the pro-fueros, primeval Basque nationalists concerned with the loss of the Basque native institutions. Arana claimed that he had a quasi-religious revelation at Easter 1882, one that he communicated to his brother Luis Arana. From then he devoted himself to the nationalist cause of Biscay, later extended to the Basque Country.

== Basque language proponent ==
The Basque ikurriña flag is a joint design of the Arana brothers.

He was an early proponent of the use of the Basque language in all areas of society to avoid its increasing marginalization in the face of Spanish language penetration, which was imposed as mandatory in schooling, administration and even cultural events such as theater.

Arana learned the language as a young man, and competed for a position as a Basque language professor at the Instituto de Bilbao, contending against Miguel de Unamuno and the winner, Resurrección María de Azkue who also became a scholar of the language. Arana attempted to establish a codified orthography and grammar for the Basque language, and proposed several neologisms to replace loanwords of Spanish and French origin (mostly Spanish).

Some of these innovations, like the characters ĺ and ŕ, were ultimately rejected in Basque language standardization efforts beginning in 1968 that led to the establishment of Standard Basque—the Euskara Batua.

== Ideology ==
His first published work was Bizkaya por su independencia ("Biscay for its independence"), where he calls for the independence of the Biscay district from Castile-Spain ("as it was before 1200"), echoing like proposals put forward by Gipuzkoa's governmental representatives to the National Convention officials Pinet and Cavaignac in Getaria during the War of the Pyrenees (1793–1795).

The document is a collection of historical events, mythical stories and sometimes inaccurate accounts of earlier battles of the ancient people of Biscay. Just as others nationalist ideologies were doing during the period, e.g. Spanish nationalism, Arana's historic accounts distorted and magnified events from Basque history.

Distancing himself from the pro-fueros advocates, Arana refused to demand a reversal of the fueros suppressed in May 1876, instead putting an emphasis on the full restoration of home rule suppressed in 1839. He considered the 1839 Spanish law 'upholding' home rule as the act putting an end to the Basque own sources of authority and 'secular Basque independence', as well as a violation of international law.

In 1894, he founded the first center for the new nationalist party (Eusko Alderdi Jeltzalea - Partido Nacionalista Vasco), the second-oldest political party in Spain, to provide a place for gathering and proselytizing. Sabino Arana, like many Europeans of his time, believed that the essence of a country was defined by its blood or ethnic composition. In Spain, the supremacy of the Spanish race and its "civilizing" pursuit over peoples held to be inferior was defended by the main political figures and parties, while a number of intellectuals Spanish and even Basque, including the Socialists, advocated for the extinction of the Basque language — ever more marginalized to family and informal environments.

He is considered by many Basques to be a gadfly that sparked the movement for the cultural revival of the Basques, and for the freedom of his people. In that respect, Arana defended the Constitutional foundations of the abolished Basque institutional and legal framework (the fueros). The EAJ-PNV, the party in power in the Basque Autonomous Community from the end of Francoism (except during 2009–2012), developed along more nuanced and pragmatic lines in respect of religion and views on race, moving away from his most controversial ideas but not from his political persona.

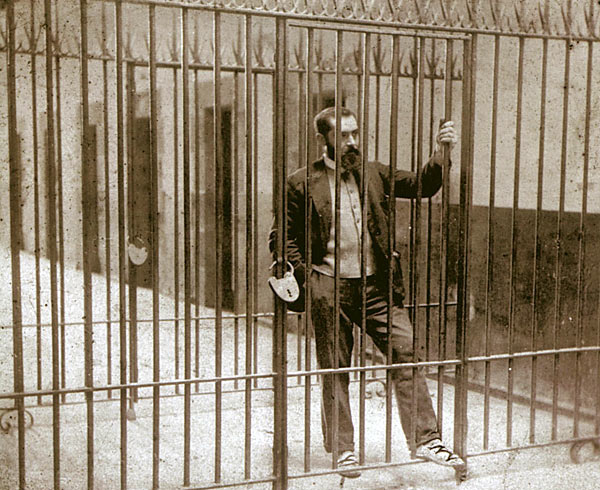
Sabino Arana imprisoned in Larrinaga for supporting Cuba's independence, pictured here in 1902

Sabino Arana created an ideology centered on the purity of the Basque race and its alleged moral supremacy over others (a derivation of the system of limpieza de sangre of Modern-Age Spain), anti-Liberal Catholic integrism, and deep opposition to the migration of Spaniards to the Basque Country. By contrast, unlike many contemporary conservative politicians in Spain, he was against slavery in Spanish colonies such as Cuba.

He was disturbed by the migration into Biscay of many workers from western and central Spain during the Industrial Revolution, into a small territory whose native political institutions had recently been suppressed (1876), believing that their influence would result in the disappearance of the 'pure' Basque race. He presented the Basque as opposed to the maketo (people from the rest of Spain):

"It is necessary to isolate ourselves from the maketos. Otherwise, in this land we walk on, it is not possible to work toward the Glory of God." Bizkaitarra, No. 19

He was a prolific writer, with over 600 journalism articles, most of them with a propaganda purpose. He liked to shock and provoke, in order to get attention from a society that he deemed unaware of its fate. There are two key aspects of Sabino Arana's political persona:

- He was not a conventional conservative; he strongly opposed slavery (legal in Spanish-held Cuba until ten years before its independence) and defended the right of South African Zulus to their land.
- He was an indefatigable worker, taking action in many areas; he learned the Basque language as an adult, undertook a number of activities to promote the Basque language and culture, created a political movement, and inventing the symbols (flag, anthem, country name) used to this day not only by Basque nationalists, but other political parties and representatives also, especially in the Basque Autonomous Community.

Another essential part of his ideology was devout Catholicism. He considered this to be an essential part of the Basque identity that contrasted with the secularism imported from other parts of Spain and abroad along with new means of production and labour, often unprecedented internal migration. However, his Basque nationalism kept him away from Carlism that was the dominant ultra-Catholic and conservative movement in the area and the ideology of his father.

Arana and his Basque nationalist movement were persecuted for their ideas against Spanish imperialism, for which he was convicted when he submitted a telegram to Theodore Roosevelt to congratulate him for his assistance in 'liberating' Cuba in 1902, and put to harsh time in prison, which ruined his health and would die soon after. Ahead of his demise, a baffling manifesto attributed to him was released by which he relinquished the core of his ideas to everyone's surprise. The nature of this document establishing the Liga de Vascos Españolistas ('League of the Spanish-minded Basques') is still subject to debate as to whether he had sincerely changed his views or whether he was instead merely trying to improve the conditions of his imprisonment. Arana's death left the question unanswered and neither his brother Luis nor the party followed through with his proposal.

== Legacy ==
Sabino Arana's ideas are considered to have spawned the Basque nationalist movement.

In 2015, a made-for-television movie called Sabin was released. In February 2017 the People's Party of the Basque Country called for a street named after Arana to be renamed because he "made possible the existence of phenomena such as the ETA terrorist group". The Eusko Alderdi Jeltzalea has kept only the more moderate part of his message. On the other hand, some Basques still revere him as the father of the Basque nationalist movement, who managed to start the turnaround of the decay of the Basque language and culture. Many Basque cities have streets named after him.

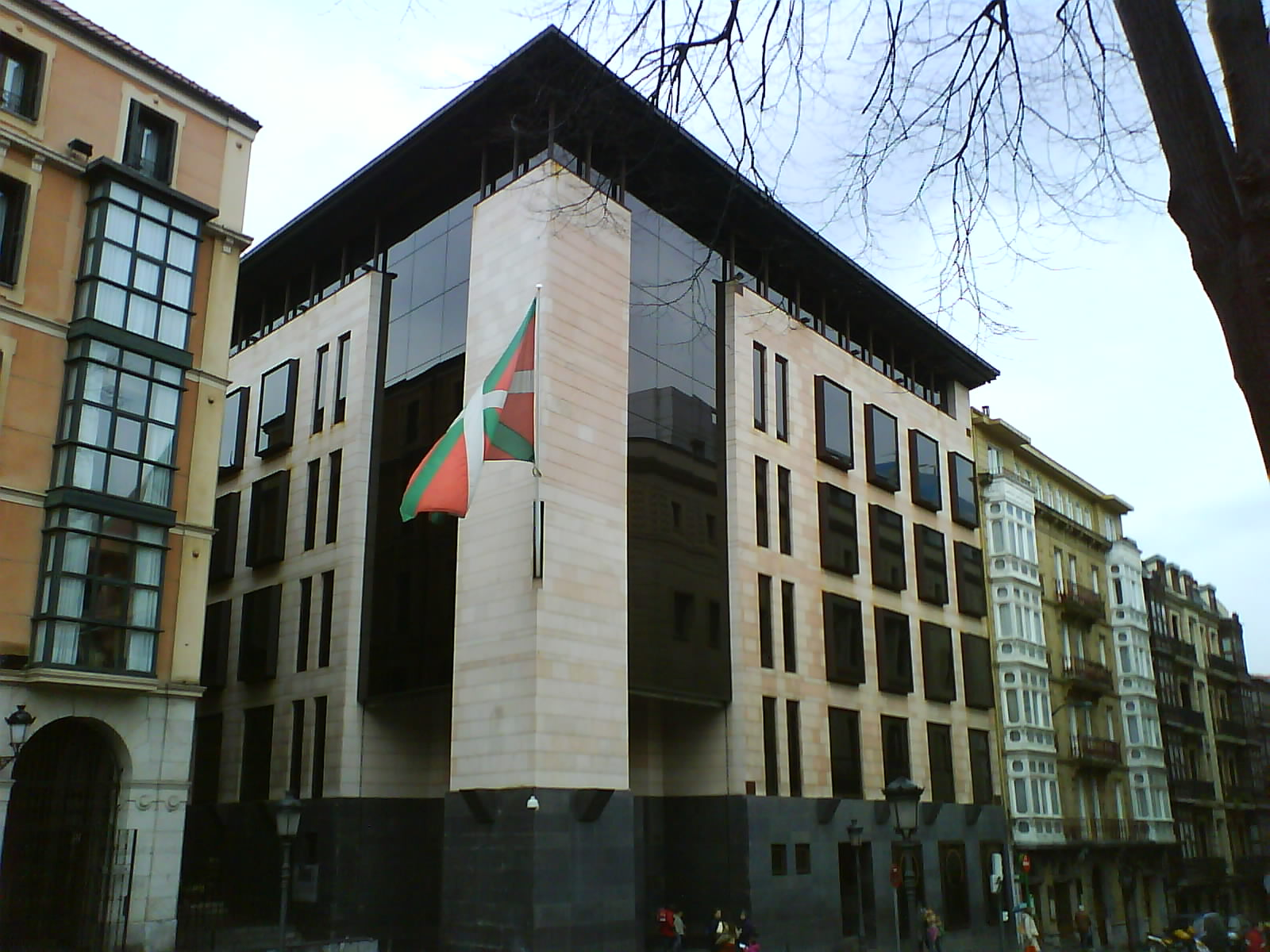
Sabin-Etxea in 2007

The estate of his Abando home is now Sabin-Etxea ("Sabino-House"), the EAJ-PNV headquarters.

Jon Juaristi has remarked that perhaps the most influential part of his heritage is the neologistic list of Basque versions of names in his Deun-Ixendegi Euzkotarra ("Basque saint-name collection", published in 1910). Instead of the traditional adaptations of Romance names, he proposed others he made up and that in his opinion were truer to the originals and adapted to the Basque phonology.

For example, his brother Luis became Koldobika, from Frankish Hlodwig. The traditional Peru, Pello or Piarres ("Peter") became Kepa from Aramaic כיפא (Kepha). He believed that the suffix -[n]e was inherently feminine, and new names like Nekane ("pain"+ne; "Dolores" in Spanish) or Garbine ("clean"+ne, "Immaculate [Conception]") are frequent among Basque females. Even the name of the brother-in-law of the king of Spain is Iñaki Urdangarin, Iñaki being Arana's alternative for Ignatius instead of the Basque traditional Inazio.
