= José Ángel Zubiaur Alegre =

Spanish politician (1918–2012)

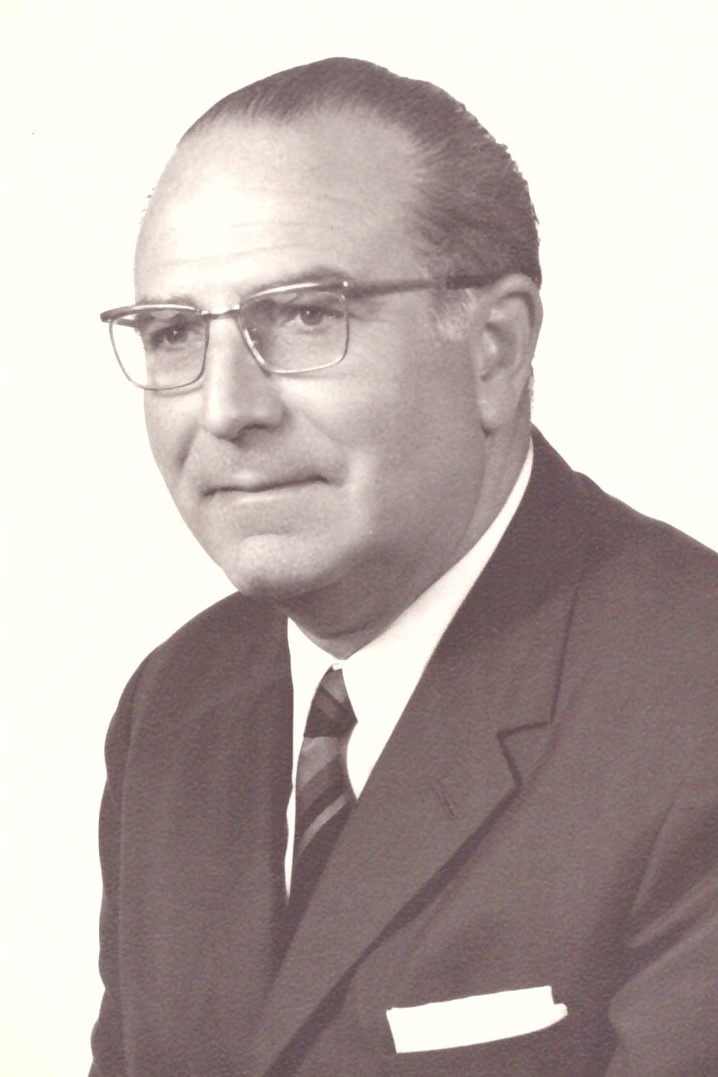
- Born: José Ángel Zubiaur Alegre; 1918; Bilbao, Spain
- Died: 2012 (aged 93–94); Pamplona, Spain
- Occupation: Lawyer
- Known for: Politician
- Political party: Carlism, UPN

José Ángel Zubiaur Alegre (1918–2012) was a Spanish right-wing politician. Throughout most of his life he remained active as a Carlist militant and held some positions in the regional Navarrese party executive. In the 1970s he left the movement and contributed to the birth of a Navarrista party, Unión del Pueblo Navarro. His career climaxed during the Cortes term in 1967–1971, when he strove to liberalize the regime and gained nationwide recognition. In 1948–1951 and 1983–1987 he served also in the regional Navarrese self-government.

== Family and youth ==
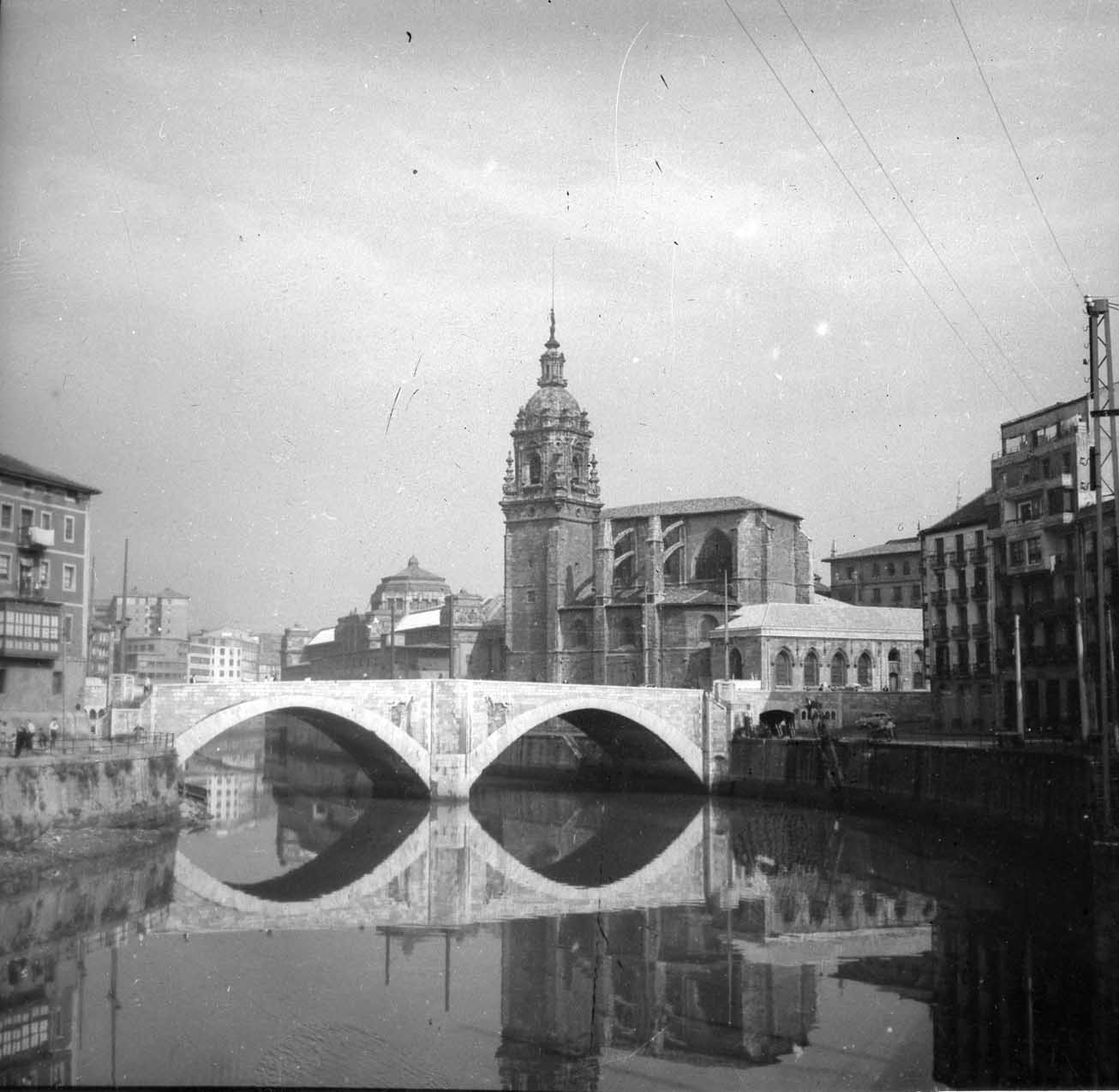
Bilbao

The Basque Zubiaur family has been traditionally related to sea fare; its members appear in medieval records of the Biscay Consulate of the Sea and already in the mid-16th century Zubiaur was considered a very distinguished name. Some of the family members grew to well known Spanish naval commanders and in the early modern era the Zubiaurs were among 10 families most represented in the Bilbao town hall; some held also official positions in the Señorío de Vizcaya. The family got very branched; in the early 19th century one arm emerged within ranks of the Basque petty bourgeoisie. Its descendant was José Ángel's grandfather, Vicente Zubiaur Unzaga, married in Bilbao to María Salazar Gochi. The couple had 7 children; the second oldest one and the oldest son was José Ángel's father, Juan José Zubiaur Salazar (1888–1943). He went on with trading business and set up companies on his own; one specialized in sales and maintenance of various tools, accessories and machinery, another was dealing in import and repair of English automobiles. In 1920–1922 he served as member of the Bilbao ayuntamiento.

In 1890 Zubiaur Salazar married Teresa Alegre Navascués (1893–1975); little is known about her family except that she originated from a Navarrese town of San Martín de Unx. The couple settled in the very centre of Bilbao; they had only one child. At an unspecified time, though probably in the late 1920s, Zubiaur Salazar was interned in the psychiatric hospital in Bermeo; in 1926 his wife and son left Bilbao for San Martin de Unx, where Jose Ángel passed most of his childhood; though a Vizcaino by birth, he developed a strong Navarrese identity. In the late 1920s he entered a Marist school in Pamplona, where he obtained bachillerato during the Republic era. In 1934 Zubiaur enrolled at philosophy and letters at the University of Zaragoza. Outbreak of the Civil War interrupted his academic career; he resumed law studies after the war in Madrid and graduated in philosophy and letters and in law.

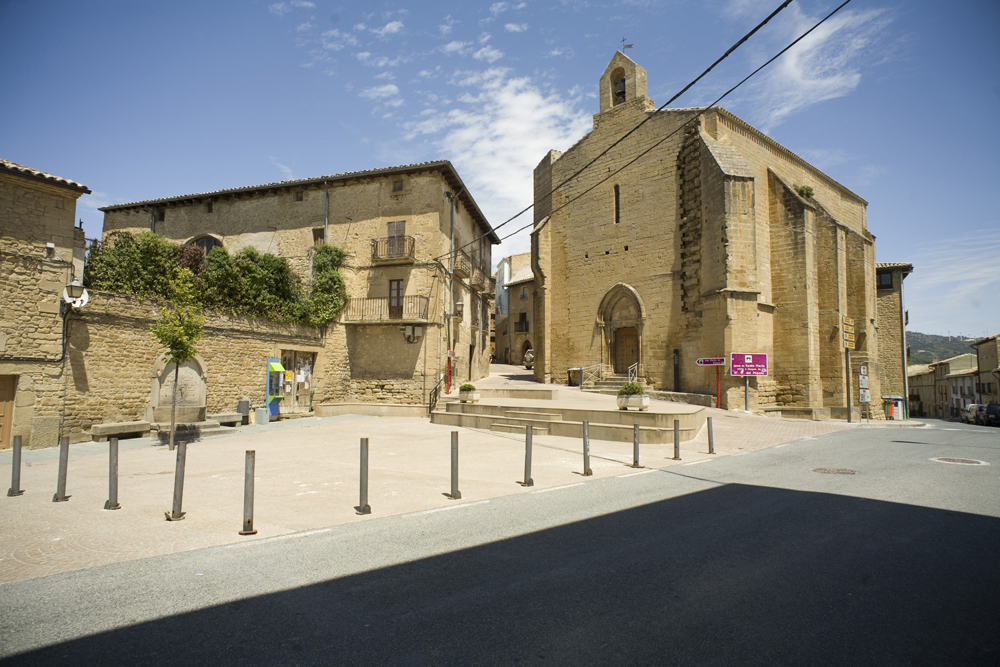
San Martín de Unx

In 1947 Zubiaur married María Josefa Carreño Cima (1918–2015). The couple settled in Pamplona though they used to spend much time in Leitza; they had 7 children, the first one born in 1948. Their marriage endured 65 years; when passing away, Zubiaur had 23 grandchildren. Two of Zubiaur's sons became public figures. The oldest one, José Ángel Zubiaur Carreño, held high administrative and economic offices in the Navarrese self-government and represented Navarre in various central EU bodies; a longtime UPN politician, he left the party in 2013 and assumed more right-wing positions. Francisco Javier Zubiaur Carreño held high jobs related to Navarrese culture and is professor in history of art, author of books related to painting, film and museology; politically he tends to a more progressist stand. Among other notable relatives, Zubiaur's paternal uncle Román Zubiaur Salazar was a fairly popular comic actor, in the early 1920s known as a Basque stage character "Martinchú Perugorría".

== Republic and Civil War ==
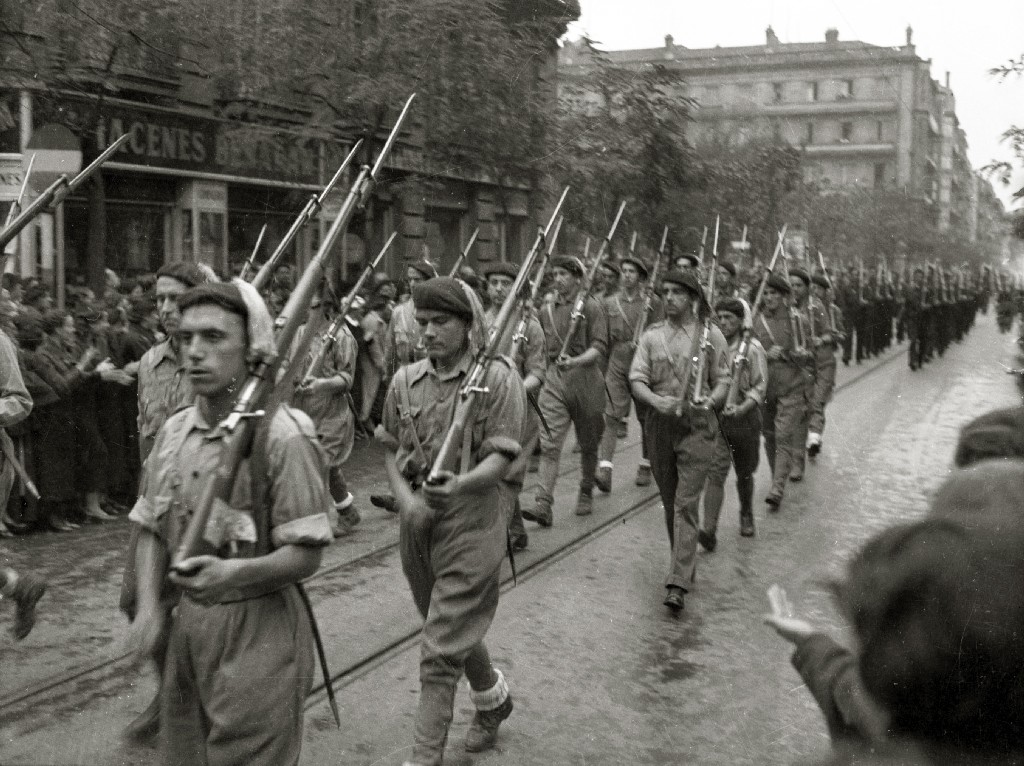
Requetés, 1937

Zubiaur was born to a Carlist family; his father personally knew the claimant Don Jaime and in the early 1910s he was involved in the Miguelist plot in Portugal. José Ángel adopted the Carlist outlook as a natural way of life, especially that also San Martín de Unx was part of the Carlist Navarrese heartland. Already during his early schooling years he was active in Juventudes Jaimistas, a Carlist youth organization; during the Republican period he grew to executive positions within the organization, though information available is confusing. Later Zubiaur admitted having taken part in Traditionalist Pamplonese feasts, though he remained silent on any organizational commitments of the early 1930s. Following the coup of July 1936 he volunteered to the Carlist militia, the requeté, and spent almost three years on the front; he served mostly in one of field companies of Radio Requeté, first in Tercio de Navarra and then in Tercio de Lácar. He survived the Biscay, Santander and Asturias campaigns unharmed, until during the Battle of Teruél he suffered frostbite and had to be treated in the Pamplona hospital. He finished the wartime career as a sergeant.

According to some sources already in early 1937 Zubiaur was engaged in Carlist propaganda activities in the Navarrese rearguard. He apparently complied with the Unification Decree and was incorporated into the new Francoist state party, Falange Española Tradicionalista. In late 1938 he was nominated the provincial Navarrese head of the FET propaganda section and at this role he remained active at least until 1939. Some historians consider him a representative of "carlismo colaboracionista". According to some sources he entered Junta Consultiva Nacional of SEU, the new academic organisation set up by the regime.

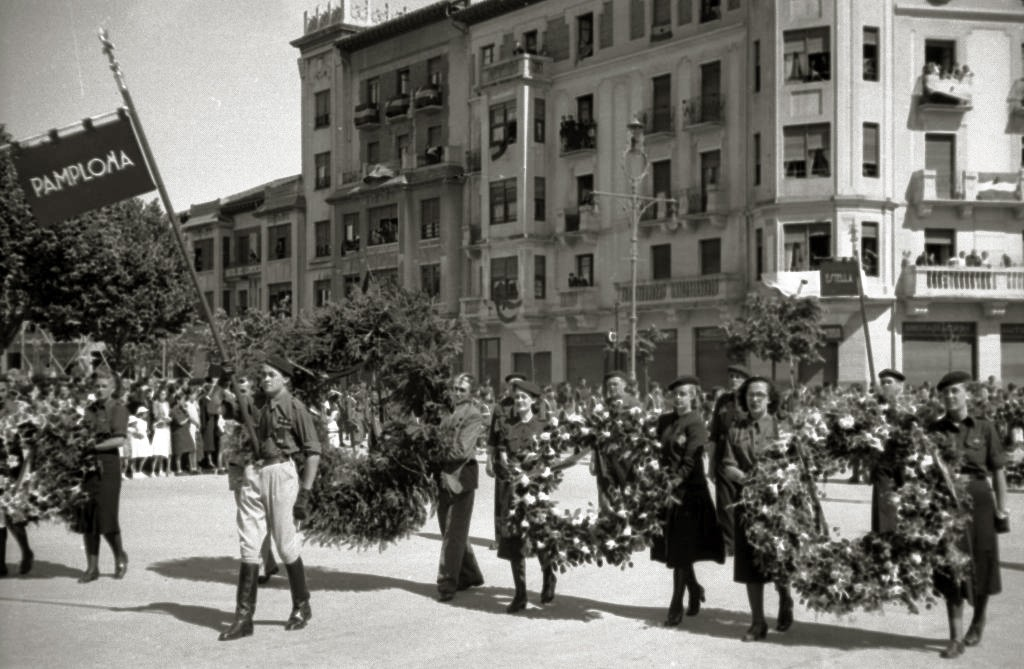
Francoist feast at Plaza del Príncipe de Viana, Pamplona 1939

Though the member of FET, Zubiaur kept considering Manuel Fal Conde his political leader and protested against the exaltation of Falangism at the expense of Traditionalism. He also took advantage of his position in the emerging Francoist structures to cultivate and promote the Carlist outlook. He presided over local feasts to honor the Traditionalist fallen, called for the Carlist kings to be buried at Escorial and at the Navarrese border officially welcomed remnants of general Sanjurjo, to be laid to grave during a solemn funeral ceremony in Pamplona. His most lasting initiative, however, was setting up Hermandad de Caballeros Voluntarios de la Cruz, a hardly veiled Carlist ex-combatant organisation; it was intended as counter-proposal to the official Delegación Nacional de Excombatientes and was to group former requetés only. In 1939 Hermandad helped to launch two periodical Navarrese feasts, formatted as homages to the Traditionalist fallen and demonstrations of Traditionalist principles: a female pilgrimage to the top of Montejurra and a male pilgrimage to the castle of Javier. Supposed to embody "the spirit of July 18", according to later accounts they were intended as dissident manifestations of genuine patriotism, opposed to Francoist distortion of "espíritu de la Cruzada".

== Early Francoism ==
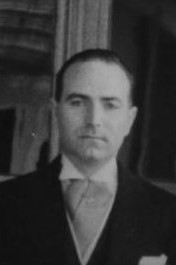
in Diputación, 1949

There is little information on Zubiaur's activity in the early 1940s. It seems that he left the FET propaganda structures; it is not clear whether he spent the years completing his university education in Madrid or remained in Navarre. According to enigmatic accounts he was active in the Carlist academic organisation AET, re-organized Juventud Carlista in Pamplona or worked to re-build the Navarrese structures. According to his own later accounts Zubiaur remained loyal to the Carlist regent Don Javier and indeed in 1946 he was recorded as touring rural Navarre, busy reviving the semi-clandestine Javierista organisation. Prior to first local elections staged in the Francoist Spain Zubiaur engaged in the open Carlist propaganda campaign and was soon appointed as a candidate to the Pamplona city council himself. As a semi-official Carlist contender he stood in a pool named Tercio Familiar and was elected in 1948. As Carlist contingent in the ayuntamiento gained strength, the council delegated him to Diputación Foral, a 7-member Navarrese self-government.

Politically Zubiaur's term as city counselor and provincial deputy is marked mostly by confrontation between the Falangist civil governor, Luis Valero Bermejo, and the Traditionalist municipal and provincial delegates. Some sources note him and Jesús Larrainzar as key opponents of FET in both bodies, others do not mention his name when reconstructing the Carlist-Falangist struggle for power. At Diputación Zubiaur was responsible for culture and education; he took advantage of his position to promote Traditionalism and worked to turn Institución Príncipe de Viana, a provincial cultural and educational centre, into a Carlist outpost. He was also responsible for classes of Basque, sponsored by Diputación and launched despite obstruction mounted by Valero; the courses went on until 1970. Zubiaur's term in the city council expired in 1951; he tried to renew the ticket, but failed. However, Carlists in local structures ensured that in 1952 he was appointed Subdirector de Hacienda de Navarra, the self-governmental economic department; later he would grow to director of the unit.

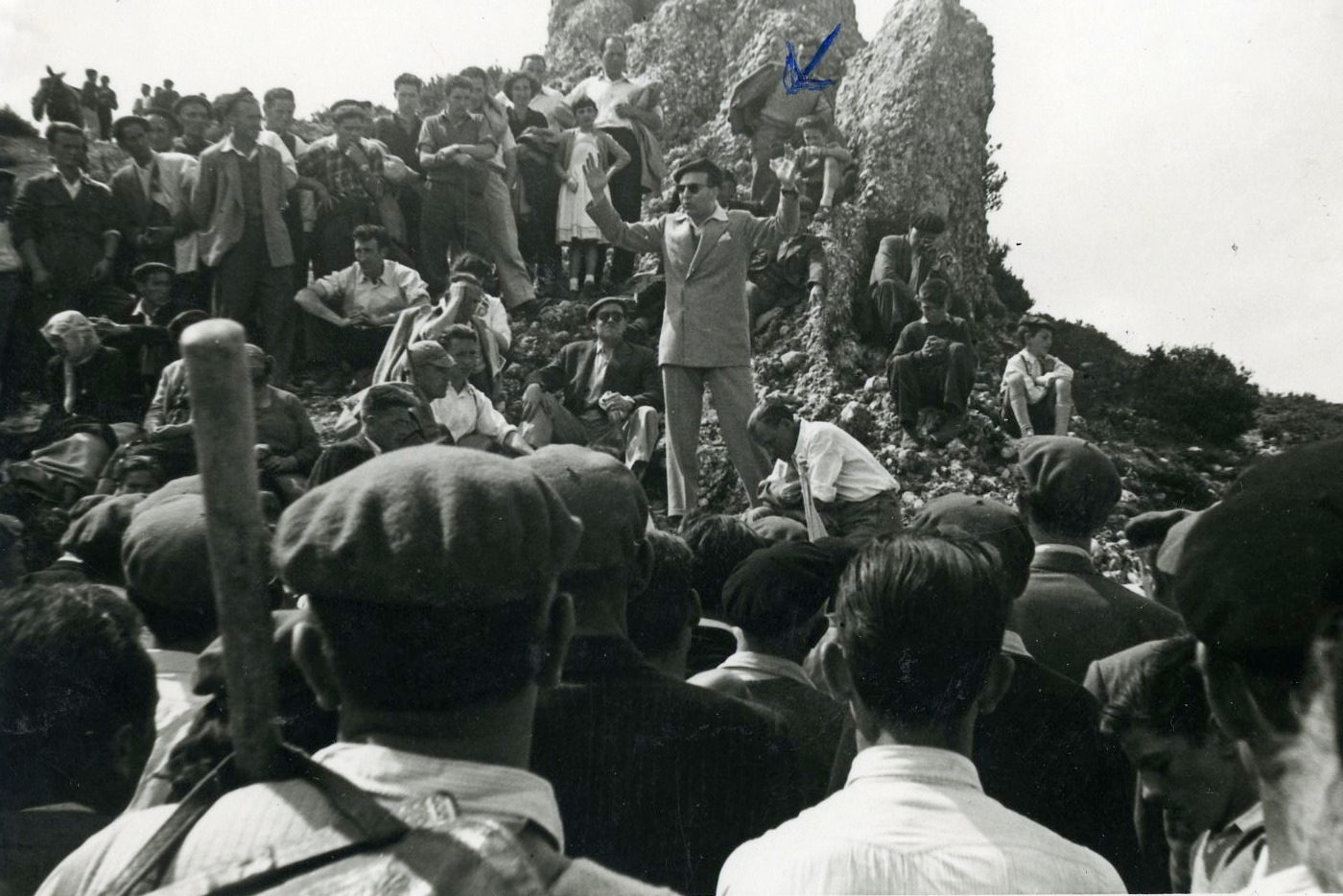
Zubiaur at Montejurra, 1954

In the early 1950s Zubiaur counted among the most anti-regime Navarrese Carlists; some name him "leader of anti-Francoist sector". He was noted delivering intransigent harangues at Montejurra rallies and in 1954 was engaged in launch of a clandestine party bulletin, El Fuerista; according to some authors he was its "redactor principal". The initiative did not go unnoticed by the authorities; despite his professional standing as a lawyer the same year he was repeatedly briefly detained by the security. He emerged as one of key provincial party activists; in 1951 he asked the regent-claimant Don Javier that a new regional executive be formed to replace older, inactive leaders, and later this year got himself appointed to new Junta Regional. In 1953 some proposed that he forms part of Secretariado, a 4-member auxiliary body which would lead buildup of the party structures. In 1956 he was first noted as taking part in Madrid sittings of Consejo Nacional, the nationwide executive of the Carlist organization Comunión Tradicionalista, and came to know his king personally.

== Mid-Francoism ==
Carlist standard

In the mid-1950s the intransigent Carlist policy gave way to a conciliatory course, engineered by the new political leader José María Valiente. Zubiaur was initially counted among the "guipuzcoanos", a hardline faction opposing the new strategy. In 1956 he took part in works of Junta de las Regiones, a somewhat rebellious body contesting the collaborationist policy. Some scholars consider him the leader of the group who challenged Valiente over his firm grip on leadership, denounced as centralizing and anti-fuerista style. When the aging Navarrese jefé Joaquín Baleztena was about to resign, in 1957 the hardliners mounted a scheme to get him replaced by Zubiaur, yet the job eventually went to Valiente's man of confidence, Francisco Javier Astraín. Zubiaur welcomed arrival of prince Carlos Hugo on the Spanish political scene. In 1958 he called to join ranks behind Don Javier and the Borbón-Parmas against any temptations of reconciliation with the Juanistas; speaking at Montejurra in 1959 he demanded unreserved support for Carlos Hugo. In the early 1960s Zubiaur was one of the best recognized Navarrese Carlists; at increasingly massive Montejurra rallies he was the second most frequent speaker after Valiente and in absence of the prince used to read manifestos on his behalf, occasionally delivering addresses also beyond Navarre.

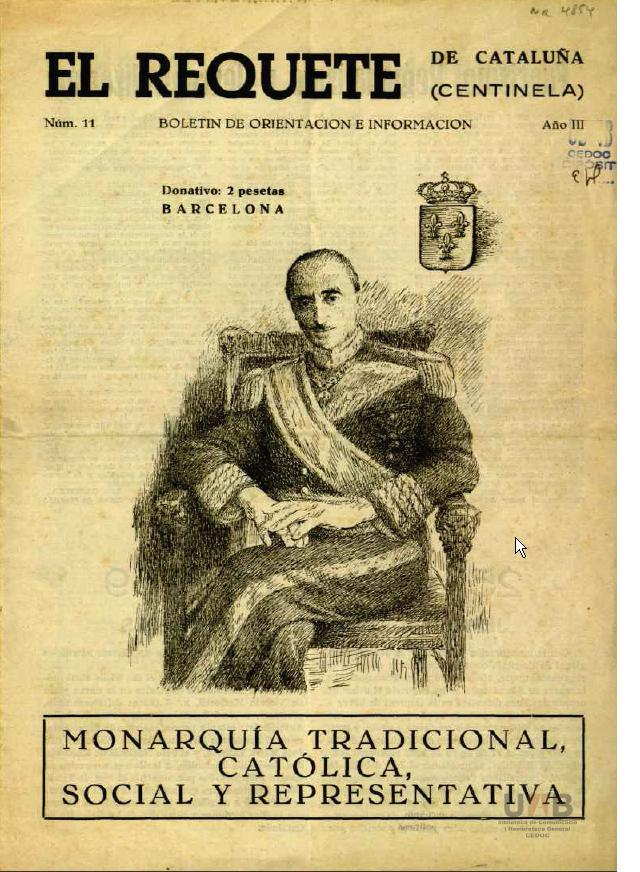
Don Javier as king

When faced with growing conflict between the Traditionalists and the Hugocarlistas he sided with the latter. Impressed by dynamics of the young prince and his sisters, he believed that they were "renewing the pact" between the Carlist people and the Carlist royal family. He did not join skeptics who started to leave the Comunión, kept bombarding Valiente with letters urging re-organisation of the party, published articles demanding total loyalty to the Borbón-Parmas, welcomed the new model of Catholicism forged at Vaticanum II, supported the new policy of consulting the Carlist rank-and-file about the party course and saturated his own public addresses with new phraseology focused on "liberties" and "human personality".

In 1961 Zubiaur was considered a candidate for a new, vasco-navarrese Carlist junta; in 1964 he was confirmed as secretary to the Navarrese executive, still headed by Astraín. Eventually, when Astraín resigned in 1966 he was replaced with a 5-member committee, headed by Zubiaur; the latter was to rebuild the regional organisation that he had been criticizing for years as ineffective. He fully endorsed changes in the Comunión introduced in 1966 as doing away with centralized structure and infusing the fuerista spirit into the organization; in fact, they were intended to fragment power and facilitate Hugocarlista takeover of the party. However, the prince and his entourage did not trust Zubiaur; though they thought him "more modern" than Valiente and the likes, in the mid-1960s they still considered it necessary to manipulate written versions of his public addresses to make them appear more progressive. Zubiaur was not appointed to the new nationwide bodies like a 36-member Consejo Asesor, set up in 1966.

== Late Francoism ==
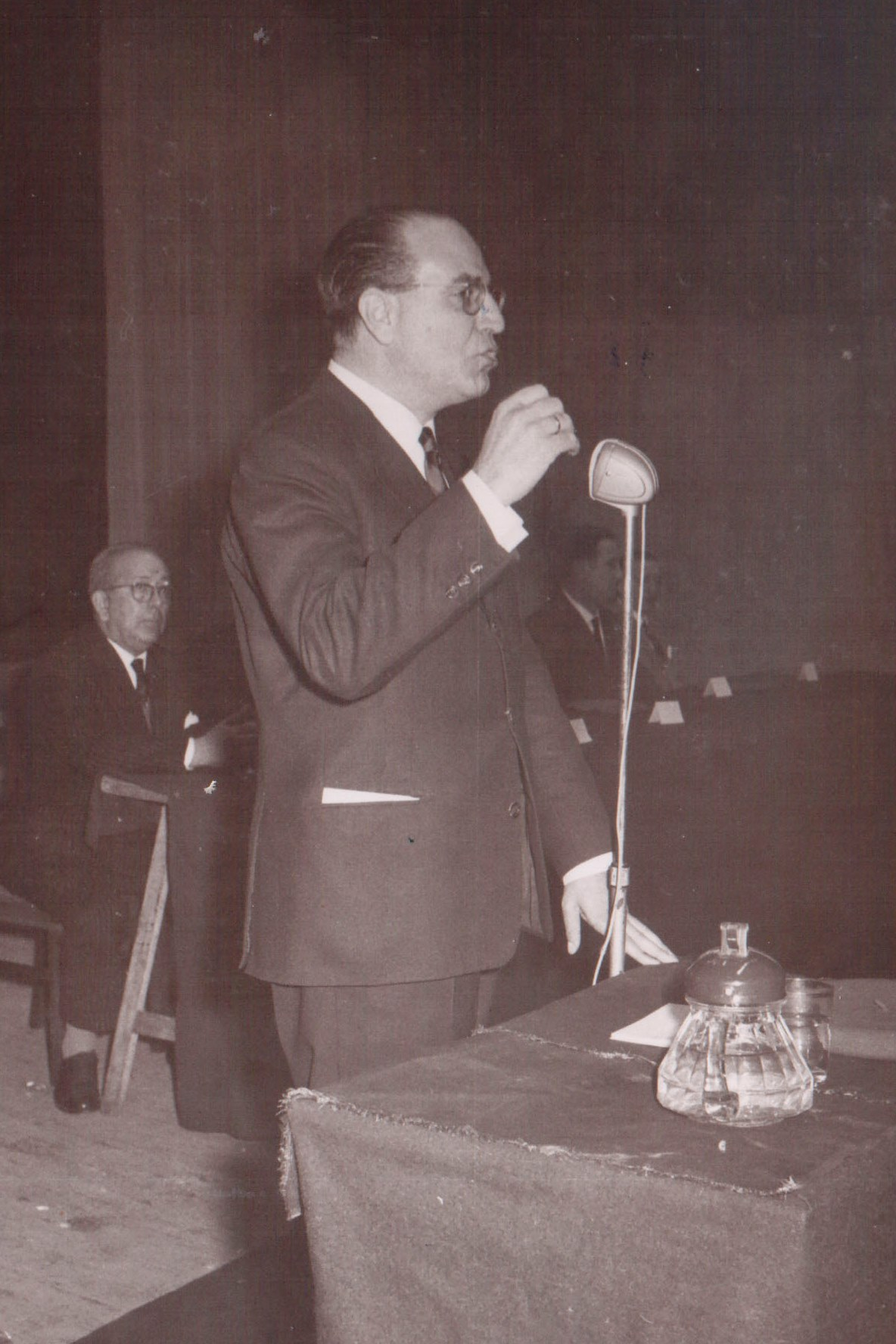
Zubiaur, 1964

In 1967 the Francoist legislation introduced partial and semi-free elections to the Cortes; less than 20% of all deputies, a so-called tercio familiar, were to be chosen by direct vote of heads of families and married women. In Navarre Zubiaur and Auxilio Goñi stood as unofficial Carlist candidates and decisively defeated contenders supported by the administration; they have eventually formed a 4-member informal Traditionalist minority in the chamber. The following 4 years turned to be the period of their hectic parliamentarian activity; it was aimed at dismantling at least some dictatorial features of the regime, opposing new syndicalist designs and promoting more democratic legislation. The initiatives gained attention of nationwide media and were extensively reported in the press, posing more problems for the regime than it might have initially appeared.

Zaubiaur's bid for entry into Comisión Permanente of the diet failed, but he and other Carlist deputies immediately launched public campaign to change the role of the Cortes from "producción de leyes" – i.e. rubber-stamping drafts prepared by administration – into a platform of "effective dialogue" between the people and the government. He then proceeded to suggest a number of changes in internal Cortes rules, almost openly denounced current representation scheme as fictitious, condemned excessive centralism and demanded more weight for tercio familiar. Unable to get adequate hearing, Zubiaur and a handful of other MPs started to stage rump sessions in various locations, the practice which became known as "Cortes transhumantes". It caused great irritation of the administration and was eventually prohibited by minister of interior in 1968, though Zubiaur tried to revive the sessions as late as in 1970.

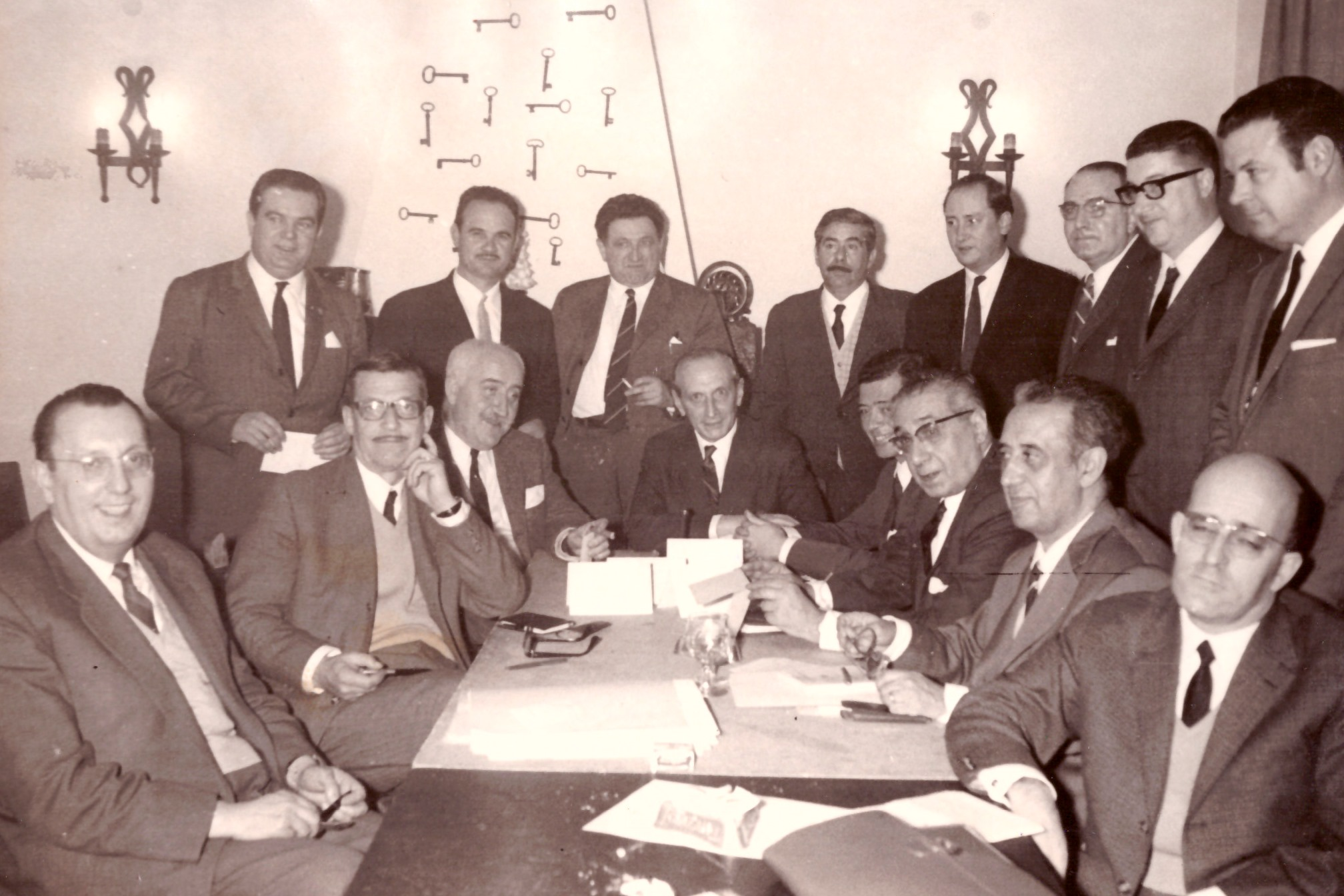
Zubiaur at the sitting of Cortes Transhumantes, 1968

In 1968 Zubiaur and few other deputies campaigned against the draft law on state secrets; outvoted, they opposed the launch of constitutional process for Equatorial Guinea claiming that access to information related was severely restricted. The same year the Carlists demanded re-introduction of separate provincial establishments for Gipuzkoa and Biscay, scrapped in 1937; isolated, during the vote they left the chamber in protest. In 1969 Zubiaur a number of times protested against expulsion of prince Carlos Hugo from Spain and afterwards in presence of Franco cast his vote against designation of prince Juan Carlos as the future king of Spain; the same year he opposed the new "gobierno monocolor". In 1970 he tried to relax the draft of education law to ensure "pluralismo y subsidiaredad" and mounted opposition against the proposed Ley Sindical. In a public debate which took months he stood in defense of syndicalist "pluralismo asociativo a ultranza". Perfectly aware of his minoritarian position Zubiaur – dubbed "el viejo zorro carlista" – approached the legislative exercise as means of stirring public opposition and using the rules of the regime to dismantle it from within. In 1970 and 1971 he mounted another fierce campaign against the draft Ley de Orden Público and in favor of new electoral legislation. When his Cortes term expired in 1971 Zubiaur was recognized far beyond Navarre and far beyond the Carlist realm.

== Breakup ==
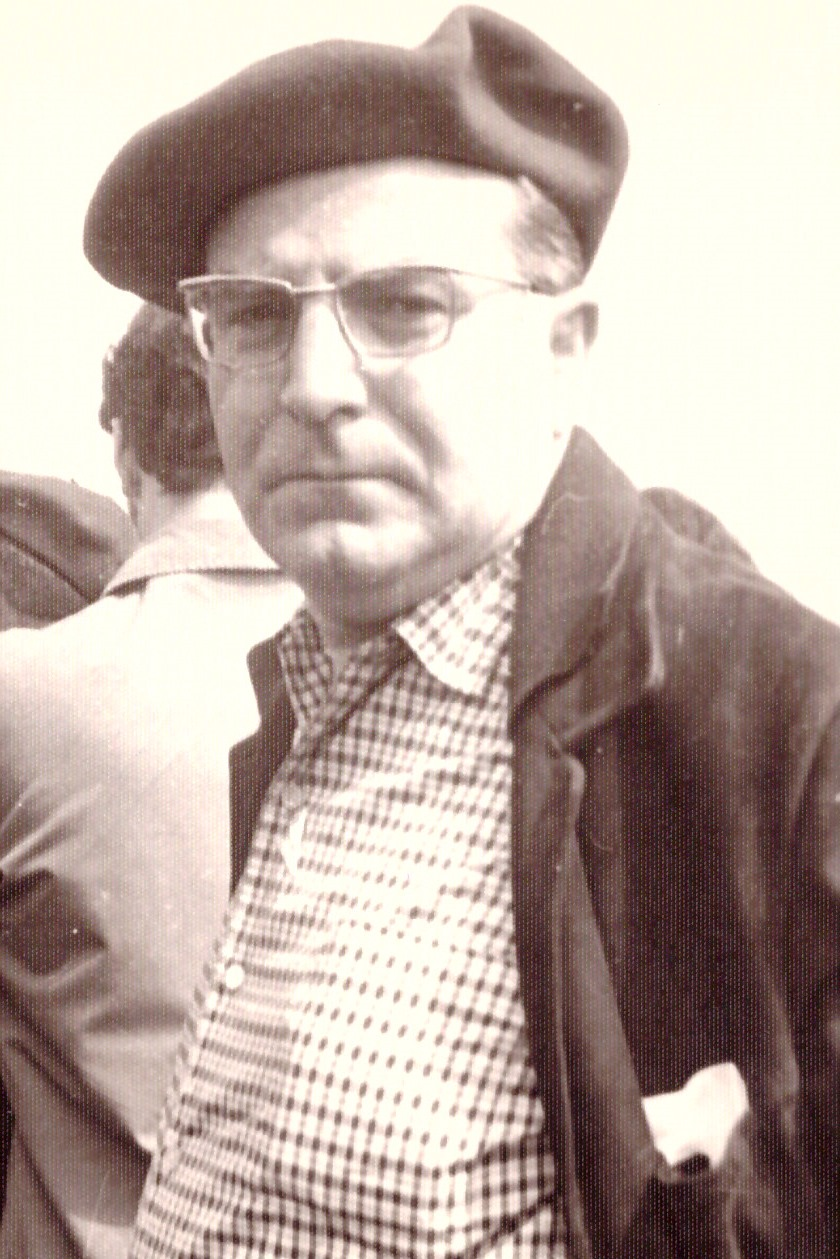
Zubiaur, 1969

In the late 1960s Zubiaur seemed fully aligned with the Hugocarlistas. He got appointed to a 4-member Consejo Real, was hailed by Hugocarlista press as embodiment of a "spirit of dialogue", toured Carlist princes across Spain, remained in the Navarrese party executive and saw off expulsed Don Javier to the French border. His 1969 address at Montejurra was particularly belligerent; it was branded subversive by the security and earned him a massive, 50,000 ptas fine. In 1970 he was among the party heavyweights invited to Lignières, where Carlos Hugo presented his newly born son. The same year Zubiaur was appointed to Gabinete Ideológico, a body set up to preside over modernization of Carlism, and joined its foral commission; moreover, he suggested that Pedro José Zabala, the party champion of progressism, gets appointed as head of the Gabinete. He opposed the Traditionalist re-claim of El Pensamiento Navarro. At the time when Hugocarlistas were increasingly embracing socialist rhetoric, in 1971 Zubiaur tried to mediate during strike at the Pamplona Eaton Ibérica plant and accepted by the workers, was rejected by the management. As member of Carlist Junta de Gobierno he co-signed a lengthy manifiesto which demanded political liberties and vaguely pointed to "Federación de las Repúblicas Sociales". Some scholars claim that Zubiaur significantly contributed to modernization of Carlism.

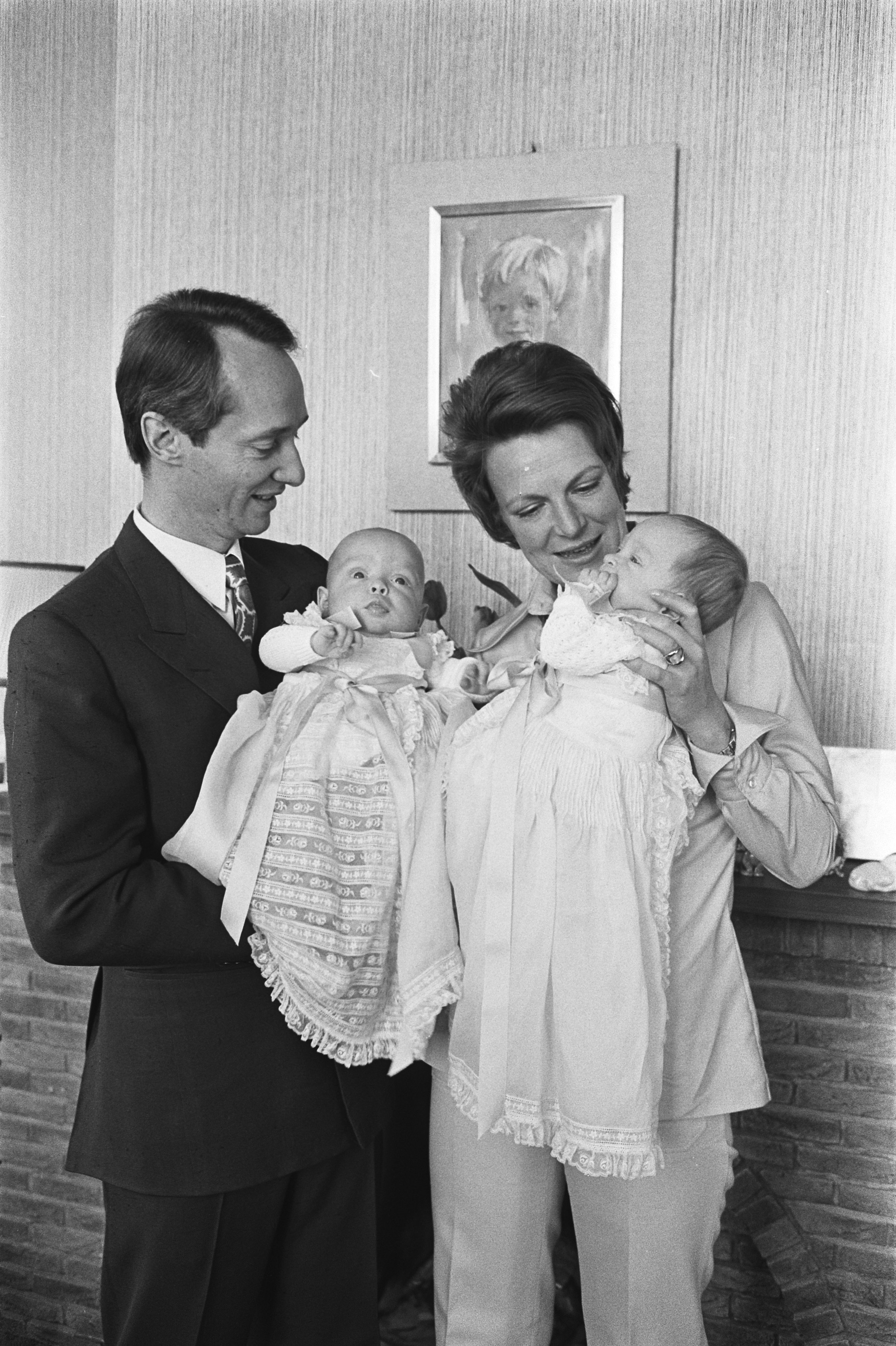
Don Carlos Hugo with his wife Irene and children, mid-1970s

Nothing is known about Zubiaur's unease about increasingly left-wing stand of Carlos Hugo, though the prince did not trust him and some Hugocarlista ideologues tried to instruct Zubiaur on principles of the new Carlism. In course of the 1971 electoral campaign to the Cortes he and Goñi seemed obvious party candidates, yet at one point the Borbón-Parmas asked them to sign an undated resignation letter, to be filed in the Cortes in case they lose trust of the claimant. Enraged and humiliated both Goñi and Zubiaur refused, though they agreed to endorse their replacements. This did not amount to total breakup; in 1972 Zubiaur defended in court the Hugocarlista youth from the terrorist GAC organisation, charged with attempt to sabotage Franco's radio address. However, he did not take part in massive rallies staged in Southern France as "congresses of Carlist people", which led to transformation of Comunión Tradicionalista into Partido Carlista. In 1973 he openly complained about totalitarian schemes ruling within the new party. In 1974 together with some other ex-MPs he was already working to set up a quasi-party as permitted by new Francoist legislation on political associations; it was rumored to be flavored with Carlism and regionalism.

In early 1975 the senile Don Javier abdicated in favor of Don Carlos Hugo; this prompted many Traditionalists to challenge the latter with an ultimative letter, demanding confirmation of orthodox Carlist principles. Zubiaur is not listed among the signatories; however, as they had received no reply, he co-signed a second letter. Pointing to the so-called "double legitimacy theory" the document denied Don Carlos Hugo any Carlist credentials and marked Zubiaur's ultimate political breakup with the Borbón-Parmas.

== Transición ==
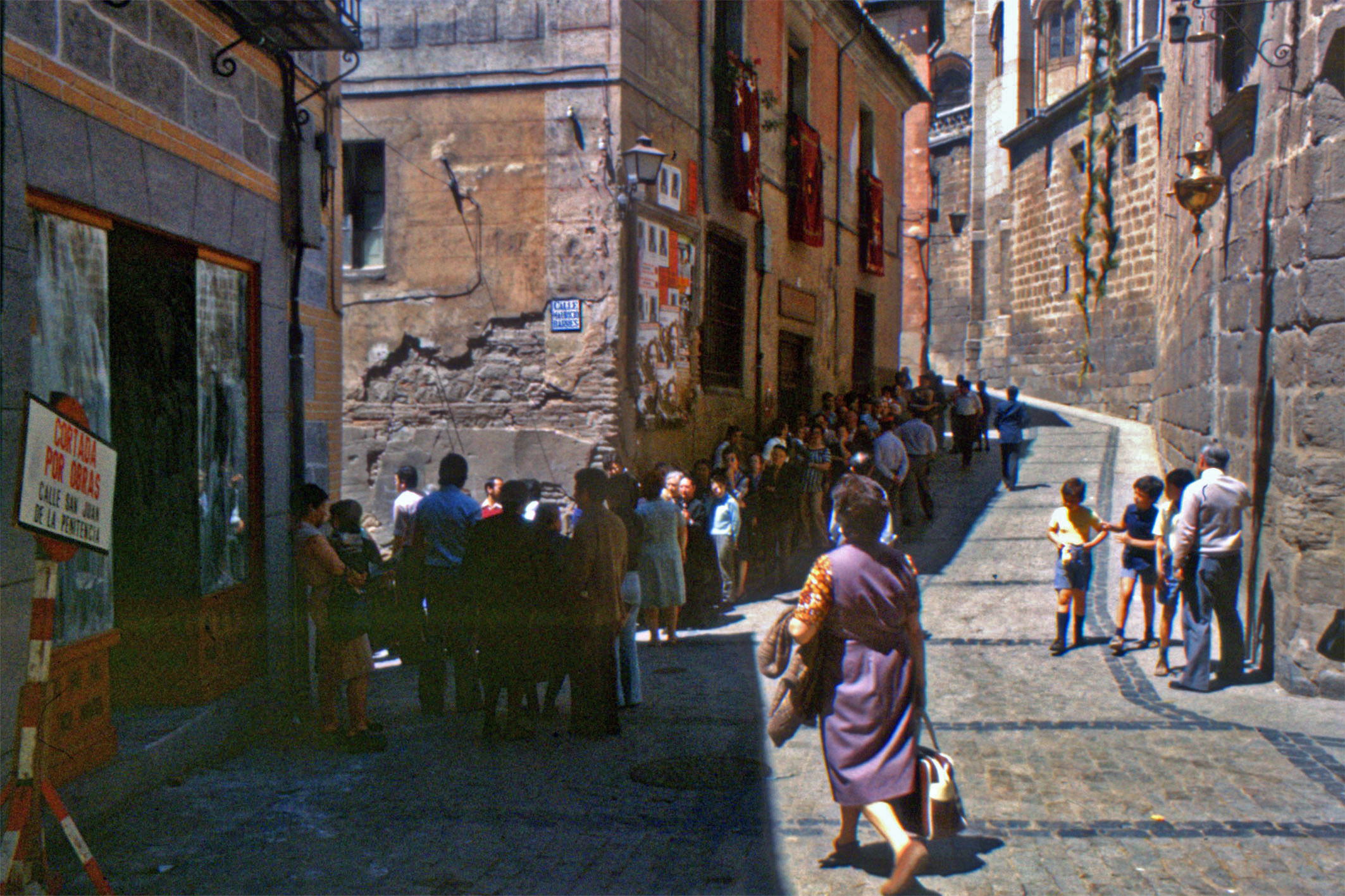
elections in Spain, 1977

Zubiaur did not join efforts of Traditionalists like Zamanillo or Valiente, who tried to set up a Carlist political association. Following the death of Franco he contributed to the series of lectures named "conferencias de Larraona" which in turn gave birth to Frente Navarro Independiente. The party comprised various heterogeneous groupings including the local socialists; Zubiaur and the Carlists he tried to place in the organisation formed its right wing. FNI formally emerged in 1977. He was initially considered a candidate for the Cortes campaign but resigned over internal differences and soon left FNI altogether. He toured the country evaluating opportunities to build a new formation and later described himself as "a widower of Carlism, who tries to find a mother for his children".

The new constitution opened path for incorporation of Navarre into a future autonomous Basque region. Zubiaur suggested to PNV leaders that Navarre is united with Vascongadas in one autonomous unit given ikurriña is not adopted as its standard and "Euskadi" is not adopted as its name. Once the proposal was rejected he felt compelled to defend regional identity against the Basque designs, the task he was well positioned to undertake as recognized expert on Navarrese foral regulations, author of numerous booklets, more systematic works and since 1977 as member of Consejo de Estudios de Derecho Navarro. In 1979 together with other centre-right politicians Zubiaur set up Unión del Pueblo Navarro, a party focused on protection of Navarrese self against the Basque nationalism and on loyalty to Christian values against the secularization tide. He entered the 8-member Comité Ejecutivo of UPN and turned to be one of its most active militants. He was touring Navarrese towns and villages during the electoral campaign, though his own bid for Senate failed. Zubiaur was also among key men forging the electoral strategy, which included rejection of alliances with other parties; with some 15% of votes UPN emerged as the third political force in Navarre.

UPN logotype

In the early 1980s UPN overtook UCD and with some 25% of votes cast in Navarre it was second only to PSOE. At that time Zubiaur, whose term in the party executive expired in 1981, was engaged mostly in debate on reform of formal regulations and remained among the key party pundits, actively speaking in public e.g. when denouncing the ETA campaign of violence. In 1983 he was elected to the Navarrese parliament and soon he became the protagonist of a legal debate which because of its potentially grave constitutional impact kept occupying the Spanish media for months. He was 4 times rejected by PSOE deputies as candidate for premiership of the Navarrese self-government, yet the socialists were unable to field their own competitor. As a way out of the deadlock the parliament president submitted Zubiaur's candidature for approval to Madrid anyway. The government directed the case to the Constitutional Tribunal, which in 1984 declared Zubiaur's appointment invalid and opened path for election of a socialist counter-candidate, Gabriel Urralburu.

== Last years ==
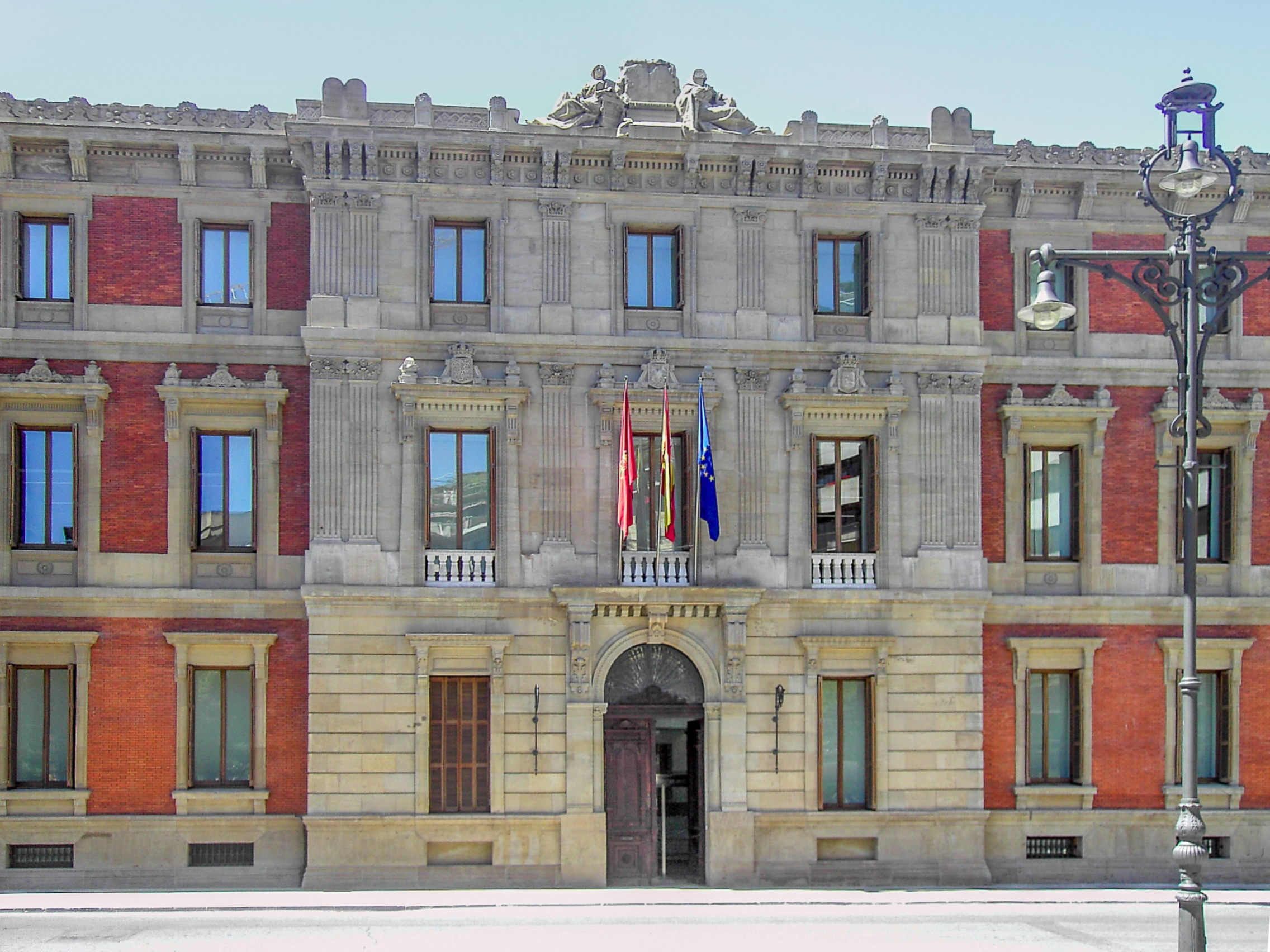
site of Navarrese parliament

From 1983 till 1987 Zubiaur served as the UPN deputy in the Navarrese parliament, active in Comision de Regimen Foral, Comisión de Educación y Cultura, Comisión de Industria, Comercio y Turismo and Comisión de Control Parliamentario de Ente Publico Radio Television Navarra. During his terms he kept standing for centre-right Navarrismo, still fiercely pitted against the Basque nationalism. One of his most lasting initiatives is foundation of Universidad Pública de Navarra, which as member of the Education Committee he promoted and formatted as a publicly funded school. He was also active in a number of regional bodies, e.g. serving as president of Junta Superior de Educación, and in commercial companies controlled by the self-government, e.g. as member of consejo de administración of Caja de Ahorros de Navarra.

In the late 1980s Zubiaur turned 70 and was already a political retiree. However, occasionally he was rumored to be appointed as a Navarrese deputy to the Senate, especially that in the late 1980s UPN overtook PSOE and became the first political power in Navarre. His position within the party was this of a prestigious patriarch, though at times he got involved in an increasingly visible confrontation between the intransigent Jesús Aizpún Tuero and the more conciliatory Juan Cruz Alli Aranguren; Zubiaur supported the latter and he was counted among members of "plataforma renovadora". Prior to the anticipated deadlock at the IV UPN Congress of 1993 he unexpectedly declared himself ready to run for the party leadership, greeted by the press as "histórico Zubiaur"; he ran indeed, but his 339 votes gained proved no match for 1,444 votes of Aizpún and he did not even make it to the party Comité Ejecutivo.

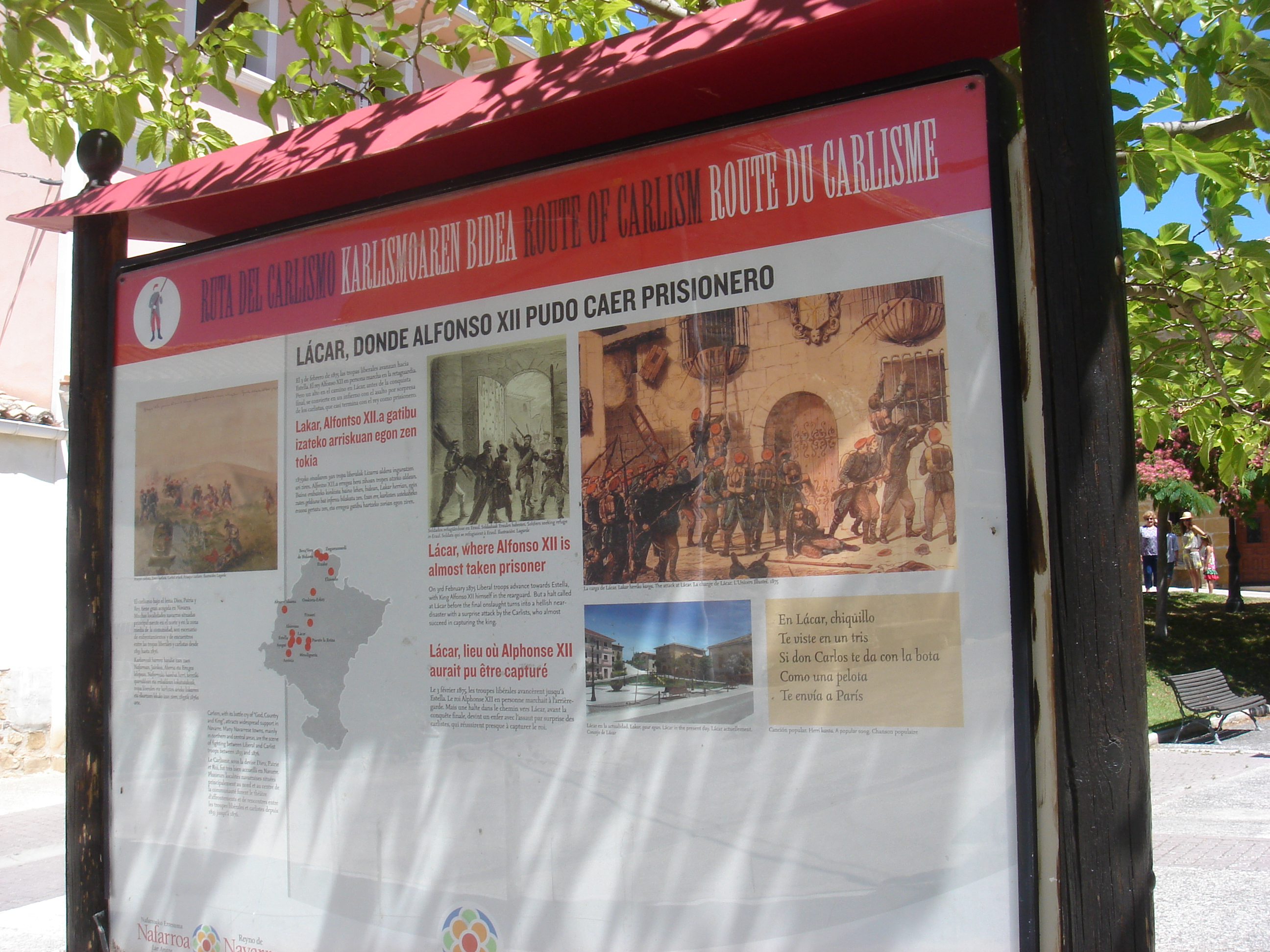
Carlism as a tourist attraction

Since the mid-1990s Zubiaur withdrew from politics, though not entirely from public life; profoundly religious, he remained active in various Catholic organizations like Hermandad de la Pasión and voiced out in favor of Christian values and Christian family; he also kept working on his memoirs. He retained Traditionalist outlook and sentiment for Carlism, presented as a romantic, gallant and idealistic commitment from the past; however, in 2001 he considered the movement already dead. All he could have wished for was that Carlism be "at least remembered", the stance by some described as "extreme pessimism". According to few accounts he remained "integrista irreconcilable" who neared the Carlist branch led by Don Sixto, yet in 2010, when in wheelchair assisting in opening of Museum of Carlism in Estella, he seemed on amicable terms with Don Carlos Hugo and his son Don Carlos Javier, whom he had greeted as a newborn baby 40 years earlier in Lignières. In his last interview, given some 13 months before death, he appeared a serene and cheerful man.

== See also ==
- Traditionalism (Spain)
- Carlism
- Navarrese People's Union
- Navarrismo
