= Jesús Larrainzar Yoldi =

Spanish politician (1907–1970)

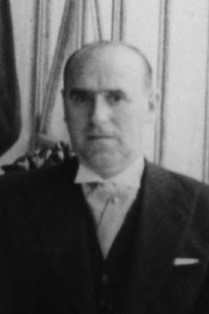
- Born: Jesús Larrainzar Yoldi; 1907; Estella, Spain
- Died: 1970 (aged 62–63); Pamplona, Spain
- Occupation: lawyer
- Known for: politician, civil servant
- Political party: Carlism

Jesús Larrainzar Yoldi (1907–1970) was a Spanish politician and official, related mostly to his native Navarre. Politically he supported the Carlist cause; in the 1930s he formed part of the mainstream Traditionalism, yet in the 1940 he assumed a somewhat factious stand. His career climaxed in 1949–1952, when Larrainzar was member of the Navarrese self-government, Diputación Foral; at this position he confronted the Falangist line of the civil governor. In 1955-1961 he formed part of Consejo Foral Administrativo and in 1968-1970 of Tribunal Administrativo Delegado, two provincial auxiliary bodies. In 1948-1952 he served as mayor of his native Estella.

== Family and youth ==
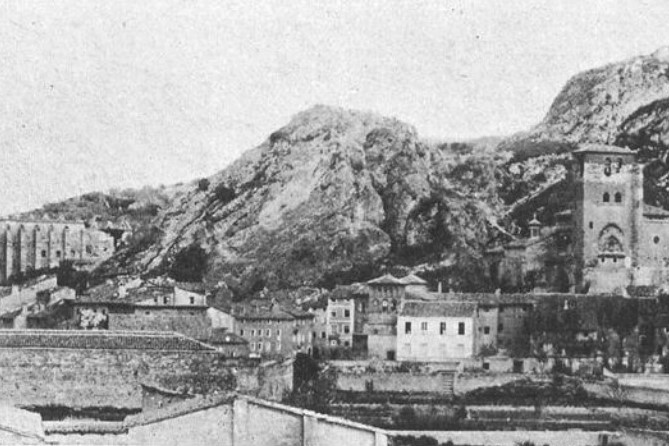
Estella, early 20th c.

The surname of Larrainzar has been first recorded in Gipuzkoa in the Medieval Era, yet few family representatives gained moderate recognition in Navarre, including Estella, in the late 18th century. There is no information on distant ancestors of Jesús available, except that his paternal and maternal grandparents were related to Estella. His father, Nicanor Larrainzar Senosiáin (1863–1918), a juvenile combatant of the Third Carlist War, became a lawyer; he practiced in Estella and since the 1890s he performed various roles in the city council, in 1905-1907 serving as alcalde. He emerged as a recognizable personality in entire Navarre, mostly in relation to his stand in defense of regional fueros and when confronting the emerging Basque nationalism.

In 1902 Larrainzar Senosiáin married Elena Yoldi Berruete (died 1962), daughter to an abogado of Estella and a former councilor, Felipe Yoldi Barbarín; the Larrainzar and Yoldi families have already been inter-related. The couple lived in their native city; it is not clear how many children they had, yet it is known that Jesús had at least 2 brothers, Eusebio and Ricardo, and at least 2 sisters, Angela and Beatriz. As a teenager Jesús received his schooling education at Instituto de Pamplona, and in 1920 he obtained its "matricula de honor", though in the "ensañanza no oficial" mode. At unspecified time, though probably in the mid-1920s, he commenced studying law; it is unclear whether like his father he entered the University of Zaragoza, or pursued the academic path elsewhere. He graduated in law either in 1928 or shortly afterwards. In 1931 Larrainzar was admitted to Colegio de Abogados de Estella and commenced his professional career; apart from private practice, he followed in the footsteps of his late father serving in the flour mill La Industrial Fernández S.A. and in the bus company La Estellesa S.A; he would hold the vice-presidency of the latter until his death.

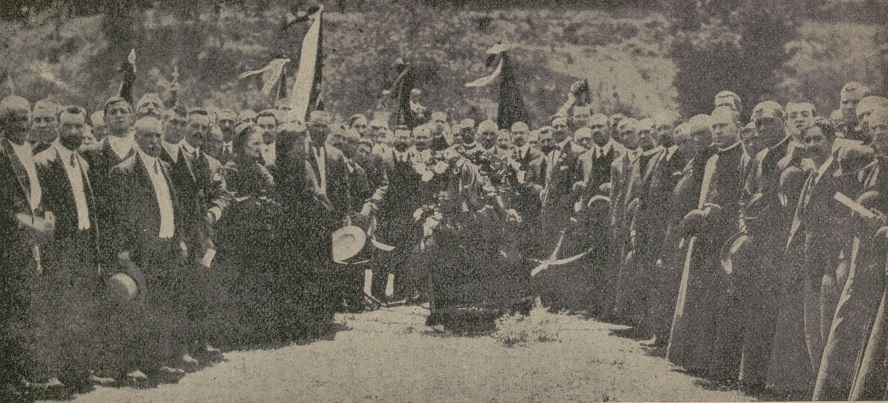
Carlist observance, Estella 1912

Larrainzar has not married and had no children. His best known relative is his younger brother Ricardo Larrainzar Yoldi; in the early 1960s he served as the United Nations expert on self-government in Colombia, published a related book, practiced as lawyer in Cuenca and later held some roles in Servicio Forestal; in the mid-1970s he was among founders of Unión Nacional Española and in 1999 published another book, containing his wartime recollections. His son and Jesús' nephew Ricardo Larrainzar Zaballa was a high local and central official, subgobernador civil of Madrid (1980) and the last civil governor of Asturias (1981–82); he played some role in suppression of the 1981 coup. Jesús' maternal half-uncle, Antonio Yoldi San Martín, became a religious and in the 1900s and 1910s he gained some local recognition as the moving spirit behind first agricultural trade unions in Navarre.

== Carlist against Republic ==
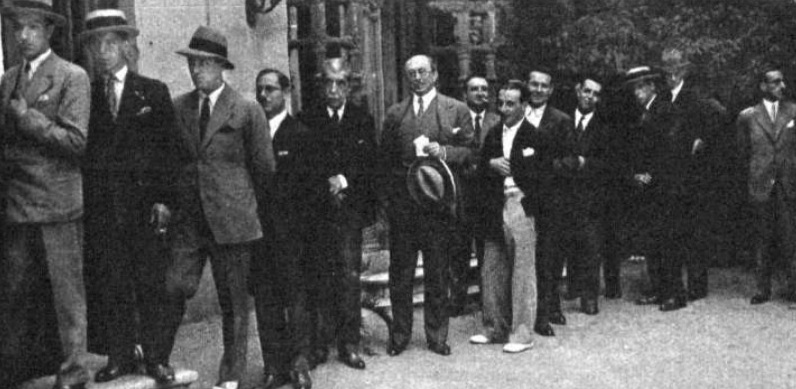
1931 election (sample from Madrid)

Both Larrainzar's parents were Carlists. During the Third Carlist War his father as an 11-year-old boy escaped from home to join legitimist troops, following defeat spent some time on exile and upon return was member of Junta Regional Legitimista of Navarre and president of Junta Directiva of Círculo de Estella; in the movement he emerged as a somewhat divisive figure. His mother was presiding over the local branch of the Carlist female organization, Margaritas. Also their children were brought up in Traditionalist spirit; all 3 sons would later serve in the Carlist paramilitary, Requeté. Jesús was first recorded as active in the movement in his mid-20s; during the first republican electoral campaign of 1931 he labored to mobilize support for the right-wing list, e.g. by co-organizing meetings and speaking himself. He was active in the youth Carlist organization Juventudes Tradicionalistas and as delegate of the Estella merindad he entered its regional Navarrese executive.

During the early 1930s Larrainzar remained active in the local Estellese Carlist structures; in 1932 he was recorded as speaking in Círculo Carlista in Estella, in 1933 delivered an address in Oteiza de la Solana near Estella, and in 1934 in Lerín, also in the merindad of Estella. Also in 1934 he rose to president of the Carlist executive in city, which given Estella's historical role and its current weight in the movement amounted to reaching a notable position within the Navarrese Traditionalism. During the Navarrese 1935 commemorative rally marking the centenary of death of Zumalacárregui, Larrainzar represented Estella. However, he did not enter the regional Junta and played no role in national Carlist politics.

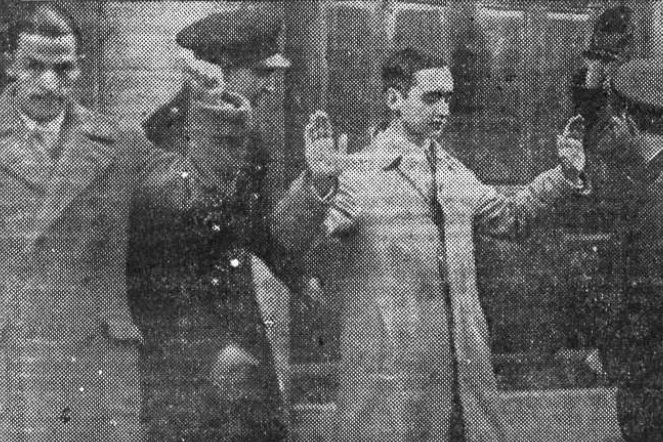
1936 election, requetés and asaltos

None of the works consulted indicates whether and if yes to what extent Larrainzar was involved in Carlist anti-republican conspiracy of 1936; a fairly detailed account of paramilitary buildup of Requeté in Navarre does not list him among local leaders. Sources provide somewhat conflicting information as to his position during the July coup, unfolding in the region. One author claims he entered the regional Carlist wartime executive, where he represented the Estella county: "vocal por la merindad de Estella de la Junta General de Guerra de la Región de Navarra del Partido Carlista, nombrada el 20 de julio de 1936, en la que participaba junto a Jesús Barbarin y Jaime Balanzategui". However, another author claims that in the Navarrese executive, named Junta Central Carlista de Guerra de Navarra, it was Martínez de Morentin who stood for Estella, while Larrainzar entered the 3-member Estella county executive, Junta de Guerra de Merindad de Estella, with Jesús Barbarin as its president.

== Civil War ==
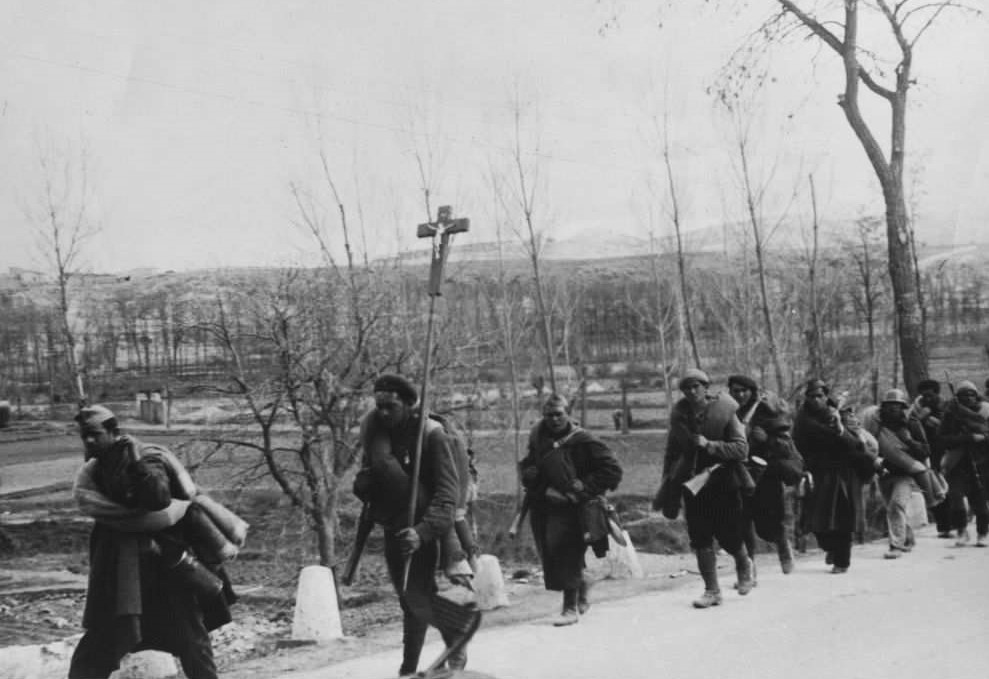
requeté unit on the march, civil war

Larrainzar's activity during early months of the war is unclear; a monographic work does not mention him as involved in repressive Carlist structures in Navarre, active in particular during the summer and autumn of 1936. Sometime around October he emerged as a leading figure within a group of some 150-200 men, coming from central Navarre, most of them above the usual conscription age. They adopted the name of Compañía de Nuestra Señora del Puy de Estella and formed part of the Carlist volunteer militia, requetés; Larrainzar was appearing as its capitán. The group was well-organized, with own estado mayor, a chaplain, medical and reconnaissance sub-units; however, they had few if any firearms. In October and in anticipation of the imminent fall of Madrid they kept bombarding general Mola with requests, asking for an assignment. They suggested vigilance duties or propaganda tasks like construction of street altars or forming music bands; these proposals usually remained unanswered.

On November 7, 1936, the group departed Estella in a train, and via Vitoria they reached Ávila, all in the Nationalist rear. Having disembarked by various means Larrainzar and his group made it to Leganés, at the time headquarters or general Varela and located almost on the frontline, 11 kilometers from Puerta del Sol. There they spent a few weeks with no particular assignment, performing loose vigilance tasks, in drills, organizing and attending religious service, etc. In late November they were delivered a truckload of carbines, but most of them unserviceable. December passed with no military action, even though they were visited by Varela and the colonels García-Escámez and Rada. Eventually in January 1937 the unit was disbanded. Younger members were incorporated into existent or being-formed Carlist battalions, mostly Tercio de Cristo Rey, while older men - including Larrainzar - returned home. It appears he has not taken part in any combat.

Carlist standard

There is scarce information on later Larrainzar's activity during the war. One source claims he was nominated Jefe de Requetés de Estella; as such he performed various administrative, recruitment and propaganda tasks, with no taking part in repression mentioned. At the time he appeared in the rank of a capitán. In February 1937 he represented Estella in Asamblea Extraordinaria de la Comunión Tradicionalista Navarra, a meeting organized to discusses the perspective of enforced amalgamation into a uniform state party. Carlist leaders were deeply divided about the stand to be adopted; most Navarrese opted for compliance, yet it is unclear what the position assumed by Larrainzar was. A monographic work which discussed the later unification process does not list him either as promoter or dissident, yet in late 1937 he appeared at a rally, organized by the newly created Falange Española Tradicionalista, in Estella. The meeting was about agriculture and farming organizations in Navarre, in typical Falangist fashion highly flavored with the syndicalist spirit. There is no information available on Larrainzar during 1938 and final months of the war.

== Carlist against Falangism ==
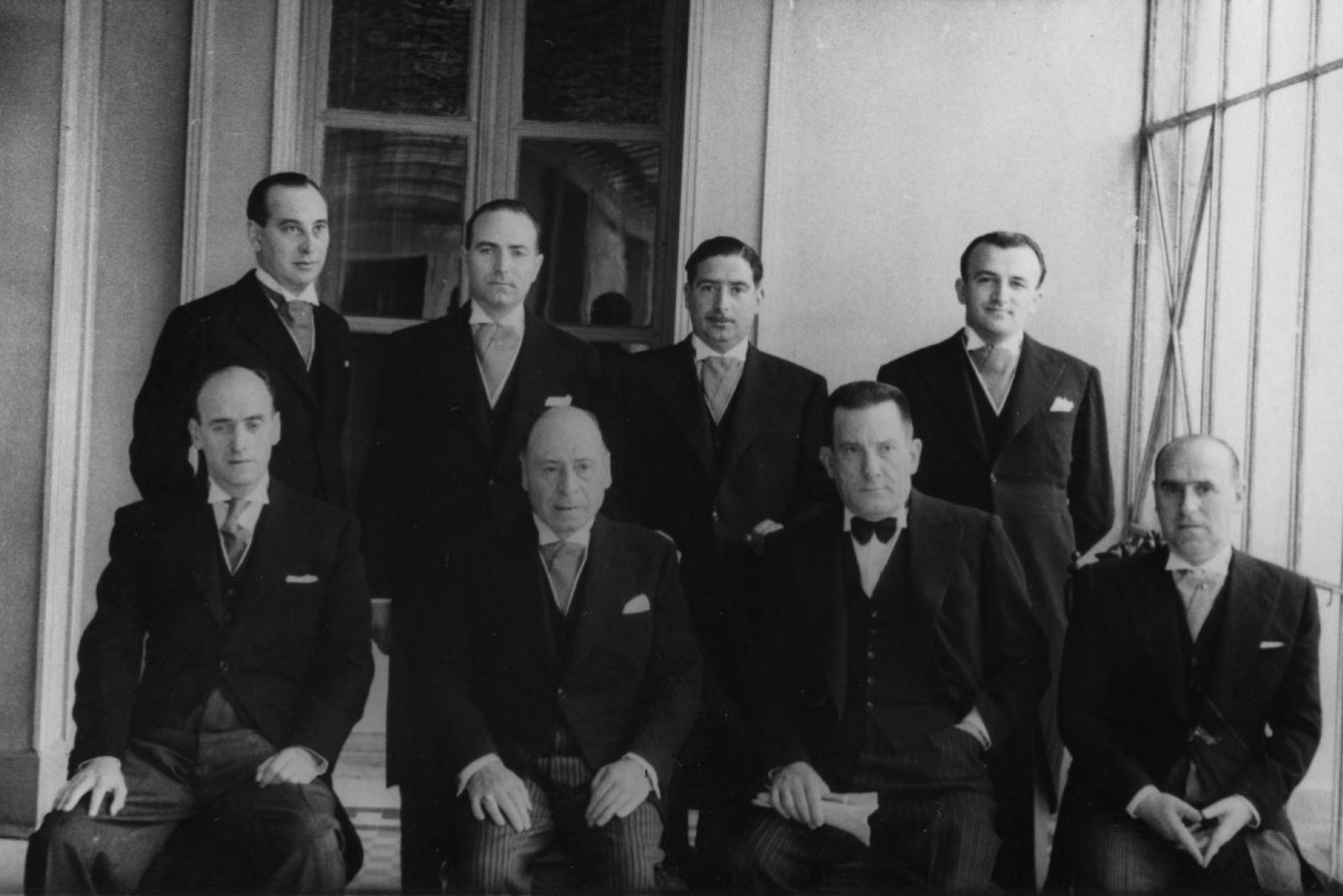
Larrainzar in diputación foral, 1949

After the war Larrainzar did not engage in Francoist structures and was viewed as enemy by supporters of the regime; in September 1939 a group of military men assaulted him in a bar and followed him on his way home; amidst insults and jolts, he lost his watch and his spectacles. Until the late 1940s he did not assume any position of power. In 1948 he ran in the first local elections of the regime and was voted into the Estella ayuntamiento; the same year he assumed the post of alcalde, 41 years after his father had vacated it. In 1949 and as the most voted candidate he was elected to the local Navarrese self-government, Diputación Foral, from the pool reserved for municipal councilors. As its member he formed part of opposition against the FET civil governors, first Juan Junquera Fernández Carvajal and then Luis Valero Bermejo. Within the fragmented body, Larrainzar and the fellow Carlist José Ángel Zubiaur Alegre constituted the nucleus of the fronde, as they remained "carlisti manifestamente contrari a Valero ed al partido unificado della FET y de las JONS, che promossero un'intensa attivitá di opposizione". The conflict might be interpreted in terms of confrontation between the Carlists and the Falangists, in terms of the Navarrese defending regional fueros against centralizing designs of Madrid, or in terms of a fairly typical struggle for power between two competing bodies. Initially it climaxed in confrontation over Junta Superior de Educación de Navarra, which ended in sort of a draw. In 1950 Larrainzar almost succeeded in getting Diputación to protest the closure of the Carlist círculo in Pamplona, but the initiative failed due to internal divisions among the Carlists as to the strategy to be adopted.

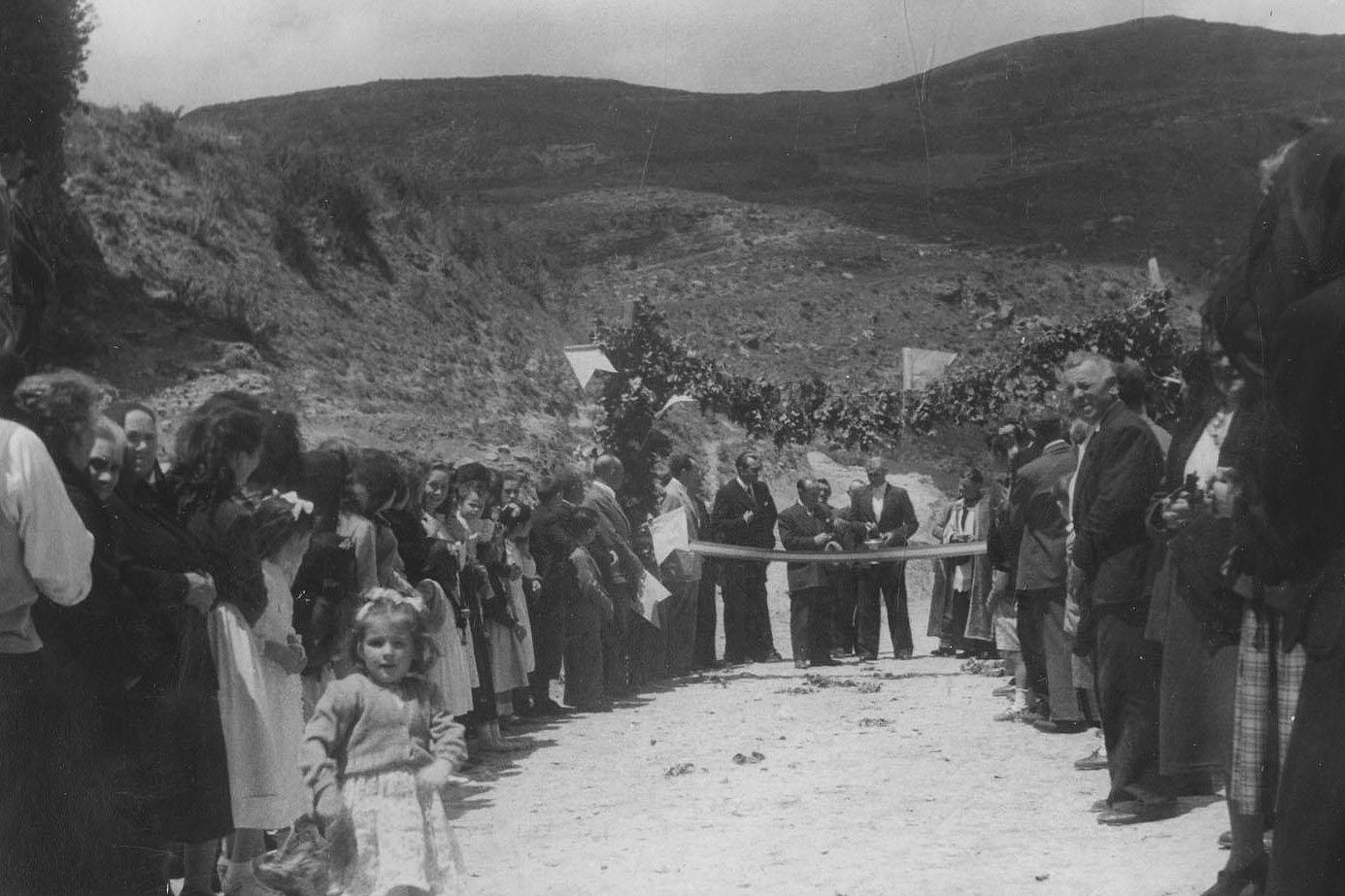
Larrainzar as diputado opening a road

Larrainzar co-engineered a network of local candidates across the towns and villages of Navarre, especially in his native Estella county; a historian notes that he was "de gran influencia en la merindad", where opposition to the Falangist governor and his line was most visible. Valero himself noted that "la oposición en todo este distrito ha partido fundamentalmente del Círculo Carlista de Estella y del diputado Sr. Larrainzar, contrarios a una colaboración honrada con las autoridades del régimen". At one point it might have appeared that Valero was clearly gaining the upper hand, as in 1952, in midst of his term, Larrainzar ceased as the mayor of Estella. The conflict went on, e.g. in 1953 the Diputación financed a series of booklets by professors of the Zaragoza University, which pointed to fueros as to fundament of the local legislative system. Both sides bombarded various central institutions with letters and made personal representations in Madrid. Eventually following the 1954 audience of the Diputación vice-president with Franco, Valero was immediately dismissed. A historian concludes that "il foralismo navarrista era uscito vittorioso dalla lotta contro il Movimiento".

== Carlist against Carlists ==
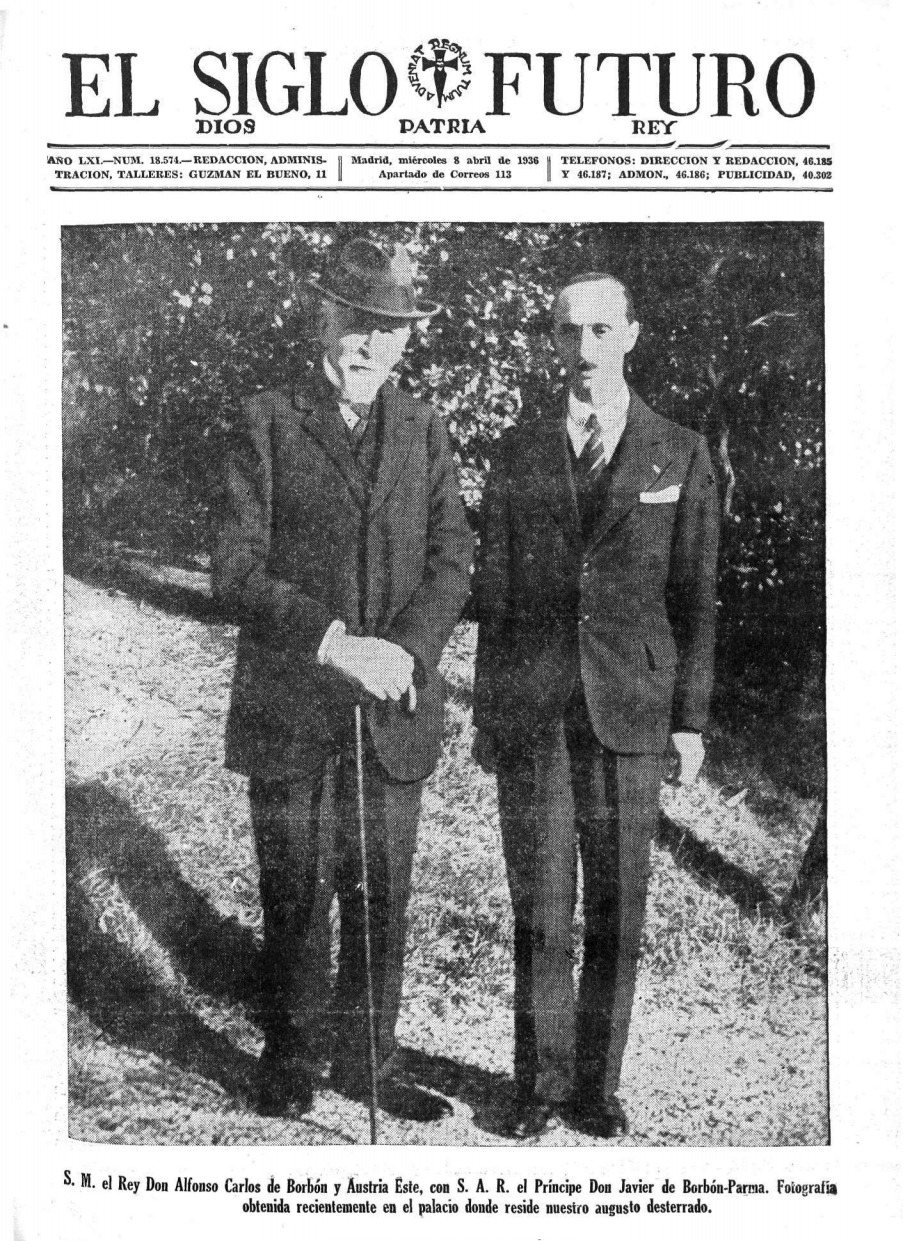
Don Javier (earlier pic)

One of key dividing lines within Carlism of the 1940s was the question of royal succession; since 1936 Don Javier acted as a temporary regent. Though Carlism structures, led by Manuel Fal Conde, supported the regency, more and more Traditionalist partisans felt that it was long overdue. Larrainzar was among them: in 1945 and as representative of the Estella Traditionalists he co-signed a letter, directed to Don Javier; the signatories in polite terms asked for termination of the regency and appointment of "el príncipe en quien concurre el derecho de sangre y las posibilidades de reinar". The request was related to another question: who should be the next Carlist king. The phrasing implicitly pointed to Don Juan, the Alfonsist claimant. Having received no response, in 1946 along numerous Navarrese Carlists and as "jefe local de Estella" Larrainzar co-signed another letter, phrased more boldly and including open criticism. It stated that "se han extralimitado las características institucionales de la Regencia" and referred to Don Javier as "foreign prince", acceptable as a regent, but not as a king. he late 1940s the issue was getting increasingly divisive. The question of regency and succession was partially overlapping the question of Carlist stand versus the regime; Larrainzar opposed those suspected of trading Carlist principles for Francoist favors and on these grounds he opposed the Navarrese candidature of Luis Arellano to the Cortes in 1949. During the local elections of 1951 together with Zubiaur and Amadeo Marco he formed part of the "radical" faction, opposing the collaborationists and the Carloctavistas. The same year he addressed Don Javier with another letter, asking that a new Navarrese executive be formed. The reasons were to "evitar que el carlismo pase a ser un nostálgico recuerdo individual" and to enhance the struggle for foral rights. He again underlined the need to do away with regency, as without a king, Carlism would be merely "una pura teoría política".

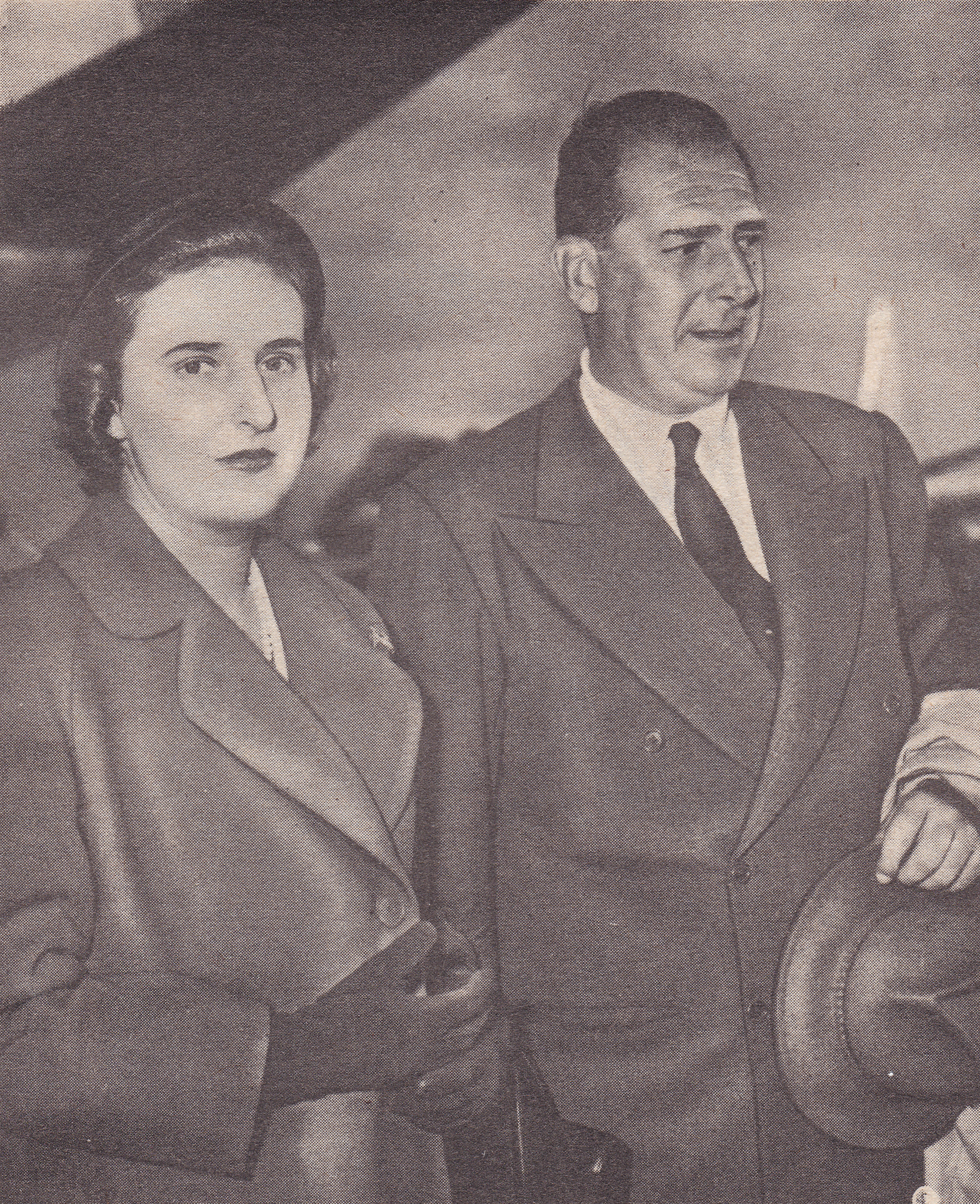
Don Juan, late 1950s

Don Javier responded with a letter: though in a conciliatory tone, it stressed the need to maintain discipline. Still in 1951 the regent sort of followed Larrainzar's proposal and appointed the new Navarrese Junta Regional; its members came from the Rodeznista sector (Martínez Berasáin), from the Falcondista group (Astrain Baquedano) and the radicals; this last faction included Larrainzar. However, neither Don Javier nor Fal Conde placed much trust in him; to them, "ninguno de estos dos [with Zubiaur] es de confianza", as they represented "funesto navarrismo", which has already caused lots of damage to the cause. Once in 1952 Larrainzar lost his job of the Estella mayor and his seat in Diputación Provincial, he was becoming less of an asset for Carlism. It is not clear when he vacated his seat in Junta Regional. His relations with the movement were becoming lax. He was last noted as involved in 1957, when among a large group of Carlists, later to be dubbed "estorilos", he recognized Don Juan as the legitimate Traditionalist successor.

== Last years ==
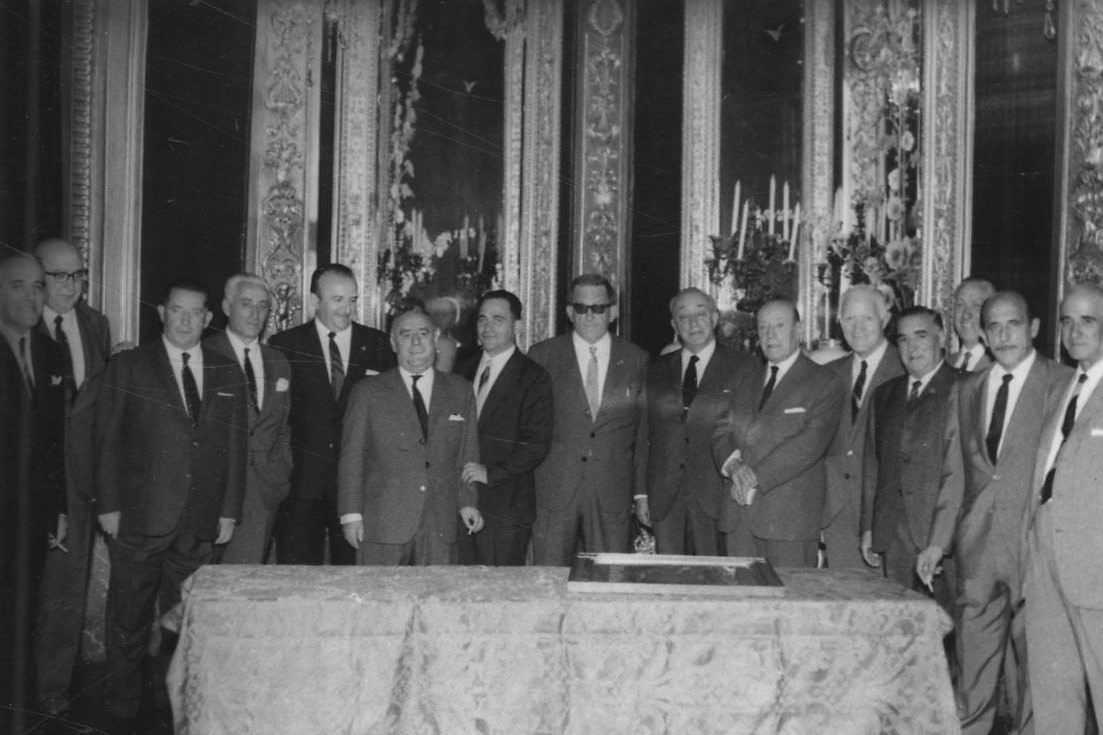
among Navarrese officials, 1967

Though in the mid-1950s the Carlist-foralist group emerged victorious from the struggle against Valero and his Falangist line, it was exactly at this time that Larrainzar was about to partially settle in Madrid. None of the sources consulted clarifies the motives behind his decision to loosen the ties with Navarre, especially given in Estella he was basking in prestige as former alcalde and remained the dean of the local Colegio de Abogados. In 1954 he was admitted to Colegio de Abogados de Madrid; the purpose declared was this of "ejercicio propio" as "abogado", a private law practice. He settled at Calle Goded (now Calle del General Arrando) in the highly prestigious Chamberí district; however, there is no information available on his further activity as a lawyer, be it a solicitor, barrister or at any other role.

In 1955 Larrainzar ceased as concejal of the Estella ayuntamiento, yet despite his partial Madrid residence, he cultivated the links with Navarre and its institutions. The same year he was elected to Consejo Foral Administrativo; he took the seat in the pool reserved for former diputados forales. This large 43-member gathering did not enjoy decision-making powers and served as an auxiliary consultative body, supposed to advise the Diputación; however, apart from remuneration it guaranteed its members prestige and insider knowledge. Larrainzar was re-elected to Consejo Foral in 1958. It is not known whether following expiration of his second term in 1961 he decided not to stand or he failed during the election process. It seems that at the time he shared his time between Estella and Madrid, as every some time he was noted on société columns of the Navarrese press.

Larrainzar's political activities ceased entirely. Though Carlism of the early 1960s was undergoing the period of profound internal strife, related to emergence of a new carlo-huguista group, he is not mentioned in any historiographic work related. Neither there is any evidence that he maintained any activity as supporter the Alfonsist claimant Don Juan, whom he endorsed back in 1957. The only vague link to Traditionalism outlook identified is the 1962 co-foundation of Los Amigos del Camino de Santiago de Estella, the organization where he served as its first executive. Though he held no official position, at times and as ex-deputy he appeared during ceremonies organized by local self-governmental authorities. In 1968 he was appointed to Tribunal Administrativo Delegado de la Diputación Foral de Navarra, a traditional body reinstated in 1964 and tasked with pronouncing on complaints, lodged by citizens against their local administration. Following this appointment he concluded the 14-year spell in Madrid and returned to Navarre. Two years later his death was noted only by local periodicals like Diario de Navarra.

== See also ==
- Carlism
- Traditionalism (Spain)
