= Silvia Ederra =

Spanish handball player (1983–2026)

Personal information
- Nickname: La Roca
- Nationality: Spanish
- Born: 8 September 1983 Estella-Lizarra, Spain
- Died: 8 September 2026 (aged 43) Pamplona, Spain

Silvia Ederra Urra (8 September 1983 – 8 September 2026) was a Spanish handball player who played internationally for the Spain women's national handball team. She amassed a record of 13 national titles over the course of her twenty year career before announcing her retirement in May 2025. She died on 8 September 2026, her forty-third birthday.

== Career ==
Ederra started playing handball at the age of 8, following in the footsteps of her sister, who already played handball. She was a senior international for Spain, competing in the Champions League and other European competitions, and won 13 club titles (5 league titles, 5 Super Cups, and 3 Copas de la Reina) as well as a bronze medal at the European junior level. She has spent over 28 years playing handball, more than 20 of them as a professional.

During her time in Castro Urdiales, she overcame a car collision and a herniated disc operation that significantly weakened her legs. In 2018, she suffered a muscle fiber tear at the myotendinous junction of the medial gastrocnemius and the Achilles tendon.

After recovering from her injury at Sporting La Rioja, she signed for Balonmano Bera Bera, with whom she had her greatest successes: League, Queen's Cup and Super Cup, in addition to playing in the Champions League.

After two years back in La Rioja, the pivot from Estella ended her successful athletic career in 2020. Silvia emphasized that the decision was "difficult and well-considered," but given the sporting circumstances imposed by the pandemic, "it was the right time." Nevertheless, following the promotion to the División de Honor in the 2022–23 season, Silvia returned to play for Sporting at age 39 and renewed her contract in 2024 for another season after securing promotion in 2023–24. After leaving his team in the top Spanish division, she retired in May 2025.

She played for the Spanish teams Itxako, Mar Alicante, Castro Urdiales, Bera Bera, and Sporting La Rioja.

With Bera Bera and Itxako, she participated in several editions of the European Cup Winners' Cup, the EHF Cup, and the Champions League.

== Personal life and death ==
Ederra attended the Nuestra Señora del Puy school in Lizarra, later earning a degree in Business Administration and Management from the Public University of Navarre and an online master's degree in Marketing and Distribution Channels from the Autonomous University of Barcelona.

Ederra died on 8 September 2026, her 43rd birthday. Various handball clubs and institutions from La Rioja and Navarre – including Club Balonmano Ciudad de Logroño and her final active team, Grafometal Sporting La Rioja – officially confirmed her death, prompting widespread expressions of grief and shock throughout the Spanish sports community.

== Sports career ==
- –2007: Itxako
- 2007–09: Mar Alicante
- 2009–11: Castro Urdiales
- 2011–12: Sporting La Rioja
- 2012–18: Bera Bera
- 2018–20: Sporting La Rioja
- 2020–23: Retirement
- 2023–25: Sporting La Rioja

== Titles and awards ==
=== Club titles ===
- 5 x Liga española (2012/13, 2013/14, 2014/15, 2015/16, 2017/18)
- 3 x Copa de la Reina (2013, 2014, 2016)
- 5 x Supercopa de España (2013, 2014, 2015, 2016, 2017)

=== With the Spanish national team ===
- Bronze medal at the European Junior Championships in Finland

=== Individual awards ===
- Estrella del Deporte (transl. Star of Sport) (2016) after winning League, Cup and Super Cup with Bera Bera Handball.
- Most sporting player (2003–04)
