= Palace of the Kings of Navarre, Estella =

Coordinates: 42.6694°N 2.0297°W

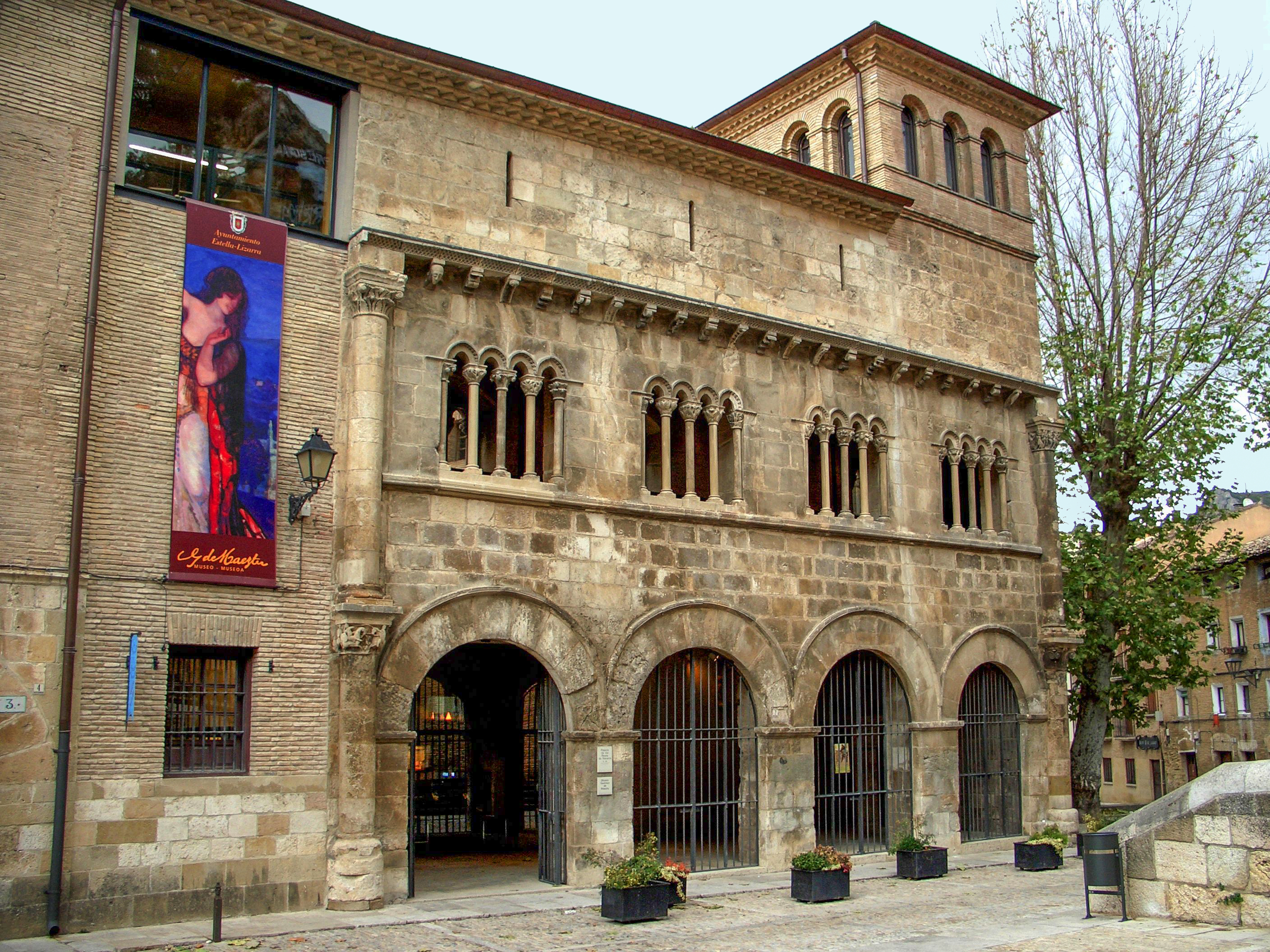
View of the Palace.

The Palacio de los Reyes de Navarra (Basque: Nafarroako Erregeen jauregia), also called the Palacio de los Duques de Granada de Ega, is a historical building in Estella, Navarre, Spain; it is the Romanesque former royal palace of the Kings and Queens of Navarre from the late 12th century to the mid-15th. In the twentieth century the building, which had fallen into disrepair, was restored and in 1991 converted into the Museo Gustavo de Maeztu (Basque: Gustavo de Maeztu Museoa), housing the work of the painter Gustavo de Maeztu y Whitney and open to the public. The building is important in the history of architecture in Navarre, since it is the only civil building extant from the Romanesque period. In 1931, it was declared a national monument by the Spanish government.

== Description ==
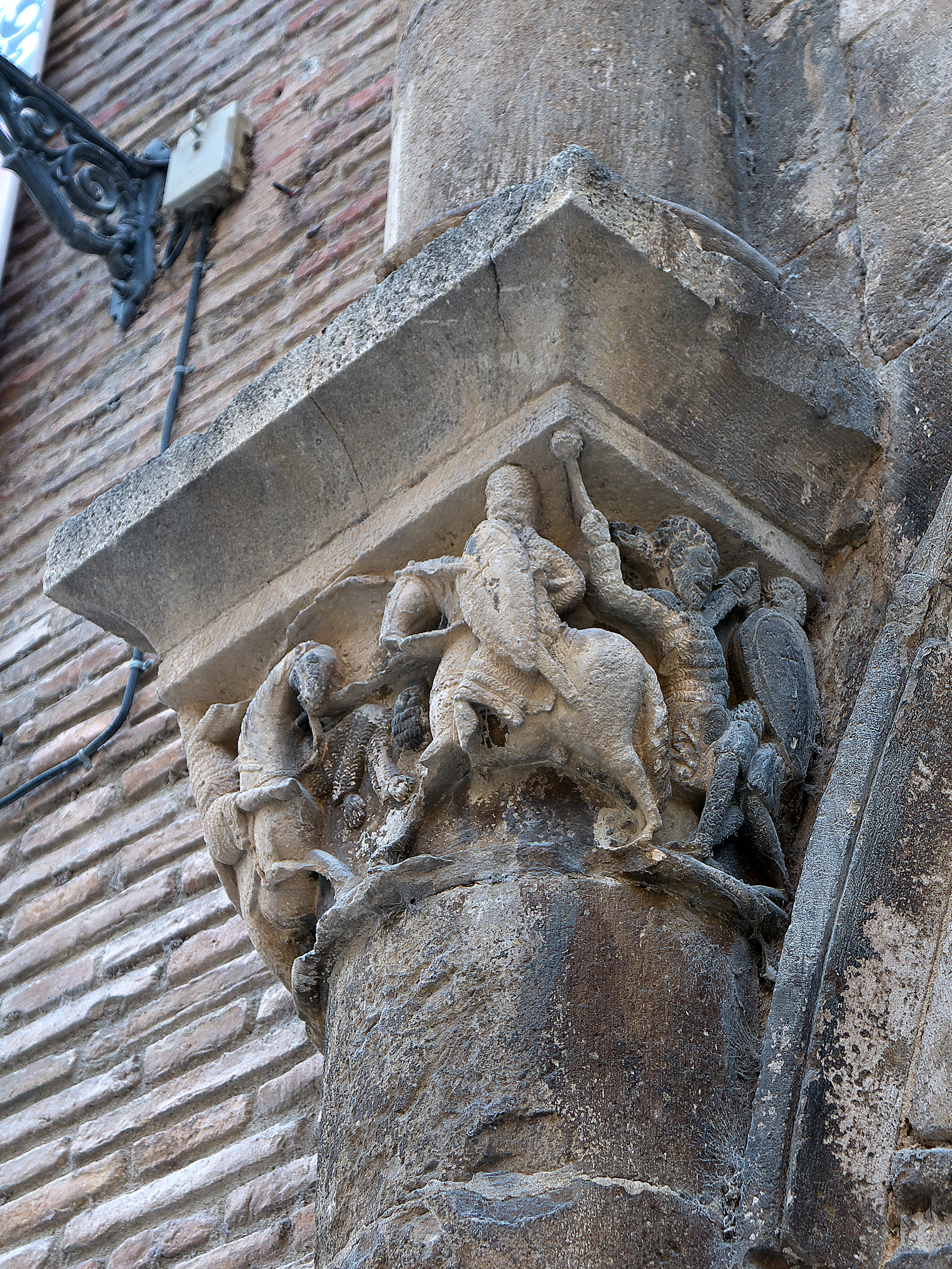
Moralizing capital showing Roland against the giant Ferragut by master Martin of Logroño

It is a Romanesque building built in the second half of 12th century, located in the Plaza de San Martín and on the corner of Calle de San Nicolás, an ancient entrance for pilgrims.

The most significant element is the main facade, located opposite the stairway of San Pedro de la Rúa. It consists of two floors built in ashlar masonry, which are divided in height by a simple molded cornice. The lower body is a gallery of four arches framed by columns attached to the wall, decorated with capitals of vegetable and figurative type.

On the left side there are figures of stylized forms that narrate an episode of the Legend of Roland, specifically the scene of Roldan's fight against the giant Ferragut, trying to exemplify the struggle of good against evil. It is signed by Martinus of Logroño. On the right side, the decoration is formed by thin leaves of penca, Cistercian rooted.

The second floor has four large windows, each divided into its internal space by four slightly pointed arches that rest on fine encapsulated columns adorned with plant, animal and figurative decoration. Above them, a cornice with sculpted corbels. Here the original forms alternate with recent reconstructions, given that over time the structure was modified to adapt to the needs and diverse functions that it has had as a palace and as a prison for the judicial district.

It is closed on its sides by two semi-columns, with a decorative scheme on its different capitals. On the left is a capital with plant decoration, while on the right side you can see a set where scenes have been conceived related to the sin of pride, the punishment of hell and lust.

The third floor, work of the 18th century, is built in brick.

Since June 14, 1991, it has housed the painter's museum Gustavo de Maeztu. The rooms of the museum are distributed in the last two floors of the building and house paintings, drawings, lithographs and other pieces by this painter, one of the most important of the so-called "Basque School".

== External images ==
- Photograph before restoration, accompanied by extensive text in Spanish
- Photographs at La Guía Digital del Arte Románico
- Photograph at Flickr
