= San Martín de Unx =

Municipality of Spain

Coordinates: 42°31′N 1°33′W

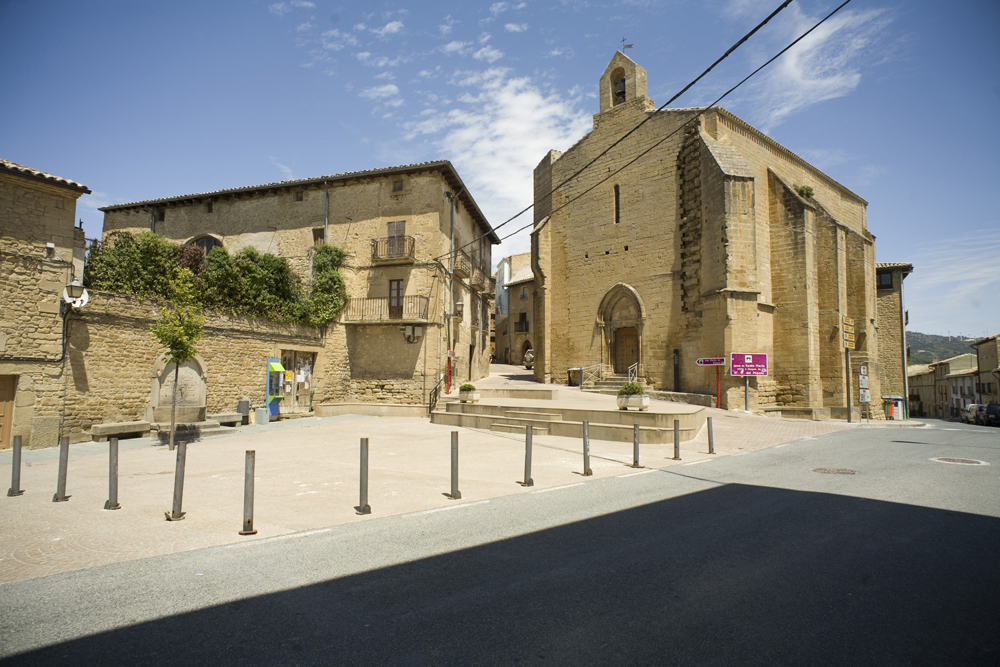
Church of San Martín de Tours, San Martín de Unx, Navarra

San Martín de Unx (Basque: San Martin Unx or Donamartiri-Untz) is a town and municipality in the province and autonomous community of Navarre, northern Spain.
