= Estella-Lizarra =

- Municipality
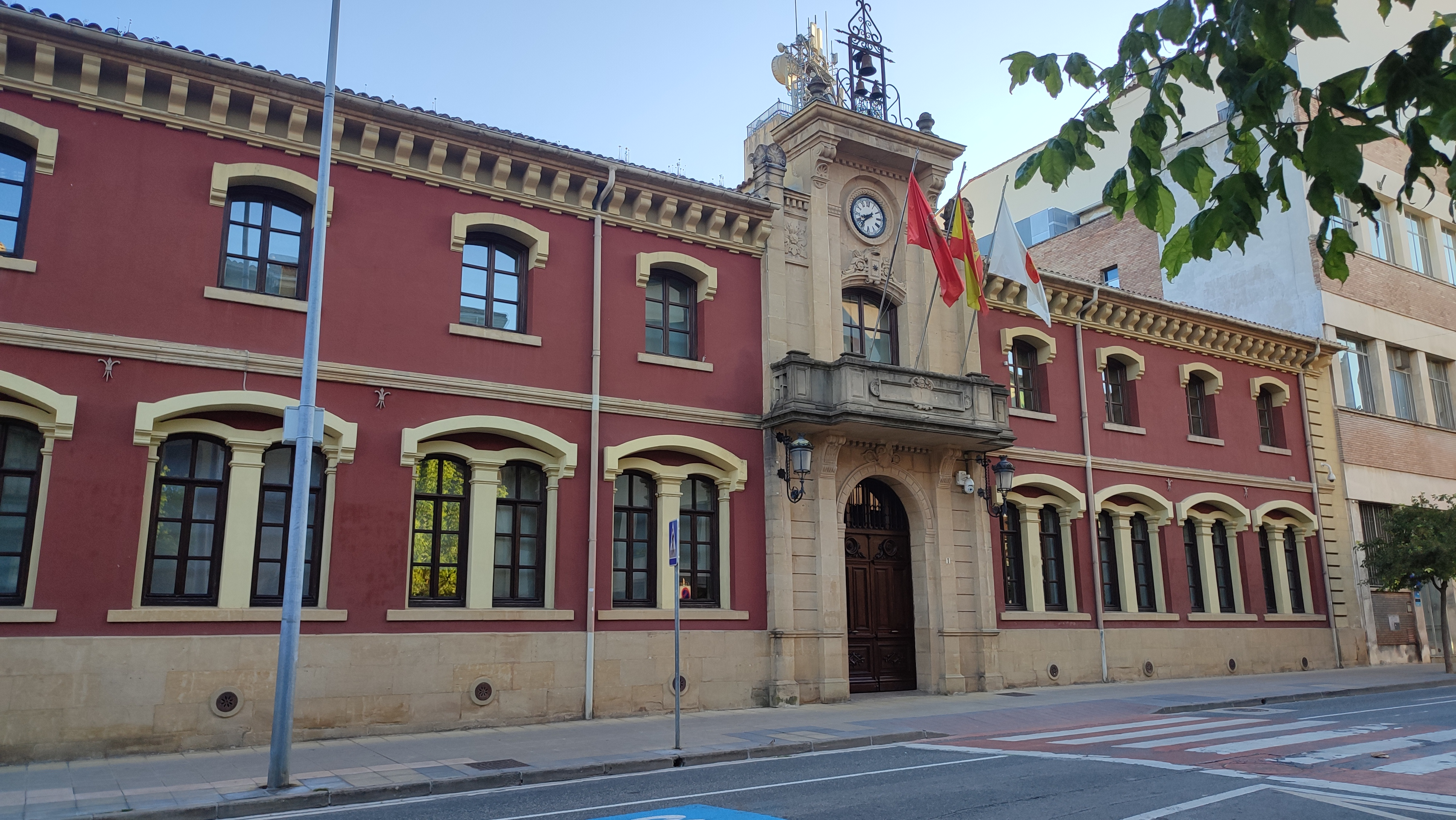
- Town hall

- Flag Coat of arms

- Location in Basque Country
- Coordinates: 42°40′19″N 2°01′55″W
- Country: Spain
- Autonomous Community: Navarre
- Province: Navarre
- Comarca / Eskualdea: Estella Oriental

Government
  - Mayor: Koldo Leoz (EH Bildu)

Area
  - Total: 15 km^{2} (5.8 sq mi)
- Elevation (AMSL): 421 m (1,381 ft)

Population (2025-01-01)
  - Total: 14,317
  - Density: 950/km^{2} (2,500/sq mi)
- Time zone: UTC+1 (CET)
  - Summer (DST): UTC+2 (CEST (GMT +2))
- Postal code: 31200
- Area code: +34 (Spain) + 948 (Navarre)
- Website: Town Council

Estella (Spanish) or Lizarra (Basque) is a town located in the autonomous community of Navarre, in northern Spain. It lies south west of Pamplona, close to the border with La Rioja and Álava.

The town, located near a great meander of the Ega, was founded in 1090 when the place, lying by the fortified settlement of Lizarra, was granted a charter by the Pamplonese king Sancho Ramirez. The town became a landmark in the Way of St. James pilgrimage route to Santiago de Compostela, thriving on the privileged location and the melting pot of Francos called in by Navarrese kings (mainly Occitans from Auvergne and Limousin), Jews and the original Navarrese inhabitants. The wealth resulted in a development of Romanesque architecture, well represented in the town: Church of San Pedro de la Rúa, Palacio de los Reyes de Navarra, Church of San Miguel, among others.

== History ==
Historically, there was a Jewish community in Estella, and its earliest written record dates to the 11th century. Many Jews from Andalusia immigrated to Estella due to the privileges granted to Jews there. Most notably was Moses ibn Ezra, a Jewish poet from Granada. The Jews were expelled from Estella in 1498.

The town was long the headquarters of Don Carlos, who was proclaimed king here in 1833. It was a major headquarters of the Carlist party in the Carlist Wars of the mid 19th century, with Tomás de Zumalacárregui being appointed Commander in Chief in this Estella-Lizarra. In 1872, with the beginning of the Third Carlist War, Estella became the court of Carlos de Borbón y Austria-Este, called Carlos VII of Spain by his supporters, and virtually the capital of Carlist Spain until the capture of Estella by liberal troops on 16 February 1876, when the Carlists in the town surrendered.

Between 1927 and 1967, the town held the terminus of the Ferrocarril Vasco-Navarro railway extending up to Bergara. The line was fitted with electrified power supply as of 1938, a provision considered a feat at the time.

In 1927, Club Deportivo Izarra was formed, who currently play in the Segunda División B.

The town regularly hosts the GP Miguel Induráin.

== Notable residents ==
- Aaron ben Zerah (unknown–1328) – Jewish martyr of the 14th century
- Daniel Irujo Urra (1862–1911) - Carlist Basque politician and official
- Jesús Larrainzar Yoldi (1907–1970) - Carlist politician, former mayor of Estella-Lizarra
- Silvia Ederra (1983–2026) – professional handball player
- Javi Martínez (b. 1988) – professional footballer for Bayern Munich and Spain, with whom he won the World Cup.
