= Municipal electoral regime during Francoism =

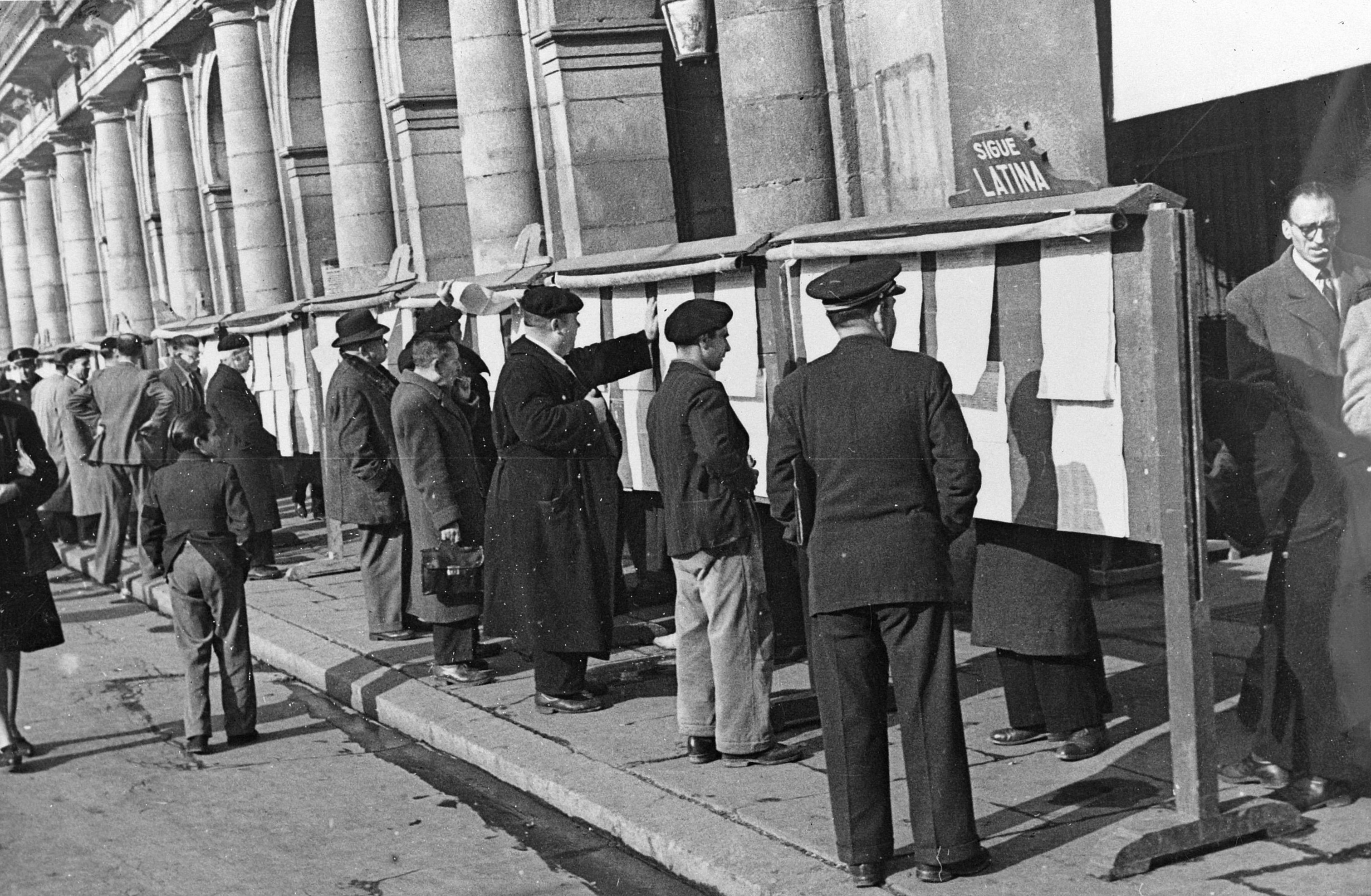
Municipal elections in Madrid, 1948

In Francoist Spain mandates in municipal councils were divided into three pools: in Tercio Familiar only so-called heads of family were entitled to vote, in Tercio Sindical the councillors were chosen in a phased system based on trade unions, and in Tercio de Entidades seats were filled also in a two-step way related to other organizations. Local elections were organized every three years, in each cycle voting for half of the mandates available in every ayuntamiento; from 1948 to 1973 the balloting took place nine times. The system was designed to ensure bureaucratic control of the electoral process and as such it proved largely successful. Electoral campaign was non-confrontational and presented as administrative, not political exercise. Until the 1970s around 45% of adults were entitled to vote, later the figure grew significantly. The turnout is estimated to range from 80% during early Francoism to below 50% in its final stages.

== Legal basis ==
The first general document regulating the regime of local elections was Ley de Bases de Régimen Local of 1945, in large part based on Estatuto Municipal prepared in 1924 by José Calvo Sotelo; it was detailed in a decree in 1950. Another decree of 1952 specified organization and modus operandi of local councils. In 1953 the 1945 Ley de Bases was replaced by a new one, in turn detailed in a decree of 1955. This set of documents remained in force until 1970, when it was appended by a new regulation. A third version of Ley de Bases de Régimen Local was adopted on November 19, 1975, few days before the death of Franco.

== Frequency ==
Until 1948 municipalities were governed by Comisiones Gestoras, municipal bodies entirely appointed by the government and provincial civil governors. Since 1948 municipal elections were organized nine times, in 1948, 1951, 1954, 1957, 1960, 1963, 1966, 1970 and 1973. The unusually long 4-year term of 1966-1970 resulted from protracted works on new election regime, completed in 1970. Every time the elections were organized in late November and in a 2-week sequence: on the first Sunday of the cycle the vote fell on Tercio Familiar, on the second Sunday on Tercio Sindical and on the third Sunday on Tercio de Entidades; starting in 1970 elections were organized on a Tuesday, reportedly to increase the turnout.

== General principles ==
Francoism adopted an organicist principle; it envisioned society not as a sum of individuals, but as a construction built of a number of traditional social entities. Accordingly, representation should be performed not on the basis of universal suffrage, but rather be exercised by means of so-called intermediary bodies. In case of municipalities this principle was embodied in the scheme encompassing three equal pools of mandates, each pool to represent a specific organic body of the society: families, syndicates and other organisations. Electoral curias choosing their representatives were named accordingly as Tercio Familiar, Tercio Sindical and Tercio de Entidades (also named Tercio Corporativo).

== Municipal electoral regime ==
The term of a councillor was six years, yet the elections were organised every three years and covered only half of the mandates in every council. This stipulation was inherited from the Restoration era, but was welcome as it prevented drastic changes and ensured a sense of continuity. Each voter was permitted to choose as many candidates as many mandates were available. A voter had to cast his/her ballot in person and only in his/her constituency; voting by post was not allowed. The mayor (alcalde) was appointed by the minister of interior in case of provincial capitals and by civil governor in case of other municipalities. The alcalde did not have to be a councillor; the only requirements were that he is Spanish and above 25 years of age. This model changed in the legislation adopted few days before the death of Franco, which stipulated that the menthod of mayoral selection was changed to be one elected by the councillors of the municipality or city.

== Number of mandates available ==
In line with general division into three equal tercios, number of mandates available for every council was the multiplication of three. The number of mandates available for council depended upon the number of inhabitants in the municipality and ranged from three (municipality below 501 inhabitants) to six (501 to 2,000 inhabitants), nine (2,001 to 10,000 inhabitants), 12 (10,001 to 20,000 inhabitants), 15 (20,001 to 50,000 inhabitants), 18 (50,001 to 100,000 inhabitants), 21 (100,001 to 500,000 inhabitants) and 24 (above 500,000 inhabitants). Compared to older Republican and Restoration regulations the scheme reduced significantly the number of mandates; e.g. during the Second Republic the city of Palencia, then ca. 25,000 inhabitants, was entitled to a 24-member council, while in the 1940s and 1950s, when its population ranged from 35,000 to 48,000 inhabitants, it was entitled to a 15-member council.

== Electoral rights ==
curia	active suffrage	passive suffrage
Tercio Familiar	residents; AND: above 21 years of age OR younger but legally emancipated; AND: married males (since 1970 also married females) OR widows/widowers OR non-married women/men living on their own	residents (males and females); AND: above 23 years of age; AND: have been a councillor in the very council for at least a year OR are proposed by at least two Cortes deputies/ex-deputies from Tercio Corporativo of the province in question OR are proposed by at least three provincial diputación deputies/ex-deputies OR are proposed by at least four active councillors of the very council OR are proposed by at least 1/20 of all heads of family eligible to vote in the municipality
Tercio Sindical	residents (males and females); AND: above 23 years of age; AND: members of Organización Sindical; AND: elected as delegates (compromisarios) by all members of Social and Economic sections of syndicates registered in the municipality. Total number of delegates is to be tenfold the number of councillors to be elected. The number of delegates elected by workers and the number of delegates elected by employees should be equal	residents (males and females); AND: above 23 years of age; AND: members of Organización Sindical; AND: have held or hold any elected post within a sindical organization OR are proposed by at least two Cortes deputies/ex-deputies from Tercio Sindical of the province OR are proposed by at least 1/20 of all members of sindical organizations in the municipality OR in case the number of candidates from this tercio is less than double the number of mandates, individuals proposed by Junta Local de Elecciones Sindicales
Tercio de Entidades	councillors elected from Tercio Familiar and Tercio Sindical	residents (males and females); AND: above 23 years of age; AND: members of any economic, cultural or professional organization registered in the municipality OR in case the number of candidates from this tercio is lower than three times the number of mandates available, individuals of prestige proposed by civil governor

== Electorate ==
The population entitled to vote in Tercio Familiar ranged from 7m in the 1940s to 18m in the 1970s, the increase resulting not only from demographic growth but also from extending the voting rights to married females. Until 1970, the electorate of Tercio Familiar represented some 45% of the entire adult population, estimated on basis of the number of Spaniards entitled to vote in the Francoist referendums; since 1970 the number grew to some 75%. Until the 1970s some 65% of adult males were entitled to vote, in case of females this number was 20%; since 1970 the percentage probably equalled this appropriate for males. In Tercio Sindical the number of those eligible to elect compromisarios is difficult to estimate, yet given the size of syndicalist bureaucracy it probably went into hundreds of thousands. The number of compromisarios, i.e. those who were actually electing the councillors, is estimated for the whole Spain as hovering around 50,000; in 1948 in Madrid their number was 2,187. In Tercio de Entidades the number of voters equalled the number of mandates available in two other tercios and remained in the range of few thousand. Some individuals, mostly married working males, were entitled to participate in election process in all three tercios: in Tercio Familiar personally, in Tercio Sindical by electing compromisarios, and in Tercio de Entidades by electing councillors in two other tercios who acted as compromisarios.

== Turnout ==
Technically taking part in elections was obligatory, though sanctions for absenteeism were low and their application rather exceptional. This schizophrenic position of the authorities is summarised by a present day-scholar, who notes that the entire system was constructed to discourage mobilisation, but prior to the very day propaganda did everything to ensure largest possible turnout. Actual turnout is subject to estimates, as official data is widely believed to be manipulated. Scholarly works suggest a decreasing trend, with 80% in the early 1950s, 55–65% in the 1960s and below 50% in the 1970s. Apart from fundamental political issues - like refusal to participate in the Francoist political system - other factors quoted as responsible for decreasing turnout were complex electoral system, perceived limited role of elected ayuntamientos and suspicions of electoral fraud.

== Manipulation and fraud ==
The election system contained many in-built features which enabled manipulation. The key one was the right of civil governors to appoint candidates in Tercio de Entidades in case their overall number was lower than three times the number of mandates available; given the councillors from this tercio were elected by councillors already elected from two other tercios, candidates proposed by authorities were virtually ensured mandate and the pool was at times dubbed "tercio de consolación". The similar mechanism was employed in case of Tercio Sindical, though this time it was Junta Local entitled to suggest own candidates. Notorious Article 29 was inherited from the Restoration system; in case the number of candidates in Tercio Familiar was lower than or equal to the number of mandates, the candidates were declared victorious with no balloting taking place. Most of the electoral process was technically handled by Falange/Movimiento.

== Loopholes ==
Occasionally, candidates openly hostile to the Francoist State managed to gain seats in local councils; it was the case especially during late Francoism. Usually these were either single individuals or a tiny minority in the ayuntamiento; as such they posed little threat and the state did not intervene, e.g. in 1970 two candidates marked by the police as "oposición" were elected and confirmed in Seville. At times and in minor locations even candidates known as Communists got their tickets validated, like a party militant elected from tercio familiar in Lorca in 1971. However, at times the administration intervened; in 1973 a tercio familiar left-wing candidate from Barcelona found his electoral victory annulled by Junta Municipal del Censo. Only in few cases opposition bid caused serious problems for the state. This was the case of Pamplona, where since the late 1940s the Carlists posed a constant threat to the official monopoly. Following 1973 elections all seats from tercio familiar pool were seized by the opposition, with seats from the other tercios also contested; the civil governor intervened and judicial decision was pending for several of the council members.

== Electoral campaigns ==
In the Francoist system choosing local governing bodies was not presented as politics, either big or small; instead, it was staged as part of the administrative process. Accordingly, candidatures were usually formatted as non-confrontational and the electorate was simply supposed to choose between these more and less competent. Official lists of candidates was made public only seven days prior to the election day, which rendered mounting and staging an individual electoral campaign extremely difficult. Once the candidates were known local press used to present them, usually adhering to a non-partisan tone and refraining from promoting some contenders over the others.

== Role and impact within the system ==
A present-day scholar summarises the Francoist municipal electoral system as "leafy legislative tangle", a conglomerate of shady rules developed at various stages and serving various ends. As a whole it was designed as means of ensuring some efficiency of governance at the local level combined with contributing to political stability of Francoist Spain in the general perspective. The former was to be achieved by non-confrontational format, detachment from politics and efficient interface with local entities. The latter was to be achieved by overall bureaucratic control with a number of means available to manipulate the election result. Throughout all of the Francoist period local elections worked mostly as they were designed to. However, if the objective was also to forge some sort of identification with the state and ensure sustainable level of mobilisation, they probably failed.

== See also ==
- Francoism
- Corporatism
- Falangism
