= 1978 Spanish trade union representative elections =

Elections of trade union representatives were held across Spain in the first months of 1978. These were the first democratic union elections in 40 years. According to the state news agency EFE, elections were held in 29,918 companies for a total of 124,579 representative posts during the first three months of 1978 (these figures did however exclude the two largest companies in the country, the railways Renfe and Telefonica). The newly elected company committees (comités de empresa) replaced the former jurados de empresa of the Franco era as the recognized employees' representatives.

== Contenders ==
Two national trade union centres, CC.OO. (linked to the Communist Party of Spain) and UGT (linked to the Spanish Socialist Workers Party), dominated the polls.

UGT had the largest campaign budget. They had sought a 300 million peseta loan from Germany, but this credit had been denied. In the end (according to their own estimation) UGT had a campaign budget on the national level of 100 million peseta. The organization opened a large campaign office in Madrid and produced key-chains, posters, stickers and an audio cassette. In their campaign UGT actively sought to highlight their socialist profile.

A third force was Unión Sindical Obrera. It received some support from the Popular Socialist Party and the Carlist Party. The campaign slogan of USO was "Trabajador, la USO sólo pacta contigo" ('Worker, USO only makes pact with you'). The slogan was a reference to the Moncloa Pact.

Prior to the election, the two groups that constituted the 'Minority Tendency' in CC.OO. had broken away and formed their own union centres, CSUT linked to the Party of Labour of Spain and Sindicato Unitario linked to the Workers Revolutionary Organization. The campaign slogan of CSUT was "La CSUT, el sindicato que habla claro, da soluciones a los problemas y jamás se vende" ('CSUT, the trade union that speaks out, gives solution to the problems and never sells out'). SU had the slogan "Un frente común por el pan, el trabajo y la libertad" ('A common front for bread, work and freedom').

USO claimed that they had a budget of 30 million peseta and CC.OO. 15 million. CSUT claimed to have a campaign budget of two million peseta.

The historical anarcho-syndicalist CNT called for a boycott of the polls. Their slogan was "si nadie trabaja por tí, nadie debe decidir por tí" ('if no-one works for you, no-one should decide in your name').

== Outcome ==
Two national trade union centres, CC.OO. (linked to the Communist Party of Spain) and UGT (linked to the Spanish Socialist Workers Party), dominated the polls. UGT emerged as the leading force in 23 provinces (and in Ceuta and Melilla) whilst CC.OO. came to dominate 21 provinces. The election clarified the dominance of CC.OO. and UGT on the national level over the 'alphabet soup' of smaller unions. USO became somewhat marginalized as a result of the polls.

However, the fact that a sizeable share of the seats were won by independents can be seen as a sign that still there were many companies (with a combined workforce of around two million) where the organized unions had yet to reach after the fall of the dictatorship. In subsequent elections, the share of independent representatives decreased sharply.

== Electoral system ==
Ahead of the polls CC.OO. and UGT had agreed on the principles of voluntary and secret vote. However, UGT called for the usage of closed lists whilst CC.OO. wanted to have open lists. Although the underlying motives of the choice of different approaches to the electoral system are not entirely clear, one assumption is that CC.OO. favoured open lists as they would be benefitted by their superior number of organized cadres whilst UGT would have hoped that their connection to the Socialist Party could be better utilized with closed lists. In the end the Ministry of Labour adopted a mixed system. The polls in companies with less than 250 employees were held with open lists, in other companies closed lists were used.

== Results as of March 28, 1978 ==
Organization	No. of representatives	%
Comisiones Obreras	47,111	37.8%
Unión General de Trabajadores	38,671	31%
Unión Sindical Obrera	7,381	5.9%
Confederación de Sindicatos Unitarios de Trabajadores	4,984	4%
Sindicato Unitario	3,376	2,7%
ELA-STV	3,140	2,5%
Langile Abertzaleen Batzordeak	771	
Confederación Nacional del Trabajo	339	
STV (a)	309	
Sindicato Obrero Canario	240	
Sindicato Obreiro Galego	81	
Intersindical Nacional Galega	28	
Solidaritat d'Obrers de Catalunya	15	
Others	2,289	
Independent candidates	15,844	12.7%

These polls were held just before the creation of the present Autonomous Communities. The results are here listed by these regions, but in fact they did not exist as political entities at the time.

== Andalusia ==
In Málaga province elections were held in 46 companies. CC.OO. won 128 seats, UGT 96, independents 22, CSUT 16 and USO only one delegate.

== Asturias ==
The polls in La Camocha mine were won by CC.OO.. La Camocha had been the birthplace of CC.OO.. CC.OO. got 637 votes (14 seats) against 376 for UGT (8 seats). The Socialist Party general secretary Felipe González visited La Camocha during the election campaign.

== Basque Country ==
In the Basque Country, the nationalist union ELA-STV emerged as the largest force with 23.3% of the delegate seats. UGT won 16.9% of the seats in the region and CC.OO. 16.3%.

In Navarre the majority that had been active in CC.OO. had left to found SU. SU was a major force in the province in the elections. According to the official count, 2,614 delegates had been elected in 887 companies. The independents had been the largest group with 473 delegates. Amongst the trade union centres, SU had won 269 delegates whilst CC.OO. had got 268. However, a count made by Diario de Navarra presented different numbers. According to this count, elections were held for 2,837 delegates in 867 companies. CC.OO. got 488 seats (17.21%), SU 432 (15.23%), UGT 14.46% (410), CSUT 305 (10.75%), USO 173 (6.1%), ELA-STV 120 (4.23%), LAB 95 (3.32%), CGCM 27 (0.95%), STE 13 (0.56%), other trade unions (generally unions found in only one or two companies) 16 (0.66%) and various independents 752 (26.50%).

== Castilla y León ==
In Castilla y León the elections were won by UGT, that became the largest force in six out of nine provinces. UGT got 3,041 delegates (31.65%), CC.OO. 2,559 (26.63%), CSUT 3.83%, USO 3.6%, SU 0.98% and 33.28% for various independents.

== Catalonia ==
The elections in Catalonia were won by CC.OO., which had a strong backing in areas dominated by heavy industry. UGT, on the other hand, won support in small and medium-sized companies.

In the company committee at SEAT in Barcelona, CC.OO. obtained 21 seats, UGT 19, CSUT 5 and CGCM 3.

== Madrid ==
SU won the election at the conservative newspaper ABC in Madrid. At the Barajas printing centre, SU won 7 out of the 13 committee seats. At the calle Serrano editorial and administrative office, SU won 7 out of 22 seats.

== Railways ==
In RENFE elections were held on April 14, 1978. The railway workers polls were won by CC.OO., which gathered a majority of seats. It got around 49% of the votes, followed by 34% for UGT. In total there were 2,069 seats up for grab. CC.OO. got 976 delegates, UGT 680, USO 79, SICRE 56, CGT 10, SUF 70, CSUT 2, CDT 5, ELA-STV 1, INCA 2 and independents 188.
