= Las Palmas (Congress of Deputies constituency) =

Electoral constituency in Spain

Coordinates: 28°20′N 14°20′W

- Congress of Deputies; Electoral constituency
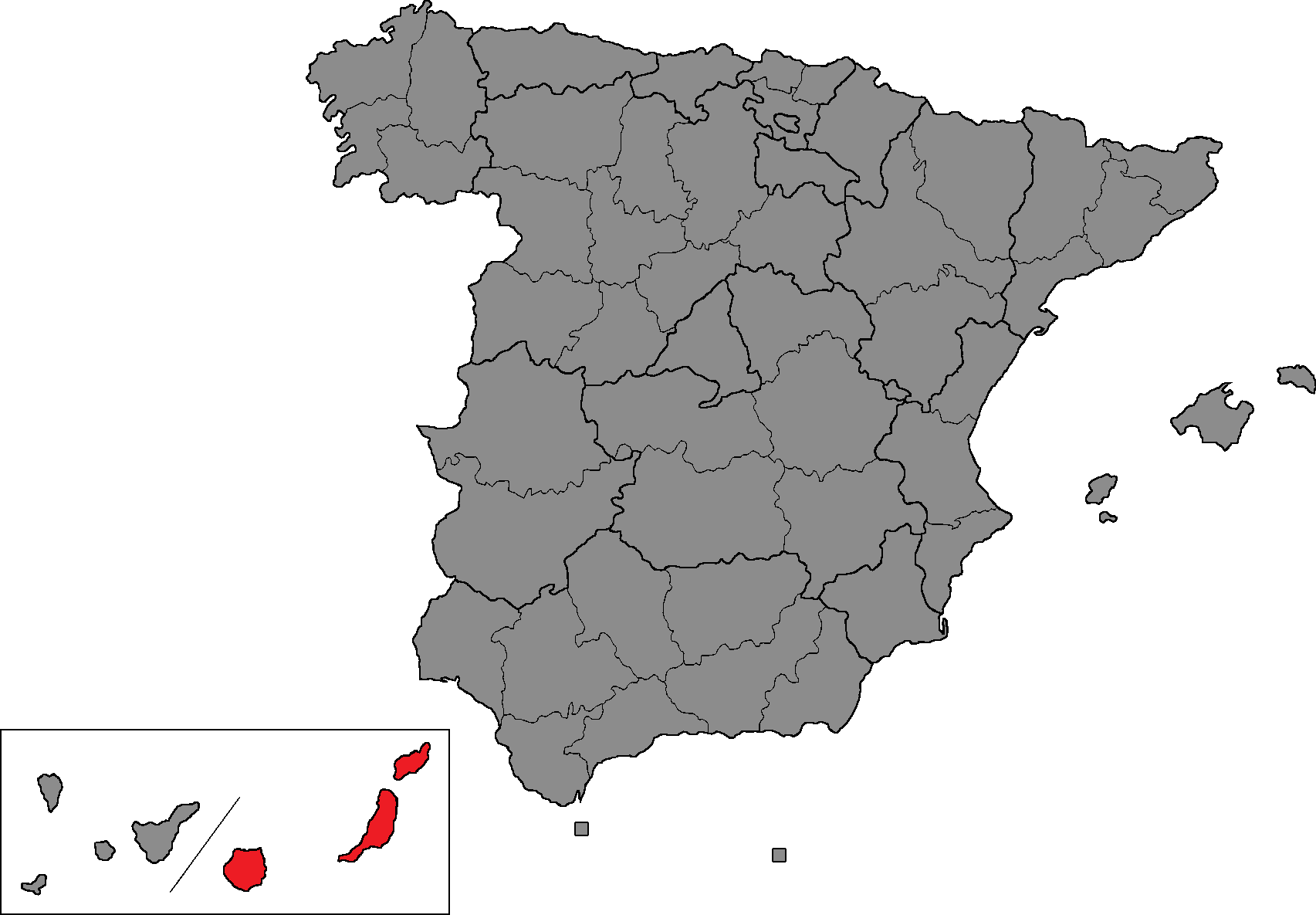
- Location of Las Palmas within Spain
- Province: Las Palmas
- Autonomous community: Canary Islands
- Population: ▲1,154,453 (2024)
- Electorate: ▲898,882 (2023)
- Major settlements: Las Palmas, Telde, Santa Lucía de Tirajana, Arrecife, San Bartolomé de Tirajana

Current constituency
- Created: 1977
- Seats: 6 (1977–1986); 7 (1986–2004); 8 (2004–present)
- Members: PSOE (3); PP (3); Vox (1); Podemos (1)

Las Palmas is one of the 52 constituencies represented in the Congress of Deputies, the lower chamber of the Spanish parliament, the Cortes Generales. The constituency (whose boundaries correspond to those of the homonymous province) currently elects eight deputies. The electoral system uses the D'Hondt method and closed-list proportional voting, with a minimum threshold of three percent.

== Electoral system ==
The constituency was created as per the Political Reform Law and was first contested in the 1977 general election. The Law provided for the provinces of Spain to be established as multi-member districts in the Congress of Deputies, with this regulation being maintained under the Spanish Constitution of 1978. Additionally, the Constitution requires for any modification of the provincial limits to be approved under an organic law, needing an absolute majority in the Cortes Generales.

Voting is based on universal suffrage, comprising all Spanish nationals over 18 years of age with full political rights, provided that they have not been deprived of the right to vote by a final sentence. The only exception was in 1977, when this was limited to nationals over 21 years of age and in full enjoyment of their political and civil rights. Amendments in 2011 required non-resident citizens to apply for voting, a system known as "begged" voting (Spanish: Voto rogado). which was abolished in 2022. Further, amendments in 2018 granted the right to vote to those legally incapacitated. The Congress of Deputies has a minimum of 300 and a maximum of 400 seats, with electoral provisions fixing its size at 350. Of these, 348 are elected in 50 multi-member constituencies corresponding to the provinces of Spain—each of which is assigned an initial minimum of two seats and the remaining 248 distributed in proportion to population—using the D'Hondt method and closed-list proportional voting, with a three percent-threshold of valid votes (including blank ballots) in each constituency. The remaining two seats are allocated to Ceuta and Melilla as single-member districts elected by plurality voting. The use of this electoral method may result in a higher effective threshold depending on district magnitude and vote distribution. The law does not provide for by-elections to fill vacant seats; instead, any vacancies arising after the proclamation of candidates and during the legislative term are filled by the next candidates on the party lists or, when required, by designated substitutes.

The electoral law allows for parties and federations registered in the interior ministry, alliances and groupings of electors to present lists of candidates. Parties and federations intending to form an alliance are required to inform the relevant electoral commission within 10 days of the election call—15 before 1985—whereas groupings of electors need to secure the signature of at least one percent of the electorate in the constituencies for which they seek election—one permille of the electorate, with a compulsory minimum of 500 signatures, until 1985—disallowing electors from signing for more than one list. Also since 2011, parties, federations or alliances that have not obtained a mandate in either chamber of the Cortes at the preceding election are required to secure the signature of at least 0.1 percent of electors in the aforementioned constituencies. Amendments in 2007 required a balanced composition of men and women in the electoral lists, so that candidates of either sex made up at least 40 percent of the total composition; further amendments in 2024 required the use of a zipper system.

== Deputies ==
Deputies 1977–present
Key to parties UPC U.Podemos Podemos Sumar PSOE CDS NC–CCa Cs CCa UCD PP CP AP Vox
Legislature	Election	Distribution
Constituent	1977	1 / 5
1st	1979	1 / 1 / 4
2nd	1982	3 / 1 / 2
3rd	1986	3 / 2 / 2
4th	1989	3 / 2 / 2
5th	1993	2 / 2 / 3
6th	1996	2 / 2 / 3
7th	2000	1 / 2 / 4
8th	2004	3 / 1 / 4
9th	2008	4 / 4
10th	2011	2 / 1 / 5
11th	2015	2 / 2 / 1 / 3
12th	2016	2 / 2 / 1 / 3
13th	2019 (Apr)	2 / 3 / 1 / 2
14th	2019 (Nov)	1 / 3 / 1 / 2 / 1
15th	2023	1 / 3 / 3 / 1

== General elections ==
=== 2026 ===
Summary of the 29 November 2026 Congress of Deputies election results in Las Palmas
Parties and alliances	Popular vote			Seats	
Parties and alliances	Votes	%	±pp	Total	+/−
Spanish Socialist Workers' Party (PSOE)					
People's Party (PP)					
Canarian People's Unity–UPC (NC–BC, Podemos, IU, Sumar)^{1}					
Vox (Vox)					
Municipalists Canaries First–Canarian Coalition (1º CAN–CCa)					
Animalist Party with the Environment (PACMA)					
Communist Party of the Canarian People (PCPC)^{2}					
Workers' Front (FO)					
For a Fairer World (M+J)					
Canarian Liberation (LIB)			New		
Drago Canaries Party (DRG)			New		
Communist Party of the Workers of Spain (PCTE)			New		
The Party is Over (SALF)			New		
Blank Seats to Leave Empty Seats (EB)			New		
Blank ballots					
Total				8	±0
Valid votes					
Invalid votes					
Votes cast / turnout					
Abstentions					
Registered voters	939,211				
Sources
Footnotes: ^{1} Canarian People's Unity results are compared to the combined totals of Unite Canaries, New Canaries–Canarian Bloc and Zero Cuts in the 2023 election.; ^{2} Communist Party of the Canarian People results are compared to Canaries Now–Communist Party of the Canarian People totals in the 2023 election.

=== 2023 ===
Summary of the 23 July 2023 Congress of Deputies election results in Las Palmas
Parties and alliances	Popular vote			Seats	
Parties and alliances	Votes	%	±pp	Total	+/−
Spanish Socialist Workers' Party (PSOE)	175,671	33.19	+4.04	3	±0
People's Party (PP)	136,857	25.85	+4.49	3	+1
Vox (Vox)	77,343	14.61	+1.28	1	±0
Unite Canaries (Sumar)^{1}	54,369	10.27	–6.89	1	±0
New Canaries–Canarian Bloc (NC–BC)^{2}	42,430	8.02	n/a	0	–1
Canarian Coalition (CCa)^{2}	33,558	6.34	n/a	0	±0
Animalist Party with the Environment (PACMA)^{3}	3,570	0.67	–0.53	0	±0
Canaries Now–Communist Party of the Canarian People (ANC–UP–PCPC)^{4}	883	0.17	–0.21	0	±0
Workers' Front (FO)	635	0.12	New	0	±0
For a Fairer World (PUM+J)	563	0.11	±0.00	0	±0
Zero Cuts (Recortes Cero)	396	0.07	–0.03	0	±0
Blank ballots	3,062	0.58	–0.24		
Total	529,337			8	±0
Valid votes	529,337	98.96	+0.07		
Invalid votes	5,575	1.04	–0.07		
Votes cast / turnout	534,912	59.51	+3.37		
Abstentions	363,970	40.49	–3.37		
Registered voters	898,882				
Sources
Footnotes: ^{1} Unite Canaries results are compared to the combined totals of United We Can and More Country–Equo in the November 2019 election.; ^{2} Within the New Canaries–Canarian Coalition alliance in the November 2019 election.; ^{3} Animalist Party with the Environment results are compared to Animalist Party Against Mistreatment of Animals totals in the November 2019 election.; ^{4} Canaries Now–Communist Party of the Canarian People results are compared to the combined totals of Canaries Now and Communist Party of the Canarian People in the November 2019 election.

=== November 2019 ===
Summary of the 10 November 2019 Congress of Deputies election results in Las Palmas
Parties and alliances	Popular vote			Seats	
Parties and alliances	Votes	%	±pp	Total	+/−
Spanish Socialist Workers' Party (PSOE)	141,078	29.15	+0.83	3	±0
People's Party (PP)	103,375	21.36	+5.16	2	±0
United We Can (Podemos–IU)	74,648	15.43	–1.31	1	–1
Vox (Vox)	64,515	13.33	+6.32	1	+1
New Canaries–Canarian Coalition (NC–CCa–PNC)^{1}	48,028	9.92	–3.12	1	+1
Citizens–Party of the Citizenry (Cs)	28,018	5.79	–9.62	0	–1
More Country–Equo (Más País–Equo)	8,389	1.73	New	0	±0
Animalist Party Against Mistreatment of Animals (PACMA)	5,796	1.20	–0.39	0	±0
The Greens (Verdes)	1,864	0.39	New	0	±0
Canaries Now (ANC–UP)	1,110	0.23	±0.00	0	±0
Communist Party of the Canarian People (PCPC)	728	0.15	±0.00	0	±0
European Retirees Social Democratic Party (PDSJE)	713	0.15	New	0	±0
For a Fairer World (PUM+J)	552	0.11	–0.04	0	±0
Zero Cuts–Green Group (Recortes Cero–GV)	505	0.10	–0.16	0	±0
With You, We Are Democracy (Contigo)	358	0.07	New	0	±0
Humanist Party (PH)	276	0.06	–0.04	0	±0
Blank ballots	3,975	0.82	+0.04		
Total	483,928			8	±0
Valid votes	483,928	98.89	+0.24		
Invalid votes	5,426	1.11	–0.24		
Votes cast / turnout	489,354	56.14	–7.50		
Abstentions	382,374	43.86	+7.50		
Registered voters	871,728				
Sources
Footnotes: ^{1} New Canaries–Canarian Coalition results are compared to the combined totals of New Canaries and Canarian Coalition–Canarian Nationalist Party in the April 2019 election.

=== April 2019 ===
Summary of the 28 April 2019 Congress of Deputies election results in Las Palmas
Parties and alliances	Popular vote			Seats	
Parties and alliances	Votes	%	±pp	Total	+/−
Spanish Socialist Workers' Party (PSOE)	154,342	28.32	+4.57	3	+1
United We Can (Podemos–IU–Equo)	91,216	16.74	–5.80	2	±0
People's Party (PP)	88,313	16.20	–17.69	2	–1
Citizens–Party of the Citizenry (Cs)	84,015	15.41	+2.44	1	±0
Vox (Vox)	38,229	7.01	+6.83	0	±0
New Canaries (NCa)	36,225	6.65	New	0	±0
Canarian Coalition–Canarian Nationalist Party (CCa–PNC)	34,853	6.39	+2.81	0	±0
Animalist Party Against Mistreatment of Animals (PACMA)	8,669	1.59	+0.25	0	±0
Zero Cuts–Green Group (Recortes Cero–GV)	1,439	0.26	–0.05	0	±0
Canaries Now (ANC–UP)^{1}	1,263	0.23	+0.09	0	±0
For a Fairer World (PUM+J)	837	0.15	New	0	±0
Communist Party of the Canarian People (PCPC)	831	0.15	–0.03	0	±0
Humanist Party (PH)	559	0.10	+0.01	0	±0
Blank ballots	4,261	0.78	+0.08		
Total	545,052			8	±0
Valid votes	545,052	98.65	–0.08		
Invalid votes	7,439	1.35	+0.08		
Votes cast / turnout	552,491	63.64	+3.26		
Abstentions	315,695	36.36	–3.26		
Registered voters	868,186				
Sources
Footnotes: ^{1} Canaries Now results are compared to Unity of the People totals in the 2016 election.

=== 2016 ===
Summary of the 26 June 2016 Congress of Deputies election results in Las Palmas
Parties and alliances	Popular vote			Seats	
Parties and alliances	Votes	%	±pp	Total	+/−
People's Party (PP)	170,316	33.89	+5.72	3	±0
Spanish Socialist Workers' Party–New Canaries (PSOE–NCa)	119,351	23.75	+1.37	2	±0
United We Can (Podemos–IU–Equo)^{1}	113,256	22.54	–6.88	2	±0
Citizens–Party of the Citizenry (C's)	65,172	12.97	+0.69	1	±0
Canarian Coalition–Canarian Nationalist Party (CCa–PNC)	17,982	3.58	–0.64	0	±0
Animalist Party Against Mistreatment of Animals (PACMA)	6,730	1.34	+0.30	0	±0
Zero Cuts–Green Group (Recortes Cero–GV)	1,552	0.31	+0.02	0	±0
Union, Progress and Democracy (UPyD)	978	0.19	–0.31	0	±0
Communist Party of the Canarian People (PCPC)	900	0.18	±0.00	0	±0
Vox (Vox)	882	0.18	+0.03	0	±0
Unity of the People (UP)^{2}	686	0.14	–0.17	0	±0
Together for Canaries (JxC)	537	0.11	New	0	±0
Humanist Party (PH)	450	0.09	±0.00	0	±0
Internationalist Solidarity and Self-Management (SAIn)	212	0.04	–0.02	0	±0
Blank ballots	3,502	0.70	–0.10		
Total	502,506			8	±0
Valid votes	502,506	98.73	+0.17		
Invalid votes	6,451	1.27	–0.17		
Votes cast / turnout	508,957	60.38	–2.07		
Abstentions	333,959	39.62	+2.07		
Registered voters	842,916				
Sources
Footnotes: ^{1} United We Can results are compared to the combined totals of We Can and Canarian United Left–Popular Unity in Common in the 2015 election.; ^{2} Unity of the People results are compared to Canaries Decides totals in the 2015 election.

=== 2015 ===
Summary of the 20 December 2015 Congress of Deputies election results in Las Palmas
Parties and alliances	Popular vote			Seats	
Parties and alliances	Votes	%	±pp	Total	+/−
People's Party (PP)	145,372	28.17	–22.86	3	–2
We Can (Podemos)	136,583	26.46	New	2	+2
Spanish Socialist Workers' Party–New Canaries (PSOE–NCa)	115,521	22.38	–3.78	2	±0
Citizens–Party of the Citizenry (C's)	63,385	12.28	New	1	+1
Canarian Coalition–Canarian Nationalist Party (CCa–PNC)^{1}	21,788	4.22	–7.08	0	–1
Canarian United Left–Popular Unity in Common (IUC–UPeC)^{2}	15,262	2.96	–1.27	0	±0
Animalist Party Against Mistreatment of Animals (PACMA)	5,351	1.04	+0.61	0	±0
Union, Progress and Democracy (UPyD)	2,564	0.50	–2.17	0	±0
Canaries Decides (LV–UP–ALTER)^{3}	1,605	0.31	+0.07	0	±0
Zero Cuts–Green Group (Recortes Cero–GV)	1,478	0.29	New	0	±0
Communist Party of the Canarian People (PCPC)	953	0.18	–0.13	0	±0
Vox (Vox)	774	0.15	New	0	±0
For a Fairer World (PUM+J)	616	0.12	–0.15	0	±0
Humanist Party (PH)	439	0.09	–0.13	0	±0
Internationalist Solidarity and Self-Management (SAIn)	300	0.06	–0.01	0	±0
Blank ballots	4,111	0.80	–0.68		
Total	516,102			8	±0
Valid votes	516,102	98.56	+0.33		
Invalid votes	7,535	1.44	–0.33		
Votes cast / turnout	523,637	62.45	+1.96		
Abstentions	314,906	37.55	–1.96		
Registered voters	838,543				
Sources
Footnotes: ^{1} Canarian Coalition–Canarian Nationalist Party results are compared to Canarian Coalition–New Canaries totals in the 2011 election.; ^{2} Canarian United Left–Popular Unity in Common results are compared to Green and Red Canaries totals in the 2011 election.; ^{3} Canaries Decides results are compared to Unity of the People totals in the 2011 election.

=== 2011 ===
Summary of the 20 November 2011 Congress of Deputies election results in Las Palmas
Parties and alliances	Popular vote			Seats	
Parties and alliances	Votes	%	±pp	Total	+/−
People's Party (PP)	240,897	51.03	+11.33	5	+1
Spanish Socialist Workers' Party (PSOE)	123,486	26.16	–16.40	2	–2
Canarian Coalition–New Canaries (CC–NC–PNC)^{1}	53,329	11.30	–2.35	1	+1
Green and Red Canaries: Plural Left (IUC–CxI–PSyEP)^{2}	19,971	4.23	+3.14	0	±0
Union, Progress and Democracy (UPyD)	13,208	2.80	+2.44	0	±0
Equo (Equo)	5,414	1.15	New	0	±0
Animalist Party Against Mistreatment of Animals (PACMA)	2,012	0.43	+0.31	0	±0
Communist Party of the Peoples of Spain (PCPE)	1,460	0.31	+0.17	0	±0
For a Fairer World (PUM+J)	1,288	0.27	+0.19	0	±0
Unity of the People (UP)	1,138	0.24	+0.15	0	±0
Humanist Party (PH)	1,051	0.22	+0.14	0	±0
Canarian Nationalist Alternative (ANC)	987	0.21	+0.14	0	±0
Communist Unification of Spain (UCE)	541	0.11	New	0	±0
Internationalist Solidarity and Self-Management (SAIn)	316	0.07	+0.02	0	±0
Blank ballots	6,990	1.48	+0.67		
Total	472,088			8	±0
Valid votes	472,088	98.23	–1.00		
Invalid votes	8,515	1.77	+1.00		
Votes cast / turnout	480,603	60.49	–6.32		
Abstentions	313,919	39.51	+6.32		
Registered voters	794,522				
Sources
Footnotes: ^{1} Canarian Coalition–New Canaries results are compared to the combined totals of Canarian Coalition–Canarian Nationalist Party–Lanzarote Independents and New Canaries–Canarian Centre in the 2008 election.; ^{2} Green and Red Canaries results are compared to Canarian United Left totals in the 2008 election.

=== 2008 ===
Summary of the 9 March 2008 Congress of Deputies election results in Las Palmas
Parties and alliances	Popular vote			Seats	
Parties and alliances	Votes	%	±pp	Total	+/−
Spanish Socialist Workers' Party (PSOE)	215,560	42.56	+8.64	4	+1
People's Party (PP)	201,067	39.70	–2.51	4	±0
New Canaries–Canarian Centre (NC–CCN)	38,024	7.51	New	0	±0
Canarian Coalition–Nationalist Party–Lanzarote Independents (CC–PNC–PIL)	31,103	6.14	–11.92	0	–1
Canarian United Left–Alternative (IUC)	5,532	1.09	–0.90	0	±0
The Greens (Verdes)	2,886	0.57	New	0	±0
Union, Progress and Democracy (UPyD)	1,827	0.36	New	0	±0
The Greens–Green Group (LV–GV)	1,231	0.24	–1.03	0	±0
Communist Party of the Canarian People (PCPC)	712	0.14	–0.07	0	±0
Anti-Bullfighting Party Against Mistreatment of Animals (PACMA)	631	0.12	New	0	±0
Unity of the People (UP)	454	0.09	New	0	±0
Humanist Party (PH)	429	0.08	–0.03	0	±0
For a Fairer World (PUM+J)	411	0.08	New	0	±0
Social Democratic Party (PSD)	387	0.08	New	0	±0
Canarian Nationalist Alternative (ANC)	376	0.07	New	0	±0
Internationalist Solidarity and Self-Management (SAIn)	235	0.05	New	0	±0
National Democracy (DN)	219	0.04	–0.01	0	±0
Movement for the Unity of the Canarian People (MUPC)	211	0.04	New	0	±0
Spanish Alternative (AES)	207	0.04	New	0	±0
Citizens for Blank Votes (CenB)	207	0.04	New	0	±0
Citizens–Party of the Citizenry (C's)	195	0.04	New	0	±0
Family and Life Party (PFyV)	191	0.04	New	0	±0
Spanish Phalanx of the CNSO (FE de las JONS)	174	0.03	–0.03	0	±0
Authentic Phalanx (FA)	109	0.02	–0.03	0	±0
Blank ballots	4,078	0.81	–0.41		
Total	506,456			8	±0
Valid votes	506,456	99.23	–0.10		
Invalid votes	3,935	0.77	+0.10		
Votes cast / turnout	510,391	66.81	–0.91		
Abstentions	253,566	33.19	+0.91		
Registered voters	763,957				

=== 2004 ===
Summary of the 14 March 2004 Congress of Deputies election results in Las Palmas
Parties and alliances	Popular vote			Seats	
Parties and alliances	Votes	%	±pp	Total	+/−
People's Party (PP)	208,995	42.21	–5.84	4	±0
Spanish Socialist Workers' Party (PSOE)	167,926	33.92	+15.52	3	+2
Canarian Coalition (CC)	89,420	18.06	–7.72	1	–1
The Greens–United Left–Citizens' Alternative Initiative (LV–IU–AC25M)	9,876	1.99	–0.50	0	±0
The Greens–Green Group (LV–GV)	6,301	1.27	New	0	±0
Canarian Popular Alternative (APCa)	1,204	0.24	New	0	±0
Communist Party of the Canarian People (PCPC)	1,044	0.21	+0.04	0	±0
Alternative for Gran Canaria (AxGC)	957	0.19	New	0	±0
Democratic and Social Centre (CDS)	788	0.16	+0.06	0	±0
Humanist Party (PH)	554	0.11	–0.03	0	±0
Nationalist Maga Alternative (AMAGA)	468	0.09	New	0	±0
Republican Left (IR)	337	0.07	New	0	±0
National Democracy (DN)	307	0.06	New	0	±0
Spanish Phalanx of the CNSO (FE de las JONS)	288	0.06	New	0	±0
Authentic Phalanx (FA)	248	0.05	New	0	±0
The Phalanx (FE)	220	0.04	–0.07	0	±0
Republican Social Movement (MSR)	155	0.03	New	0	±0
Blank ballots	6,049	1.22	+0.32		
Total	495,137			8	+1
Valid votes	495,137	99.33	+0.10		
Invalid votes	3,355	0.67	–0.10		
Votes cast / turnout	498,492	67.72	+6.14		
Abstentions	237,665	32.28	–6.14		
Registered voters	736,157				

=== 2000 ===
Summary of the 12 March 2000 Congress of Deputies election results in Las Palmas
Parties and alliances	Popular vote			Seats	
Parties and alliances	Votes	%	±pp	Total	+/−
People's Party (PP)	210,774	48.05	+5.64	4	+1
Canarian Coalition (CC)	113,075	25.78	+1.76	2	±0
Spanish Socialist Workers' Party–Progressives (PSOE–p)	80,695	18.40	–7.45	1	–1
Canarian United Left (IUC)	10,941	2.49	–3.24	0	±0
Lanzarote Independents Party (PIL)	10,323	2.35	New	0	±0
The Greens of Canaries (Verdes)	4,982	1.14	New	0	±0
Progressives of Canaries Unity (UP–CAN)	980	0.22	New	0	±0
Communist Party of the Canarian People (PCPC)	752	0.17	±0.00	0	±0
Humanist Party (PH)	630	0.14	+0.04	0	±0
The Phalanx (FE)	478	0.11	New	0	±0
Centrist Union–Democratic and Social Centre (UC–CDS)	437	0.10	+0.02	0	±0
Pensionist Assembly of the Canaries (TPC)	319	0.07	New	0	±0
Natural Law Party (PLN)	301	0.07	New	0	±0
Blank ballots	3,969	0.90	+0.26		
Total	438,656			7	±0
Valid votes	438,656	99.23	–0.29		
Invalid votes	3,390	0.77	+0.29		
Votes cast / turnout	442,046	61.58	–9.65		
Abstentions	275,834	38.42	+9.65		
Registered voters	717,880				

=== 1996 ===
Summary of the 3 March 1996 Congress of Deputies election results in Las Palmas
Parties and alliances	Popular vote			Seats	
Parties and alliances	Votes	%	±pp	Total	+/−
People's Party (PP)	194,812	42.41	+4.30	3	±0
Spanish Socialist Workers' Party (PSOE)	118,769	25.85	+1.01	2	±0
Canarian Coalition (CC)	110,338	24.02	–0.47	2	±0
Canarian United Left (IUC)	26,305	5.73	+0.40	0	±0
The Greens–Green Group (LV–GV)	1,823	0.40	New	0	±0
Popular Front of the Canary Islands (FREPIC)	1,496	0.33	New	0	±0
Communist Party of the Canarian People (PCPC)	765	0.17	–0.04	0	±0
Nationalist Canarian Party (PCN)	722	0.16	New	0	±0
Green Left of the Canary Islands (Izegzawen)	609	0.13	New	0	±0
Humanist Party (PH)	473	0.10	+0.04	0	±0
Centrist Union (UC)	362	0.08	–0.89	0	±0
Blank ballots	2,919	0.64	–0.08		
Total	459,393			7	±0
Valid votes	459,393	99.52	+0.34		
Invalid votes	2,205	0.48	–0.34		
Votes cast / turnout	461,598	71.23	+0.26		
Abstentions	186,449	28.77	–0.26		
Registered voters	648,047				

=== 1993 ===
Summary of the 6 June 1993 Congress of Deputies election results in Las Palmas
Parties and alliances	Popular vote			Seats	
Parties and alliances	Votes	%	±pp	Total	+/−
People's Party (PP)	160,131	38.11	+17.41	3	+1
Spanish Socialist Workers' Party (PSOE)	104,367	24.84	–7.21	2	–1
Canarian Coalition (CC)^{1}	102,913	24.49	+22.70	2	+2
Canarian United Left (IUC)	22,382	5.33	–4.77	0	±0
Party of Gran Canaria (PGC)	15,246	3.63	New	0	±0
Democratic and Social Centre (CDS)	4,064	0.97	–23.31	0	–2
The Greens (Verdes)^{2}	2,452	0.58	–0.27	0	±0
The Ecologists (LE)	1,460	0.35	–0.38	0	±0
Insular Group of Gran Canaria (AIGRANC)	1,009	0.24	New	0	±0
Communist Party of the Canarian People (PCPC)	884	0.21	–0.07	0	±0
Ruiz-Mateos Group–European Democratic Alliance (ARM–ADE)	634	0.15	–1.60	0	±0
Workers' Socialist Party (PST)	563	0.13	–0.30	0	±0
Coalition for a New Socialist Party (CNPS)	326	0.08	New	0	±0
Tagoror Party (Tagoror)	278	0.07	–0.06	0	±0
Humanist Party (PH)	262	0.06	–0.10	0	±0
Natural Law Party (PLN)	189	0.04	New	0	±0
Coalition for Free Canaries (CCL)	0	0.00	New	0	±0
Blank ballots	3,029	0.72	+0.22		
Total	420,189			7	±0
Valid votes	420,189	99.18	–0.01		
Invalid votes	3,462	0.82	+0.01		
Votes cast / turnout	423,651	70.97	+7.43		
Abstentions	173,333	29.03	–7.43		
Registered voters	596,984				
Sources
Footnotes: ^{1} Canarian Coalition results are compared to Canarian Independent Groups totals in the 1989 election.; ^{2} The Greens results are compared to The Greens–Green List totals in the 1989 election.

=== 1989 ===
Summary of the 29 October 1989 Congress of Deputies election results in Las Palmas
Parties and alliances	Popular vote			Seats	
Parties and alliances	Votes	%	±pp	Total	+/−
Spanish Socialist Workers' Party (PSOE)	113,675	32.05	–0.55	3	±0
Democratic and Social Centre (CDS)	86,121	24.28	+3.14	2	±0
People's Party (PP)^{1}	73,443	20.70	–7.40	2	±0
United Left–United Canarian Left (IU–ICU)	35,818	10.10	+4.52	0	±0
Canarian Nationalist Assembly (ACN)^{2}	13,244	3.73	–2.39	0	±0
Independents of Gran Canaria (IGC)	6,371	1.80	New	0	±0
Canarian Independent Groups (AIC)	6,333	1.79	–0.19	0	±0
Ruiz-Mateos Group (Ruiz-Mateos)	6,211	1.75	New	0	±0
The Greens–Green List (LV–LV)	2,999	0.85	New	0	±0
The Ecologist Greens (LVE)	2,576	0.73	New	0	±0
Workers' Socialist Party (PST)	1,523	0.43	–0.10	0	±0
Seven Green Stars (SEV)	1,411	0.40	New	0	±0
Communist Party of the Canarian People (PCPC)	979	0.28	New	0	±0
Workers' Party of Spain–Communist Unity (PTE–UC)	810	0.23	New	0	±0
Humanist Party (PH)	574	0.16	New	0	±0
Lanzarote Assembly (Tagoror)	472	0.13	New	0	±0
Spanish Phalanx of the CNSO (FE–JONS)	391	0.11	–0.09	0	±0
Communist Party of Spain (Marxist–Leninist) (PCE (m–l))^{3}	0	0.00	–0.28	0	±0
Blank ballots	1,782	0.50	+0.07		
Total	354,733			7	±0
Valid votes	354,733	99.19	+1.56		
Invalid votes	2,884	0.81	–1.56		
Votes cast / turnout	357,617	63.54	–7.41		
Abstentions	205,188	36.46	+7.41		
Registered voters	562,805				
Sources
Footnotes: ^{1} People's Party results are compared to People's Coalition totals in the 1986 election.; ^{2} Canarian Nationalist Assembly results are compared to Canarian Assembly–Canarian Nationalist Left totals in the 1986 election.; ^{3} Communist Party of Spain (Marxist–Leninist) results are compared to Republican Popular Unity totals in the 1986 election.

=== 1986 ===
Summary of the 22 June 1986 Congress of Deputies election results in Las Palmas
Parties and alliances	Popular vote			Seats	
Parties and alliances	Votes	%	±pp	Total	+/−
Spanish Socialist Workers' Party (PSOE)	113,905	32.60	–0.02	3	±0
People's Coalition (AP–PDP–PL)^{1}	98,173	28.10	–1.04	2	±0
Democratic and Social Centre (CDS)	73,842	21.14	+15.26	2	+2
Canarian Assembly–Canarian Nationalist Left (AC–INC)	21,393	6.12	+2.35	0	±0
United Canarian Left (ICU)	19,508	5.58	New	0	±0
Democratic Reformist Party (PRD)	7,793	2.23	New	0	±0
Canarian Independent Groups (AIC)	6,927	1.98	New	0	±0
Workers' Socialist Party (PST)	1,851	0.53	+0.01	0	±0
Communist Unification of Spain (UCE)	1,415	0.41	+0.23	0	±0
Internationalist Socialist Workers' Party (POSI)	1,389	0.40	New	0	±0
Republican Popular Unity (UPR)^{2}	967	0.28	+0.09	0	±0
Spanish Phalanx of the CNSO (FE–JONS)	692	0.20	New	0	±0
Union of the Democratic Centre (UCD)	n/a	n/a	–13.69	0	–1
Blank ballots	1,519	0.43	–0.09		
Total	349,374			7	+1
Valid votes	349,374	97.63	+0.97		
Invalid votes	8,469	2.37	–0.97		
Votes cast / turnout	357,843	70.95	–5.86		
Abstentions	146,504	29.05	+5.86		
Registered voters	504,347				
Sources
Footnotes: ^{1} People's Coalition results are compared to People's Alliance–People's Democratic Party totals in the 1982 election.; ^{2} Republican Popular Unity results are compared to Communist Party of Spain (Marxist–Leninist) totals in the 1982 election.

=== 1982 ===
Summary of the 28 October 1982 Congress of Deputies election results in Las Palmas
Parties and alliances	Popular vote			Seats	
Parties and alliances	Votes	%	±pp	Total	+/−
Spanish Socialist Workers' Party (PSOE)	109,366	32.62	+18.16	3	+2
People's Alliance–People's Democratic Party (AP–PDP)^{1}	97,701	29.14	+26.15	2	+2
Union of the Democratic Centre (UCD)	45,905	13.69	–46.02	1	–3
Canarian Convergence (CC)	25,792	7.69	New	0	±0
Democratic and Social Centre (CDS)	19,705	5.88	New	0	±0
Canarian People's Union (UPC)	16,241	4.84	–8.47	0	–1
Canarian Assembly–Canarian Coordinator (AC–CC)	12,625	3.77	New	0	±0
Workers' Socialist Party (PST)	1,746	0.52	New	0	±0
Canarian Nationalist Party (PNC)	1,051	0.31	New	0	±0
New Force (FN)^{2}	758	0.23	–0.54	0	±0
Communist Party of Spain (Marxist–Leninist) (PCE (m-l))	625	0.19	New	0	±0
Communist Unification of Spain (UCE)	602	0.18	New	0	±0
Spanish Solidarity (SE)	574	0.17	New	0	±0
Revolutionary Communist League (LCR)	443	0.13	–0.16	0	±0
Communist League–Internationalist Socialist Workers' Coalition (LC (COSI))	417	0.12	New	0	±0
United Canarian People (PCU)	0	0.00	New	0	±0
Socialist Party (PS)	0	0.00	New	0	±0
Blank ballots	1,748	0.52	+0.16		
Total	335,299			6	±0
Valid votes	335,299	96.66	–0.31		
Invalid votes	11,574	3.34	+0.31		
Votes cast / turnout	346,873	76.81	+6.32		
Abstentions	104,707	23.19	–6.32		
Registered voters	451,580				
Sources
Footnotes: ^{1} People's Alliance–People's Democratic Party results are compared to Democratic Coalition totals in the 1979 election.; ^{2} New Force results are compared to National Union totals in the 1979 election.

=== 1979 ===
Summary of the 1 March 1979 Congress of Deputies election results in Las Palmas
Parties and alliances	Popular vote			Seats	
Parties and alliances	Votes	%	±pp	Total	+/−
Union of the Democratic Centre (UCD)	171,842	59.71	–6.29	4	–1
Spanish Socialist Workers' Party (PSOE)^{1}	41,616	14.46	–2.01	1	±0
Canarian People's Union (UPC)	38,304	13.31	New	1	+1
Party of the Canarian Country (PPC)	10,099	3.51	New	0	±0
Democratic Coalition (CD)^{2}	8,607	2.99	–2.63	0	±0
Communist Party of the Canaries (PCC–PCE)	8,245	2.86	+0.23	0	±0
National Union (UN)	2,218	0.77	New	0	±0
Party of Labour of Spain (PTE)^{3}	1,315	0.46	–0.06	0	±0
Workers' Revolutionary Organization (ORT)	1,165	0.40	New	0	±0
Republican Left (IR)	1,019	0.35	New	0	±0
Revolutionary Communist League (LCR)	826	0.29	New	0	±0
Carlist Party (PC)	774	0.27	New	0	±0
Union for the Freedom of Speech (ULE)	736	0.26	New	0	±0
Blank ballots	1,024	0.36	+0.06		
Total	287,790			6	±0
Valid votes	287,790	96.97	–1.11		
Invalid votes	8,993	3.03	+1.11		
Votes cast / turnout	296,783	70.49	–8.75		
Abstentions	124,220	29.51	+8.75		
Registered voters	421,003				
Sources
Footnotes: ^{1} Spanish Socialist Workers' Party results are compared to the combined totals of Spanish Socialist Workers' Party and People's Socialist Party–Socialist Unity in the 1977 election.; ^{2} Democratic Coalition results are compared to People's Alliance totals in the 1977 election.; ^{3} Party of Labour of Spain results are compared to Democratic Left Front totals in the 1977 election.

=== 1977 ===
Summary of the 15 June 1977 Congress of Deputies election results in Las Palmas
Parties and alliances	Popular vote			Seats	
Parties and alliances	Votes	%	±pp	Total	+/−
Union of the Democratic Centre (UCD)	187,254	66.00	n/a	5	n/a
Spanish Socialist Workers' Party (PSOE)	39,616	13.96	n/a	1	n/a
United Canarian People (PCU)	17,717	6.25	n/a	0	n/a
People's Alliance (AP)	15,944	5.62	n/a	0	n/a
Communist Party of the Canaries (PCC–PCE)	7,467	2.63	n/a	0	n/a
People's Socialist Party–Socialist Unity (PSP–US)	7,130	2.51	n/a	0	n/a
Socialist Party of Canaries (PSCan)	2,384	0.84	n/a	0	n/a
Canarian People's Party (PPCan)	1,882	0.66	n/a	0	n/a
Democratic Left Front (FDI)	1,476	0.52	n/a	0	n/a
Spanish Social Reform (RSE)	1,154	0.41	n/a	0	n/a
Spanish Phalanx of the CNSO (Authentic) (FE–JONS(A))	817	0.29	n/a	0	n/a
Blank ballots	857	0.30	n/a		
Total	283,698			6	n/a
Valid votes	283,698	98.08	n/a		
Invalid votes	5,562	1.92	n/a		
Votes cast / turnout	289,260	79.24	n/a		
Abstentions	75,803	20.76	n/a		
Registered voters	365,063				

== Bibliography ==
- Ley 1/1977, de 4 de enero, para la Reforma Política (Fundamental Law 1/1977). Official State Gazette (in Spanish). 4 January 1977. BOE-A-1977-165.
- Real Decreto-ley 20/1977, de 18 de marzo, sobre Normas Electorales (Royal Decree-Law 20/1977). Official State Gazette (in Spanish). 18 March 1977. BOE-A-1977-7445.
- Constitución Española (Constitution). Official State Gazette (in Spanish). 27 December 1978. BOE-A-1978-31229.
- Ley Orgánica 5/1985, de 19 de junio, del Régimen Electoral General (Organic Law 5/1985). Official State Gazette (in Spanish). 19 June 1985. BOE-A-1985-11672.
- Carreras de Odriozola, Albert; Tafunell Sambola, Xavier (2005) [1989]. Estadísticas históricas de España, siglos XIX-XX (PDF) (in Spanish). Vol. 1 (II ed.). Bilbao: Fundación BBVA. pp. 1072–1097. ISBN 84-96515-00-1. Archived from the original (PDF) on 24 September 2015.
