= Workers' Party (Spain) =

Workers' Party Partido de los Trabajadores
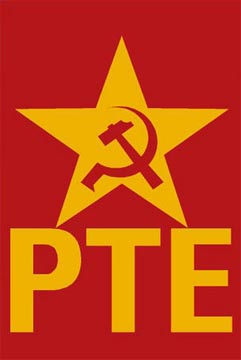
- Secretary-General: Marc Palomo
- Founded: 1979; Refounded in 2009
- Dissolved: 1987–2009
- Merger of: Party of Labour of Spain; Workers Revolutionary Organisation
- Newspaper: Yesca
- Youth wing: Young Red Guard of Spain
- Ideology: Marxism-Leninism; Maoism; Antifascism; Federalism
- Political position: Far Left
- Trade union affiliation: Confederación de Sindicatos Unitarios de Trabajadores (CSUT) and Sindicato Unitario
- Regional parliaments (1979-1983): 1 / 1,268
- Provincial deputations (1979-1983): 1 / 1,152
- Mayors (1979-1983): 20 / 8,122
- Town councillors (1979-1983): 369 / 67,505

Workers' Party (in Spanish: Partido de los Trabajadores) is a communist political party which operates in Spain. It was founded in 1979 through the merger of the Party of Labour of Spain (PTE) and the Workers Revolutionary Organisation (ORT).

The Catalan branch of PT was known as Partit dels Treballadors de Catalunya (Workers' Party of Catalonia). It published Yesca.

The old PT was short-lived. In 1980, a severe internal crisis erupted, and the party last contested elections in 1987.

In February 2009, it was refunded and reactivated, becoming an active political organization again.
