= Sindicato Unitario =

Trade Union

- Founded: May 1, 1977
- Location: Spain
- Members: 47,000 (1977)
- Key people: José Miguel Ibarrola, general secretary

Sindicato Unitario ("Unitary Trade Union", abbreviated SU) is a trade union movement in Spain. SU was tied to the Workers Revolutionary Organization (ORT), a Maoist political organization.

== Split in CC.OO. ==
The organization emerged from a split away from Comisiones Obreras (CC.OO.) trade union movement in 1976. ORT was part of the 'Minority Tendency' inside CC.OO. A meeting was held on November 7, 1976 in Coslada at which opponents to the CC.OO. leadership gathered. The CC.OO. dissidents opposed the dominance of the Communist Party of Spain (PCE) in CC.OO. However, the dissident unionists gathered in Coslada were split in two. One group went on to form CSUT. The other, led by José Miguel Ibarrola, formed SU.

== Founding congress ==
SU was founded at a clandestine congress on May 1, 1977 in Madrid. The civil government of Madrid had prohibited the group from holding the congress, citing concerns about disturbances to the 'public order'. Around one thousand unionists had gathered. The congress approved the name, symbol and statues of the new organization.

The organization identified itself as a class-based union, seeking to engage in class struggle. SU rejected the Moncloa Pact.

Ibarrola was elected general secretary of SU. Cristino Domenech was elected second secretary. Five other secretariat members were elected; Jesús San Martín, Luis Royo, Pedro Cristóbal, Paco Esteban and María del Carmen Fraile. SU had invited other unions to the closing session of the congress, but only CSUT and a French group called 'Revolutionary Trade Union Opposition' were present.

== Organization ==
At the time of its foundation SU was estimated to have a membership of 47,000. Its strongholds were Navarre, Cantabria, Madrid, Cáceres, Badajoz, Burgos and Murcia. In June 1977, a statewide council of SU was elected.

As of 1978, the organization had 217 offices across the country. Cristino Domenech was the first secretary of SU in Madrid. At the time, SU claimed a membership of 500,000.

== 1978 trade union election ==
In the 1978 trade union elections SU raised the slogan "Un frente común por el pan, el trabajo y la libertad" ('A common front for bread, work and freedom'). SU won 3,376 delegate seats across Spain (2.7% of the seats elected).

SU emerged as a major force in Navarre in the polls. In Navarre, the majority that had been active in Comisiones Obreras had left to build SU. According to the official count, SU had won 269 delegates out of a total of 2,614 (becoming the largest trade union in the fray). However a count made by Diario de Navarra presented different numbers, putting SU at 432 seats (15.23%, just behind CC.OO.). SU also obtained high numbers of delegates in Huelva province, where it won 248 delegates (23.4%).

SU won the election at the conservative newspaper ABC in Madrid. At the Barajas printing centre, SU won 7 out of the 13 committee seats. At the calle Serrano editorial and administrative office, SU won 7 out of 22 seats.

SU dedicated its May Day rally of 1978 to highlighting its opposition to the Moncloa Pact. According to Guardia Civil, 4,000 people took part in the SU rally in Madrid (SU itself claimed a participation of 50,000).

== Second Congress ==
The second congress of SU convened in Madrid on May 25, 1978. Around one thousand delegates took part in the event, which had the slogan 'Common front against the Social Pact'. The dias carried the portrait of Joaquín Macías, a SU leader from Badajoz that had died in an accident. A number of international delegations visited the congress, from Germany, France, Argentina, Italy and Portugal. The congress approved new statues for the organization.

== Decline ==
The electoral failures of ORT in the 1977 general election had a negative impact on the movement. SU would never recover from this set-back. By 1979 the SU membership was estimated at 17,000. As ORT moved ahead towards a merger with the Party of Labour of Spain (PTE), SU and CSUT (the PTE labour wing) entered into a unification process. The process did however not proceed smoothly, as there were differences regarding the organizational structure and the national question.

The third congress SU was held in June 1980. At the congress Ibarrola discarded the possibility of a merger with CSUT. Instead the majority of the SU leadership proposed taking part in unity processes from below, such as the Confederación Sindical Galega. A minority, headed by Miguel Jesús Sánchez (provincial secretary from SU in Valladolid and member of the confederal secretariat of SU) and supported by the SU organizations in Madrid and Biscay, argued in favour of a merger with CC.OO.

SU applied for membership in the European Trade Union Confederation in 1980, but this request was denied as the organization was perceived as lacking representativity amongst workers in Spain.

SU and CSUT did not launch campaigns of their own ahead of the 1980 trade union elections. Rather, they took part in building workers unity slates (especially at the level of the autonomous communities).

SU continues to exist in places like Huelva, Madrid, Cantabria and Barcelona. SU is active in the Barcelona Metro, having won four delegate seats in the 2006 trade union election and three seats in 2010.
