= UJM (disambiguation) =

UJM may refer to:

- Union of Journalists of Moldova
- Universal Japanese Motorcycle, a motorcycle style
- Maoist Youth Union, Spain
