= Lanzarote (Senate constituency) =

Senate constituency in Spain

Coordinates: 29°02′N 13°37′W

- Senate of Spain; Electoral constituency
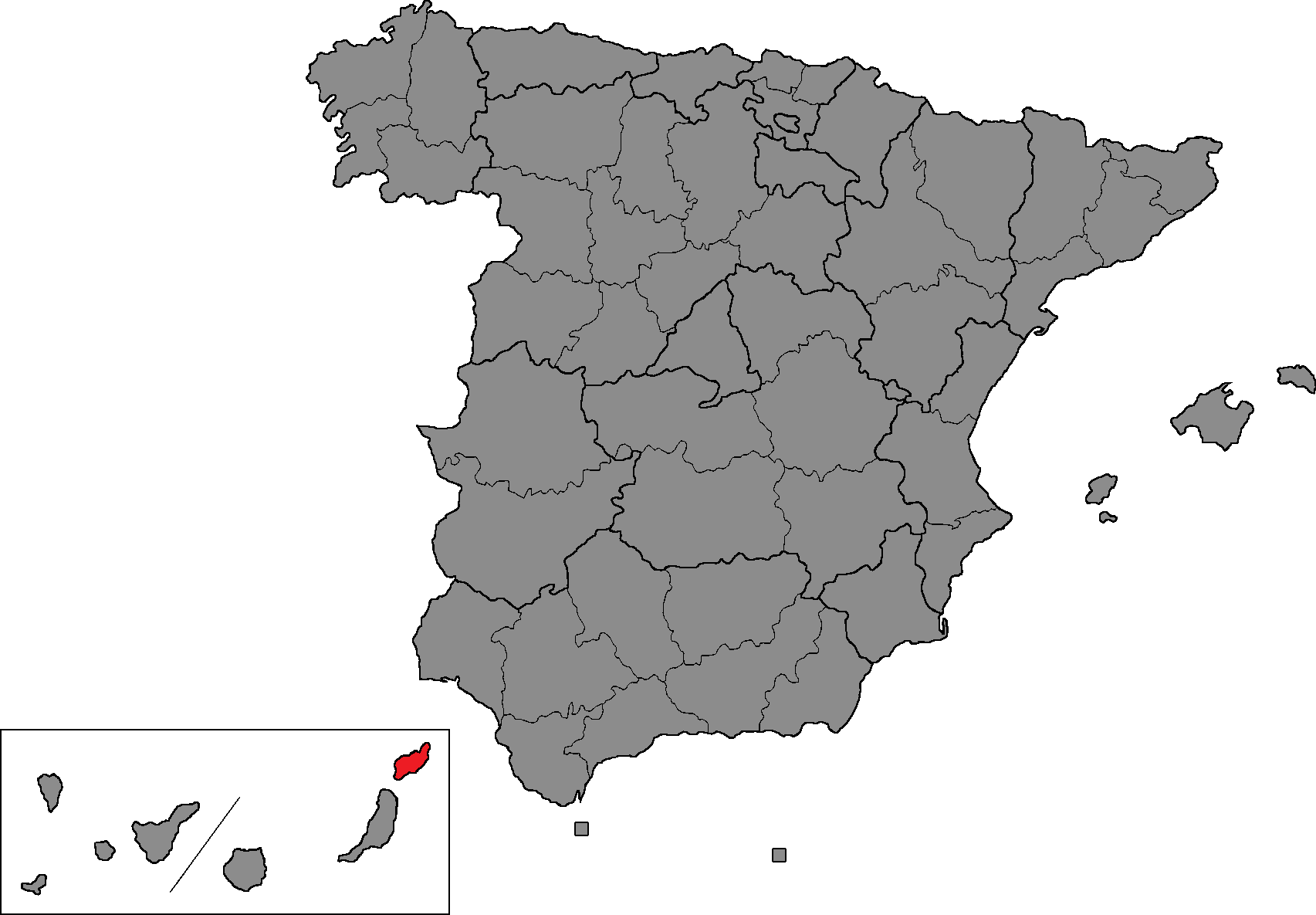
- Location of Lanzarote within Spain
- Island: Lanzarote
- Autonomous community: Canary Islands
- Population: ▲163,467 (2024)
- Electorate: ▲104,495 (2023)
- Major settlements: Arrecife

Current constituency
- Created: 1977
- Seats: 1
- Member: PSOE (1)

Lanzarote is one of the 60 constituencies represented in the Senate of Spain, the upper chamber of the Spanish parliament, the Cortes Generales. The constituency (whose boundaries correspond to those of the homonymous island) elects one senator. The electoral system uses open-list (Note: Parties can group candidates into lists, although each candidate is treated separately for the purpose of the voting procedure.) partial block voting, with electors voting for individual candidates instead of parties.

== Electoral system ==
The constituency was created as per the Political Reform Law and was first contested in the 1977 general election. The Law provided for the provinces of Spain to be established as multi-member districts in the Senate, with this regulation being maintained under the Spanish Constitution of 1978. Additionally, the Constitution requires for any modification of the provincial limits to be approved under an organic law, needing an absolute majority in the Cortes Generales.

Voting is based on universal suffrage, comprising all Spanish nationals over 18 years of age with full political rights, provided that they have not been deprived of the right to vote by a final sentence. The only exception was in 1977, when this was limited to nationals over 21 years of age and in full enjoyment of their political and civil rights. Amendments in 2011 required non-resident citizens to apply for voting, a system known as "begged" voting (Spanish: Voto rogado). which was abolished in 2022. Further, amendments in 2018 granted the right to vote to those legally incapacitated. 209 Senate seats (207 in 1977, 208 from 1978 to 2026) are elected using open-list partial block voting: voters in constituencies electing four seats can choose up to three candidates; in those with two or three seats, up to two; and in single-member districts, one. Each of the 47 peninsular provinces is allocated four seats, while in insular provinces—such as the Balearic and Canary Islands—the districts are the islands themselves, with the larger ones (Mallorca, Gran Canaria and Tenerife) being allocated three seats each, and the smaller ones (Menorca, Ibiza, Formentera, Fuerteventura, La Gomera, El Hierro, Lanzarote and La Palma) one each. (Note: La Gomera and El Hierro comprised a single constituency for the 1977 election. A constitutional reform in 2026 awarded Formentera an independent senator separate from Ibiza.) Ceuta and Melilla elect two seats each. Until 1985, the law also provided for by-elections to fill Senate seats vacated up to two years into the legislature; subsequently, any vacancies arising after the proclamation of candidates and during the legislative term are filled by the next candidates on the party lists or, when required, by designated substitutes.

The electoral law allows for parties and federations registered in the interior ministry, alliances and groupings of electors to present lists of candidates. Parties and federations intending to form an alliance are required to inform the relevant electoral commission within 10 days of the election call—15 before 1985—whereas groupings of electors need to secure the signature of at least one percent of the electorate in the constituencies for which they seek election—one permille of the electorate, with a compulsory minimum of 500 signatures, until 1985—disallowing electors from signing for more than one list. Also since 2011, parties, federations or alliances that have not obtained a mandate in either chamber of the Cortes at the preceding election are required to secure the signature of at least 0.1 percent of electors in the aforementioned constituencies. Amendments in 2007 required a balanced composition of men and women in the electoral lists, so that candidates of either sex made up at least 40 percent of the total composition; further amendments in 2024 required the use of a zipper system.

== Senators ==
Senators for Lanzarote 1977–
Key to parties Podemos PSOE PIL CCa AIC UCD PP
Legislature	Election	Distribution
Constituent	1977	1
1st	1979	1
2nd	1982	1
3rd	1986	1
4th	1989	1
5th	1993	1
6th	1996	1
7th	2000	1
8th	2004	1
9th	2008	1
10th	2011	1
11th	2015	1
12th	2016	1
13th	2019 (Apr)	1
14th	2019 (Nov)	1
15th	2023	1

== General elections ==
=== 2023 ===
Summary of the 23 July 2023 Senate of Spain election results in Lanzarote
Parties and alliances	Popular vote			Seats	
Parties and alliances	Votes	%	±pp	Total	+/−
Spanish Socialist Workers' Party (PSOE)	21,618	38.37	+7.30	1	±0
People's Party (PP)	13,822	24.53	+4.72	0	±0
Canarian Coalition (CCa)^{1}	7,449	13.22	n/a	0	±0
Vox (Vox)	5,663	10.05	+0.17	0	±0
Unite Canaries (Sumar Canarias)^{2}	5,505	9.77	−5.16	0	±0
New Canaries–Canarian Bloc (NC–BC)^{1}	1,332	2.36	n/a	0	±0
Zero Cuts (Recortes Cero)	118	0.21	−0.02	0	±0
Blank ballots (Note: The percentage of blank ballots is calculated over the official number of valid votes cast, irrespective of the total number of votes shown as a result of adding up the individual results for each party.)	830	1.47	−0.15		
Total	56,339			1	±0
Valid votes	56,339	96.78	−0.40		
Invalid votes	1,874	3.22	+0.40		
Votes cast / turnout	58,213	55.71	+4.38		
Abstentions	46,282	44.29	−4.38		
Registered voters	104,495				
Sources
Footnotes: ^{1} Within the Canarian Coalition–New Canaries alliance in the November 2019 election.; ^{2} Unite Canaries results are compared to the combined totals of United We Can and More Country–Equo in the November 2019 election.

=== November 2019 ===
Summary of the 10 November 2019 Senate of Spain election results in Lanzarote
Parties and alliances	Popular vote			Seats	
Parties and alliances	Votes	%	±pp	Total	+/−
Spanish Socialist Workers' Party (PSOE)	15,400	31.07		1	±0
People's Party (PP)	9,821	19.81		0	±0
Canarian Coalition–New Canaries (CCa–PNC–NC)^{1}	7,747	15.63		0	±0
United We Can (Podemos–IU)	6,518	13.15		0	±0
Vox (Vox)	4,898	9.88		0	±0
Citizens–Party of the Citizenry (Cs)	2,333	4.71		0	±0
More Country–Equo (Más País–Equo)	881	1.78	New	0	±0
Animalist Party Against Mistreatment of Animals (PACMA)	800	1.61		0	±0
Canaries Now (ANC–UP)	172	0.35		0	±0
Zero Cuts–Green Group (Recortes Cero–GV)	113	0.23		0	±0
Communist Party of the Canarian People (PCPC)	83	0.17		0	±0
Blank ballots	802	1.62			
Total	49,569			1	±0
Valid votes	49,569	97.18			
Invalid votes	1,436	2.82			
Votes cast / turnout	51,005	51.33			
Abstentions	48,363	48.67			
Registered voters	99,368				
Sources
Footnotes: ^{1} Canarian Coalition–New Canaries results are compared to the combined totals of Canarian Coalition–Canarian Nationalist Party and New Canaries in the April 2019 election.

=== April 2019 ===
Summary of the 28 April 2019 Senate of Spain election results in Lanzarote
Candidates	Parties and coalitions	Popular vote	
Candidates	Parties and coalitions	Votes	%
Francisco Manuel Fajardo Palarea	PSOE	15,910	28.19
• Luis Celestino Arráez Guadalupe	CCa–PNC	9,838	17.43
• Remigio Joel Delgado Cáceres	PP	9,463	16.77
• Jorge Miguel Peñas Lozano	Podemos–IU–Equo	8,252	14.62
• Noemí del Pino Ramírez Rodríguez	Cs	4,641	8.22
• Fernando Bermejo Reales	Vox	3,139	5.56
• Yone Xarach Caraballo Medina	NCa	2,205	3.91
• Bárbara Fernández Granda	PACMA	1,167	2.07
• Laureano Álvarez Delgado	UPLanzarote	456	0.81
• Nuria Esther Cedrés Perdomo	ANC–UP	181	0.32
• Concepción Jiménez Rodríguez	Recortes Cero–GV	153	0.27
• Francisca Carmen Sánchez Mácias	PCPC	67	0.12
Blank ballots		954	1.69
Total		56,429	
Valid votes		56,429	96.62
Invalid votes		1,976	3.38
Votes cast / turnout		58,405	59.19
Abstentions		40,263	40.81
Registered voters		98,668	

=== 2016 ===
Summary of the 26 June 2016 Senate of Spain election results in Lanzarote
Candidates	Parties and coalitions	Popular vote	
Candidates	Parties and coalitions	Votes	%
Remigio Joel Delgado Cáceres	PP	13,146	26.75
• Ariagona González Pérez	PSOE–NCa	11,846	24.10
• Juan Antonio Valencia Naranjo	Podemos–IU–Equo	10,095	20.54
• Marciano Acuña Betancor	CCa–PNC	7,805	15.88
• María Moreira León	C's	4,106	8.35
• Ana Isabel Díaz Cruces	PACMA	939	1.91
• Neido Manuel González Álvarez	Recortes Cero–GV	162	0.33
• Antonia María de los Ángeles León Armas	Vox	101	0.21
• Jorge García-Aráez Martín-Montalvo	PCPC	85	0.17
Blank ballots		860	1.75
Total		49,145	
Valid votes		49,145	96.53
Invalid votes		1,767	3.47
Votes cast / turnout		50,912	54.38
Abstentions		42,710	45.62
Registered voters		93,622	

=== 2015 ===
Summary of the 20 December 2015 Senate of Spain election results in Lanzarote
Candidates	Parties and coalitions	Popular vote	
Candidates	Parties and coalitions	Votes	%
José Ramón Galindo González	Podemos	10,973	22.32
• Ariagona González Pérez	PSOE–NCa	10,644	21.65
• Oscar Manuel Luzardo Fuentes	PP	9,888	20.11
• Marciano Acuña Betancor	CCa–PNC	9,253	18.82
• María del Carmen Pellón Rodríguez	C's	4,489	9.13
• José Díaz Díaz	IUC–UPeC	1,274	2.59
• Ana Isabel Díaz Cruces	PACMA	964	1.96
• Ismael Jesús Sánchez Melián	UPyD	157	0.32
• Neido Manuel González Álvarez	Recortes Cero–GV	134	0.27
• Jorge García-Aráez Martín-Montalvo	PCPC	65	0.13
Blank ballots		1,331	2.71
Total		49,172	
Valid votes		49,172	95.69
Invalid votes		2,215	4.31
Votes cast / turnout		51,387	55.53
Abstentions		41,159	44.47
Registered voters		92,546	

=== 2011 ===
Summary of the 20 November 2011 Senate of Spain election results in Lanzarote
Candidates	Parties and coalitions	Popular vote	
Candidates	Parties and coalitions	Votes	%
Oscar Manuel Luzardo Fuentes	PP	15,470	37.15
• Orlando Enrique Suárez Curbelo	PSOE	10,975	26.36
• Pedro Manuel Sanginés Gutiérrez	CC–NC–PNC	10,364	24.89
• José Manuel Vázquez Rodríguez	IUC–CxI–PSyEP	1,351	3.24
• Ignacio Sáenz de Santa María Elizalde	UPyD	786	1.89
• Gabriel Ángel Suárez Cabrera	eQuo	605	1.45
• Martín Moreno Brito	PUM+J	211	0.51
Blank ballots		1,880	4.51
Total		41,642	
Valid votes		41,642	94.65
Invalid votes		2,352	5.35
Votes cast / turnout		43,994	52.38
Abstentions		39,993	47.62
Registered voters		83,987	

=== 2008 ===
Summary of the 9 March 2008 Senate of Spain election results in Lanzarote
Candidates	Parties and coalitions	Popular vote	
Candidates	Parties and coalitions	Votes	%
Marcos Francisco Hernández Guillén	PSOE	17,118	37.24
• Jesús Casimiro Machín Duque	CC–PNC–PIL	13,357	29.06
• Astrid María Pérez Batista	PP	10,904	23.72
• Ginés de Quintana Cabrera	AC25M	773	1.68
• María Isabel Martinón López	NC–CCN	683	1.49
• Francisco Martínez Ferreira	IUC	613	1.33
• Pedro Melquiades Hernández Camacho	ISAL	449	0.98
• Diego Luis Casas García	PACMA	315	0.69
• María del Carmen Gloria Calero Fernández	PUM+J	195	0.42
• María del Pilar Peláez Arasa	LV	157	0.34
• Ignacio Sáenz de Santa María Elizalde	UPyD	154	0.34
• Nelson Roque Vega Gutiérrez	UP	126	0.27
• José Luis Morales Castillo	LV–GV	113	0.25
• Antonio de Jesús Quevedo Navarro	ANC	52	0.11
• Agustín Julio Prieto Aguilar	PH	42	0.09
• María Adoración Carpintero Cidad	POSI	29	0.06
• Ezequiel Rial-Abraldes Lobatón	FE–JONS	21	0.05
• Jesús Joaquín Betancor Valdez	MUPC	18	0.04
• Carlos Javier Lorenzo Santana	PCPC	18	0.04
• Eduardo José Hernández López	CTC	16	0.03
• Iñaki Fernández Calvo	PFyV	13	0.03
• Laura María Santana González	PSD	6	0.01
Blank ballots		795	1.73
Total		45,967	
Valid votes		45,967	96.47
Invalid votes		1,680	3.53
Votes cast / turnout		47,647	59.25
Abstentions		32,774	40.75
Registered voters		80,421	

=== 2004 ===
Summary of the 14 March 2004 Senate of Spain election results in Lanzarote
Candidates	Parties and coalitions	Popular vote	
Candidates	Parties and coalitions	Votes	%
Marcos Francisco Hernández Guillén	PSOE	13,625	32.23
• Juan Pedro Hernández Rodríguez	PIL	11,457	27.10
• Federico Toledo Guadalupe	PP	9,850	23.30
• Emilia María Morales Martín	AC25M	5,360	12.68
• María de los Ángeles Ferrera Fernández	LV–GV	454	1.07
• Delia María Hernández Camacho	CAyC	233	0.55
• Juan Manuel de León Robayna	CDS	105	0.25
• Antonio Esteban Afonso Martel	DN	23	0.05
• Luis Miguel Ruiz de Asúa Moro	CTC	19	0.04
Blank ballots		1,148	2.72
Total		42,274	
Valid votes		42,274	96.83
Invalid votes		1,386	3.17
Votes cast / turnout		43,660	58.05
Abstentions		31,554	41.95
Registered voters		75,214	

=== 2000 ===
Summary of the 12 March 2000 Senate of Spain election results in Lanzarote
Candidates	Parties and coalitions	Popular vote	
Candidates	Parties and coalitions	Votes	%
Dimas Martín Martín	PIL	13,528	37.36
• Francisco Manuel Fajardo Palarea	PSOE–p	8,308	22.94
• Cándido Armas Rodríguez	CC	6,525	18.02
• Alejandro José Díaz Hernández	PP	6,094	16.83
• José Antonio González Hernández	IUC	842	2.33
• Fernando Cabrera Tarrago	PH	93	0.26
• Andrés Manuel Perera Candelaria	FE	25	0.07
Blank ballots		799	2.21
Total		36,214	
Valid votes		36,214	97.13
Invalid votes		1,071	2.87
Votes cast / turnout		37,285	52.18
Abstentions		34,168	47.82
Registered voters		71,453	

=== 1996 ===
Summary of the 3 March 1996 Senate of Spain election results in Lanzarote
Candidates	Parties and coalitions	Popular vote	
Candidates	Parties and coalitions	Votes	%
Cándido Armas Rodríguez	PIL	13,161	37.57
• Nicolás de Páiz Pereyra	PP	10,615	30.30
• Víctor Manuel Betancor de León	PSOE	8,690	24.81
• José Antonio González Hernández	IUC	1,827	5.22
Blank ballots		738	2.11
Total		35,031	
Valid votes		35,031	97.39
Invalid votes		938	2.61
Votes cast / turnout		35,969	62.19
Abstentions		21,866	37.81
Registered voters		57,835	

=== 1993 ===
Summary of the 6 June 1993 Senate of Spain election results in Lanzarote
Candidates	Parties and coalitions	Popular vote	
Candidates	Parties and coalitions	Votes	%
Cándido Armas Rodríguez	CC (PIL–AIC)	13,487	43.53
• José María Espino González	PSOE	10,384	33.52
• Jerónimo Ramón Quevedo Guerra	PP	4,348	14.03
• Cándido Reguera Díaz	CDS	1,831	5.91
• Manuel López-Brea Ruiz	ARM–ADE	84	0.27
Blank ballots		846	2.73
Total		30,980	
Valid votes		30,980	97.18
Invalid votes		900	2.82
Votes cast / turnout		31,880	62.43
Abstentions		19,187	37.57
Registered voters		51,067	

=== 1989 ===
Summary of the 29 October 1989 Senate of Spain election results in Lanzarote
Candidates	Parties and coalitions	Popular vote	
Candidates	Parties and coalitions	Votes	%
Dimas Martín Martín	AIC–IL	17,768	65.62
• Juan Ramírez Montero	PSOE	6,987	25.81
• José Domingo Hernández Álvarez	IU–ICU	737	2.72
• Eduardo Barreto Betancor	ACN	682	2.52
• Domingo Negrín Armas	PP	611	2.26
• Álvaro Luis Martín	PST	32	0.12
• Roberto Alfonso Santana Almeida	FE–JONS	32	0.12
• Cecilia Yolanda Pérez Martín	PTE–UC	24	0.09
Blank ballots		203	0.75
Total		27,076	
Valid votes		27,076	96.33
Invalid votes		1,033	3.67
Votes cast / turnout		28,109	56.48
Abstentions		21,663	43.52
Registered voters		49,772	

=== 1986 ===
Summary of the 22 June 1986 Senate of Spain election results in Lanzarote
Candidates	Parties and coalitions	Popular vote	
Candidates	Parties and coalitions	Votes	%
Juan Ramírez Montero	PSOE	10,969	47.82
• Rafael Stinga González	AEL	9,471	41.29
• José Hernández Álvarez	ICU	1,123	4.90
• Eduardo Barreto Betancor	AC–INC	618	2.69
• Fernando Cabrera Díaz	PRD	282	1.23
• Montserrat Casale Salas	UCE	87	0.38
Blank ballots		387	1.69
Total		22,937	
Valid votes		22,937	95.29
Invalid votes		1,134	4.71
Votes cast / turnout		24,071	60.80
Abstentions		15,521	39.20
Registered voters		39,592	

=== 1982 ===
Summary of the 28 October 1982 Senate of Spain election results in Lanzarote
Candidates	Parties and coalitions	Popular vote	
Candidates	Parties and coalitions	Votes	%
José Ramírez Cerdá	PSOE	8,582	37.41
• Antonio Cabrera Barrera	UCD	6,359	27.72
• José Diaz Rijo	CDS	3,724	16.23
• José Ferrer Perdomo	AP–PDP	1,864	8.13
• José Domingo Hernández Álvarez	AC–CC	1,166	5.08
• Jesús María Curbelo Fernández	UPC	686	2.99
• Carlos Alberto Henríquez Gaztañondo	PNC	224	0.98
Blank ballots		334	1.46
Total		22,938	
Valid votes		22,938	95.89
Invalid votes		983	4.11
Votes cast / turnout		23,921	79.63
Abstentions		6,119	20.37
Registered voters		30,040	

=== 1979 ===
Summary of the 1 March 1979 Senate of Spain election results in Lanzarote
Candidates	Parties and coalitions	Popular vote	
Candidates	Parties and coalitions	Votes	%
Rafael Stinga González	UCD	9,012	47.08
• Manuel Medina Ortega	PSOE	6,676	34.87
• Fernando Domingo Curbelo Fernández	INDEP	1,698	8.87
• Antonio Félix Martín Hormiga	UPC	917	4.79
• Manuel González Barrera	PCE	553	2.89
• Eufronio Dimas García Monforte	CD	140	0.73
Blank ballots		147	0.77
Total		19,143	
Valid votes		19,143	96.63
Invalid votes		668	3.37
Votes cast / turnout		19,811	65.94
Abstentions		10,234	34.06
Registered voters		30,045	

=== 1977 ===
Summary of the 15 June 1977 Senate of Spain election results in Lanzarote
Parties and alliances	Popular vote			Seats	
Parties and alliances	Votes	%	±pp	Total	+/−
Union of the Democratic Centre (UCD)	11,884	63.08	n/a	1	n/a
People's Socialist Party–Socialist Unity (PSP–US)	3,527	18.72	n/a	0	n/a
Spanish Socialist Workers' Party (PSOE)	2,570	13.64	n/a	0	n/a
People's Alliance (AP)	715	3.80	n/a	0	n/a
Blank ballots	143	0.76	n/a		
Total	18,839			1	n/a
Valid votes	18,839	98.29	n/a		
Invalid votes	328	1.71	n/a		
Votes cast / turnout	19,167	75.56	n/a		
Abstentions	6,198	24.44	n/a		
Registered voters	25,365				

== Bibliography ==
- Ley 1/1977, de 4 de enero, para la Reforma Política (Fundamental Law 1/1977). Official State Gazette (in Spanish). 4 January 1977. BOE-A-1977-165.
- Real Decreto-ley 20/1977, de 18 de marzo, sobre Normas Electorales (Royal Decree-Law 20/1977). Official State Gazette (in Spanish). 18 March 1977. BOE-A-1977-7445.
- Constitución Española (Constitution). Official State Gazette (in Spanish). 27 December 1978. BOE-A-1978-31229.
- Ley Orgánica 5/1985, de 19 de junio, del Régimen Electoral General (Organic Law 5/1985). Official State Gazette (in Spanish). 19 June 1985. BOE-A-1985-11672.
- Carreras de Odriozola, Albert; Tafunell Sambola, Xavier (2005) [1989]. Estadísticas históricas de España, siglos XIX-XX (PDF) (in Spanish). Vol. 1 (II ed.). Bilbao: Fundación BBVA. pp. 1072–1097. ISBN 84-96515-00-1. Archived from the original (PDF) on 24 September 2015.
