= PCU =

PCU can refer to:

== Education ==
- Pacific Coast University, a law school in Long Beach, California
- Pai Chai University in Daejeon, South Korea
- Philippine Christian University in Manila, Philippines
- Petra Christian University in Surabaya, Indonesia

== Finance ==
- PCU, a former NYSE ticker symbol for Southern Copper Corporation
- Patelco Credit Union, a credit union in California

== Politics ==
- Partido Comunista de Unificación, the Communist Unification Party in Spain
- Partido Comunista del Uruguay, the Communist Party of Uruguay

== Technology ==
- PCU, the IATA airport code for Poplarville-Pearl River County Airport
- Packet Control Unit, part of the Base Station Subsystem in a GSM network
- Passenger Car Unit, a metric used in transportation engineering
- Photo conductor unit, the fuser drum unit used in laser printers
- Peak concurrent users, a software metric of active users

== Other ==
- PCU (film), a 1994 film lampooning political correctness on college campuses, set at the fictitious Port Chester University
- Portage Credit Union Centre, an ice hockey and recreational complex in Portage la Prairie, Manitoba
- Pre-Commissioning Unit, a description used for United States Navy vessels prior to commission and the personnel units assigned to them
- Progressive care unit, an intermediate coronary care unit
