= Onésimo Díaz Hernández =

Spanish historian

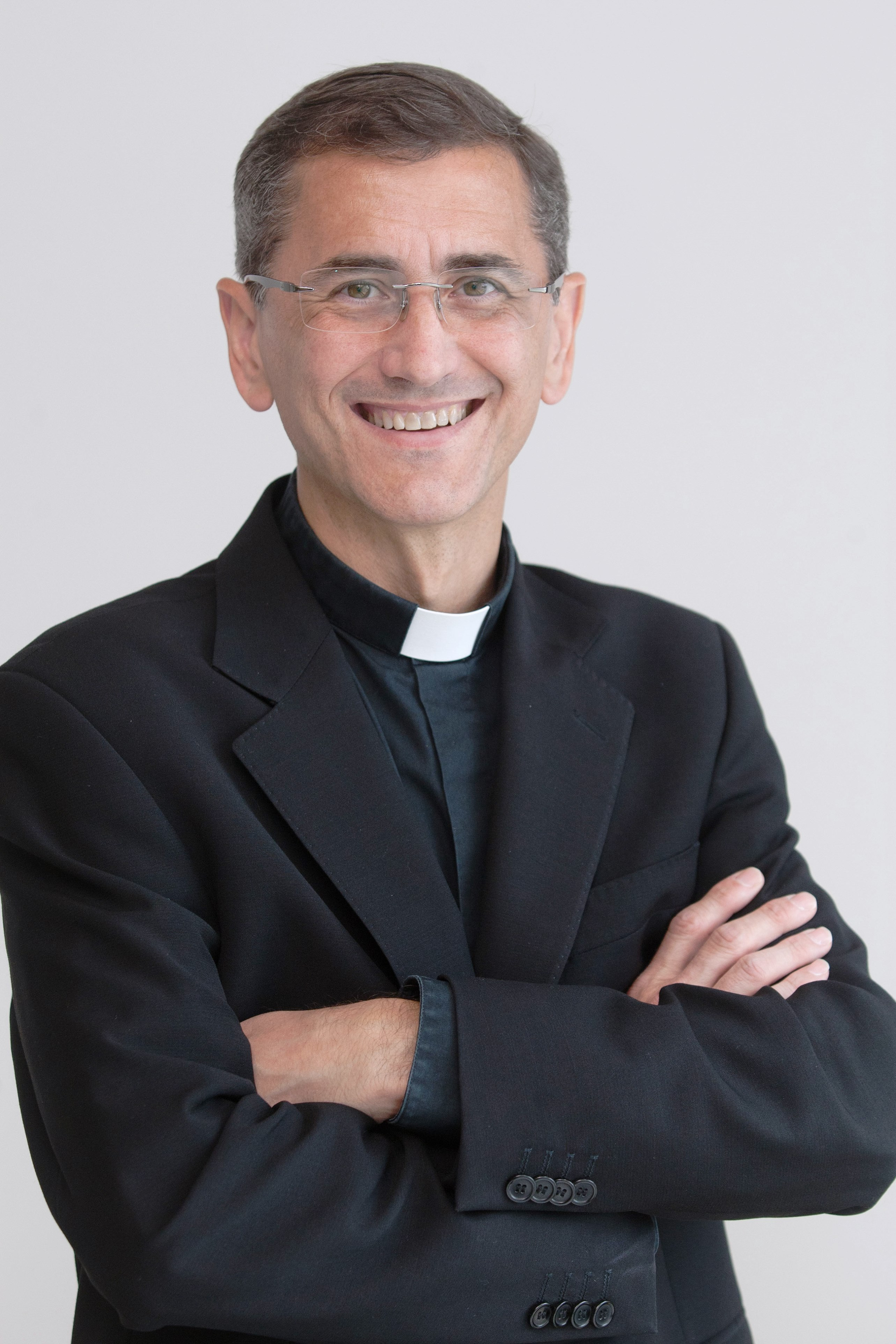
- Born: 16 August 1966 (age 60); Madrid, Spain
- Education: Complutense University of Madrid; University of Navarra; University of the Basque Country
- Occupation: Historian
- Known for: History of Spain under Francisco Franco

Onésimo Díaz Hernández (born 16 August 1966) is a Spanish historian known for his publications regarding the history of Spain in the twentieth century.

== Career ==
Díaz studied history at the Complutense University in Madrid, the University of Navarra (Pamplona), and the University of the Basque Country (Vitoria-Gasteiz) and holds a Ph.D. in History from the University of Basque Country (1995) as well as a Ph.D. in Church History from the Pontifical University of the Holy Cross in Rome (2013).

He is the author of thirteen books and has written multiple book reviews for journals including Arbor, the International Journal of Iberian Studies, and Hispania Sacra. He has published a book in the collection of monographs of the St. Josemaria Escriva Historical institute. It is entitled: "Posguera. La primera expansion del Opus Dei durante los anos 1939 y 1940".

Díaz has been a contributor to newspapers such as ABC, El Mundo, Expansión, El Correo, Diario de Navarra as well as magazines like "Nuestro Tiempo" and Palabra. On spanish television Antena 3 he presents a cultural television program called "Boom".

Díaz presented an article at the Conference of Association for Contemporary Iberian Studies, holds Association for Contemporary Iberian Studies, in Limerick at the University of Limerick, (Ireland, September 2004) on «Urquijo´s brother and the spanish modernization in the interwar period».

Diaz presented an academic paper on «Falange versus Opus Dei» at the II International Conference of Fascism in Granada at University of Granada (April, 2015). The study was cited in the book Francisco Morente Valero, "The Falange and the Academia: Falangist Intellectuals and the Idea of a National-Syndicalist University (1933-1943)".

Díaz is a professor of Contemporary Spanish History and a member of Centro de Documentación y Estudios Jose Maria Escrivá de Balaguer at the University of Navarra.

== Works ==
- En los orígenes de la autonomía vasca. La situación política y administrativa de la Diputación de Alava (1875-1900), Bilbao, Instituto Vasco de Administración Pública, 1995.
- Los Marqueses de Urquijo. El apogeo de una saga poderosa y los inicios del Banco Urquijo, 1870-1931, Pamplona, Eunsa, 1998.
- Josemaría Escrivá de Balaguer y los inicios de la Universidad de Navarra (1952-1960), Pamplona, Eunsa, 2002 (written in collaboration with Federico Requena).
- Rafael Calvo Serer y el grupo “Arbor”, Valencia, Publicaciones Universidad de Valencia (PUV), 2008.
- Historia de Europa en el siglo XX a través de grandes biografías, novelas y películas, Pamplona, Eunsa, 2008.
- Rafael Calvo Serer. La búsqueda de la libertad (1954-1988), Madrid, Rialp, 2010 (with Fernando de Meer).
- Historia de España en el siglo XX a través de las grandes biografías, novelas y películas, Barcelona, Base, 2010.
- Historia del mundo en el siglo XX a través de las grandes biografías, novelas y películas, Barcelona, Base, 2014.
- La revista Arbor (1944-2014): estudio y antología de una publicación del Consejo Superior de Investigaciones Científicas, CSIC, Madrid, 2015.
- En la lucha por la autonomía vasca. La situación política y económico-administrativa de la Diputación de Álava (1900-1923), Instituto Vasco de Administración Pública, Oñati, 2016.
- Historia de los Papas en el siglo XX a través de biografías, novelas y películas, Base, Barcelona, 2017.
- Posguerra. La primera expansión del Opus Dei durante los años 1939 y 1940, Rialp, Madrid, 2018.
- Mujeres protagonistas del siglo XX a través de sus biografías, novelas y películas, Base, Barcelona, 2019.

== Recognition ==
Díaz received the “Premio Leizaola" Award in 1994 for "En los orígenes de la autonomía vasca", and in 1997 he received the “Premio Laudio-Llodio” Award for Los primeros Marqueses de Urquijo y Llodio.
