= Unification Party =

Unification Party may refer to:

- Communist Unification Party, a political party in Spain
- Democratic Unification Party, a political party in Honduras
- Liberia Unification Party, a political party in Liberia
- Party of Communist Unification in the Canaries, a communist political party working for the political autonomy of the Canary Islands
- Revolutionary Party of Democratic Unification, a political party in El Salvador founded in 1957
- Workers' Party of Marxist Unification, a Spanish communist political party formed during the Second Republic
