= Strike pay =

Payment by a trade union to workers on strike

Strike pay is a payment made by a trade union to workers who are on strike to help in meeting their basic needs while on strike, often out of a special reserve known as a strike fund. Union workers reason that the availability of strike pay increases their leverage at the bargaining table and actually decreases the probability of a strike, since the employers are aware that their employees have this financial resource available to them if they choose to strike. When workers strike, they can also subsist using pre-strike income and savings.

It has also been used in Australian law to mean payments by employers to compensate lost earnings by employees during industrial action. Strike pay, under the usual meaning above, "is relatively uncommon in both Australia and New Zealand" according to Velden et al.

== By countries ==
=== Spain ===
The main unions providing a strike fund in Spain are Unión Sindical Obrera (USO, "Workers' Trade Union") and the Basque Basque Workers' Solidarity (ELA-STV).

==== Workers' Trade Union ====
USO claims it has paid workers over 7 million euros in 4 000 actions. The union pays strikers between 75% and 100% of the Spanish minimum wage depending on their seniority in the union.

==== Basque Country and Navarre ====
According to ELA, its fund received 13.7 million euros between 2008 and 2011, 15.1% of its expenses, and 19.1 M€ between 2012 and 2016 (16,24%). It receives amounts to 25% of the dues of its members.

ELA-STV strikers can receive between €1,000/month (the minimum wage in Spain) and €1,243. Another Basque union LAB provides a maximum of €30/day (€900/month) after the second day of the strike.

Strikes funded by ELA-STV can become long: 235 days at Tubacex, 285 among the cleaners of the Guggenheim Bilbao Museum, over 1,000 days at Novaltia.

=== United Kingdom ===
Whilst some trade unions make payments to members who are on an official strike there is no requirement to do so. The UK Government makes the presumption that workers on official strike action are being paid strike pay, and so they may not be entitled to state benefits. Strike pay is not taxable income in the United Kingdom.

Limited strike funds were a constraining factor on strike pay before the 1970s.

=== Canada ===
In Canada, strike pay is not taxable income. This was confirmed in the 1990 Supreme Court of Canada case Fries v. The Queen. According to Velden et al. "in order to qualify for [strike pay], some kind of strike work, such as picketing" is usually necessary.

=== United States ===
Local unions often maintain strike funds to help striking workers (e.g., in Teamsters Local No. 455, the amount is determined based on workers' monthly dues). In the United States, courts usually hold that strike pay is taxable income. In some cases, it has been considered a gift, and thus not taxable income.

=== Denmark ===
In Denmark "most unions provide strike pay at the comparatively high level of up to 80% of real wages," according to Velden et al. As part of collective bargaining agreements in Denmark, unions cannot provide strike pay where industrial action relates to matters already addressed in their agreement(s).

=== Germany ===
According to Velden et al., strike pay is "paid to members involved in official strikes or locked out by employers" in Germany. In some instances, non-union members can receive strike pay from trade union strike funds.

=== China ===
In 1982, the right of workers to strike was removed from the Constitution of China. Therefore, Chinese workers are not entitled to strike pay under federal law.

=== Sweden ===
Sweden has a high trade union density, much like other Nordic countries and strike pay may be paid out by trade unions, such as the Engineers of Sweden, but is not considered taxable.

=== Argentina ===
In Argentina, workers hold the legal right to strike and receive payment. However, employers do not always honor this right.

=== Luxembourg ===
In Luxembourg, strike days are not compensated by employers. However, trade unions can compensate members through a fund financed by member dues.

== Strike fund ==
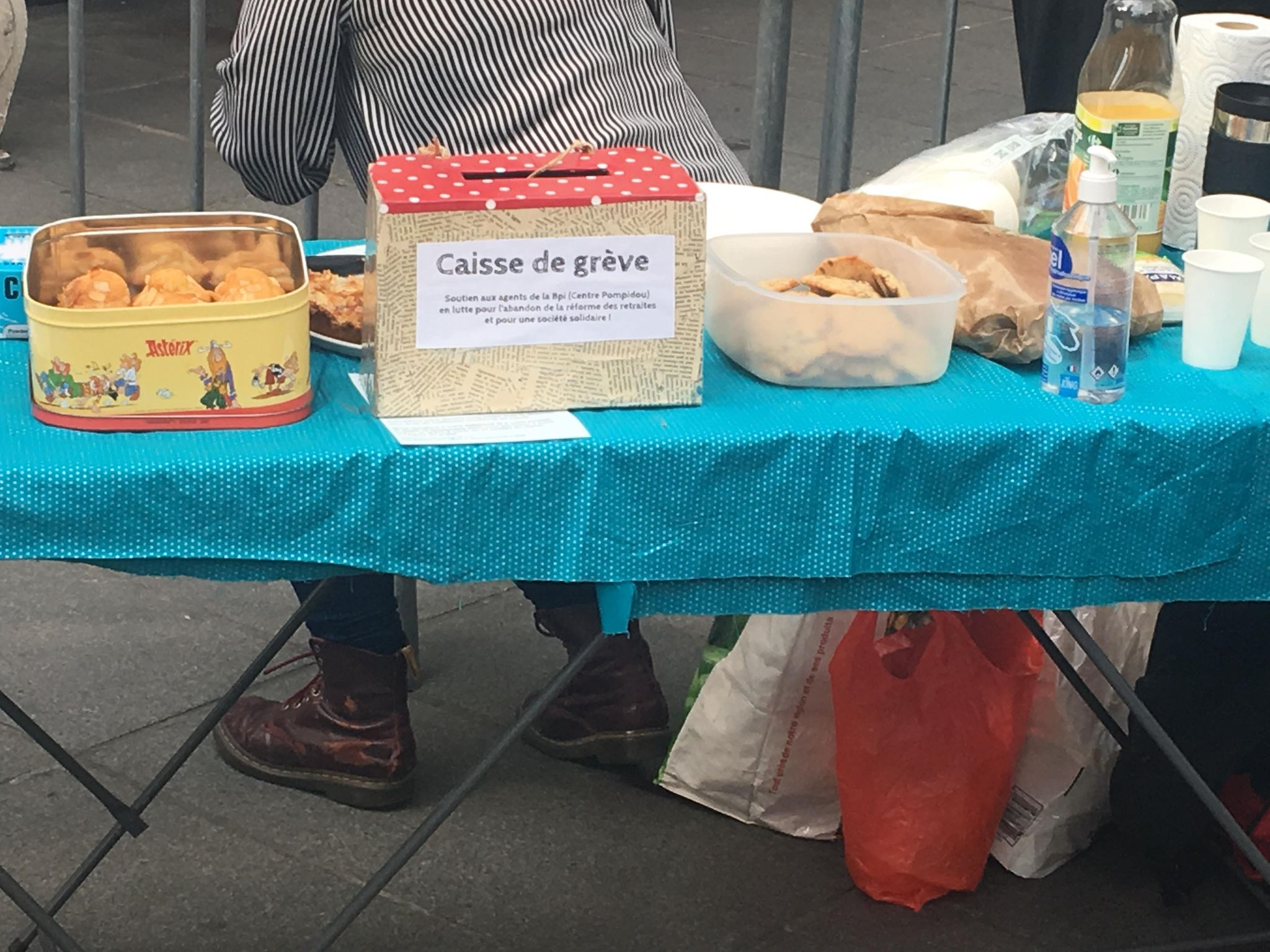
A donation box for the strike of Bibliothèque publique d'information in 2020.

A strike fund is a reserve set up by a union ahead of time (through special assessments or from general funds) and used to provide strike pay or for other strike-related activities.

Strike funds have also been called "fighting funds" and in Danish "strejkekasse". According to Velden et al., in Belgium "unions sometimes reach an agreement with the employer to pay the wages retrospectively so that the union strike fund remains unaffected".
