= Jesús María Pedrosa Urquiza =

Spanish politician

Jesús María Pedrosa Urquiza (Ordizia, 1942-Durango, 2000) was a Spanish politician who was a victim of terrorism of ETA.

== Biography ==
Jesús María Pedrosa Urquiza was killed by ETA in Durango on June 4, 2000. He was born in Ordizia, but he lived in Durango since childhood. He was a councilman of People's party in Durango City Hall since 1987. He was also affiliated with ELA Labour Union. He worked in several companies in the industrial sector. He was married and had two daughters. At the time of his murder, he was 57 years old.

=== Murder ===
Jesus Maria returned to his home after attending church. As he walked the streets of Durango's downtown an uncovered face terrorist approached him from behind and made a unique shot in the nape of the neck, the victim died almost instantaneously. The judge on duty ordered the lifting of the corpse past the 16:00 hours. Two days after his murder was summoned a massive protest against the attack on the cry of "freedom".

There is no conviction whatsoever for this attack. According to the Ministry of Peace of the Basque Government, the procedural situation of the offence is a file. ETA claimed on June 11, 2000, the authorship of this assassination, along with the murder of José Luis López de Lacalle through a text sent to the newspapers Gara and Egunkaria. Due to the absence of any sentence for this attack, there is not a conviction for this murder. However, after the death the group's members Urko Gerrikagoitia Agirre, Zigor Arambarri Garamendi, Ekain Ruiz Ibarguren and Patxi Rementeria Barruetabeña while they were moving a bomb in Bilbao. The investigations point out that this attack was carried out by the Vizcaya command, and not the Araba command, which the attack had been previously attributed to.

== Bibliography ==
- MERINO, A., CHAPA, A., Raíces de Libertad. pp. 177–189. FPEV (2011). ISBN 978-84-615-0648-4 (in spanish)
