= Maoist Youth Union =

Communist youth organization in Spain

Maoist Youth Union Unión de Juventudes Maoistas
- UJM symbol
- Secretary General: Faustino Bosquet
- Founded: November 29, 1975
- Headquarters: C/ Caños del Peral, Madrid
- Ideology: Marxism–Leninism-Mao Zedong Thought
- Mother party: Workers Revolutionary Organization (ORT)
- Magazine: Forja Comunista, El Joven Maoista

The Maoist Youth Union (Spanish: Unión de Juventudes Maoístas, abbreviated UJM) was a youth organization in Spain during the transition to democracy. It was founded as the youth wing of the Workers Revolutionary Organization (ORT) in 1975.

The organization upheld Marxism–Leninism-Mao Zedong Thought. In March 1975 ORT issued a statement labelled 'A call to the revolutionary youth'. UJM was founded at a conference on November 29, 1975. Faustino Bosquet Villaescusa was elected general secretary of UJM in July 1976. In the same month, UJM took part in founding the Democratic Platform of Political Youth Forces (along with the Socialist Youth, Communist Youth Union of Spain and the Young Red Guard).

On February 22, 1977 UJM appealed to the government for its legalization. The appeal was presented by Pedro Izquierdo and Fernando Casanova. UJM demanded that a 'Youth Charter' be included in the new Spanish constitution.

UJM began publishing the bulletin Forja Comunista ('Communist Forge') in January 1976. It began publishing the journal El Joven Maoista ('The Young Maoist') in 1977.

UJM held its first congress at the Estadio de Vallehermoso in Madrid on January 7–8, 1978. The congress elected a Central Committee and re-elected Faustino Bosquet as general secretary. The congress rejected the Moncloa Pact, urged support for the Sindicato Unitario trade union movement and declared its non-participation in the World Festival of Youth and Students in Havana. In one of its statements, it declared that North American imperialism and Russian social imperialism were "sworn enemies of the sovereignty and liberty of the peoples", threatening the peoples of the world with the risk of a new world war.

In February 1978 UJM co-signed an appeal against the law decree issued by the government on youth associations. Other signatories included the Socialist Youth, Communist Youth Union of Spain and Nuevas Generaciones. UJM campaigned for a "Yes" vote in the 1978 constitutional referendum. In the spring of 1979 the UJM office in Madrid was targeted twice in Molotov cocktail attacks.

UJM held its second congress in April 1980. The organization later disappeared.

== Bibliography ==
Notes

References

- Auñamendi, Anonymus AC05068612 (1998). Enciclopedia general ilustrada del País Vasco: Diccionario enciclopédico vasco (in Spanish) (1998 ed.). Auñamendi. ISBN 9788470252631. - Total pages: 559
- Brugos Salas, Valentín (2012). "Los diferentes intentos de construcción de un proyecto alternativo al PCE" (PDF). fan-asturies.org. Archived from the original (PDF) on December 11, 2013.
- El País (July 23, 1976). "La Plataforma Democrática de Fuerzas Políticas Juveniles". El País.
- El País (February 23, 1977). "Cinco nuevos partidos solicitan su inscripción". El País.
- El País (August 1977). "Joven Guardia Roja: "Levantaremos una bandera de moral comunista"". El País.
- El País (February 4, 1978). "Piden la derogación del decreto sobre asociacionismo juvenil". El País.
- El País (January 7, 1978). "Hoy se inicia en Madrid el I Congreso de la Unión de Juventudes Maoístas". El País.
- El País (January 10, 1978). "Ruptura entre las Juventudes Maoístas y las demás fuerzas políticas juveniles". El País.
- El País (November 2, 1978). "Mañana se aprobará la convocatoria del referéndum sobre la Constitución". El País.
- El País (June 22, 1979). "Atentado contra el local de las Juventudes Maoístas". El País.
- Iglesias, Fundación Pablo (1984). Catálogo de publicaciones periódicas (in Spanish) (1984 ed.). P. Iglesias. ISBN 9788485691166. - Total pages: 409
- Moreno Sáez, Francisco (2012). "PARTIDOS, SINDICATOS Y ORGANIZACIONES CIUDADANAS EN LA PROVINCIA DE ALICANTE DURANTE LA TRANSICIÓN (1974-1982)" (PDF). Moreno Sáez. Archived from the original (PDF) on June 20, 2012.
- Paradela, José de Cora (1977). Panfletos y prensa antifranquista clandestina (in Spanish) (1977 ed.). Ediciones 99. ISBN 9788471160478. - Total pages: 159
- Unión de Juventudes Maoistas (2012). "Proyecto de Programa de la Unión de Juventudes Maoistas". Unión de Juventudes Maoistas.
- Unión de Juventudes Maoistas (1978). Resoluciones... Aprobadas por el primer Congreso (in Spanish) (January 1978 ed.). Edita Comite Central UJM - 10 PTAS. - Total pages: 15
- Unión de Juventudes Maoístas. Congreso (2n : 1980) (1980). Una Organización comunista para la juventud : materiales II Congreso, 3-4-5-6 abril 1980 / UJM (in Spanish) (1980 ed.). [Sl: sn].
