= Wassenaar Agreement =

1982 Dutch policy consensus between employees and employers

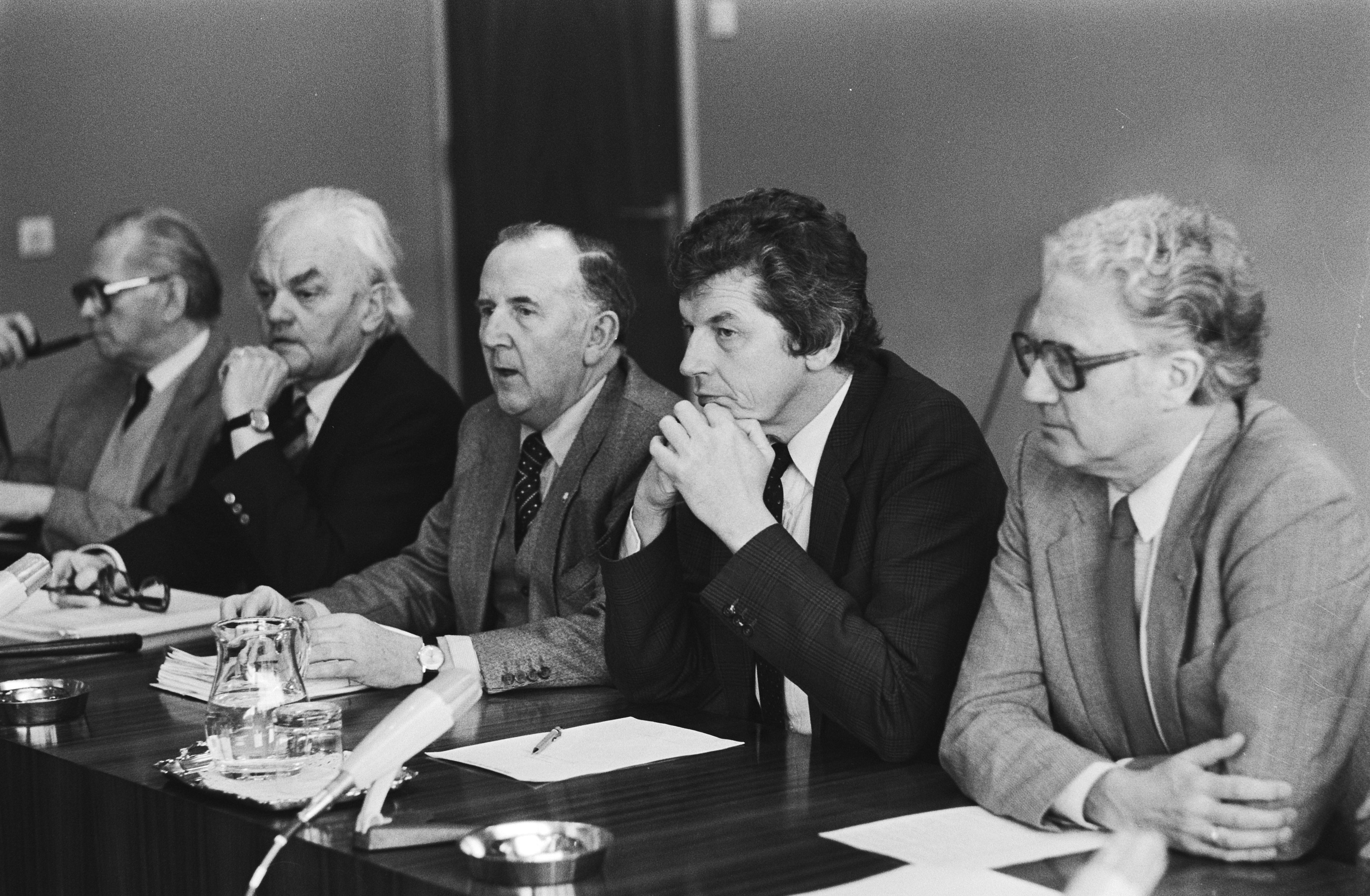
Steef van Eijkelenburg (NCW), Chris van Veen (VNO), Wim Kok (FNV) and Harm van der Meulen (CNV) signing the agreement on 24 November 1982.

The Wassenaar Agreement was an agreement reached in 1982 between employers' organisations and labour unions in the Netherlands to restrain wage growth in return for the adoption of policies to combat unemployment and inflation, such as reductions in working hours and the expansion of part-time employment. The agreement has been credited with ending the wage-price spiral of the 1970s, greatly reducing unemployment and producing strong growth in output and employment. The International Labour Organization describes the Wassenaar as "a groundbreaking agreement, setting the tone for later social pacts in many European countries".

== See also ==
- Moncloa Pacts
