= JGRE =

JGRE is an abbreviation of:

- Journal of Geophysical Research E: Planets, a scientific journal in planetary science
- Joven Guardia Roja de España, the Young Red Guard of Spain, a communist youth organisation which operated from 1973 to 1980
