= Eusko Langillen Alkartasuna (Askatuta) – Solidaridad de Trabajadores Vascos (Independiente) =

ELA-STV (Askatuta)
- Eusko Langileen Alkartasuna (Askatuta) - Solidaridad de Trabajadores Vascos (Independiente)
- Founded: 1976
- Dissolved: 1990
- Key people: Josu Bilbao, general secretary

Eusko Langileen Alkartasuna (Askatuta) – Solidaridad de Trabajadores Vascos (Independiente) ('Basque Workers' Solidarity (Independent)', abbreviated ELA-STV (a)) was a trade union centre in the Basque Country, formed in 1976 after a split in ELA-STV (Basque Workers' Solidarity). It rejoined ELA-STV in 1990.

== Formation ==
ELA-STV, a craft union movement primarily based in the Basque mountain areas, divided between a pro-capitalist grouping and a more militant grouping. The pro-capitalist faction formed ELA-STV (a), which favoured cooperation with employers. Whilst the majority ELA-STV was holding its congress in two sessions in Amorebieta-Etxano (August 1976) and Eibar (October 1976), ELA-STV (a) was founded at a parallel congress in Lejona (thus the nickname 'Eladios de Lejona').

The split evolved around the question of the relationship between ELA-STV and the Basque Nationalist Party. The majority of ELA-STV was moving in a more independent and progressive direction, whilst ELA-STV (a) sought to reaffirm its political ties to the party. The split was bitter, with the ELA-STV accusing the ELA-STV (a) of being financially supported by wealthy capitalists, Francoists and Opus Dei. ELA-STV (a) rejected these accusations.

== History ==
Josu Bilbao was the general secretary of the newly formed ELA-STV (a). ELA-STV (a) published a monthly journal, Lan Deya. The union was supported by the Basque Nationalist Party. The other unions regarded it with hostility, since business leaders could point to the ELA-STV (a) to undermine their claims to be the true representatives of the workers. ELA-STV (a) failed to make any major headway in the 1978 trade union elections, winning only 3% of the positions. It won 309 delegate seats in total.

In June 1990 ELA-STV (a) held an extraordinary congress, which voted in favour of reunification with ELA-STV. ELA-STV (a) merged back into ELA-STV in the same year. The merger agreement was signed on July 12, 1990. At the time of the merger ELA-STV (a) had around 300 company committee delegates and some presence in heavy industries in Bizkaia.
