= Confederación de Sindicatos Unitarios de Trabajadores =

Trade union centre in Spain

CSUT
- Confederación de Sindicatos Unitarios de Trabajadores
- Founded: 1977
- Headquarters: Farmacia 3, 1º izq., Madrid
- Location: Spain
- Members: 450,000 (1978)
- Key people: Jerónimo Lorente, general secretary

Confederación de Sindicatos Unitarios de Trabajadores (Confederation of Workers Unitarian Trade Unions, abbreviated CSUT) was a trade union centre in Spain.

== Origins ==
The organization emerged from a split away from Comisiones Obreras (CC.OO.) trade union movement in 1976. The Party of Labour of Spain (PTE), which was the driving force behind the launching of CSUT, was part of the 'Minority Tendency' inside CC.OO. A meeting was held on November 7, 1976 in Coslada at which opponents to the CC.OO. leadership gathered. The CC.OO. dissidents opposed the dominance of the Communist Party of Spain (PCE) in CC.OO. However, the dissident unionists gathered in Coslada were split in two. One group went on to form Sindicato Unitario. The other, led by Jerónimo Lorente, formed CSUT at an assembly in Vallecas in March 1977. Lorente became president and Antonio Castillo confederal secretary of CSUT. In May 1977, the National Confederation of Catalonia was founded at a legal congress in Barcelona, with around 1,000 participants.

== 1978 elections ==
CSUT called for 'organic' unity of the labour movement, criticizing the reformist trade unions and their links to political parties. CSUT itself, however, was closely linked to the PTE. Only one out of ten CSUT secretariat members was not a PTE member. In January 1978 Daniel Cando replaced Juan Domingo Linde as general secretary of CSUT in Catalonia, following Domingo Linde's expulsion from PTE a few months earlier. Diamián Rodríguez was the general secretary of CSUT in Madrid.

In the 1978 trade union elections CSUT raised the slogan "La CSUT, el sindicato que habla claro, da soluciones a los problemas y jamás se vende" ('CSUT, the trade union that speaks out, gives solution to the problems and never sells out'). The organization kicked off its campaign on January 20, 1978 with a public meeting at Colegio La Paloma in Madrid, with some 2,000 participants. At the event, Lorente stated that CSUT was far ahead of all other contenders for the third place in the polls. In the midst of the elections CSUT called for a strike in Correos (Post), a move criticized by the management and other unions as an electoral stunt.

CSUT won 4,984 delegate seats across Spain (4% of the seats elected).

CSUT held its first congress in February 1978, with around 1,200 delegates. At the time, CSUT claimed a membership of 450,000 workers. CSUT published El Unitario. Prior to the congress CSUT suspended its conference in the Basque Country three times, as a result of heavy rains preventing delegates from Navarre from participating. Instead the provincial organizations were ordered to elect their congress delegates directly.

The first congress for the CSUT organization in the Valencian Country, with some 200 participants, was held in June 1978. The congress unanimously ratified Vicente Alcover as their general secretary. In the same month, El País reported that some five hundred workers had left CSUT at the factories of ITT-Standard and Faessa Internacional in Barcelona, in protest of the domination of CSUT by PTE. Most of the dissidents were said to have joined CC.OO.

CSUT advocated workers self-government of enterprises in the long-term perspective. CSUT was able to make some headway in rural Andalusia and Extremadura, where it engaged in social agrarian conflicts and organized symbolic land occupations. The agrarian workers' union of CSUT was the Sindicato de Obreros del Campo, led by Gonzalo Sánchez Fernández. The union held its founding congress in Seville in September 1977. CSUT also had a significant presence in the construction sector and in Correos.

In December 1978 CSUT and Confederación Nacional del Trabajo agreed to hold a joint nationwide campaign against the Social Pact.

As PTE moved ahead towards a merger with the Workers Revolutionary Organization (ORT), CSUT and SU (the ORT labour wing) entered into a unification process. The process however did not proceed smoothly, as there were differences regarding the organizational structure and the national question.

The second congress of CSUT convened on January 31, 1980. By this time CSUT was severely weakened.

CSUT was included in the Spanish delegation at the 66th conference of the International Labour Organization (1980), in spite of protests from UGT and CC.OO. Alfonso Rodríguez Casillas was the CSUT representative in the delegation.
