= Basque Workers' Solidarity =

Trade union in Spain

ELA
- Basque Workers' Solidarity
- Eusko Langileen Alkartasuna
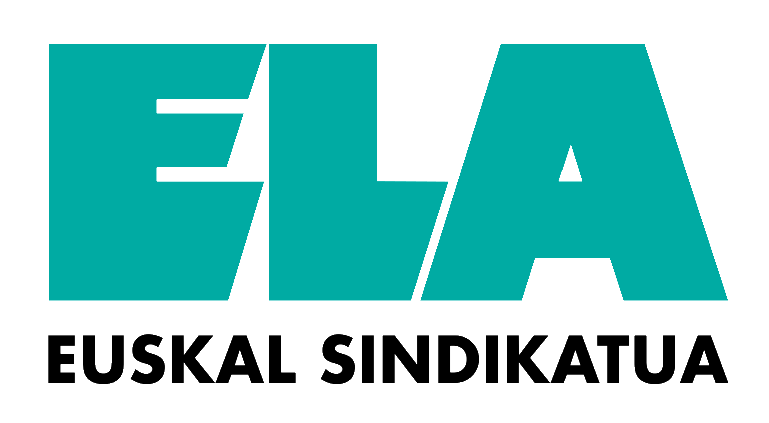
- Founded: 1911
- Headquarters: Bilbao
- Location: Spain
- Members: Members: 105,312; Labor delegates/representatives: 7,049 (40.44%) in the Basque Autonomous Community and 1,359 (22.74%) in Navarre.
- Key people: José Miguel Leunda Etxeberria, president José Elorrieta Aurrekoetxea, secretary general
- Affiliations: ITUC, ETUC
- Website: https://www.ela.eus/en

Basque Workers' Solidarity (in Basque: Eusko Langileen Alkartasuna (ELA), in Spanish: Solidaridad de Trabajadores Vascos (STV)) is the most influential trade union in the Basque Country, having been created, as Solidaridad de Obreros Vascos, by members of the Basque Nationalist Party on June 10, 1911, in Bilbao.

== History ==
ELA-STV publication from 1971

It was opposed to the influence of trade unions who appealed to a working class ethos (Socialist UGT and Anarchist CNT), advocating instead a Basque nationalist outlook. Initially, ELA-STV was centered on projects of mutual assistance between its affiliates, as a vehicle for social security. It expanded with much more success in Gipuzkoa and Biscay than in Navarre and Álava.

ELA-STV was caught in the fighting of the Spanish Civil War, and banned by the Francoist State. It reemerged in 1976, during the transition to democracy. Today, it has over 105,000 members.

In the 70's ELA abandoned its original social-christian ideology in favour of more socialist positions, recognizing the importance and validity of the class struggle, breaking with the Basque Nationalist Party (EAJ/PNV) and approaching LAB, a union within the abertzale left.

In the General Congress of 1976 ELA-STV approved the new principles and rules of the union, which will become its identity: ELA was a Basque national and class union, independent from all political parties, open to all workers of Euskal Herria, with economic independence (funding only through membership fees, and not accepting public money), incompatibility of positions, confederal basis, creating a common strike fund, international solidarity, etc. This line will be ratified and will gain further in the coming Congress. During the transition, ELA opposed the Moncloa Pacts. The pro-PNV and anti-socialist wing of the union split and formed Eusko Langillen Alkartasuna (Askatuta) – Solidaridad de Trabajadores Vascos (Independiente) (ELA (a)-STV (i)), which would disappear in 1990.

== Strike fund ==
ELA's strike fund is unusual in Spanish unionism. Only USO among the main Spanish unions provides one. According to ELA, the fund received 13.7 million euros between 2008 and 2011, 15.1% of its expenses, and 19.1 M€ between 2012 and 2016 (16,24%).
