= Harm van der Meulen =

Dutch trade unionist and politician

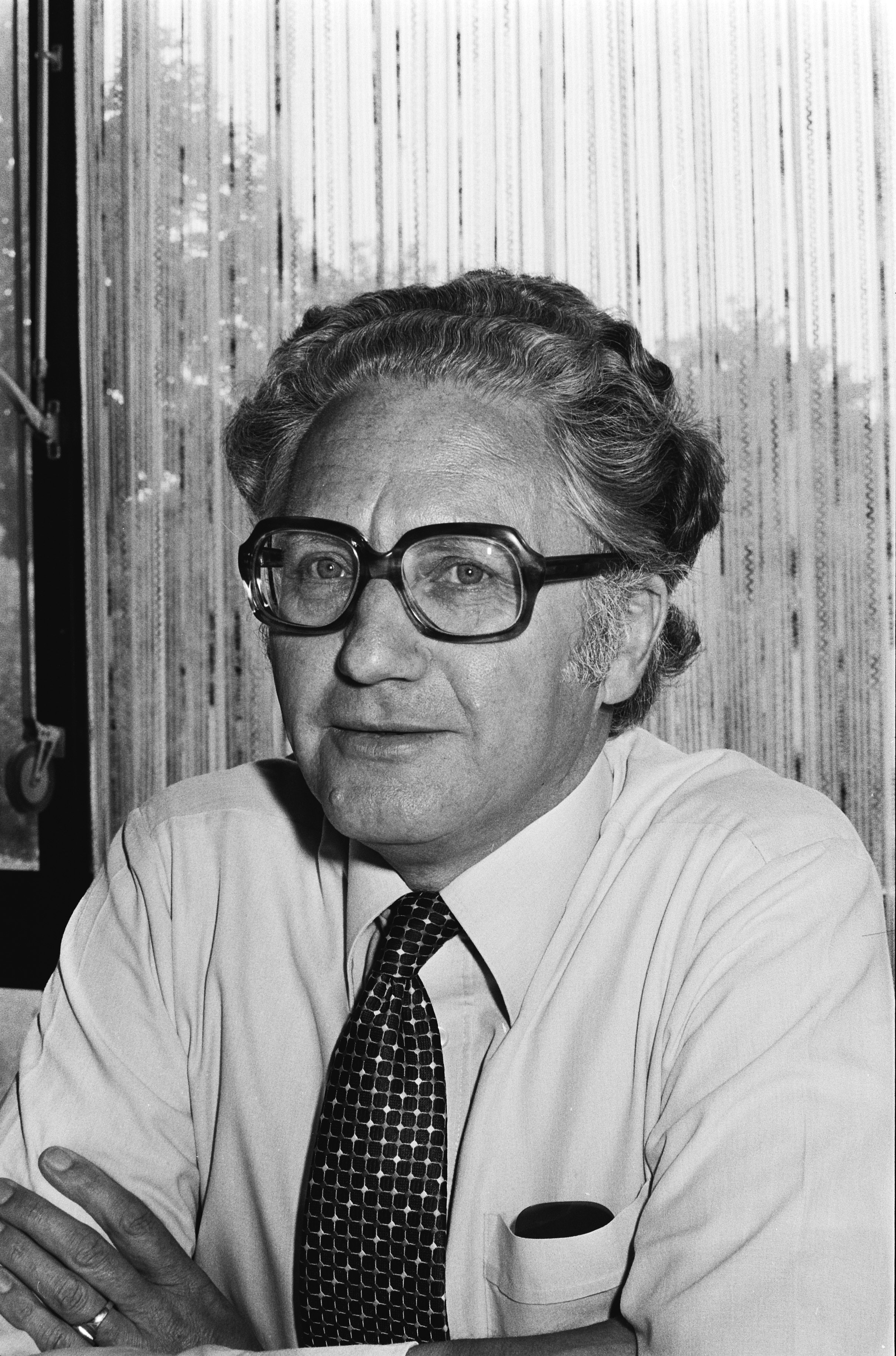
Harm van der Meulen, 1979

Harm van der Meulen (21 October 1925, Castricum - 15 December 2009, Utrecht) was a Dutch trade unionist and politician.
