= LAB (Basque union) =

- Nationalist/Patriotic Workers' Committees
- Langile Abertzaleen Batzordeak
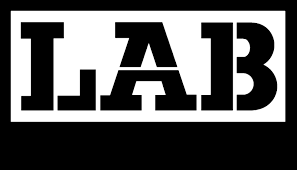
- Founded: 1974
- Headquarters: Bilbao
- Location: Basque Country
- Members: 50,000
- Key people: Garbiñe Aranburu, general secretary
- Affiliations: World Federation of Trade Unions
- Website: lab.eus

Langile Abertzaleen Batzordeak (LAB, Basque for "Nationalist Workers' Committees") is a Basque left-wing nationalist and Pro-independence trade union operating in the Basque Country, both in the French and Spanish sides, currently led by Garbiñe Aranburu.

It was created in 1974 by Jon Idigoras among others. They are part of the Basque National Liberation Movement, an aggregation of leftist Basque nationalist forces including the former illegal paramilitary organization Euskadi Ta Askatasuna (ETA) and the banned political parties Batasuna and Segi. It is supported by around 50.000 affiliates.

The union is legal and it is one of the four major organisations of its kind in the Basque Country. In the last decades it has mostly collaborated with the other Basque nationalist union, ELA, while both have been opposed often by the Spanish-wide trade unions, UGT and CC.OO., that make up their own bloc.

In 2019 it had 19.1% of the labour delegates in the Basque Autonomous Community, being the second biggest union after the also left-wing and abertzale Basque Workers' Solidarity (ELA). In Navarre the union has similar results, with a total of 1054 labour delegates, 16.95% of the total, being the fourth largest union after UGT, ELA and Workers' Commissions.
