= Young Red Guard of Spain =

Young Red Guard of Spain Joven Guardia Roja de España
- Secretary General: Pina López-Gay
- Founded: 1973 (legalized in 1978)
- Preceded by: Juventudes Universitarias Revolucionarias
- Dissolved: 1980
- Ideology: Marxism Leninism; Mao Zedong Thought; Federalism; Republicanism; Antifascism; Feminism
- Mother party: Party of Labour of Spain (PTE)
- State affiliation: Spain
- Magazine: La Voz de la JGRE

The Young Red Guard of Spain (Spanish: Joven Guardia Roja de España, abbreviated JGRE) was a youth organization in Spain during the transition to democracy and the "Late Francoism" period. It was founded as the youth wing of the Party of Labour of Spain (PTE) in 1973.

== History ==
The JGRE was the continuation of the Universitarian Revolutionary Youth.
