= Green and Red Canaries =

Green and Red Canaries Canarias Verde y Roja
- Founded: 2011
- Dissolved: 2011
- Political position: Left-wing

Green and Red Canaries (Spanish: Canarias Verde y Roja) was a Gran Canaria-based electoral alliance formed by United Canarian Left, Canaries for the Left–Yes We Can (Spanish: Canarias por la Izquierda–Sí se Puede) and Party for Services and Public Employed ahead of the 2011 general election. It contested the election in the province of Las Palmas.

== Member parties ==
- United Canarian Left (ICU)
- Canaries for the Left–Yes We Can (CxIzq–SSP)
- Party for Services and Public Employed (PSyEP)
