= Communist Unification Party =

Communist Unification Party Partido Comunista de Unificación
- Founded: 1976
- Dissolved: 1977
- Merger of: Lucha de Clases; Larga Marcha hacia la Revolución Socialista; Organización Comunista Información Obrera
- Merged into: Party of Labour of Spain
- Ideology: Marxism-leninism; Maoism; Anti-Revisionism

Communist Unification Party (in Spanish: Partido Comunista de Unificación) was a political party in Spain. Formed in 1976 through the unification of the two groups Lucha de Clases and Larga Marcha hacia la Revolución Socialista. Later the same year the Communist Organization Workers Information Organización Comunista Información Obrera joined the PCU.

PCU promoted abstention in the 1976 Referendum on the Law of Political Reform.

In 1977 merged into the Party of Labour of Spain (PTE).
