= Unión Sindical Obrera =

Spanish trade union

USO
- Unión Sindical Obrera
- Founded: 1961
- Headquarters: Madrid, Spain
- Location: Spain
- Members: 117,148 members. 10,793 union representatives
- Key people: Joaquín Pérez, general secretary
- Affiliations: ETUC, ITUC
- Website: www.uso.es

The Unión Sindical Obrera (USO, "Workers' Trade Union") is a Spanish trade union. Founded as a clandestine organization in 1961—during the dictatorship of Francisco Franco—the union was an outgrowth of Roman Catholic organizations dedicated to Catholic social teaching, particularly on the dignity of work. Influenced by the French Democratic Confederation of Labour (CFDT), which also had Catholic roots but was by that time drifting away from any formal relation to the church, USO declared itself from the outset to be secular and socialist. Like the CFDT, after 1968 USO advocated autogestion (workers' self-management).

After the Spanish transition to democracy, the group split, with one faction uniting to the Unión General de Trabajadores (historically affiliated with the Spanish Socialist Workers' Party or PSOE), another joining the Workers' Commissions (Comisiones Obreras, affiliated with the Communist Party of Spain), and a third continuing as a small, independent trade union.

Unlike the main unions established all over Spain, USO has a strike fund. According to the union, workers have received over 7 million euros in 4 000 actions. It can also cover for missing wages of workers fired as reprisal for their activism. How much the strikers receive depends on their seniority in the union. It can reach between 75% and 200% of Spanish minimum wage.
