= Diario de Navarra =

Spanish regional daily newspaper

- Type: Regional daily newspaper
- Owner(s): Grupo La Información
- Publisher: Grupo La Información
- Founded: 1903; 122 years ago
- Political alignment: Conservatism; Navarrese regionalism; Spanish nationalism
- Language: Spanish
- Headquarters: Pamplona
- Country: Spain
- Circulation: 28,000 (as of 2024)
- ISSN: 1577-6301
- OCLC number: 31791830
- Website: diariodenavarra.es

Diario de Navarra (also called El Diario de Navarra; Spanish: Navarra Daily) is a regional newspaper based in Pamplona, Spain. The paper has been in circulation since 1903.

== History and profile ==
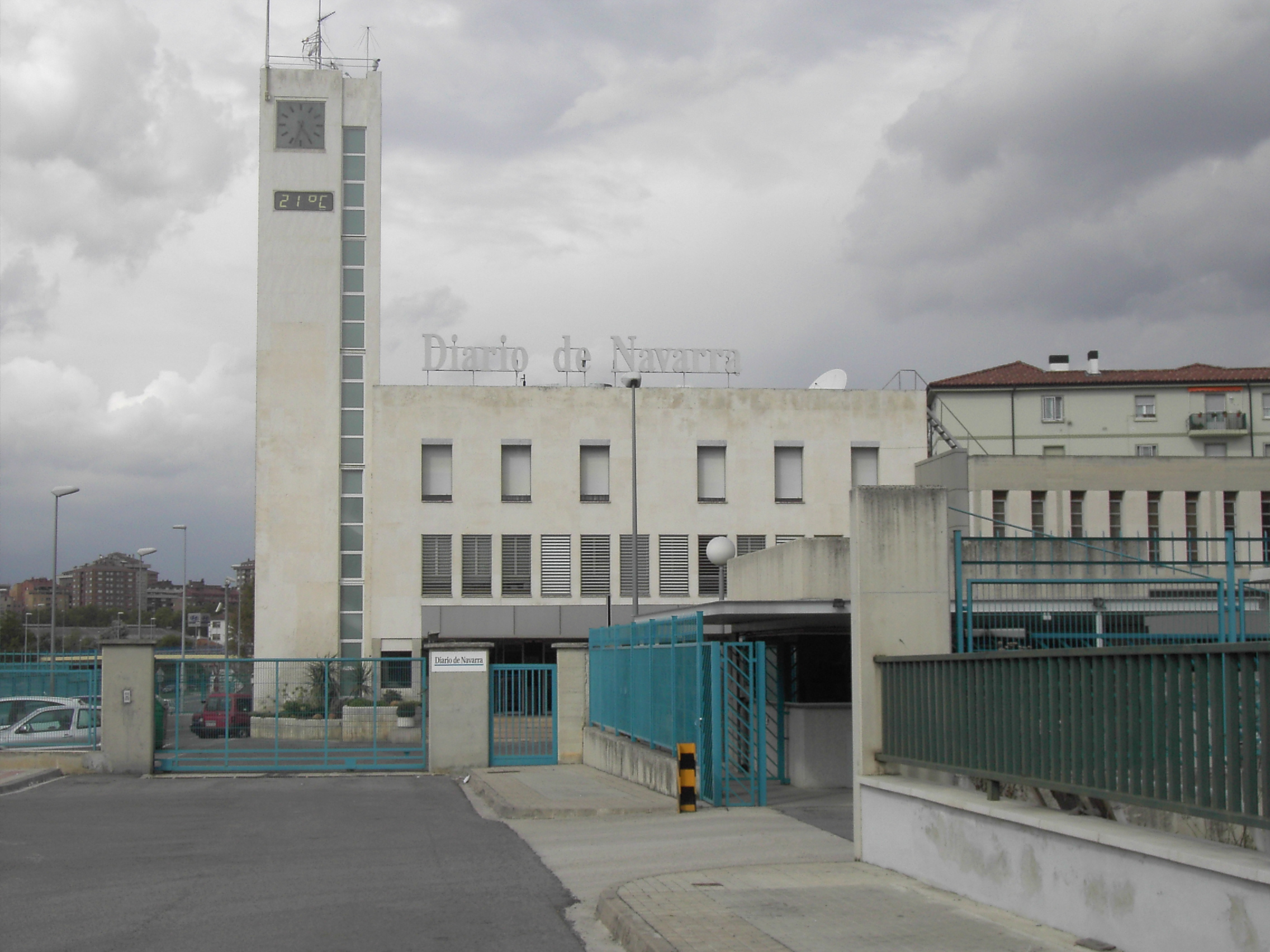
Headquarters of the paper

Diario de Navarra was established by five local families in 1903. The paper has its headquarters in Pamplona. It is part of the company, Grupo La Información, owned by founding families. The publisher is also the same company.

In the late 1970s Diario de Navarra supported the view that the province of Navarre should remain part of Spain and be independent of Euskadi. On 22 August 1979, ETA attempted to assassinate the editor of the paper, José Javier Uranga, allegedly due to this support. On the other hand, the paper has a neutral political stance.

== Circulation ==
Diario de Navarra sold 63,312 copies in 1993. The paper had the highest level of readership in the Navarre province in 2001. It was the 13th best selling newspaper in Spain in 2003. In the period of 2009–2010 the paper sold 49,065 copies. The circulation of the paper was 44,000 copies in 2011.
