= Workers' Revolutionary Organization (Spain) =

Defunct communist party in Spain

Workers' Revolutionary Organisation Organización Revolucionaria de los Trabajadores
- Secretary-General: José Sanroma Aldea camarada Intxausti
- Founded: 1969
- Dissolved: 1980
- Newspaper: En Lucha
- Youth wing: Maoist Youth Union
- Ideology: Communism; Marxism-Leninism; Maoism; Anti-fascism; Federalism
- Political position: Far-left
- Trade union affiliation: Sindicato Unitario (SU)
- Town councillors (1979-1983): 141 / 67,505 (including UNAI)
- Autonomic parliaments (1979-1983): 1 / 1,268

ORT sticker (1977).

ORT sticker supporting the Spanish constitution.

The Workers' Revolutionary Organisation (in Spanish: Organización Revolucionaria de los Trabajadores) was a Maoist communist organisation in Spain. The newspaper of the organization was En Lucha.

== History ==
ORT was founded in 1969, emerging out of the left-wing Catholic Workers' Trade Union Action (Acción Sindical de Trabajadores).

The youth wing of ORT was the Maoist Youth Union (Unión de Juventudes Maoístas) and the trade union wing was the Unitary Trade Union (Sindicato Unitario). ORT published En Lucha.

In the 1977 elections, ORT launched the Workers' Electoral Grouping (Agrupación Electoral de los Trabajadores). In 1979, ORT merged with the Party of Labour of Spain and formed the Workers' Party (PT).
