= Party of Labour of Spain =

Defunct communist party in Spain

Party of Labour of Spain Partido del Trabajo de España
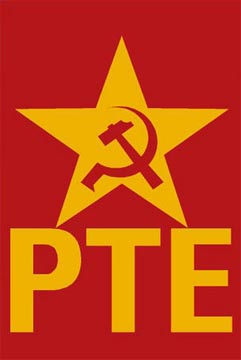
- Secretary-General: Eladio Garcia Castro
- Founded: 1967
- Youth wing: Young Red Guard of Spain
- Ideology: Marxism-Leninism; Maoism; Antifascism; Federalism
- Political position: Far-left
- Trade union affiliation: Confederación de Sindicatos Unitarios de Trabajadores (CSUT)
- Town councillors (1979–1983): 228 / 67,505

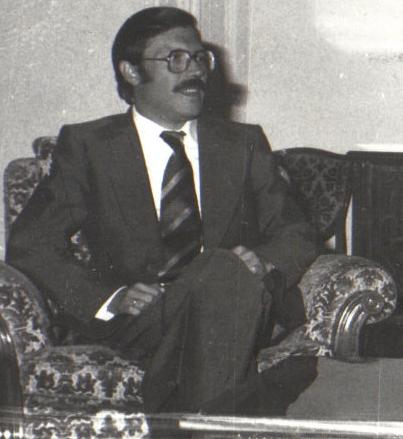
Eladio Garcia Castro

Communist Party of Spain (international) (in Spanish: Partido Comunista de España (internacional)), was a communist political party in Spain.

== History ==
The PTE was formed around 1967, following a split from the 'Unidad' group within the Unified Socialist Party of Catalonia (PSUC). The Catalan group unified with small splinter fractions of the Communist Party of Spain (PCE), especially from Seville.

At the 2nd congress of PCE(i) in 1975 the party changed its name to Party of Labour of Spain (in Spanish: Partido del Trabajo del España, PTE) and adopted an internal federal structure. A minority broke away, and regrouped themselves with the name PCE(i). In Catalonia the party worked under the name Partit del Treball de Catalunya and in Andalusia under the name Partido del Trabajo de Andalucía. The same year PTE joined the Democratic Junta of Spain.

PTE Catalonia National Committee sticker, celebrating the National Day of Catalonia

The leader of PTE was Eladio García. The youth wing of PTE was Young Red Guard of Spain (Joven Guardia Roja). PTE launched its own trade union movement, the Workers Unitary Trade Union Confederation (CSUT), as they were dissatisfied with developments in Workers' Commissions.

The central organ of PCE(i)/PTE was Mundo Obrero Rojo (-1975). In 1975-1977 it published El Correo del Pueblo and 1977-1979 Unión del Pueblo. The Basque National Committee of PTE published Jeiki and the Catalonia National Committee published Avant.

In 1977 PTE formed the Democratic Left Front (FDI) to contest the Spanish general election. In Catalonia it formed a coalition with the Republican Left of Catalonia, and contested as Left of Catalonia (Esquerra de Catalunya). In the same year the Communist Unification Party (PCU) merged into PTE.

In 1978 a section of the Catalan branch of the party broke away and formed a separate Party of Labour of Catalonia (PTC). In the 1979 general elections PTE got 192,330 votes (1.07%). Later the same year PTE merged with the Workers' Revolutionary Organisation (ORT) and formed the Workers' Party (PT).
