= Moncloa Pacts =

1977 economic and political pacts during Spanish transition to democracy

The Moncloa Pacts (Spanish: Pactos de la Moncloa) (full title: the Agreement on the Program of Sanitation and Reform of the Economy and the Agreement on the Program of Legal and Political Action) were economic and political agreements to address inflation and unemployment during the Spanish transition to democracy and were signed on October 25, 1977 at the Palacio de la Moncloa by representatives of the major labor unions. The objective was to reduce the foreign deficit and reduce inflation. After signing, the Pacts were ratified by Spain's Congress of Deputies on October 17 and the Spanish Senate on November 11.

== Economic problems ==
Spain's first democratically elected government faced many economic issues when it was elected in June 1977. These included the petrol crisis of 1973 (which had taken some time to reach Spain), the rise of unemployment to 7% exacerbated by a return of emigres to Spain after the death of Francisco Franco, inflation rising to 40%, capital flight in the last years of the dictatorship, businesses that had become used to the corporatism and interventionism of Franco's regime and the legalisation of unions which sometimes took a confrontational stance in the face of a wage freeze and devaluation of the peseta.

== Previous conversations ==
Before the Pacts Adolfo Suárez had engaged with Socialist Party leader Felipe González and Communist Party leader Santiago Carrillo. His goal was to establish a more stable government since he lacked a majority in the parliament. For its part, the Opposition, as well as a portion of Suarez's own government, the Union of the Democratic Centre (UCD), wanted a constituent assembly.

== Negotiations ==
Enrique Fuentes Quintana at Suárez's behest engaged in talks with the newly legalized unions such as General Union of Workers and Workers' Commissions (CC.OO) in order to reduce industrial conflict. The General Union of Workers (UGT) and the CNT were at first opposed to the proposals for a pact. However the CNT was the only body who wholly rejected it.

The agreements meant that the unions and the left would accept a wage freeze and moderate their demands in return for promises of fiscal, legal and institutional reform such as a property tax and income tax, parliamentary control of the media, measures to put a break on housing speculation, a review of the Military Justice Code and improved social security and free education.

== Results ==
Inflation did fall and the deficit showed a marked fall but unemployment kept rising and there was no reduction in strikes. In addition there was no oversight of the promises for structural reforms and many were shelved or were cut dramatically. The success of the Pacts was more political than social or economic as the left accepted thereby that their claims in future would be "bound by the constraints of the market economy" and the Government had the legitimacy and consensus to move forward with drafting the Constitution.

== See also ==
- Pact of Forgetting, a contemporaneous but unwritten pact by the same political actors
- Wassenaar Agreement, a 1982 Dutch agreement credited with ending the 1970s wage-price spiral

== Bibliography ==
- Casanova, Julián; Gil Andrés, Carlos (2014). Twentieth-century Spain. A History. Translated by Douch, Martin. Cambridge University Press. ISBN 978-1-107-60267-0. OCLC 870438787.
- Edles, Laura Desfor (1998). "The 1977 Moncloa Pacts and the ritualization of communality". Symbol and Ritual in the New Spain: The Transition to Democracy After Franco. Cambridge University Press. pp. 81–. ISBN 978-0-521-62885-3.
- Powell, Charles T (2001). España en democracia, 1975-2000 (in Spanish). Barcelona: Plaza y Janés. ISBN 9788401530463. OCLC 1018126644.
