= Navarre (Congress of Deputies constituency) =

Electoral constituency in Spain

Coordinates: 42°49′N 1°39′W

- Congress of Deputies; Electoral constituency
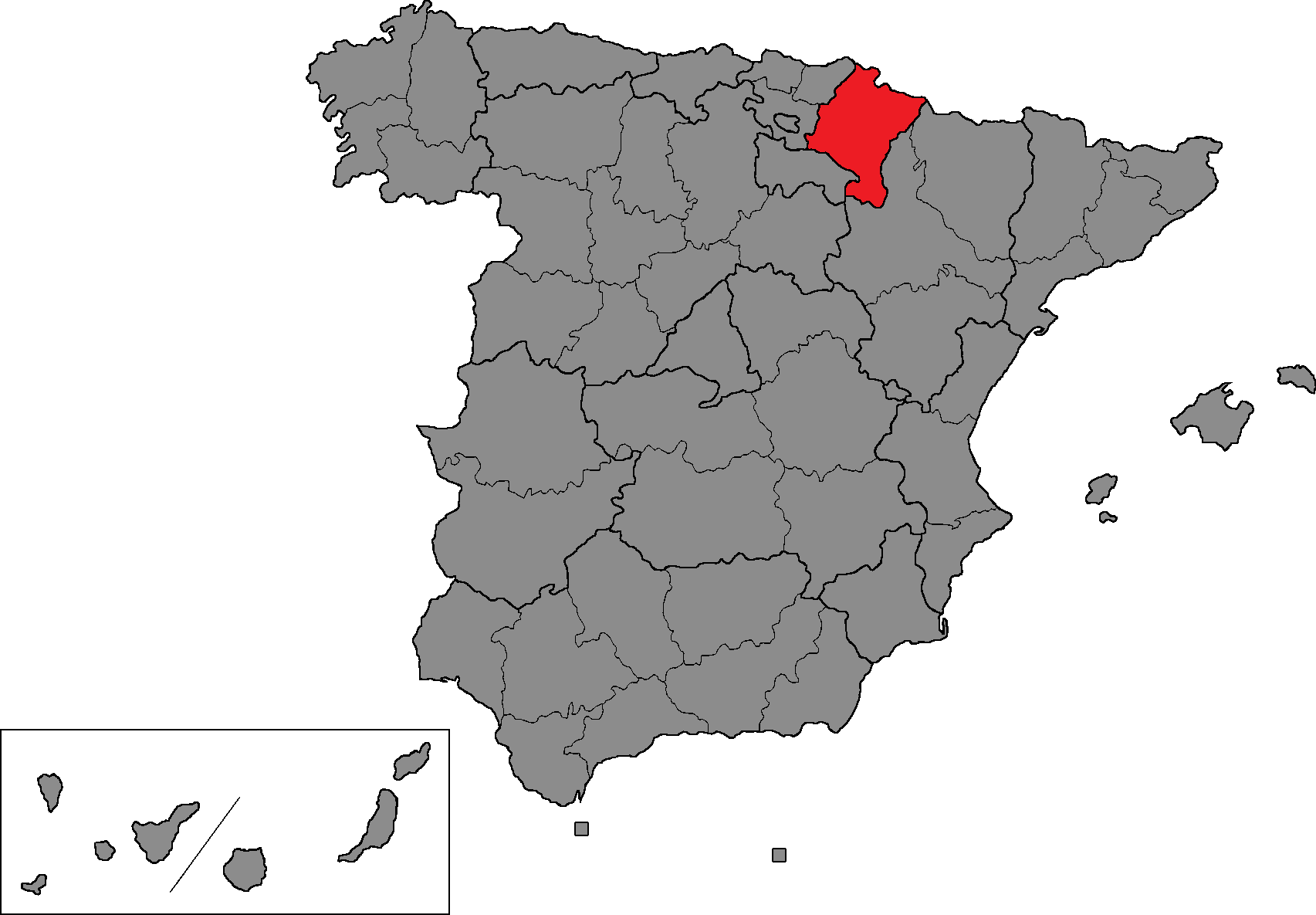
- Location of Navarre within Spain
- Province: Navarre
- Autonomous community: Navarre
- Population: ▲678,338 (2024)
- Electorate: ▲519,918 (2023)
- Major settlements: Pamplona

Current constituency
- Created: 1977
- Seats: 5
- Members: PSOE (2); EH Bildu (1); PP (1); UPN (1)

Navarre (Spanish: Navarra, Basque: Nafarroa) is one of the 52 constituencies represented in the Congress of Deputies, the lower chamber of the Spanish parliament, the Cortes Generales. The constituency (whose boundaries correspond to those of the homonymous province) currently elects five deputies. The electoral system uses the D'Hondt method and closed-list proportional voting, with a minimum threshold of three percent.

== Electoral system ==
The constituency was created as per the Political Reform Law and was first contested in the 1977 general election. The Law provided for the provinces of Spain to be established as multi-member districts in the Congress of Deputies, with this regulation being maintained under the Spanish Constitution of 1978. Additionally, the Constitution requires for any modification of the provincial limits to be approved under an organic law, needing an absolute majority in the Cortes Generales.

Voting is based on universal suffrage, comprising all Spanish nationals over 18 years of age with full political rights, provided that they have not been deprived of the right to vote by a final sentence. The only exception was in 1977, when this was limited to nationals over 21 years of age and in full enjoyment of their political and civil rights. Amendments in 2011 required non-resident citizens to apply for voting, a system known as "begged" voting (Spanish: Voto rogado). which was abolished in 2022. Further, amendments in 2018 granted the right to vote to those legally incapacitated. The Congress of Deputies has a minimum of 300 and a maximum of 400 seats, with electoral provisions fixing its size at 350. Of these, 348 are elected in 50 multi-member constituencies corresponding to the provinces of Spain—each of which is assigned an initial minimum of two seats and the remaining 248 distributed in proportion to population—using the D'Hondt method and closed-list proportional voting, with a three percent-threshold of valid votes (including blank ballots) in each constituency. The remaining two seats are allocated to Ceuta and Melilla as single-member districts elected by plurality voting. The use of this electoral method may result in a higher effective threshold depending on district magnitude and vote distribution. The law does not provide for by-elections to fill vacant seats; instead, any vacancies arising after the proclamation of candidates and during the legislative term are filled by the next candidates on the party lists or, when required, by designated substitutes.

The electoral law allows for parties and federations registered in the interior ministry, alliances and groupings of electors to present lists of candidates. Parties and federations intending to form an alliance are required to inform the relevant electoral commission within 10 days of the election call—15 before 1985—whereas groupings of electors need to secure the signature of at least one percent of the electorate in the constituencies for which they seek election—one permille of the electorate, with a compulsory minimum of 500 signatures, until 1985—disallowing electors from signing for more than one list. Also since 2011, parties, federations or alliances that have not obtained a mandate in either chamber of the Cortes at the preceding election are required to secure the signature of at least 0.1 percent of electors in the aforementioned constituencies. Amendments in 2007 required a balanced composition of men and women in the electoral lists, so that candidates of either sex made up at least 40 percent of the total composition; further amendments in 2024 required the use of a zipper system.

== Deputies ==
Deputies 1977–present
Key to parties HB Amaiur EH Bildu (Note: From 2023.) EH Bildu (Note: Until 2023.) IU UP Pod. NaBai/GBai PSOE UCD NA+ UPN PP CP AP
Legislature	Election	Distribution
Constituent	1977	2 / 3
1st	1979	1 / 3 / 1
2nd	1982	3 / 2
3rd	1986	1 / 2 / 2
4th	1989	2 / 3
5th	1993	2 / 3
6th	1996	1 / 2 / 2
7th	2000	2 / 3
8th	2004	1 / 2 / 2
9th	2008	1 / 2 / 2
10th	2011	1 / 1 / 1 / 2
11th	2015	2 / 1 / 2
12th	2016	2 / 1 / 2
13th	2019 (Apr)	1 / 2 / 2
14th	2019 (Nov)	1 / 1 / 1 / 2
15th	2023	1 / 2 / 1 / 1

== General elections ==
=== 2026 ===
Summary of the 29 November 2026 Congress of Deputies election results in Navarre
Parties and alliances	Popular vote			Seats	
Parties and alliances	Votes	%	±pp	Total	+/−
Navarrese People's Union–People's Party (UPN–PP)^{1}					
Socialist Party of Navarre (PSN–PSOE)					
Basque Country Gather (EH Bildu)					
Broad Front (Frente Amplio/Fronte Zabala)^{2}			n/a		
We Can (Podemos)^{2}			n/a		
Vox (Vox)					
Yes to the Future (GBai)					
Animalist Party with the Environment (PACMA)					
For a Fairer World (M+J)					
Workers' Front (FO)					
Communist Party of the Workers of Spain (PCTE)					
Sunflower (Eguzkilore)			New		
The Party is Over (SALF)			New		
Blank ballots					
Total				5	±0
Valid votes					
Invalid votes					
Votes cast / turnout					
Abstentions					
Registered voters	537,194				
Sources
Footnotes: ^{1} Navarrese People's Union–People's Party results are compared to the combined totals of People's Party and Navarrese People's Union in the 2023 election.; ^{2} Within the Unite alliance in the 2023 election.

=== 2023 ===
Summary of the 23 July 2023 Congress of Deputies election results in Navarre
Parties and alliances	Popular vote			Seats	
Parties and alliances	Votes	%	±pp	Total	+/−
Socialist Party of Navarre (PSN–PSOE)	93,553	27.37	+2.37	2	+1
Basque Country Gather (EH Bildu)	58,954	17.25	+0.37	1	±0
People's Party (PP)^{1}	57,134	16.71	n/a	1	+1
Navarrese People's Union (UPN)^{1}	52,188	15.27	n/a	1	–1
Unite (Sumar)^{2}	43,922	12.85	–3.71	0	–1
Vox (Vox)	19,491	5.70	–0.10	0	±0
Yes to the Future (GBai)	9,938	2.91	–0.88	0	±0
Animalist Party with the Environment (PACMA)^{3}	1,530	0.45	–0.22	0	±0
For a Fairer World (PUM+J)	1,002	0.29	+0.01	0	±0
Workers' Front (FO)	679	0.20	New	0	±0
Communist Party of the Workers of Spain (PCTE)	311	0.09	–0.02	0	±0
Zero Cuts (Recortes Cero)	252	0.07	–0.22	0	±0
Blank ballots	2,890	0.85	–0.18		
Total	341,844			5	±0
Valid votes	341,844	99.06	–0.05		
Invalid votes	3,251	0.94	+0.05		
Votes cast / turnout	345,095	66.37	+0.46		
Abstentions	174,823	33.63	–0.46		
Registered voters	519,918				
Sources
Footnotes: ^{1} Within the Sum Navarre alliance in the November 2019 election.; ^{2} Unite results are compared to United We Can totals in the November 2019 election.; ^{3} Animalist Party with the Environment results are compared to Animalist Party Against Mistreatment of Animals totals in the November 2019 election.

=== November 2019 ===
Summary of the 10 November 2019 Congress of Deputies election results in Navarre
Parties and alliances	Popular vote			Seats	
Parties and alliances	Votes	%	±pp	Total	+/−
Sum Navarre (NA+)	99,078	29.58	+0.26	2	±0
Spanish Socialist Workers' Party (PSOE)	83,734	25.00	–0.76	1	–1
Basque Country Gather (EH Bildu)	56,548	16.88	+4.14	1	+1
United We Can (Podemos–IU–Batzarre)	55,498	16.57	–2.07	1	±0
Vox (Vox)	19,440	5.80	+0.96	0	±0
Yes to the Future (GBai)	12,709	3.79	–2.29	0	±0
Animalist Party Against Mistreatment of Animals (PACMA)	2,250	0.67	–0.24	0	±0
Zero Cuts–Green Group (Recortes Cero–GV)	965	0.29	–0.06	0	±0
For a Fairer World (PUM+J)	928	0.28	–0.05	0	±0
Communist Party of the Workers of Spain (PCTE/ELAK)	381	0.11	New	0	±0
Blank ballots	3,451	1.03	±0.00		
Total	334,982			5	±0
Valid votes	334,982	99.11	+0.11		
Invalid votes	3,014	0.89	–0.11		
Votes cast / turnout	337,996	65.91	–6.62		
Abstentions	174,830	34.09	+6.62		
Registered voters	512,826				

=== April 2019 ===
Summary of the 28 April 2019 Congress of Deputies election results in Navarre
Parties and alliances	Popular vote			Seats	
Parties and alliances	Votes	%	±pp	Total	+/−
Sum Navarre (NA+)^{1}	107,619	29.32	–8.69	2	±0
Spanish Socialist Workers' Party (PSOE)	94,551	25.76	+8.41	2	+1
United We Can (Podemos–IU–Equo–Batzarre)	68,393	18.64	–9.68	1	–1
Basque Country Gather (EH Bildu)	46,765	12.74	+3.38	0	±0
Yes to the Future (GBai)	22,309	6.08	+1.80	0	±0
Vox (Vox)	17,771	4.84	New	0	±0
Animalist Party Against Mistreatment of Animals (PACMA)	3,325	0.91	+0.09	0	±0
Zero Cuts–Green Group (Recortes Cero–GV)	1,295	0.35	+0.03	0	±0
For a Fairer World (PUM+J)	1,203	0.33	New	0	±0
Blank ballots	3,767	1.03	±0.00		
Total	366,998			5	±0
Valid votes	366,998	99.00	±0.00		
Invalid votes	3,708	1.00	±0.00		
Votes cast / turnout	370,706	72.53	+5.13		
Abstentions	140,379	27.47	–5.13		
Registered voters	511,085				
Sources
Footnotes: ^{1} Sum Navarre results are compared to the combined totals of Navarrese People's Union–People's Party and Citizens–Party of the Citizenry in the 2016 election.

=== 2016 ===
Summary of the 26 June 2016 Congress of Deputies election results in Navarre
Parties and alliances	Popular vote			Seats	
Parties and alliances	Votes	%	±pp	Total	+/−
Navarrese People's Union–People's Party (UPN–PP)	106,976	31.90	+2.96	2	±0
United We Can (Podemos–IU–Equo–Batzarre)^{1}	94,972	28.32	+1.23	2	±0
Spanish Socialist Workers' Party (PSOE)	58,173	17.35	+1.83	1	±0
Basque Country Gather (EH Bildu)	31,374	9.36	–0.53	0	±0
Citizens–Party of the Citizenry (C's)	20,505	6.11	–0.96	0	±0
Yes to the Future (GBai)	14,343	4.28	–4.39	0	±0
Animalist Party Against Mistreatment of Animals (PACMA)	2,757	0.82	+0.16	0	±0
Zero Cuts–Green Group (Recortes Cero–GV)	1,089	0.32	+0.05	0	±0
Union, Progress and Democracy (UPyD)	591	0.18	–0.23	0	±0
Navarrese Freedom (Ln)	548	0.16	±0.00	0	±0
Internationalist Solidarity and Self-Management (SAIn)	539	0.16	–0.10	0	±0
Blank ballots	3,468	1.03	–0.02		
Total	335,335			5	±0
Valid votes	335,335	99.00	–0.13		
Invalid votes	3,385	1.00	+0.13		
Votes cast / turnout	338,720	67.40	–3.53		
Abstentions	163,810	32.60	+3.53		
Registered voters	502,530				
Sources
Footnotes: ^{1} United We Can results are compared to the combined totals of We Can and United Left–Assembly–Popular Unity in Common in the 2015 election.

=== 2015 ===
Summary of the 20 December 2015 Congress of Deputies election results in Navarre
Parties and alliances	Popular vote			Seats	
Parties and alliances	Votes	%	±pp	Total	+/−
Navarrese People's Union–People's Party (UPN–PP)	102,244	28.94	–9.27	2	±0
We Can (Podemos)	81,216	22.98	New	2	+2
Spanish Socialist Workers' Party (PSOE)	54,856	15.52	–6.50	1	±0
Basque Country Gather (EH Bildu)	34,939	9.89	–4.97	0	–1
Yes to the Future (GBai)	30,642	8.67	–4.14	0	–1
Citizens–Party of the Citizenry (C's)	24,969	7.07	New	0	±0
United Left–Assembly–Popular Unity in Common (IU–B–UPeC)	14,528	4.11	–1.40	0	±0
Animalist Party Against Mistreatment of Animals (PACMA)	2,343	0.66	New	0	±0
Union, Progress and Democracy (UPyD)	1,452	0.41	–1.65	0	±0
Zero Cuts–Green Group (Recortes Cero–GV)	956	0.27	New	0	±0
Internationalist Solidarity and Self-Management (SAIn)	913	0.26	–0.06	0	±0
Navarrese Freedom (Ln)	576	0.16	New	0	±0
Blank ballots	3,714	1.05	–0.98		
Total	353,348			5	±0
Valid votes	353,348	99.13	+0.72		
Invalid votes	3,114	0.87	–0.72		
Votes cast / turnout	356,462	70.93	+2.02		
Abstentions	146,058	29.07	–2.02		
Registered voters	502,520				

=== 2011 ===
Summary of the 20 November 2011 Congress of Deputies election results in Navarre
Parties and alliances	Popular vote			Seats	
Parties and alliances	Votes	%	±pp	Total	+/−
Navarrese People's Union–People's Party (UPN–PP)	126,516	38.21	–1.01	2	±0
Spanish Socialist Workers' Party (PSOE)	72,892	22.02	–12.74	1	–1
Amaiur (Amaiur)	49,208	14.86	New	1	+1
Yes to the Future (GBai)^{1}	42,415	12.81	–5.58	1	±0
Left: Plural Left (I–E (n))^{2}	18,251	5.51	+2.24	0	±0
Union, Progress and Democracy (UPyD)	6,829	2.06	+1.29	0	±0
Equo (Equo)	3,656	1.10	New	0	±0
Pirate Party (Pirata)	1,804	0.54	New	0	±0
For a Fairer World (PUM+J)	1,393	0.42	+0.25	0	±0
Internationalist Solidarity and Self-Management (SAIn)	1,061	0.32	+0.21	0	±0
Communist Unification of Spain (UCE)	353	0.11	New	0	±0
Navarrese and Spanish Right (DNE)	0	0.00	New	0	±0
Blank ballots	6,707	2.03	+0.56		
Total	331,085			5	±0
Valid votes	331,085	98.41	–0.90		
Invalid votes	5,355	1.59	+0.90		
Votes cast / turnout	336,440	68.91	–3.15		
Abstentions	151,771	31.09	+3.15		
Registered voters	488,211				
Sources
Footnotes: ^{1} Yes to the Future results are compared to Navarre Yes totals in the 2008 election.; ^{2} Left: Plural Left results are compared to United Left of Navarre totals in the 2008 election.

=== 2008 ===
Summary of the 9 March 2008 Congress of Deputies election results in Navarre
Parties and alliances	Popular vote			Seats	
Parties and alliances	Votes	%	±pp	Total	+/−
Navarrese People's Union–People's Party (UPN–PP)	133,059	39.22	+1.62	2	±0
Spanish Socialist Workers' Party (PSOE)	117,920	34.76	+1.21	2	±0
Navarre Yes (NaBai)	62,398	18.39	+0.41	1	±0
United Left of Navarre–Alternative (IUN/NEB)	11,098	3.27	–2.59	0	±0
Union, Progress and Democracy (UPyD)	2,608	0.77	New	0	±0
Navarrese Cannabis Representation (RCN/NOK)	2,288	0.67	New	0	±0
The Greens–Green Group (LV–GV)	1,252	0.37	New	0	±0
For a Fairer World (PUM+J)	560	0.17	New	0	±0
Anti-Bullfighting Party Against Mistreatment of Animals (PACMA)	530	0.16	New	0	±0
Social Democratic Party (PSD)	478	0.14	New	0	±0
Internationalist Solidarity and Self-Management (SAIn)	360	0.11	New	0	±0
Carlist Party (PC)	324	0.10	–0.08	0	±0
Family and Life Party (PFyV)	239	0.07	–0.16	0	±0
Citizens–Party of the Citizenry (C's)	218	0.06	New	0	±0
Communist Party of the Peoples of Spain–Basque Communists (PCPE–EK)	213	0.06	New	0	±0
Humanist Party (PH)	188	0.06	–0.22	0	±0
National Democracy (DN)	137	0.04	–0.06	0	±0
Spanish Phalanx of the CNSO (FE de las JONS)	128	0.04	New	0	±0
Spain 2000 (E–2000)	91	0.03	–0.04	0	±0
Spanish Alternative (AES)	90	0.03	New	0	±0
Authentic Phalanx (FA)	50	0.01	New	0	±0
Blank ballots	5,001	1.47	–0.51		
Total	339,230			5	±0
Valid votes	339,230	99.31	+3.77		
Invalid votes	2,360	0.69	–3.77		
Votes cast / turnout	341,590	72.06	–4.16		
Abstentions	132,468	27.94	+4.16		
Registered voters	474,058				

=== 2004 ===
Summary of the 14 March 2004 Congress of Deputies election results in Navarre
Parties and alliances	Popular vote			Seats	
Parties and alliances	Votes	%	±pp	Total	+/−
Navarrese People's Union–People's Party (UPN–PP)	127,653	37.60	–12.29	2	–1
Spanish Socialist Workers' Party (PSOE)	113,906	33.55	+6.23	2	±0
Navarre Yes (NaBai)^{1}	61,045	17.98	+11.13	1	+1
United Left of Navarre (IUN/NEB)	19,899	5.86	–1.75	0	±0
Convergence of Democrats of Navarre (CDN)	5,573	1.64	–1.22	0	±0
Humanist Party (PH)	958	0.28	–0.04	0	±0
Family and Life Party (PFyV)	778	0.23	New	0	±0
Democratic and Social Centre (CDS)	763	0.22	+0.05	0	±0
Republican Left (IR)	634	0.19	New	0	±0
Carlist Party (PC)	620	0.18	–0.03	0	±0
National Democracy (DN)	351	0.10	New	0	±0
Spain 2000 (E–2000)	221	0.07	–0.02	0	±0
The Phalanx (FE)	195	0.06	–0.09	0	±0
Republican Social Movement (MSR)	173	0.05	New	0	±0
Blank ballots	6,739	1.98	–1.97		
Total	339,508			5	±0
Valid votes	339,508	95.54	–3.22		
Invalid votes	15,831	4.46	+3.22		
Votes cast / turnout	355,339	76.22	+10.15		
Abstentions	110,842	23.78	–10.15		
Registered voters	466,181				
Sources
Footnotes: ^{1} Navarre Yes results are compared to the combined totals of Basque Solidarity and Basque Nationalist Party in the 2000 election.

=== 2000 ===
Summary of the 12 March 2000 Congress of Deputies election results in Navarre
Parties and alliances	Popular vote			Seats	
Parties and alliances	Votes	%	±pp	Total	+/−
Navarrese People's Union–People's Party (UPN–PP)	150,995	49.89	+12.77	3	+1
Spanish Socialist Workers' Party–Progressives (PSOE–p)	82,688	27.32	–2.94	2	±0
United Left of Navarre (IUN/NEB)	23,038	7.61	–4.84	0	–1
Basque Solidarity (EA)	14,185	4.69	+0.92	0	±0
Convergence of Democrats of Navarre (CDN)	8,646	2.86	–2.39	0	±0
Basque Nationalist Party (EAJ/PNV)	6,536	2.16	+1.19	0	±0
Natural Law Party (PLN)	1,366	0.45	New	0	±0
Humanist Party (PH)	970	0.32	+0.03	0	±0
Carlist Party (EKA)	650	0.21	New	0	±0
Democratic and Social Centre–Centrist Union (CDS–UC)	529	0.17	+0.06	0	±0
The Phalanx (FE)	455	0.15	New	0	±0
Spain 2000 Platform (ES2000)	267	0.09	New	0	±0
Internationalist Struggle (LI (LIT–CI))	263	0.09	New	0	±0
Independent Spanish Phalanx–Phalanx 2000 (FEI–FE 2000)	153	0.05	New	0	±0
Basque Citizens (EH)^{1}	0	0.00	–8.16	0	±0
Blank ballots	11,945	3.95	+2.26		
Total	302,686			5	±0
Valid votes	302,686	98.76	–0.62		
Invalid votes	3,808	1.24	+0.62		
Votes cast / turnout	306,494	66.07	–7.38		
Abstentions	157,398	33.93	+7.38		
Registered voters	463,892				
Sources
Footnotes: ^{1} Basque Citizens results are compared to Popular Unity totals in the 1996 election. EH called for election boycott and urged its supporters to abstain.

=== 1996 ===
Summary of the 3 March 1996 Congress of Deputies election results in Navarre
Parties and alliances	Popular vote			Seats	
Parties and alliances	Votes	%	±pp	Total	+/−
Navarrese People's Union–People's Party (UPN–PP)	120,335	37.12	+0.99	2	–1
Spanish Socialist Workers' Party (PSOE)	98,102	30.26	–4.61	2	±0
United Left of Navarre (IU/EB)	40,354	12.45	+3.74	1	+1
Popular Unity (HB)	26,451	8.16	–2.21	0	±0
Convergence of Democrats of Navarre (CDN)	17,020	5.25	New	0	±0
Basque Solidarity (EA)	12,233	3.77	+0.09	0	±0
Basque Nationalist Party (EAJ/PNV)	3,158	0.97	–0.17	0	±0
Workers' Revolutionary Party (PRT)	501	0.15	New	0	±0
Centrist Union (UC)	356	0.11	–1.58	0	±0
Authentic Spanish Phalanx (FEA)	196	0.06	New	0	±0
Blank ballots	5,480	1.69	+0.24		
Total	324,186			5	±0
Valid votes	324,186	99.38	+0.14		
Invalid votes	2,015	0.62	–0.14		
Votes cast / turnout	326,201	73.45	–0.13		
Abstentions	117,893	26.55	+0.13		
Registered voters	444,094				

=== 1993 ===
Summary of the 6 June 1993 Congress of Deputies election results in Navarre
Parties and alliances	Popular vote			Seats	
Parties and alliances	Votes	%	±pp	Total	+/−
Navarrese People's Union–People's Party (UPN–PP)	112,228	36.13	+2.95	3	±0
Spanish Socialist Workers' Party (PSOE)^{1}	108,305	34.87	+0.82	2	±0
Popular Unity (HB)	32,221	10.37	–0.65	0	±0
United Left (IU/EB)	27,043	8.71	+2.96	0	±0
Basque Solidarity–Basque Left (EA–EuE)	11,437	3.68	–1.12	0	±0
Democratic and Social Centre (CDS)	5,241	1.69	–5.34	0	±0
The Greens (LV)	4,263	1.37	New	0	±0
Basque Nationalist Party (EAJ/PNV)	3,540	1.14	+0.22	0	±0
Ruiz-Mateos Group–European Democratic Alliance (ARM–ADE)	903	0.29	–0.38	0	±0
Natural Law Party (PLN)	332	0.11	New	0	±0
Humanist Party (PH)	244	0.08	New	0	±0
Revolutionary Workers' Party (POR)	201	0.06	–0.03	0	±0
Coalition for a New Socialist Party (CNPS)^{2}	172	0.06	–0.04	0	±0
Communist Unification of Spain (UCE)	0	0.00	New	0	±0
Blank ballots	4,495	1.45	+0.39		
Total	310,625			5	±0
Valid votes	310,625	99.24	+0.03		
Invalid votes	2,374	0.76	–0.03		
Votes cast / turnout	312,999	73.58	+5.04		
Abstentions	112,388	26.42	–5.04		
Registered voters	425,387				
Sources
Footnotes: ^{1} Spanish Socialist Workers' Party results are compared to the combined totals of Spanish Socialist Workers' Party and Basque Country Left in the 1989 election.; ^{2} Coalition for a New Socialist Party results are compared to Alliance for the Republic totals in the 1989 election.

=== 1989 ===
Summary of the 29 October 1989 Congress of Deputies election results in Navarre
Parties and alliances	Popular vote			Seats	
Parties and alliances	Votes	%	±pp	Total	+/−
Navarrese People's Union–People's Party (UPN–PP)^{1}	92,216	33.18	+3.55	3	+1
Spanish Socialist Workers' Party (PSOE)	86,677	31.19	–4.33	2	±0
Popular Unity (HB)	30,632	11.02	–2.89	0	–1
Democratic and Social Centre (CDS)	19,538	7.03	–2.53	0	±0
United Left (IU)	15,979	5.75	+4.20	0	±0
Basque Solidarity (EA)	13,342	4.80	New	0	±0
Basque Country Left (EE)	7,949	2.86	+0.06	0	±0
Nationalists of Navarre (PNV–NV)	2,562	0.92	–0.89	0	±0
Ruiz-Mateos Group (Ruiz-Mateos)	1,867	0.67	New	0	±0
Social Democratic Coalition (CSD)	1,541	0.55	New	0	±0
Workers' Socialist Party (PST)	1,105	0.40	–0.04	0	±0
Workers' Party of Spain–Communist Unity (PTE–UC)^{2}	510	0.18	–0.39	0	±0
Communist Party of the Peoples of Spain (PCPE)	333	0.12	New	0	±0
Alliance for the Republic (AxR)^{3}	275	0.10	–0.03	0	±0
Revolutionary Workers' Party of Spain (PORE)	240	0.09	New	0	±0
Spanish Phalanx of the CNSO (FE–JONS)	211	0.08	New	0	±0
Communist Party of Spain (Marxist–Leninist) (PCE (m–l))^{4}	0	0.00	–0.16	0	±0
Revolutionary Communist League–Communist Movement (LKI–EMK)^{5}	0	0.00	±0.00	0	±0
Blank ballots	2,960	1.06	+0.07		
Total	277,937			5	±0
Valid votes	277,937	99.21	+1.19		
Invalid votes	2,213	0.79	–1.19		
Votes cast / turnout	280,150	68.54	–1.26		
Abstentions	128,568	31.46	+1.26		
Registered voters	408,718				
Sources
Footnotes: ^{1} Navarrese People's Union–People's Party results are compared to People's Coalition totals in the 1986 election.; ^{2} Workers' Party of Spain–Communist Unity results are compared to Communists' Unity Board totals in the 1986 election.; ^{3} Alliance for the Republic results are compared to Internationalist Socialist Workers' Party totals in the 1986 election.; ^{4} Communist Party of Spain (Marxist–Leninist) results are compared to Republican Popular Unity totals in the 1986 election.; ^{5} Revolutionary Communist League–Communist Movement results are compared to the combined totals of Communist Movement of the Basque Country and Revolutionary Communist League in the 1986 election.

=== 1986 ===
Summary of the 22 June 1986 Congress of Deputies election results in Navarre
Parties and alliances	Popular vote			Seats	
Parties and alliances	Votes	%	±pp	Total	+/−
Spanish Socialist Workers' Party (PSOE)	97,010	35.52	–2.12	2	–1
People's Coalition (AP–PL–UPN)^{1}	80,922	29.63	+4.04	2	±0
Popular Unity (HB)	37,998	13.91	+2.25	1	+1
Democratic and Social Centre (CDS)	26,106	9.56	+5.44	0	±0
Basque Country Left (EE)	7,645	2.80	–0.02	0	±0
Democratic Reformist Party (PRD)	5,481	2.01	New	0	±0
Basque Nationalist Party (EAJ/PNV)	4,935	1.81	–3.68	0	±0
United Left (IU)^{2}	4,244	1.55	+0.83	0	±0
Moderate Party–Centrists of Navarre (PMCN)	1,932	0.71	New	0	±0
Communists' Unity Board (MUC)	1,552	0.57	New	0	±0
Workers' Socialist Party (PST)	1,202	0.44	+0.07	0	±0
Communist Unification of Spain (UCE)	618	0.23	+0.14	0	±0
Republican Popular Unity (UPR)^{3}	446	0.16	+0.06	0	±0
Internationalist Socialist Workers' Party (POSI)	349	0.13	New	0	±0
Revolutionary Communist League (LKI)	0	0.00	±0.00	0	±0
Communist Movement of the Basque Country (EMK)	0	0.00	±0.00	0	±0
Blank ballots	2,712	0.99	+0.36		
Total	273,152			5	±0
Valid votes	273,152	98.02	+0.53		
Invalid votes	5,529	1.98	–0.53		
Votes cast / turnout	278,681	69.80	–11.53		
Abstentions	120,597	30.20	+11.53		
Registered voters	399,278				
Sources
Footnotes: ^{1} People's Coalition results are compared to Navarrese People's Union–Alliance–People's Democratic totals in the 1982 election.; ^{2} United Left results are compared to Communist Party of the Basque Country totals in the 1982 election.; ^{3} Republican Popular Unity results are compared to Communist Party of Spain (Marxist–Leninist) totals in the 1982 election.

=== 1982 ===
Summary of the 28 October 1982 Congress of Deputies election results in Navarre
Parties and alliances	Popular vote			Seats	
Parties and alliances	Votes	%	±pp	Total	+/−
Spanish Socialist Workers' Party (PSOE)	112,186	37.64	+15.74	3	+2
Navarrese People's Union–Alliance–People's Democratic (UPN–AP–PDP)^{1}	76,255	25.59	+14.42	2	+1
Popular Unity (HB)	34,744	11.66	+2.80	0	±0
Union of the Democratic Centre (UCD)	31,245	10.48	–22.45	0	–3
Basque Nationalist Party (EAJ/PNV)	16,363	5.49	–2.93	0	±0
Democratic and Social Centre (CDS)	12,278	4.12	New	0	±0
Basque Country Left–Left for Socialism (EE)	8,399	2.82	New	0	±0
Communist Party of the Basque Country (PCE/EPK)	2,144	0.72	–1.50	0	±0
Workers' Socialist Party (PST)	1,088	0.37	New	0	±0
New Force (FN)^{2}	459	0.15	New	0	±0
Communist Party of Spain (Marxist–Leninist) (PCE (m–l))	311	0.10	New	0	±0
Communist Unification of Spain (UCE)	278	0.09	New	0	±0
Communist Unity Candidacy (CUC)	235	0.08	New	0	±0
Communist League–Internationalist Socialist Workers' Coalition (LC (COSI))	141	0.05	–0.21	0	±0
Communist Movement of the Basque Country (EMK)	0	0.00	–1.17	0	±0
Revolutionary Communist League (LKI)	0	0.00	–0.41	0	±0
Blank ballots	1,885	0.63	+0.31		
Total	298,011			5	±0
Valid votes	298,011	97.49	–0.95		
Invalid votes	7,682	2.51	+0.95		
Votes cast / turnout	305,693	81.33	+10.67		
Abstentions	70,153	18.67	–10.67		
Registered voters	375,846				
Sources
Footnotes: ^{1} Navarrese People's Union–Alliance–People's Democratic results are compared to Navarrese People's Union totals in the 1979 election.; ^{2} New Force results are compared to National Union totals in the 1979 election.

=== 1979 ===
Summary of the 1 March 1979 Congress of Deputies election results in Navarre
Parties and alliances	Popular vote			Seats	
Parties and alliances	Votes	%	±pp	Total	+/−
Union of the Democratic Centre (UCD)	83,302	32.93	+3.90	3	±0
Spanish Socialist Workers' Party (PSOE)^{1}	55,399	21.90	–1.83	1	–1
Navarrese People's Union (UPN)	28,248	11.17	New	1	+1
Popular Unity (HB)^{2}	22,425	8.86	n/a	0	±0
Basque Nationalist Party (EAJ/PNV)^{2}	21,305	8.42	n/a	0	±0
Carlist Party (PC)	19,522	7.72	+4.45	0	±0
Navarrese Left Union (UNAI)^{3}	10,970	4.34	–10.24	0	±0
Communist Party of the Basque Country (PCE/EPK)	5,619	2.22	–0.22	0	±0
Communist Movement–Organization of Communist Left (MC–OIC)	2,962	1.17	New	0	±0
Revolutionary Communist League (LCR)^{4}	1,040	0.41	–0.12	0	±0
Communist League (LC)	660	0.26	New	0	±0
Republican Left (IR)	514	0.20	New	0	±0
Proverist Party (PPr)	205	0.08	New	0	±0
Blank ballots	821	0.32	+0.09		
Total	252,992			5	±0
Valid votes	252,992	98.44	–0.01		
Invalid votes	4,013	1.56	+0.01		
Votes cast / turnout	257,005	70.66	–11.58		
Abstentions	106,708	29.34	+11.58		
Registered voters	363,713				
Sources
Footnotes: ^{1} Spanish Socialist Workers' Party results are compared to the combined totals of Spanish Socialist Workers' Party and People's Socialist Party–Socialist Unity in the 1977 election.; ^{2} Within the Navarrese Autonomist Union alliance in the 1977 election.; ^{3} Navarrese Left Union results are compared to the combined totals of Navarrese Left Union and Workers' Electoral Group totals in the 1977 election.; ^{4} Revolutionary Communist League results are compared to Front for Workers' Unity totals in the 1977 election.

=== 1977 ===
Summary of the 15 June 1977 Congress of Deputies election results in Navarre
Parties and alliances	Popular vote			Seats	
Parties and alliances	Votes	%	±pp	Total	+/−
Union of the Democratic Centre (UCD)	75,036	29.03	n/a	3	n/a
Spanish Socialist Workers' Party (PSOE)	54,720	21.17	n/a	2	n/a
Navarrese Left Union (UNAI)	24,489	9.47	n/a	0	n/a
Navarrese Foral Alliance (AFN)	21,900	8.47	n/a	0	n/a
Navarrese Autonomist Union (PNV–ANV–ESB)	18,079	6.99	n/a	0	n/a
Workers' Electoral Group (AET)	13,195	5.11	n/a	0	n/a
Independent Navarrese Front (FNI)	10,606	4.10	n/a	0	n/a
Federation of Christian Democracy (FPD–ID)	10,450	4.04	n/a	0	n/a
Montejurra–Federalism–Self-Management (MFA)	8,451	3.27	n/a	0	n/a
Democratic Left Front (FDI)	6,631	2.57	n/a	0	n/a
People's Socialist Party–Socialist Unity (PSP–US)	6,629	2.56	n/a	0	n/a
Communist Party of Spain (PCE)	6,319	2.44	n/a	0	n/a
Front for Workers' Unity (FUT)	1,361	0.53	n/a	0	n/a
Blank ballots	598	0.23	n/a		
Total	258,464			5	n/a
Valid votes	258,464	98.45	n/a		
Invalid votes	4,058	1.55	n/a		
Votes cast / turnout	262,522	82.24	n/a		
Abstentions	56,700	17.76	n/a		
Registered voters	319,222				

== Bibliography ==
- Ley 1/1977, de 4 de enero, para la Reforma Política (Fundamental Law 1/1977). Official State Gazette (in Spanish). 4 January 1977. BOE-A-1977-165.
- Real Decreto-ley 20/1977, de 18 de marzo, sobre Normas Electorales (Royal Decree-Law 20/1977). Official State Gazette (in Spanish). 18 March 1977. BOE-A-1977-7445.
- Constitución Española (Constitution). Official State Gazette (in Spanish). 27 December 1978. BOE-A-1978-31229.
- Ley Orgánica 5/1985, de 19 de junio, del Régimen Electoral General (Organic Law 5/1985). Official State Gazette (in Spanish). 19 June 1985. BOE-A-1985-11672.
- Carreras de Odriozola, Albert; Tafunell Sambola, Xavier (2005) [1989]. Estadísticas históricas de España, siglos XIX-XX (PDF) (in Spanish). Vol. 1 (II ed.). Bilbao: Fundación BBVA. pp. 1072–1097. ISBN 84-96515-00-1. Archived from the original (PDF) on 24 September 2015.
