= Álava (Congress of Deputies constituency) =

Electoral constituency in Spain

Coordinates: 42°50′N 2°45′W

- Congress of Deputies; Electoral constituency
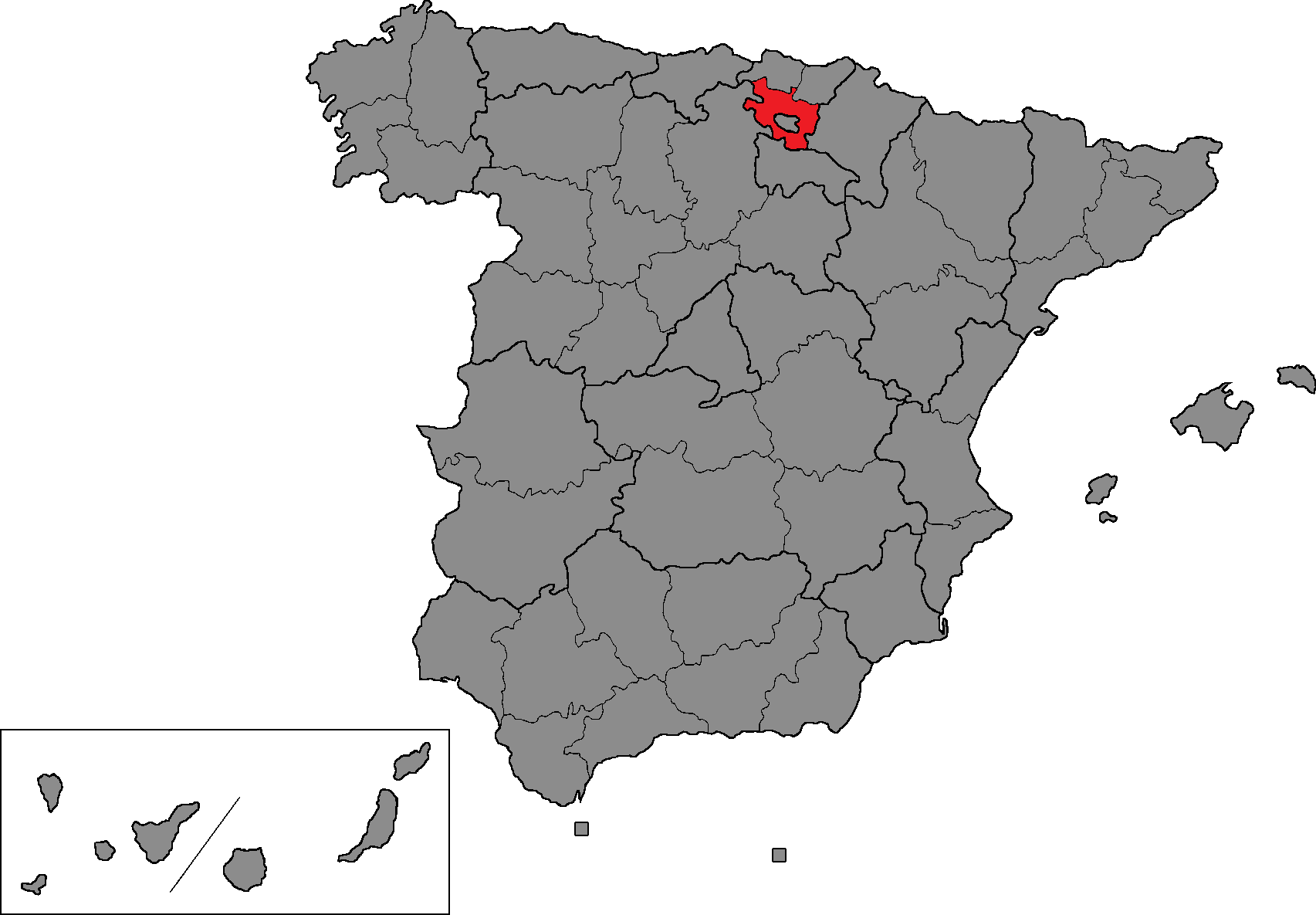
- Location of Álava within Spain
- Province: Álava
- Autonomous community: Basque Country
- Population: ▲339,137 (2024)
- Electorate: ▲260,214 (2023)
- Major settlements: Vitoria-Gasteiz

Current constituency
- Created: 1977
- Seats: 4
- Members: PSOE (1); EH Bildu (1); PP (1); PNV (1)

Álava (Basque: Araba) is one of the 52 constituencies represented in the Congress of Deputies, the lower chamber of the Spanish parliament, the Cortes Generales. The constituency (whose boundaries correspond to those of the homonymous province) currently elects four deputies. The electoral system uses the D'Hondt method and closed-list proportional voting, with a minimum threshold of three percent.

== Electoral system ==
The constituency was created as per the Political Reform Law and was first contested in the 1977 general election. The Law provided for the provinces of Spain to be established as multi-member districts in the Congress of Deputies, with this regulation being maintained under the Spanish Constitution of 1978. Additionally, the Constitution requires for any modification of the provincial limits to be approved under an organic law, needing an absolute majority in the Cortes Generales.

Voting is based on universal suffrage, comprising all Spanish nationals over 18 years of age with full political rights, provided that they have not been deprived of the right to vote by a final sentence. The only exception was in 1977, when this was limited to nationals over 21 years of age and in full enjoyment of their political and civil rights. Amendments in 2011 required non-resident citizens to apply for voting, a system known as "begged" voting (Spanish: Voto rogado). which was abolished in 2022. Further, amendments in 2018 granted the right to vote to those legally incapacitated. The Congress of Deputies has a minimum of 300 and a maximum of 400 seats, with electoral provisions fixing its size at 350. Of these, 348 are elected in 50 multi-member constituencies corresponding to the provinces of Spain—each of which is assigned an initial minimum of two seats and the remaining 248 distributed in proportion to population—using the D'Hondt method and closed-list proportional voting, with a three percent-threshold of valid votes (including blank ballots) in each constituency. The remaining two seats are allocated to Ceuta and Melilla as single-member districts elected by plurality voting. The use of this electoral method may result in a higher effective threshold depending on district magnitude and vote distribution. The law does not provide for by-elections to fill vacant seats; instead, any vacancies arising after the proclamation of candidates and during the legislative term are filled by the next candidates on the party lists or, when required, by designated substitutes.

The electoral law allows for parties and federations registered in the interior ministry, alliances and groupings of electors to present lists of candidates. Parties and federations intending to form an alliance are required to inform the relevant electoral commission within 10 days of the election call—15 before 1985—whereas groupings of electors need to secure the signature of at least one percent of the electorate in the constituencies for which they seek election—one permille of the electorate, with a compulsory minimum of 500 signatures, until 1985—disallowing electors from signing for more than one list. Also since 2011, parties, federations or alliances that have not obtained a mandate in either chamber of the Cortes at the preceding election are required to secure the signature of at least 0.1 percent of electors in the aforementioned constituencies. Amendments in 2007 required a balanced composition of men and women in the electoral lists, so that candidates of either sex made up at least 40 percent of the total composition; further amendments in 2024 required the use of a zipper system.

== Deputies ==
Deputies 1977–present
Key to parties Amaiur EHB (Note: From 2023.) EHB (Note: Until 2023.) UP Pod. PSOE PNV UCD PP CP AP
Legislature	Election	Distribution
Constituent	1977	1 / 1 / 2
1st	1979	1 / 1 / 2
2nd	1982	2 / 1 / 1
3rd	1986	2 / 1 / 1
4th	1989	2 / 1 / 1
5th	1993	2 / 1 / 1
6th	1996	1 / 1 / 2
7th	2000	1 / 1 / 2
8th	2004	2 / 1 / 1
9th	2008	2 / 1 / 1
10th	2011	1 / 1 / 1 / 1
11th	2015	1 / 1 / 1 / 1
12th	2016	1 / 1 / 1 / 1
13th	2019 (Apr)	1 / 1 / 1 / 1
14th	2019 (Nov)	1 / 1 / 1 / 1
15th	2023	1 / 1 / 1 / 1

== General elections ==
=== 2026 ===
Summary of the 29 November 2026 Congress of Deputies election results in Álava
Parties and alliances	Popular vote			Seats	
Parties and alliances	Votes	%	±pp	Total	+/−
Socialist Party of the Basque Country–Basque Country Left (PSE–EE (PSOE))					
Basque Country Gather (EH Bildu)					
Basque Nationalist Party (EAJ/PNV)					
People's Party (PP)					
Broad Front (FA)^{1}			n/a		
We Can (Podemos)^{1}			n/a		
Vox (Vox)					
Animalist Party with the Environment (PACMA)					
Blank Seats to Leave Empty Seats (EB)					
Workers' Front (FO)					
Communist Party of the Workers of the Basque Country (PCTE/ELAK)					
For a Fairer World (M+J)					
The Party is Over (SALF)			New		
Feminists to the Congress (PFAC)			New		
Blank ballots					
Total				4	±0
Valid votes					
Invalid votes					
Votes cast / turnout					
Abstentions					
Registered voters	267,325				
Sources
Footnotes: ^{1} Within the Unite alliance in the 2023 election.

=== 2023 ===
Summary of the 23 July 2023 Congress of Deputies election results in Álava
Parties and alliances	Popular vote			Seats	
Parties and alliances	Votes	%	±pp	Total	+/−
Socialist Party of the Basque Country–Basque Country Left (PSE–EE (PSOE))	46,775	27.66	+5.72	1	±0
Basque Country Gather (EH Bildu)	32,987	19.51	+3.44	1	±0
People's Party (PP)	30,212	17.87	+2.94	1	+1
Basque Nationalist Party (EAJ/PNV)	28,075	16.60	–6.97	1	±0
Unite (Sumar)^{1}	21,561	12.75	–3.75	0	–1
Vox (Vox)	6,573	3.89	+0.13	0	±0
Animalist Party with the Environment (PACMA)^{2}	773	0.46	–0.21	0	±0
Blank Seats to Leave Empty Seats (EB)	619	0.37	New	0	±0
Workers' Front (FO)	354	0.21	New	0	±0
Zero Cuts (Recortes Cero)	185	0.11	–0.13	0	±0
Communist Party of the Workers of the Basque Country (PCTE/ELAK)	165	0.10	–0.03	0	±0
For a Fairer World (PUM+J)	106	0.06	–0.13	0	±0
Blank ballots	722	0.43	–0.10		
Total	169,107			4	±0
Valid votes	169,107	99.16	–0.06		
Invalid votes	1,431	0.84	+0.06		
Votes cast / turnout	170,538	65.54	–1.08		
Abstentions	89,676	34.46	+1.08		
Registered voters	260,214				
Sources
Footnotes: ^{1} Unite results are compared to United We Can totals in the November 2019 election.; ^{2} Animalist Party with the Environment results are compared to Animalist Party Against Mistreatment of Animals totals in the November 2019 election.

=== November 2019 ===
Summary of the 10 November 2019 Congress of Deputies election results in Álava
Parties and alliances	Popular vote			Seats	
Parties and alliances	Votes	%	±pp	Total	+/−
Basque Nationalist Party (EAJ/PNV)	40,262	23.57	+0.85	1	±0
Socialist Party of the Basque Country–Basque Country Left (PSE–EE (PSOE))	37,488	21.94	–0.46	1	±0
United We Can (Podemos–IU)	28,186	16.50	–1.24	1	±0
Basque Country Gather (EH Bildu)	27,453	16.07	+2.12	1	±0
People's Party (PP)	25,506	14.93	+1.18	0	±0
Vox (Vox)	6,421	3.76	+0.60	0	±0
Citizens–Party of the Citizenry (Cs)	2,526	1.48	–2.51	0	±0
Animalist Party Against Mistreatment of Animals (PACMA)	1,152	0.67	–0.38	0	±0
Zero Cuts–Green Group (Recortes Cero–GV)	409	0.24	–0.06	0	±0
For a Fairer World (PUM+J)	326	0.19	±0.00	0	±0
Communist Party of the Workers of the Basque Country (PCTE/ELAK)	215	0.13	±0.00	0	±0
Blank ballots	911	0.53	–0.08		
Total	170,855			4	±0
Valid votes	170,855	99.22	+0.24		
Invalid votes	1,344	0.78	–0.24		
Votes cast / turnout	172,199	66.62	–2.89		
Abstentions	86,296	33.38	+2.89		
Registered voters	258,495				

=== April 2019 ===
Summary of the 28 April 2019 Congress of Deputies election results in Álava
Parties and alliances	Popular vote			Seats	
Parties and alliances	Votes	%	±pp	Total	+/−
Basque Nationalist Party (EAJ/PNV)	40,300	22.72	+6.79	1	±0
Socialist Party of the Basque Country–Basque Country Left (PSE–EE (PSOE))	39,722	22.40	+6.66	1	±0
United We Can (Podemos–IU–Equo Berdeak)	31,469	17.74	–13.18	1	±0
Basque Country Gather (EH Bildu)	24,747	13.95	+4.49	1	+1
People's Party (PP)	24,385	13.75	–6.70	0	–1
Citizens–Party of the Citizenry (Cs)	7,082	3.99	–1.00	0	±0
Vox (Vox)	5,608	3.16	+2.98	0	±0
Animalist Party Against Mistreatment of Animals (PACMA)	1,869	1.05	+0.06	0	±0
Zero Cuts–Green Group (Recortes Cero–GV)	536	0.30	–0.06	0	±0
For a Fairer World (PUM+J)	338	0.19	New	0	±0
Communist Party of the Workers of the Basque Country (PCTE/ELAK)	235	0.13	New	0	±0
Blank ballots	1,075	0.61	–0.03		
Total	177,366			4	±0
Valid votes	177,366	98.98	–0.02		
Invalid votes	1,820	1.02	+0.02		
Votes cast / turnout	179,186	69.51	+3.00		
Abstentions	78,611	30.49	–3.00		
Registered voters	257,797				

=== 2016 ===
Summary of the 26 June 2016 Congress of Deputies election results in Álava
Parties and alliances	Popular vote			Seats	
Parties and alliances	Votes	%	±pp	Total	+/−
United We Can (Podemos/Ahal Dugu–IU–Equo)^{1}	51,827	30.92	+0.10	1	±0
People's Party (PP)	34,276	20.45	+1.65	1	±0
Basque Nationalist Party (EAJ/PNV)	26,703	15.93	+0.11	1	±0
Socialist Party of the Basque Country–Basque Country Left (PSE–EE (PSOE))	26,381	15.74	+1.60	1	±0
Basque Country Gather (EH Bildu)	15,858	9.46	–2.39	0	±0
Citizens–Party of the Citizenry (C's)	8,372	4.99	–0.88	0	±0
Animalist Party Against Mistreatment of Animals (PACMA)	1,657	0.99	+0.22	0	±0
Zero Cuts–Green Group (Recortes Cero–GV)	599	0.36	+0.05	0	±0
Vox (Vox)	306	0.18	New	0	±0
Union, Progress and Democracy (UPyD)	298	0.18	–0.25	0	±0
Communist Party of the Peoples of Spain (PCPE)	211	0.13	+0.03	0	±0
Navarrese Freedom (Ln)	74	0.04	–0.01	0	±0
Blank ballots	1,078	0.64	–0.08		
Total	167,640			4	±0
Valid votes	167,640	99.00	–0.03		
Invalid votes	1,691	1.00	+0.03		
Votes cast / turnout	169,331	66.51	–4.64		
Abstentions	85,248	33.49	+4.64		
Registered voters	254,579				
Sources
Footnotes: ^{1} United We Can results are compared to the combined totals of We Can and United Left–Popular Unity in Common in the 2015 election.

=== 2015 ===
Summary of the 20 December 2015 Congress of Deputies election results in Álava
Parties and alliances	Popular vote			Seats	
Parties and alliances	Votes	%	±pp	Total	+/−
We Can (Podemos/Ahal Dugu)	48,413	27.02	New	1	+1
People's Party (PP)	33,683	18.80	–8.37	1	±0
Basque Nationalist Party (EAJ/PNV)	28,353	15.82	–3.03	1	±0
Socialist Party of the Basque Country–Basque Country Left (PSE–EE (PSOE))	25,331	14.14	–9.29	1	±0
Basque Country Gather (EH Bildu)^{1}	21,225	11.85	–7.30	0	–1
Citizens–Party of the Citizenry (C's)	10,512	5.87	New	0	±0
United Left–Popular Unity in Common (IU–UPeC)	6,814	3.80	–0.28	0	±0
Animalist Party Against Mistreatment of Animals (PACMA)	1,385	0.77	+0.07	0	±0
Union, Progress and Democracy (UPyD)	768	0.43	–2.32	0	±0
Zero Cuts–Green Group (Recortes Cero–GV)	561	0.31	New	0	±0
Blank Seats (EB/AZ)	473	0.26	New	0	±0
Communist Party of the Peoples of Spain (PCPE)	175	0.10	New	0	±0
Welcome (Ongi Etorri)	110	0.06	New	0	±0
Navarrese Freedom (Ln)	82	0.05	New	0	±0
Blank ballots	1,292	0.72	–0.42		
Total	179,177			4	±0
Valid votes	179,177	99.03	+0.62		
Invalid votes	1,764	0.97	–0.62		
Votes cast / turnout	180,941	71.15	+2.49		
Abstentions	73,386	28.85	–2.49		
Registered voters	254,327				
Sources
Footnotes: ^{1} Basque Country Gather results are compared to Amaiur totals in the 2011 election.

=== 2011 ===
Summary of the 20 November 2011 Congress of Deputies election results in Álava
Parties and alliances	Popular vote			Seats	
Parties and alliances	Votes	%	±pp	Total	+/−
People's Party (PP)	46,034	27.17	+0.63	1	±0
Socialist Party of the Basque Country–Basque Country Left (PSE–EE (PSOE))	39,698	23.43	–17.30	1	–1
Amaiur (Amaiur)^{1}	32,439	19.15	+14.33	1	+1
Basque Nationalist Party (EAJ/PNV)	31,931	18.85	+1.10	1	±0
United Left–The Greens: Plural Left (IU–LV)	6,917	4.08	–0.09	0	±0
Union, Progress and Democracy (UPyD)	4,662	2.75	+0.73	0	±0
Equo (Equo)	3,574	2.11	New	0	±0
Animalist Party Against Mistreatment of Animals (PACMA)	1,178	0.70	+0.23	0	±0
For a Fairer World (PUM+J)	778	0.46	+0.07	0	±0
Communist Unification of Spain (UCE)	290	0.17	New	0	±0
Blank ballots	1,924	1.14	–0.38		
Total	169,425			4	±0
Valid votes	169,425	98.41	–0.40		
Invalid votes	2,729	1.59	+0.40		
Votes cast / turnout	172,154	68.66	–0.97		
Abstentions	78,589	31.34	+0.97		
Registered voters	250,743				
Sources
Footnotes: ^{1} Amaiur results are compared to the combined totals of Basque Solidarity and Aralar in the 2008 election.

=== 2008 ===
Summary of the 9 March 2008 Congress of Deputies election results in Álava
Parties and alliances	Popular vote			Seats	
Parties and alliances	Votes	%	±pp	Total	+/−
Socialist Party of the Basque Country–Basque Country Left (PSE–EE (PSOE))	69,479	40.73	+9.94	2	±0
People's Party (PP)	45,276	26.54	–0.33	1	±0
Basque Nationalist Party (EAJ/PNV)	31,983	18.75	–7.08	1	±0
United Left–Greens–Alternative (EB–B)	7,120	4.17	–3.61	0	±0
Basque Solidarity (EA)	5,311	3.11	–1.19	0	±0
Aralar (Aralar)	2,917	1.71	–0.16	0	±0
Union, Progress and Democracy (UPyD)	2,019	1.18	New	0	±0
The Greens (B/LV)	1,080	0.63	New	0	±0
Anti-Bullfighting Party Against Mistreatment of Animals (PACMA)	805	0.47	New	0	±0
For a Fairer World (PUM+J)	662	0.39	New	0	±0
Internationalist Socialist Workers' Party (POSI)	327	0.19	New	0	±0
Communist Party of the Peoples of Spain–Basque Communists (PCPE–EK)	254	0.15	New	0	±0
Engine and Sports Alternative (AMD)	215	0.13	New	0	±0
Citizens–Party of the Citizenry (C's)	161	0.09	New	0	±0
Humanist Party (PH)	159	0.09	–0.47	0	±0
National Democracy (DN)	63	0.04	–0.02	0	±0
Carlist Party of the Basque Country–Carlist Party (EKA–PC)	58	0.03	–0.01	0	±0
Spanish Phalanx of the CNSO (FE de las JONS)	57	0.03	–0.01	0	±0
Spanish Alternative (AES)	29	0.02	New	0	±0
National Alliance (AN)	26	0.02	New	0	±0
Blank ballots	2,588	1.52	+0.08		
Total	170,589			4	±0
Valid votes	170,589	98.81	+3.37		
Invalid votes	2,055	1.19	–3.37		
Votes cast / turnout	172,644	69.63	–7.60		
Abstentions	75,286	30.37	+7.60		
Registered voters	247,930				

=== 2004 ===
Summary of the 14 March 2004 Congress of Deputies election results in Álava
Parties and alliances	Popular vote			Seats	
Parties and alliances	Votes	%	±pp	Total	+/−
Socialist Party of the Basque Country–Basque Country Left (PSE–EE (PSOE))	56,137	30.79	+6.49	2	+1
People's Party (PP)	48,992	26.87	–12.23	1	–1
Basque Nationalist Party (EAJ/PNV)	47,090	25.83	+5.09	1	±0
United Left (EB/IU)	14,181	7.78	+2.17	0	±0
Basque Solidarity (EA)	7,838	4.30	–0.41	0	±0
Aralar–Stand up (Aralar–Zutik)	3,417	1.87	New	0	±0
Humanist Party (PH)	1,021	0.56	+0.19	0	±0
Democratic and Social Centre (CDS)	360	0.20	+0.08	0	±0
Republican Left (IR)	281	0.15	New	0	±0
National Democracy (DN)	110	0.06	New	0	±0
Republican Social Movement (MSR)	103	0.06	New	0	±0
Spanish Phalanx of the CNSO (FE de las JONS)	71	0.04	New	0	±0
Carlist Party of the Basque Country–Carlist Party (EKA–PC)	64	0.04	New	0	±0
The Phalanx (FE)	49	0.03	–0.02	0	±0
Blank ballots	2,626	1.44	–1.61		
Total	182,340			4	±0
Valid votes	182,340	95.44	–3.21		
Invalid votes	8,709	4.56	+3.21		
Votes cast / turnout	191,049	77.23	+6.95		
Abstentions	56,328	22.77	–6.95		
Registered voters	247,377				

=== 2000 ===
Summary of the 12 March 2000 Congress of Deputies election results in Álava
Parties and alliances	Popular vote			Seats	
Parties and alliances	Votes	%	±pp	Total	+/−
People's Party (PP)	66,267	39.10	+11.79	2	±0
Socialist Party of the Basque Country–Basque Country Left (PSE–EE (PSOE))	41,182	24.30	–1.12	1	±0
Basque Nationalist Party (EAJ/PNV)	35,155	20.74	+0.58	1	±0
United Left (EB/IU)	9,509	5.61	–6.06	0	±0
Basque Solidarity (EA)	7,985	4.71	–0.88	0	±0
The Greens (B/LV)	1,880	1.11	+0.65	0	±0
Natural Law Party (PLN)	705	0.42	New	0	±0
Humanist Party (PH)	624	0.37	+0.26	0	±0
Internationalist Socialist Workers' Party (POSI)	372	0.22	New	0	±0
Democratic and Social Centre–Centrist Union (CDS–UC)	206	0.12	–0.01	0	±0
Republican Action (AR)	170	0.10	New	0	±0
Spain 2000 Platform (ES2000)	116	0.07	New	0	±0
The Phalanx (FE)	89	0.05	New	0	±0
Internationalist Struggle (LI (LIT–CI))	65	0.04	New	0	±0
Basque Citizens (EH)^{1}	0	0.00	–7.50	0	±0
Blank ballots	5,163	3.05	+1.56		
Total	169,488			4	±0
Valid votes	169,488	98.65	–0.49		
Invalid votes	2,320	1.35	+0.49		
Votes cast / turnout	171,808	70.28	–2.02		
Abstentions	72,669	29.72	+2.02		
Registered voters	244,477				
Sources
Footnotes: ^{1} Basque Citizens results are compared to Popular Unity totals in the 1996 election. EH called for election boycott and urged its supporters to abstain.

=== 1996 ===
Summary of the 3 March 1996 Congress of Deputies election results in Álava
Parties and alliances	Popular vote			Seats	
Parties and alliances	Votes	%	±pp	Total	+/−
People's Party (PP)	45,731	27.31	+7.75	2	+1
Socialist Party of the Basque Country–Basque Country Left (PSE–EE (PSOE))	42,561	25.42	–0.66	1	–1
Basque Nationalist Party (EAJ/PNV)	33,761	20.16	+3.36	1	±0
United Left (IU/EB)	19,535	11.67	+4.81	0	±0
Popular Unity (HB)	12,552	7.50	–1.88	0	±0
Basque Solidarity (EA)	9,364	5.59	–0.18	0	±0
European Greens–Basque Country Greens (VE–EHB)	774	0.46	–0.67	0	±0
Workers' Revolutionary Party (PRT)	255	0.15	New	0	±0
Centrist Union (UC)	213	0.13	–1.03	0	±0
Humanist Party (PH)	190	0.11	New	0	±0
Revolutionary Workers' Party (POR)	0	0.00	–0.07	0	±0
Blank ballots	2,490	1.49	+0.07		
Total	167,426			4	±0
Valid votes	167,426	99.14	–0.10		
Invalid votes	1,458	0.86	+0.10		
Votes cast / turnout	168,884	72.30	+1.23		
Abstentions	64,688	27.70	–1.23		
Registered voters	233,572				

=== 1993 ===
Summary of the 6 June 1993 Congress of Deputies election results in Álava
Parties and alliances	Popular vote			Seats	
Parties and alliances	Votes	%	±pp	Total	+/−
Socialist Party of the Basque Country–Basque Country Left (PSE–EE (PSOE))^{1}	40,860	26.08	–8.45	2	±0
People's Party (PP)	30,652	19.56	+5.47	1	±0
Basque Nationalist Party (EAJ/PNV)	26,321	16.80	–0.06	1	±0
Alavese Unity (UA)	16,623	10.61	New	0	±0
Popular Unity (HB)	14,702	9.38	–2.24	0	±0
United Left (IU/EB)	10,748	6.86	+3.80	0	±0
Basque Solidarity–Basque Left (EA–EuE)	9,036	5.77	–2.71	0	±0
Democratic and Social Centre (CDS)	1,818	1.16	–5.53	0	±0
The Greens (Berdeak/LV)^{2}	1,775	1.13	+0.45	0	±0
The Ecologists (LE)	1,084	0.69	±0.00	0	±0
Ruiz-Mateos Group–European Democratic Alliance (ARM–ADE)	392	0.25	–1.08	0	±0
Natural Law Party (PLN)	204	0.13	New	0	±0
Coalition for a New Socialist Party (CNPS)^{3}	127	0.08	–0.01	0	±0
Revolutionary Workers' Party (POR)	111	0.07	–0.03	0	±0
Communist Unification of Spain (UCE)	0	0.00	New	0	±0
Blank ballots	2,223	1.42	+0.65		
Total	156,676			4	±0
Valid votes	156,676	99.24	+0.25		
Invalid votes	1,203	0.76	–0.25		
Votes cast / turnout	157,879	71.07	+4.37		
Abstentions	64,273	28.93	–4.37		
Registered voters	222,152				
Sources
Footnotes: ^{1} Socialist Party of the Basque Country–Basque Country Left results are compared to the combined totals of Socialist Party of the Basque Country and Basque Country Left in the 1989 election.; ^{2} The Greens results are compared to Ecologist Party of the Basque Country–Green List totals in the 1989 election.; ^{3} Coalition for a New Socialist Party results are compared to Alliance for the Republic totals in the 1989 election.

=== 1989 ===
Summary of the 29 October 1989 Congress of Deputies election results in Álava
Parties and alliances	Popular vote			Seats	
Parties and alliances	Votes	%	±pp	Total	+/−
Socialist Party of the Basque Country (PSE–PSOE)	35,723	25.92	–7.22	2	±0
Basque Nationalist Party (EAJ/PNV)	23,247	16.86	–2.20	1	±0
People's Party (PP)^{1}	19,427	14.09	–1.73	1	±0
Popular Unity (HB)	16,015	11.62	–0.42	0	±0
Basque Country Left (EE)	11,873	8.61	+0.50	0	±0
Basque Solidarity (EA)	11,689	8.48	New	0	±0
Democratic and Social Centre (CDS)	9,228	6.69	–2.06	0	±0
United Left (IU/EB)	4,219	3.06	+2.21	0	±0
Ruiz-Mateos Group (Ruiz-Mateos)	1,838	1.33	New	0	±0
The Ecologist Greens (LVE)	953	0.69	New	0	±0
Ecologist Party of the Basque Country–Green List (PEE–(LV))	931	0.68	New	0	±0
Workers' Socialist Party (PST)	589	0.43	+0.04	0	±0
Workers' Party of the Basque Country–Basque Country Workers (PTE–EL)^{2}	397	0.29	–0.31	0	±0
Communist Party of the Peoples of Spain (PCPE)	186	0.13	New	0	±0
Revolutionary Workers' Party of Spain (PORE)	136	0.10	New	0	±0
Alliance for the Republic (AxR)^{3}	120	0.09	–0.04	0	±0
Humanist Party (PH)	120	0.09	New	0	±0
Spanish Phalanx of the CNSO (FE–JONS)	96	0.07	New	0	±0
Revolutionary Communist League–Communist Movement (LKI–EMK)^{4}	0	0.00	±0.00	0	±0
Blank ballots	1,059	0.77	+0.05		
Total	137,846			4	±0
Valid votes	137,846	98.99	+0.80		
Invalid votes	1,400	1.01	–0.80		
Votes cast / turnout	139,246	66.70	+3.22		
Abstentions	69,528	33.30	–3.22		
Registered voters	208,774				
Sources
Footnotes: ^{1} People's Party results are compared to People's Coalition totals in the 1986 election.; ^{2} Workers' Party of the Basque Country–Basque Country Workers results are compared to Communist Party of the Basque Country totals in the 1986 election.; ^{3} Alliance for the Republic results are compared to Internationalist Socialist Workers' Party totals in the 1986 election.; ^{4} Revolutionary Communist League–Communist Movement results are compared to the combined totals of Communist Movement of the Basque Country and Revolutionary Communist League in the 1986 election.

=== 1986 ===
Summary of the 22 June 1986 Congress of Deputies election results in Álava
Parties and alliances	Popular vote			Seats	
Parties and alliances	Votes	%	±pp	Total	+/−
Socialist Party of the Basque Country (PSE–PSOE)	45,259	33.14	–2.19	2	±0
Basque Nationalist Party (EAJ/PNV)	26,030	19.06	–2.89	1	±0
People's Coalition (AP–PDP–PL)^{1}	21,600	15.82	–3.31	1	±0
Popular Unity (HB)	16,440	12.04	+2.10	0	±0
Democratic and Social Centre (CDS)	11,951	8.75	+4.92	0	±0
Basque Country Left (EE)	11,081	8.11	+1.15	0	±0
United Left (IU)	1,162	0.85	New	0	±0
Communist Party of the Basque Country (PCE/EPK)	814	0.60	–0.48	0	±0
Workers' Socialist Party (PST)	533	0.39	–0.19	0	±0
Communist Unification of Spain (UCE)	333	0.24	+0.11	0	±0
Republican Popular Unity (UPR)^{2}	193	0.14	+0.05	0	±0
Internationalist Socialist Workers' Party (POSI)	180	0.13	New	0	±0
Revolutionary Communist League (LKI)	0	0.00	±0.00	0	±0
Communist Movement of the Basque Country (EMK)	0	0.00	–0.02	0	±0
Party of the Communists of Catalonia (PCC)	0	0.00	New	0	±0
Blank ballots	986	0.72	+0.15		
Total	136,562			4	±0
Valid votes	136,562	98.19	+0.58		
Invalid votes	2,522	1.81	–0.58		
Votes cast / turnout	139,084	69.92	–11.91		
Abstentions	59,840	30.08	+11.91		
Registered voters	198,924				
Sources
Footnotes: ^{1} People's Coalition results are compared to AP–PDP–PDL–UCD totals in the 1982 election.; ^{2} Republican Popular Unity results are compared to Communist Party of Spain (Marxist–Leninist) totals in the 1982 election.

=== 1982 ===
Summary of the 28 October 1982 Congress of Deputies election results in Álava
Parties and alliances	Popular vote			Seats	
Parties and alliances	Votes	%	±pp	Total	+/−
Socialist Party of the Basque Country (PSE–PSOE)	51,674	35.33	+13.98	2	+1
Basque Nationalist Party (EAJ/PNV)	32,103	21.95	–0.97	1	±0
Democratic Coalition (AP–PDP–PDL–UCD)^{1}	27,974	19.13	–12.46	1	–1
Popular Unity (HB)	14,540	9.94	±0.00	0	±0
Basque Country Left–Left for Socialism (EE)	10,180	6.96	+2.29	0	±0
Democratic and Social Centre (CDS)	5,604	3.83	New	0	±0
Communist Party of the Basque Country (PCE/EPK)	1,573	1.08	–2.25	0	±0
Workers' Socialist Party (PST)	854	0.58	New	0	±0
New Force (FN)^{2}	314	0.21	–0.70	0	±0
Communist Unification of Spain (UCE)	191	0.13	New	0	±0
Communist Unity Candidacy (CUC)^{3}	140	0.10	+0.09	0	±0
Communist Party of Spain (Marxist–Leninist) (PCE (m–l))	138	0.09	New	0	±0
Spanish Solidarity (SE)	132	0.09	New	0	±0
Revolutionary Communist League (LKI)	0	0.00	–0.52	0	±0
Communist League–Internationalist Socialist Workers' Coalition (LC (COSI))	0	0.00	New	0	±0
Communist Movement of the Basque Country (EMK)	0	0.00	–1.07	0	±0
Socialist Party (PS)^{4}	0	0.00	–0.59	0	±0
Blank ballots	834	0.57	+0.16		
Total	146,251			4	±0
Valid votes	146,251	97.61	+0.35		
Invalid votes	3,583	2.39	–0.35		
Votes cast / turnout	149,834	81.83	+12.98		
Abstentions	33,275	18.17	–12.98		
Registered voters	183,109				
Sources
Footnotes: ^{1} AP–PDP–PDL–UCD results are compared to the combined totals of the Foral Union of the Basque Country and Union of the Democratic Centre in the 1979 election.; ^{2} New Force results are compared to National Union totals in the 1979 election.; ^{3} Communist Unity Candidacy results are compared to Workers' Communist Party totals in the 1979 election.; ^{4} Socialist Party results are compared to Spanish Socialist Workers' Party (historical) totals in the 1979 election.

=== 1979 ===
Summary of the 1 March 1979 Congress of Deputies election results in Álava
Parties and alliances	Popular vote			Seats	
Parties and alliances	Votes	%	±pp	Total	+/−
Union of the Democratic Centre (UCD)	29,625	25.41	–5.45	2	±0
Basque Nationalist Party (EAJ/PNV)	26,722	22.92	+5.44	1	±0
Socialist Party of the Basque Country (PSE–PSOE)^{1}	24,891	21.35	–7.57	1	±0
Popular Unity (HB)^{2}	11,594	9.94	+7.72	0	±0
Foral Union of the Basque Country (UFPV)^{3}	7,205	6.18	–0.20	0	±0
Basque Country Left (EE)	5,442	4.67	New	0	±0
Communist Party of the Basque Country (PCE/EPK)	3,877	3.33	+0.19	0	±0
Communist Movement–Organization of Communist Left (MC–OIC)	1,246	1.07	New	0	±0
Workers' Revolutionary Organization (ORT)	1,218	1.04	New	0	±0
National Union (UN)	1,061	0.91	New	0	±0
Carlist Party (PC)	972	0.83	New	0	±0
Party of Labour of Spain (PTE)^{4}	777	0.67	+0.03	0	±0
Spanish Socialist Workers' Party (historical) (PSOEh)^{5}	683	0.59	–2.09	0	±0
Revolutionary Communist League (LCR)	601	0.52	New	0	±0
Proverist Party (PPr)	199	0.17	+0.03	0	±0
Workers' Communist Party (PCT)	7	0.01	New	0	±0
Blank ballots	481	0.41	+0.21		
Total	116,601			4	±0
Valid votes	116,601	97.26	–0.57		
Invalid votes	3,291	2.74	+0.57		
Votes cast / turnout	119,892	68.85	–14.09		
Abstentions	54,253	31.15	+14.09		
Registered voters	174,145				
Sources
Footnotes: ^{1} Socialist Party of the Basque Country results are compared to the combined totals of Socialist Party of the Basque Country and People's Socialist Party–Socialist Unity in the 1977 election.; ^{2} Popular Unity results are compared to Basque Socialist Party totals in the 1977 election.; ^{3} Foral Union of the Basque Country results are compared to People's Alliance totals in the 1977 election.; ^{4} Party of Labour of Spain results are compared to Democratic Left Front totals in the 1977 election.; ^{5} Spanish Socialist Workers' Party (historical) results are compared to Democratic Socialist Alliance totals in the 1977 election.

=== 1977 ===
Summary of the 15 June 1977 Congress of Deputies election results in Álava
Parties and alliances	Popular vote			Seats	
Parties and alliances	Votes	%	±pp	Total	+/−
Union of the Democratic Centre (UCD)	38,338	30.86	n/a	2	n/a
Socialist Party of the Basque Country (PSE–PSOE)	34,244	27.57	n/a	1	n/a
Basque Nationalist Party (EAJ/PNV)	21,708	17.48	n/a	1	n/a
People's Alliance (AP)	7,927	6.38	n/a	0	n/a
Communist Party of the Basque Country (PCE/EPK)	3,906	3.14	n/a	0	n/a
Basque Christian Democracy (DCV)	3,439	2.77	n/a	0	n/a
Democratic Socialist Alliance (ASDCI)	3,324	2.68	n/a	0	n/a
Basque Socialist Party (ESB/PSV)	2,756	2.22	n/a	0	n/a
Independent (INDEP)	2,622	2.11	n/a	0	n/a
Independent (INDEP)	2,347	1.89	n/a	0	n/a
People's Socialist Party–Socialist Unity (PSP–US)	1,677	1.35	n/a	0	n/a
Democratic Left Front (FDI)	791	0.64	n/a	0	n/a
Independent (INDEP)	492	0.40	n/a	0	n/a
Spanish Phalanx of the CNSO (Authentic) (FE–JONS(A))	216	0.17	n/a	0	n/a
Proverist Party (PPr)	180	0.14	n/a	0	n/a
Blank ballots	245	0.20	n/a		
Total	124,212			4	n/a
Valid votes	124,212	97.83	n/a		
Invalid votes	2,756	2.17	n/a		
Votes cast / turnout	126,968	82.94	n/a		
Abstentions	26,112	17.06	n/a		
Registered voters	153,080				

== Bibliography ==
- Ley 1/1977, de 4 de enero, para la Reforma Política (Fundamental Law 1/1977). Official State Gazette (in Spanish). 4 January 1977. BOE-A-1977-165.
- Real Decreto-ley 20/1977, de 18 de marzo, sobre Normas Electorales (Royal Decree-Law 20/1977). Official State Gazette (in Spanish). 18 March 1977. BOE-A-1977-7445.
- Constitución Española (Constitution). Official State Gazette (in Spanish). 27 December 1978. BOE-A-1978-31229.
- Ley Orgánica 5/1985, de 19 de junio, del Régimen Electoral General (Organic Law 5/1985). Official State Gazette (in Spanish). 19 June 1985. BOE-A-1985-11672.
- Carreras de Odriozola, Albert; Tafunell Sambola, Xavier (2005) [1989]. Estadísticas históricas de España, siglos XIX-XX (PDF) (in Spanish). Vol. 1 (II ed.). Bilbao: Fundación BBVA. pp. 1072–1097. ISBN 84-96515-00-1. Archived from the original (PDF) on 24 September 2015.
