= Euskal Iraultzarako Alderdia =

Defunct Basque nationalist political party

Euskal Iraultzarako Alderdia Party of the Basque Revolution
- Secretary-General: Mario Onaindia
- Founded: 2 April 1977
- Dissolved: 1 July 1981
- Newspaper: Herria Zutik
- Youth wing: Eusko Gazteria Abertzalearen Mugimendua (EGAM)
- Paramilitary wing: ETA (pm)
- Ideology: Basque independence Communism; Marxism-Leninism
- Political position: Far-left
- National affiliation: Euskadiko Ezkerra; Navarrese Left Union
- Congreso de los Diputados (1977): 1 / 26 Inside Euskadiko Ezkerra
- Spanish senate (1977): 1 / 16 Inside Euskadiko Ezkerra

Euskal Iraultzarako Alderdia (Party for the Basque Revolution) or EIA was a political party from the Basque Country between 1977 and 1982.

== History ==
The party was founded in April 1977 in Gallarta (Biscay) after the 7th general assembly of ETA, during the Spanish transition to democracy. Its ideology was based on a blend of "independentism" and socialism - originally, they tended to be rather Marxism-Leninism, but subsequently moved towards Eurocommunism.

EIA made a coalition with the Basque section of the Communist Movement of Spain (Movimiento Comunista de España), creating a coalition named Euskadiko Ezkerra. They won a seat in the Spanish Congress of Deputies, occupied by Francisco Letamendia (also known as "Ortzi") and another in the Senate, occupied by Juan María Bandrés. It campaigned for the "no" in the 1978 referendum to approve the Spanish constitution, but in favour of the Basque Statute of Autonomy in the referendum held in 1979. EIA disappeared in 1982, when Euskadiko Ezkerra became a political party.
