= Gorripidea =

Socialist party in the Basque Country

- Leader: Joxe Iriarte Bikila
- Founded: 2012
- Ideology: Anticapitalism; Basque independence Socialism; Ezker abertzalea
- Political position: Radical left
- International affiliation: None

Website
- www.gorripidea.eus

Gorripidea is a Basque political party with a socialist and abertzale ideology, born in 2012 after the dissolution of Zutik (political party created in 1991 by the union of EMK and the LKI).

Founded in March 2009 as an internal current of Zutik, with a more nationalist profile, in 2012 the current transformed itself in a political party due to the dissolution of Zutik in December 2011. In the labour field, its members sympathize with Ezker Sindikalaren Konbergentzia (ESK).

Gorripidea asked to vote for EH Bildu in the elections 2012 Basque elections and for The People's Decide in the 2014 European elections.

On November 29, 2014 the members of the party unanimously agreed to formalize the compatibility of being a member of Gorripidea and the membership of other political organizations. Consequently, in February 2015 dozens of militants were integrated into Alternatiba, including his spokesperson Joxe Iriarte Bikila. Other members of Gorripiedea are involved in Podemos.
