= Amaiur (1979 coalition) =

Amaiur Agrupaciones Electorales de Merindad
- Basque name: Merindadeetako Hautes Elkarteak
- Founded: 1979
- Dissolved: 1983
- Merger of: Herri Batasuna; Euskadiko Mugimendu Komunista; Euskadiko Ezkerra; Independents
- Ideology: Revolutionary socialism Basque nationalism Basque independence Feminism; Antimilitarism; Ecologism; Republicanism
- Political position: Radical Left
- Parliament of Navarre (1979-1983): 7 / 70

Amaiur (Spanish language: Agrupaciones Electorales de Merindad, AMAIUR) was a Navarrese political coalition with a socialist and Basque nationalist ideology formed by the union of Herri Batasuna (HB), Euskadiko Ezkerra (EE) and the Communist Movement of Euskadi (EMK) in 1979, to contest the Navarrese elections of that year. The coalition gained 7 seats in the Parliament of Navarre.
