= 1979 Navarrese foral election =

Election in the Spanish region of Navarre

- 3 April 1979

All 70 seats in the Foral Parliament of Navarre 36 seats needed for a majority
- Registered: 365,080
- Turnout: 258,319 (70.8%)
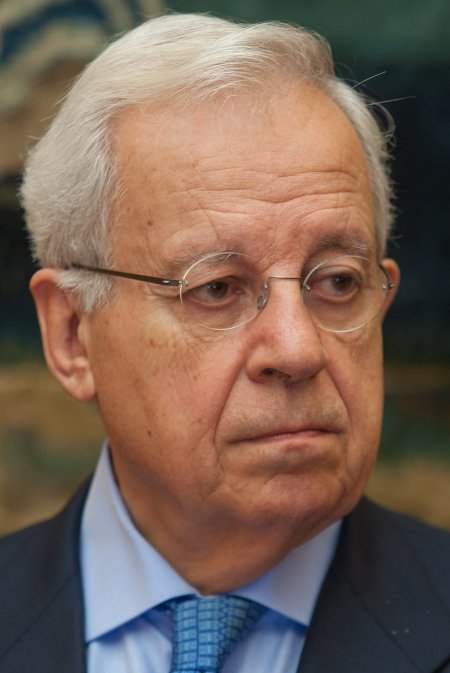

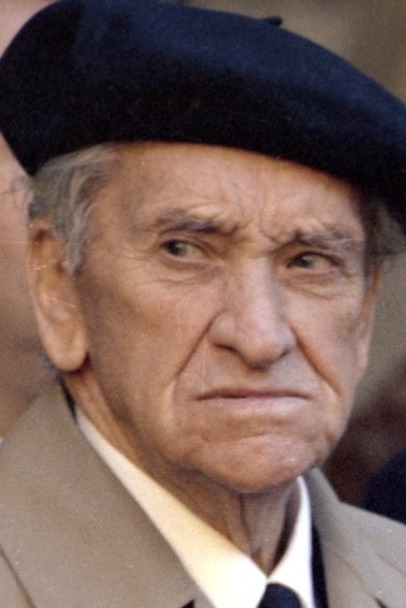
| | First party | Second party | Third party |
|---|---|---|---|
| Leader | Jaime Ignacio del Burgo | Jesús Malón | Jesús Aizpún |
| Party | UCD | PSOE | UPN |
| Leader since | 1979 | 1979 | 3 January 1979 |
| Leader's seat | Pamplona (capital) | Tudela | Pamplona (capital) |
| Seats won | 20 | 15 | 13 |
| Popular vote | 68,040 | 48,289 | 40,764 |
| Percentage | 26.7% | 18.9% | 16.0% |
| | Fourth party | Fifth party | Sixth party |
| Leader | Ángel García de Dios | Jesús Bueno | Manuel de Irujo |
| Party | HB | Amaiur | Basque Nationalists (PNV–EE–ESEI) |
| Leader since | 1979 | 1979 | 1978 |
| Leader's seat | Pamplona (rest) | Sangüesa | Pamplona (capital) |
| Seats won | 9 | 7 | 3 |
| Popular vote | 28,244 | 17,282 | 12,845 |
| Percentage | 11.1% | 6.8% | 5.0% |
President after election
Jaime Ignacio del Burgo
UCD

The 1979 Navarrese foral election was held on 3 April 1979 to elect the Foral Parliament of Navarre. All 70 seats in the Parliament were up for election. It was held concurrently with local elections all throughout Spain.

== Overview ==
=== Electoral system ===
Voting for the Foral Parliament was on the basis of universal suffrage, which comprised all nationals over 18 years of age, registered in Navarre and in full enjoyment of their civil and political rights. The 70 members of the Foral Parliament of Navarre were elected using the D'Hondt method and a closed list proportional representation, with an electoral threshold of five percent of valid votes—which includes blank ballots—being applied in each constituency. Seats were allocated to constituencies, corresponding to the historical merindades of Estella, Pamplona—which was sub-divided into two districts, one comprising the capital and another one for the remaining territory—, Sangüesa, Tafalla–Olite and Tudela, with each being allocated an initial minimum of five seats and the remaining 40 allocated among the constituencies in proportion to their populations (provided that no district was allocated more than 1/3 of the forty seats up for distribution).

The use of the D'Hondt method might result in a higher effective threshold, depending on the district magnitude.

=== Election date ===
The foral election was fixed to be held concurrently with the nationwide 1979 local elections.

== Parties and candidates ==
The electoral law allowed for parties and federations registered in the interior ministry, coalitions and groupings of electors to present lists of candidates. Parties and federations intending to form a coalition ahead of an election were required to inform the relevant Electoral Commission within fifteen days of the election call, whereas groupings of electors needed to secure the signature of at least one-thousandth of the electorate in the constituencies for which they sought election—with a compulsory minimum of 500 signatures—disallowing electors from signing for more than one list of candidates.

Below is a list of the major parties that contested the election:

| Candidacy | Parties and alliances | Leading candidate | Ideology |
|---|---|---|---|
| NV/EJ | List: Basque Nationalist Party (EAJ/PNV); Basque Country Left (EE); Basque Socialist Unity Force (ESEI) | Manuel de Irujo | Basque nationalism Big tent |
| PSE–PSOE | List: Socialist Party of the Basque Country (PSE–PSOE) | Jesús Bueno | Social democracy |
| PCE/EPK | List: Communist Party of the Basque Country (PCE/EPK) | Ángel Pascual Bonis | Eurocommunism; Basque regionalism |
| UCD | List: Union of the Democratic Centre (UCD) | Jesús María Viana | Christian democracy Social democracy Liberalism |
| Amaiur | List: Herri Batasuna (HB); Euskadiko Ezkerra (EE); Communist Movement of Euskadi (EMK) | Jesús Bueno | Basque independence Abertzale left Revolutionary socialism |
| HB (Note: Herri Batasuna only contested elections as itself in the two Pamplona constituencies. It contested as part of Amaiur in others.) | List: People's Socialist Revolutionary Party (HASI); Basque Nationalist Action (EAE/ANV); Patriotic Socialist Committees (ASK) | Ángel García de Dios | Basque independence Abertzale left Revolutionary socialism |
| PC/EKA | List: Carlist Party of Euskal Herria (PC/EKA) | Mariano Zufía Urrizalqui | Basque federalism Christian socialism |
| UNAI | List: Revolutionary Organization of Workers (ORT) | Jesús Casajús Martínez | Communism; Marxism-Leninism |

== Results ==
=== Overall ===
Summary of the 3 April 1979 Foral Parliament of Navarre election results →
| Parties and alliances | Popular vote | | | Seats | |
| Parties and alliances | Votes | % | ±pp | Total | +/− |
|---|---|---|---|---|---|
| Union of the Democratic Centre (UCD) | 68,040 | 26.69 | n/a | 20 | n/a |
| Socialist Party of the Basque Country (PSE-PSOE) | 48,289 | 18.94 | n/a | 15 | n/a |
| Navarrese People's Union (UPN) | 40,764 | 15.99 | n/a | 13 | n/a |
| Popular Unity (HB) | 28,244 | 11.08 | n/a | 9 | n/a |
| Electoral Groups of Merindad (Amaiur) (HB-EE-UMK) | 17,282 | 6.78 | n/a | 7 | n/a |
| Basque Nationalists (PNV–EE–ESEI) | 12,845 | 5.04 | n/a | 3 | n/a |
| Carlist Party (PC) | 12,165 | 4.77 | n/a | 1 | n/a |
| Navarrese Left Union (UNAI) | 7,419 | 2.91 | n/a | 1 | n/a |
| Communist Party of the Basque Country (PCE/EPK) | 6,231 | 2.44 | n/a | 0 | n/a |
| Navarrese Foral Independents (IFN) | 3,729 | 1.46 | n/a | 1 | n/a |
| Left Navarrese Assembly (ANIZ) | 3,725 | 1.46 | n/a | 0 | n/a |
| Left Local Councils Navarrese Association (ANAI) | 3,165 | 1.24 | n/a | 0 | n/a |
| Workers' Party of Spain (PTE) | 1,979 | 0.78 | n/a | 0 | n/a |
| Blank ballots | 1,043 | 0.41 | n/a | | |
| Total | 254,920 | | | 70 | n/a |
| Valid votes | 254,920 | 98.68 | n/a | | |
| Invalid votes | 3,399 | 1.32 | n/a | | |
| Votes cast / turnout | 258,319 | 70.76 | n/a | | |
| Abstentions | 106,761 | 29.24 | n/a | | |
| Registered voters | 365,080 | | | | |

Popular vote
| UCD | 26.69% |
| PSE-PSOE | 18.94% |
| UPN | 15.99% |
| HB | 11.08% |
| Amaiur | 6.78% |
| PNV–EE–ESEI) | 5.04% |
| PC | 4.77% |
| UNAI | 2.91% |
| PCE/EPK | 2.44% |
| IFN | 1.46% |
| ANIZ | 1.46% |
| ANAI | 1.24% |
| PTE | 0.78% |
| Blank ballots | 0.41% |

Seats
| UCD | 28.57% |
| PSE-PSOE | 21.43% |
| UPN | 18.57% |
| HB | 12.86% |
| Amaiur | 10.00% |
| PNV–EE–ESEI | 4.29% |
| PC | 1.43% |
| UNAI | 1.43% |
| IFN | 1.43% |

=== Distribution by constituency ===
| Constituency | UCD | | PSE-PSOE | | UPN | | HB | | Amaiur | | EJ | | PC | | UNAI | | IFN | |
| Constituency | % | S | % | S | % | S | % | S | % | S | % | S | % | S | % | S | % | S |
|---|---|---|---|---|---|---|---|---|---|---|---|---|---|---|---|---|---|---|
| Estella | 30.5 | 3 | 18.3 | 2 | 19.0 | 2 | | | 17.6 | 2 | | | 7.9 | 1 | 2.1 | − | | |
| Pamplona (capital) | 24.6 | 5 | 17.3 | 4 | 15.3 | 3 | 22.4 | 5 | | | 7.8 | 1 | 3.6 | − | | | | |
| Pamplona (rest) | 22.1 | 3 | 13.3 | 2 | 15.0 | 2 | 23.7 | 4 | | | 15.0 | 2 | 4.7 | − | 3.0 | − | | |
| Sangüesa | 21.3 | 2 | 11.3 | 1 | 17.6 | 2 | | | 23.5 | 3 | | | 5.3 | − | 3.8 | − | 14.7 | 1 |
| Tafalla–Olite | 21.3 | 3 | 20.8 | 2 | 17.4 | 2 | | | 19.1 | 2 | | | 5.1 | − | 2.9 | − | | |
| Tudela | 31.8 | 4 | 31.5 | 4 | 14.1 | 2 | | | | | | | 3.9 | − | 8.2 | 1 | | |
| Total | 26.7 | 20 | 18.9 | 15 | 16.0 | 13 | 11.1 | 9 | 6.8 | 7 | 5.0 | 3 | 4.8 | 1 | 2.9 | 1 | 1.5 | 1 |

==== Estella ====
Summary of the 3 April 1979 Foral Parliament of Navarre election results in Estella
| Parties and alliances | Popular vote | | | Seats | |
| Parties and alliances | Votes | % | ±pp | Total | +/− |
|---|---|---|---|---|---|
| Union of the Democratic Centre (UCD) | 11,103 | 30.53 | n/a | 3 | n/a |
| Navarrese People's Union (UPN) | 6,902 | 18.98 | n/a | 2 | n/a |
| Socialist Party of the Basque Country (PSE-PSOE) | 6,670 | 18.34 | n/a | 2 | n/a |
| Electoral Group of Estella Land (AETE) | 6,407 | 17.62 | n/a | 2 | n/a |
| Carlist Party (PC) | 2,861 | 7.87 | n/a | 1 | n/a |
| Communist Party of the Basque Country (PCE/EPK) | 1,407 | 3.87 | n/a | 0 | n/a |
| Navarrese Left Union (UNAI) | 767 | 2.11 | n/a | 0 | n/a |
| Blank ballots | 246 | 0.68 | n/a | | |
| Total | 36,363 | | | 10 | n/a |
| Valid votes | 36,363 | 98.75 | n/a | | |
| Invalid votes | 461 | 1.25 | n/a | | |
| Votes cast / turnout | 36,824 | 74.87 | n/a | | |
| Abstentions | 12,357 | 25.13 | n/a | | |
| Registered voters | 49,181 | | | | |

==== Pamplona (capital) ====
Summary of the 3 April 1979 Foral Parliament of Navarre election results in Pamplona (capital)
| Parties and alliances | Popular vote | | | Seats | |
| Parties and alliances | Votes | % | ±pp | Total | +/− |
|---|---|---|---|---|---|
| Union of the Democratic Centre (UCD) | 19,320 | 24.57 | n/a | 5 | n/a |
| Popular Unity (HB) | 17,606 | 22.39 | n/a | 5 | n/a |
| Socialist Party of the Basque Country (PSE-PSOE) | 13,581 | 17.27 | n/a | 4 | n/a |
| Navarrese People's Union (UPN) | 12,000 | 15.26 | n/a | 3 | n/a |
| Basque Nationalists (PNV–EE–ESEI) | 6,118 | 7.78 | n/a | 1 | n/a |
| Left Navarrese Assembly (ANIZ) | 3,725 | 4.74 | n/a | 0 | n/a |
| Carlist Party (PC) | 2,828 | 3.60 | n/a | 0 | n/a |
| Workers' Party of Spain (PTE) | 1,979 | 2.52 | n/a | 0 | n/a |
| Communist Party of the Basque Country (PCE/EPK) | 1,281 | 1.63 | n/a | 0 | n/a |
| Blank ballots | 208 | 0.26 | n/a | | |
| Total | 78,646 | | | 18 | n/a |
| Valid votes | 78,646 | 98.77 | n/a | | |
| Invalid votes | 982 | 1.23 | n/a | | |
| Votes cast / turnout | 79,628 | 65.54 | n/a | | |
| Abstentions | 41,862 | 34.46 | n/a | | |
| Registered voters | 121,490 | | | | |

==== Pamplona (rest) ====
Summary of the 3 April 1979 Foral Parliament of Navarre election results in Pamplona (rest)
| Parties and alliances | Popular vote | | | Seats | |
| Parties and alliances | Votes | % | ±pp | Total | +/− |
|---|---|---|---|---|---|
| Popular Unity (HB) | 10,638 | 23.71 | n/a | 4 | n/a |
| Union of the Democratic Centre (UCD) | 9,917 | 22.10 | n/a | 3 | n/a |
| Navarrese People's Union (UPN) | 6,728 | 14.99 | n/a | 2 | n/a |
| Basque Nationalists (PNV–EE–ESEI) | 6,727 | 14.99 | n/a | 2 | n/a |
| Socialist Party of the Basque Country (PSE-PSOE) | 5,966 | 13.30 | n/a | 2 | n/a |
| Carlist Party (PC) | 2,127 | 4.74 | n/a | 0 | n/a |
| Navarrese Left Union (UNAI) | 1,360 | 3.03 | n/a | 0 | n/a |
| Communist Party of the Basque Country (PCE/EPK) | 994 | 2.22 | n/a | 0 | n/a |
| Left Local Councils Navarrese Association (ANAI) | 212 | 0.47 | n/a | 0 | n/a |
| Blank ballots | 203 | 0.45 | n/a | | |
| Total | 44,872 | | | 13 | n/a |
| Valid votes | 44,872 | 97.97 | n/a | | |
| Invalid votes | 930 | 2.03 | n/a | | |
| Votes cast / turnout | 45,802 | 68.50 | n/a | | |
| Abstentions | 21,064 | 31.50 | n/a | | |
| Registered voters | 66,866 | | | | |

==== Sangüesa ====
Summary of the 3 April 1979 Foral Parliament of Navarre election results in Sangüesa
| Parties and alliances | Popular vote | | | Seats | |
| Parties and alliances | Votes | % | ±pp | Total | +/− |
|---|---|---|---|---|---|
| Mount Ohry (Orhi Mendi) | 5,954 | 23.50 | n/a | 3 | n/a |
| Union of the Democratic Centre (UCD) | 5,393 | 21.29 | n/a | 2 | n/a |
| Navarrese People's Union (UPN) | 4,467 | 17.63 | n/a | 2 | n/a |
| Navarrese Foral Independents (IFN) | 3,729 | 14.72 | n/a | 1 | n/a |
| Socialist Party of the Basque Country (PSE-PSOE) | 2,852 | 11.26 | n/a | 1 | n/a |
| Carlist Party (PC) | 1,335 | 5.27 | n/a | 0 | n/a |
| Navarrese Left Union (UNAI) | 953 | 3.76 | n/a | 0 | n/a |
| Communist Party of the Basque Country (PCE/EPK) | 459 | 1.81 | n/a | 0 | n/a |
| Left Local Councils Navarrese Association (ANAI) | 117 | 0.46 | n/a | 0 | n/a |
| Blank ballots | 77 | 0.30 | n/a | | |
| Total | 25,336 | | | 9 | n/a |
| Valid votes | 25,336 | 98.67 | n/a | | |
| Invalid votes | 342 | 1.33 | n/a | | |
| Votes cast / turnout | 25,678 | 70.56 | n/a | | |
| Abstentions | 10,715 | 29.44 | n/a | | |
| Registered voters | 36,393 | | | | |

==== Tafalla–Olite ====
Summary of the 3 April 1979 Foral Parliament of Navarre election results in Tafalla–Olite
| Parties and alliances | Popular vote | | | Seats | |
| Parties and alliances | Votes | % | ±pp | Total | +/− |
|---|---|---|---|---|---|
| Union of the Democratic Centre (UCD) | 8,337 | 21.29 | n/a | 3 | n/a |
| Socialist Party of the Basque Country (PSE-PSOE) | 5,344 | 20.78 | n/a | 2 | n/a |
| People's Electoral Group of the Merindad (AEPM) | 4,921 | 19.14 | n/a | 2 | n/a |
| Navarrese People's Union (UPN) | 4,462 | 17.35 | n/a | 2 | n/a |
| Carlist Party (PC) | 1,299 | 5.05 | n/a | 0 | n/a |
| Navarrese Left Union (UNAI) | 746 | 2.90 | n/a | 0 | n/a |
| Communist Party of the Basque Country (PCE/EPK) | 510 | 1.98 | n/a | 0 | n/a |
| Blank ballots | 96 | 0.37 | n/a | | |
| Total | 25,715 | | | 9 | n/a |
| Valid votes | 25,715 | 98.85 | n/a | | |
| Invalid votes | 298 | 1.15 | n/a | | |
| Votes cast / turnout | 26,013 | 79.10 | n/a | | |
| Abstentions | 6,872 | 20.90 | n/a | | |
| Registered voters | 32,885 | | | | |

==== Tudela ====
Summary of the 3 April 1979 Foral Parliament of Navarre election results in Tudela
| Parties and alliances | Popular vote | | | Seats | |
| Parties and alliances | Votes | % | ±pp | Total | +/− |
|---|---|---|---|---|---|
| Union of the Democratic Centre (UCD) | 13,970 | 31.76 | n/a | 4 | n/a |
| Socialist Party of the Basque Country (PSE-PSOE) | 13,876 | 31.54 | n/a | 4 | n/a |
| Navarrese People's Union (UPN) | 6,205 | 14.11 | n/a | 2 | n/a |
| Navarrese Left Union (UNAI) | 3,593 | 8.17 | n/a | 1 | n/a |
| Left Local Councils Navarrese Association (ANAI) | 2,836 | 6.45 | n/a | 0 | n/a |
| Carlist Party (PC) | 1,715 | 3.90 | n/a | 0 | n/a |
| Communist Party of the Basque Country (PCE/EPK) | 1,580 | 3.59 | n/a | 0 | n/a |
| Blank ballots | 213 | 0.48 | n/a | | |
| Total | 43,988 | | | 11 | n/a |
| Valid votes | 43,988 | 99.13 | n/a | | |
| Invalid votes | 386 | 0.87 | n/a | | |
| Votes cast / turnout | 44,374 | 76.16 | n/a | | |
| Abstentions | 13,891 | 23.84 | n/a | | |
| Registered voters | 58,265 | | | | |
