= Left of the Peoples =

Left of the Peoples was the name adopted by various electoral coalitions formed in Spain for elections to the European Parliament. The coalitions were headed by Basque Country Left and Galician Socialist Party–Galician Left:

- Left of the Peoples (1987), in the 1987 election.
- Left of the Peoples (1989), in the 1989 election.
- The Greens–Left of the Peoples, in the 1999 election.
