= ETA political-military =

Majority faction of the armed organization ETA

- Euskadi Ta Askatasuna politiko-militarra
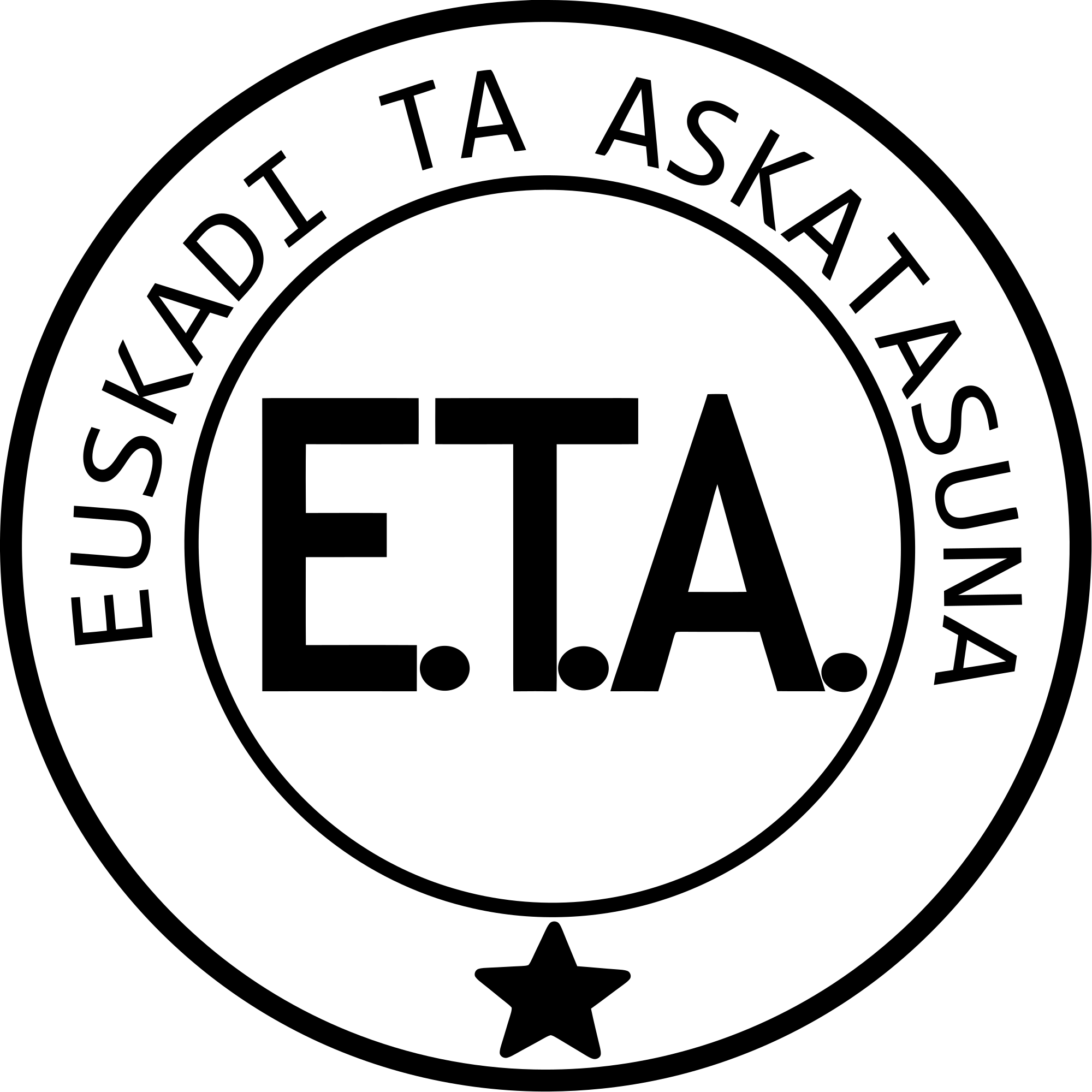
- ETA (pm) symbol
- Other name: poli-milis
- Dates active: 1974 – 1986
- Headquarters: Greater Basque Country
- Active regions: Spain; France
- Ideology: Marxism-Leninism; Basque nationalism Basque independence
- Wars: Basque conflict

ETA political-military (Spanish: ETA político-militar, Basque: ETA politiko-militarra) or ETA (pm) was the majority faction of the Basque revolutionary armed organization ETA who, during Spain's transition to democracy, opted for a double legged structure, political on the one side and military on the other, while ETA militarra or ETA(m) adopted a military-only structure with its constituent divisions detaching into new self-standing organizations (LAB in 1974, etc.).

In the late 1970s, ETA(pm) divided into two groups, with the bulk of the militants siding with the so-called Berezis (the Special Cells). The Berezis merged shortly after with ETA(m), following that the resulting organization became the main branch of ETA and was called from then on ETA(m). Those who stuck to the positions of ETA(pm)'s executive board defended the submission of ETA's violent actions to their political party EIA's needs (founding party of Euskadiko Ezkerra), often economical urges. However, Spanish officials hard pressed on the newly formed party to immediately stop ETA(pm)'s actions or to face up to the consequences.

In the early 1980s, the VII Assembly was held, which sought a way out of armed struggle. ETA(pm) - VII Assembly, through the mediation of its political alter ego, the party Euskadiko Ezkerra (Basque Country's Left), accepted a policy of individual pardons to all members who publicly renounced violence. Many of its former members integrated into Euskadiko Ezkerra, which later fused with the Socialist Party of the Basque Country–Basque Country Left (PSE), the Basque affiliate of the national Spanish Socialist Workers' Party.

Still a small group in ETA (pm) refused to join the VII Assembly and kept the armed activity under the name ETA - VIII Assembly, soon to merge with ETA(m) in 1983.
