= Navarrese Left Union =

Navarrese Left Union Unión Navarra de Izquierdas
- Leader: Javier Erice
- Founded: 1977; 48 years ago
- Dissolved: 1982; 43 years ago
- Merger of: 1977–1978: Euskal Iraultzarako Alderdia (EIA); Euskadiko Mugimendu Komunista (EMK); Organization of Communist Left (OIC-EKE); Revolutionary Organization of Workers (ORT); December 1978–1982: Revolutionary Organization of Workers (ORT)
- Ideology: Basque nationalism Communism; Marxism-Leninism
- Political position: Far-left
- Parliament of Navarre (1979): 1 / 70
- Town councillors (1979): 34 / 1,932

Navarrese Left Union (Spanish: Unión Navarra de Izquierdas), better known by its acronym UNAI was an electoral coalition formed in 1977 to present a list in the first democratic elections in Spain since 1936 in the constituency of Navarre. UNAI was the sister coalition of Euskadiko Ezkerra, that presented lists in Gipuzkoa, Araba and Bizkaia.

== History ==
UNAI was formed by several Basque nationalist and communist parties that had been part of the platform Euskal Erakunde Herritarra. The members of the coalition were Euskal Iraultzarako Alderdia (EIA), Euskadiko Mugimendu Komunista (EMK), the Organization of Communist Left (OIC-EKE) and the Revolutionary Organization of Workers (ORT). UNAI advocated the right of self-determination and the incorporation of Navarre to the Basque Country.

In the general election of July 1977 the head of the list was Javier Erice, who had been mayor of Pamplona for a few months in 1976, until he was dismissed by the civil governor. UNAI brought together the majority of the left-wing Basque nationalist vote in Navarre, obtaining the 9.47% of the total vote and becoming the third political force in the province. Despite this relative success, the 24,489 votes were not enough to gain a deputy in the Constituent Parliament (UCD obtained three deputies and the PSE-PSOE the other two). UNAI also failed to gain representation in the Senate.

UNAI sent Jesus Urra to the commission that prepared the 1977 pre-autonomic agreement; this caused several activists of Euskadiko Ezkerra, that were against supporting any autonomic agreement that didn't include the KAS Alternative, to leave the coalition and join the newly formed Herri Batasuna (HB). UNAI was more affected more by this split than Euskadiko Ezkerra. Also, due to discrepancies over this issue, EMK and EIA left the coalition. Furthermore, in December 1978, the ORT was "expelled" for registering the initials of the coalition. In practice, that meant that only the ORT could use that acronym, and that the rest of parties had been de facto expelled from UNAI.

In the general elections of March 1979, with a fully controlled by the ORT candidacy, the head of the list was José Miguel Ibarrola (secretary general of the Sindicato Unitario). UNAI got 10,970 votes (4.34% of the total), far from obtaining any representation. Meanwhile, OIC-EKE and the EMK had just completed its convergence and presented their own candidacy, that obtained 2,962 votes (1.17% of the total).

In the Navarrese elections of April 1979 UNAI got even poorer results than in the previous election date, with 7,419 votes (2.92%); however, the organization got an MP for the merindad of Tudela, Jesus Casajús. Meanwhile, EIA, this time as Euskadiko Ezkerra also in Navarre, was integrated in different coalitions: Basque Nationalists (with the PNV, Euskal Sozialistak Elkartzeko Indarra and the Party of Labour of Spain) in the merindad of Pamplona and inside Electoral Groups of Merindades (AMAIUR, along with HB and EMK) at Estella, Sangüesa and Olite. In Tudela and Pamplona the EMK promoted other candidates, ANAI and ANIZ, failing to gain any representation. The final results were 1 MP for UNAI, 3 for Basque Nationalists, 7 for AMAIUR and 9 for Herri Batasuna.

Since 1982, when Euskadiko Ezkerra appeared as an official political party, UNAI disappeared from the Navarrese political landscape.
