= Zutik =

Zutik Stand up
- Founded: March 1991
- Dissolved: 11 December 2009
- Merger of: Communist Movement of Euskadi; Liga Komunista Iraultzailea
- Succeeded by: Gorripidea
- Newspaper: Hika
- Youth wing: Hautsi (1991–2000); Zutik Gazteok (2000–2011)
- Ideology: Revolutionary socialism Anti-capitalism; Basque self-determination Feminism; Ecologism; Republicanism
- Political position: Left-wing to far-left
- National affiliation: Euskal Herritarrok (1999–2000)
- International affiliation: European Anti-Capitalist Left

Zutik (English: Stand up) was a political party in Basque Country, Spain which was dissolved in 2009. Zutik was formed in 1991 through the merger of the EMK and LKI—the Basque branch of LCR. Within Zutik, there is a current affiliated to the United Secretariat of the Fourth International. Zutik had a branch in Navarre known as Batzarre.

Zutik members ran once on electoral lists of Euskal Herritarrok (EH); however, in the 2004 Spanish general election, Zutik put an electoral platform together with Aralar. Both were opposing ETA violence.
