= Francisco Letamendia =

Spanish politician (1944–2026)

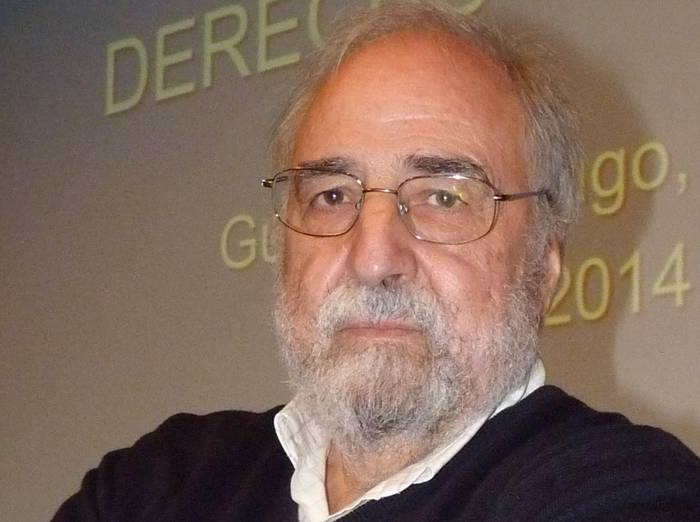
Letamendia in 2014

Francisco Letamendia Belzuntze (5 February 1944 – 26 April 2026) was a Basque politician and lawyer.

== Life and career ==
Letamendia was born in San Sebastián on 5 February 1944. After studying law in Barcelona, he became a lawyer for Basque political prisoners, especially after the Burgos case. In 1971 he published El proceso de Euskadi en Burgos, together with the lawyer Miguel Castells. A year later he went into exile in the Northern Basque Country, from where he moved to Paris. After publishing the work History of the Basque Country: Basque Nationalism and ETA in 1975, he returned to Hego Euskal Herria and published the work The Basques, yesterday, today and tomorrow. In 1977 he was elected deputy in the Cortes for the EE party. He left the ISS and was elected deputy for Bizkaia the following year. In 1982 he went into exile for the second time in Paris due to threats of prosecution (the events of Gernika in 1981). After teaching Basque History at the University of Denis, in 1985 he returned to the Basque Country. After moving away from politics, he was a professor at the University of the Basque Country.

Letamendia died on 26 April 2026, at the age of 82.
