= Euskal Ezkerra =

Basque Left Euskal Ezkerra
- Leader: Xabier Gurrutxaga
- Founded: 1992/1993
- Dissolved: 1994
- Ideology: Basque nationalism Social democracy
- Political position: Left-wing

Euskal Ezkerra (EuE, English: Basque Left) was a political party in Euskadi, Spain. EuE was formed as break-away from Euskadiko Ezkerra in 1993 when EuE merged with Spanish Socialist Workers' Party.

== History ==
Soon after themselves merged with Eusko Alkartasuna, a social-democratic Basque nationalist party, but because of the bad results in the 1993 Spanish general election they broke the coalition and soon afterwards Euskal Ezkerra was dissolved and some of their members continued taking part in other parties. The EuE implosion was, in a way, a precedent for what happened with Basque politics in 1998, when the Pact was launched of Estella and national frontism.
