= Communist Movement of Euskadi =

Communist Movement of Euskadi Euskadi Mugimendu Komunista
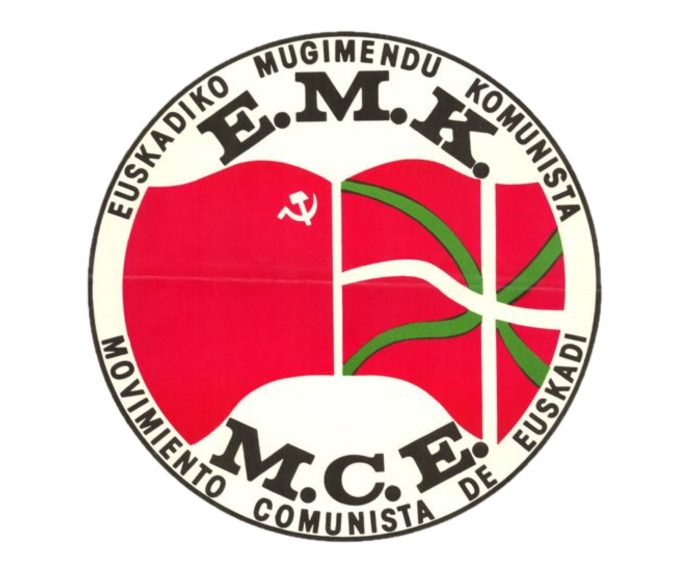
- Leader: Patxi Iturrioz
- Founded: 1966; 59 years ago as ETA-Berri
- Dissolved: 1991; 34 years ago
- Merged into: Zutik; Batzarre
- Newspaper: Zer Egin?
- Youth wing: Kemen
- Ideology: Communism; Marxism-Leninism; Basque nationalism Maoism
- Political position: Far-left
- Congreso de los Diputados (1978-79): 1 / 26 Inside Euskadiko Ezkerra
- Town councillors in the Basque Country (1979): 9 / 3,827

Communist Movement of Euskadi (Basque: Euskadi Mugimendu Komunista, EMK; Spanish: Movimiento Comunista de Euskadi) was originally the branch of the Communist Movement (MC) in Basque Country and Navarre, Spain. EMK was previously known as ETA Berri, a splinter group of ETA. EMK separated itself from MC in 1983. In 1991 EMK merged with LKI (the Basque branch of LCR) and formed Zutik in Basque Country. In Navarre EMK took part in forming Batzarre. Some of its most prominent leaders were Patxi Iturrioz, Eugenio del Río, Rosa Olivares Txertudi, Milagros Rubio, Jesús Urra Bidaurre and the brothers Javier and Ignacio Álvarez Dorronsoro.

== Ideology ==
Although initially influenced by Trotskyism, thriving in Europe after the French May 68, EMK adopted a Maoist ideology, inspired by the Chinese Cultural Revolution, but over the years, specially after 1981-82, EMK gradually abandoned its previous ideologies (Orthodox Marxism, Leninism, Maoism). Active in Navarre and the Basque Autonomous Community, is coordinated at the Spanish level with the Communist Movement (MC), of which EMK was one of the founders.

== History ==
=== First years ===
EMK appeared after a split in ETA, after the workerist sector left the organization, founding ETA Berri. In 1969 ETA Berri changed its name to Komunistak-Movimiento Comunista Vasco, and adopted a maoist political line. In 1972 EMK finally adopted its last name: Euskadi Mugimendu Komunista.

=== 1975–1977 ===
EMK joined in 1975 the Democratic Convergence Platform, a coalition created by much of the opposition, led by the Socialist Party (PSOE), to fight against Francoist Spain. The EMK took an active role in all the riots and protests of the time and in the creation of the modern labor movement and tried, along with other organizations, the establishment of an organization that coordinated all the Basque revolutionary left, which eventually was not totally possible, although the majority of the organizations (including the EMK) created a common platform, the Euskal Erakunde Herritarra (EEH).

=== Transition ===
For the first legislative elections of 1977 EMK made a coalition with Euskal Iraultzarako Alderdia (EIA) called Euskadiko Ezkerra (EE) candidate Patxi Iturrioz took a few months the only parliamentary seat obtained in the elections, following the resignation of Francisco Letamendia Also, in Navarre EMK, EIA, OIC-EKE and ORT formed the electoral coalition Navarrese Left Union (UNAI), that was the third most voted party in Navarre (9.47%), but failed to gain any seat.

UNAI sent Jesús Urra to the commission of the Parliamentary Assembly in 1977, to prepare the autonomic agreement. However, in February 1978 EMK was dissatisfied with the autonomic process, considering it not enough. The same year the Euskadiko Ezkerra sent Juan María Bandrés (only Euskadiko Ezkerra senator) to the Basque General Council (the preautonomic Basque government and the decision of Euskadiko Ezkerra of voting to the candidate of the Basque Nationalist Party (PNV) to the presidency of the council, precipitated the decision of EMK, that left Euskadiko Ezkerra, along with the OIC-EKE (which in 1979 would eventually be integrated in EMK). EMK finally decided to support abstention in the autonomic referendum of 1979. EMK also left UNAI the same year. In the Navarrese elections of the same year EMK failed to gain any seats in the Parliament of Navarre.

=== The 80s and the end of the ideological orthodoxy ===
On April 2, 1983 EMK became independent organizationally from the Communist Movement (MC), to explore new political spaces, which led the organization to support the coalition Auzolan, comprising Liga Komunista Iraultzailea (LKI), LAIA and Nueva Izquierda (Euskadiko Ezkerra split). After the electoral defeat of Auzolan, EMK began a joint campaign with the trotskyist formation LKI, adopting a pro-abertzale speech and asking several times to vote for HB, which has led some historians to believe that the party became a satellite of abertzale coalition. Their campaign posters were known for their humor and the use of pop references to criticize other parties.

During the 80's, EMK decided to support the new social movements that emerged in the early eighties, including the campaign against NATO membership in a referendum in 1986, the movements of insubordination to the military service or the LGBT movement.

=== End ===
In 1991, after several years of collaboration, EMK and LKI decided to merge, resulting in Zutik (in the autonomous community of the Basque Community) and Batzarre (Navarre).

== Bibliography ==
- Bilbao Ariztimuño, Kepa (2006). Crónica de una izquierda singular.
- Díaz Macías, E. M. (2022). El Movimiento Comunista (MC): historia de un partido (1964-1991). Catarata.
- Fernández Rincón, J. (2017). «El origen del Movimiento Comunista de España: Evolución, formación y extensión al ámbito estatal». En Actas del IX Encuentro Internacional de investigadores del Franquismo: 80 años de la Guerra Civil Española (pp. 303-313).
- Fernández Rincón, J. (2018). «Cambio de rumbo en la transición. Claves para entender el desarrollo del movimiento comunista (MC)». En Brumaria (Ed.), Las otras protagonistas de la transición (pp. 1103-1114). Brumaria.
- Fernández Rincón, J. (2019). «La lucha por la democracia en clave antifascista: El Movimiento Comunista (MC) por la ruptura democrática (1975-1977)». En C. Navajas Zubeldia & D. Iturriaga Barco (Eds.), El reinado de Juan Carlos I (1975-2014) (pp. 131-147).
- Fernández Rincón, Javier (2024). El Movimiento Comunista (MC): organización y estrategia revolucionaria (1972-1991) [Tesis doctoral]. Universidad Nacional de Educación a Distancia (España). Enlace.
- Kortazar Billelabeitia, J. (2012a). «El Movimiento Comunista de Euskadi y la Transición en el País Vasco (1975-1980)». En No es país para jóvenes (pp. 97-114). Instituto de Historia Social Valentín Foronda.
- Kortazar Billelabeitia, J. (2012b). «Euskadiko Mugimendu Komunista (1969-1991): Historia eta ideologia». Vasconia: Cuadernos de historia-geografía (38): 1079-1109.
- Laiz Castro, C. (2023). La lucha final: los partidos de la izquierda radical durante la transición española. Catarata.
- Pérez Ochoa, Í., & Satrustegi Andres, I. (2020). «UNAI: Auge y fracaso de la izquierda revolucionaria en Navarra». Príncipe de Viana (277): 669-695. Enlace.
- Satrustegi Andres, I. (2018). «La izquierda revolucionaria vasca bajo el franquismo: el ejemplo del MCE». En Las otras protagonistas de la transición (pp. 1087-1102). Brumaria. Enlace.
- Satrustegi Andres, I. (2022a). «Dazibaos en la Estafeta: el maoísmo en Navarra en los años 1970». Gerónimo de Uztariz (36): 47-68. DOI: 10.58504/rgu.36.4..
- Satrustegi Andres, I. (2022b). «"Hicimos lo que había que hacer": la transición en Navarra desde abajo». En R. Jimeno Aranguren (Ed.), La LORAFNA 40 años después (pp. 103-124). Aranzadi. Enlace.
- Satrustegi Andres, I. (2022c). Beste mundu bat nahi genuen: Nafarroako ezker iraultzailea, 1970-1979. Gobierno de Navarra.
- Satrustegi Andres, I. (2025). Atreverse a luchar. La izquierda revolucionaria y la Transición en Navarra. Txalaparta.
- Wilhelmi Casanova, G. (2016). Romper el consenso: La izquierda radical en la Transición (1975-1982). Siglo XXI.
- Merino, Javier (2009). «El espejismo revolucionario: la izquierda radical ante ETA», Cuadernos Bakeaz, núm. 94.
