= Euskadiko Ezkerra =

Defunct socialist party in the Basque Country

- General Secretary: Mario Onaindia (1982-1985); Kepa Aulestia (1985-1991); Jon Larrinaga (1991-1993)
- Founded: 1977 (coalition); March 1982 (party)
- Dissolved: March 1993
- Merger of: Euskal Iraultzarako Alderdia; UKE (majority faction)
- Merged into: PSE-EE; Euskal Ezkerra (minority)
- Ideology: Basque nationalism Left-wing nationalism Pacifism; 1977-1982: Marxism; Revolutionary socialism 1980s: Eurocommunism; Abertzale left Later: Democratic socialism Social democracy
- Political position: 1977-1982: Far-left; 1980s: Left-wing; Later: Centre-left to left-wing
- European affiliation: Left of the Peoples (1987-1993); The Green Group
- Colours: Green

Euskadiko Ezkerra (EE; English: Basque Country Left) was a Basque left-wing nationalist political organisation. It was born as an alliance of various parties of the Basque left, out of an initiative of ETA political-military, but not led by the organisation. It parted ways with the group when it was established as a political party in 1982. EE followed a pacifist line, negotiating deals between Basque nationalist forces and the Spanish government. It moderated to become a democratic socialist and social-democratic party in the governing coalition of the Basque Country, and also contested elections in Navarre. Faced with competition and growing debts, the party folded into the Basque branch of PSOE to form PSE-EE in 1993.

== History ==
It was founded as a coalition of Euskal Iraultzarako Alderdia (EIA, Basque Party for Revolution or Party for Basque Revolution) and other Basque Marxist forces in 1977 to present lists for the Spanish general elections in the constituencies of Biscay, Gipuzkoa and Álava, while Navarrese Left Union (UNAI), an allied coalition, was to present a list in the constituency of Navarre.

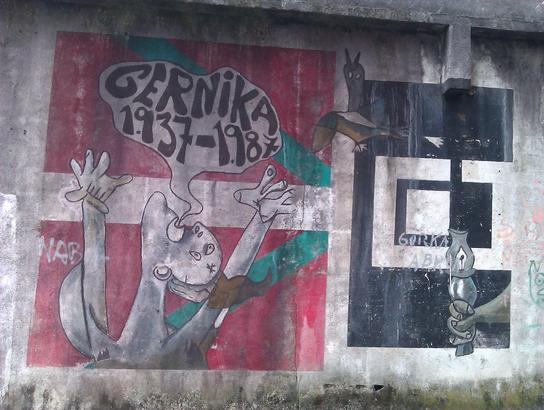
Mural painted at Gernika in 1987, commemorating the bombing of Gernika.

EE's list in Gipuzkoa won one seat in the Spanish Congress for Francisco Letamendia, one in the Senate for Juan María Bandrés, a lawyer for ETA members, and none in the other constituencies. Many prominent members of EE eventually separated from the coalition and integrated into Herri Batasuna (HB). EE called for "no" in the Referendum for Spanish Constitution in 1978.

Their initial logo had half an ikurriña (Basque flag) in the left side, and two white and black capital E's in the right side.

Several of the members of ETA (pm) joined peaceful political action in EE after they abandoned violence and negotiated pardons from the Spanish government.

In 1982, it merged with a majority faction of PCE-EPK (the Basque branch of PCE) and became a party under the name EE-IPS, Euskadiko Ezkerra-Izquierda para el Socialismo ("Left for Socialism"), while often using the simpler name Euskadiko Ezkerra. Its general secretary in this period was Mario Onaindia, a former ETA member during the Franco era, later replaced by Kepa Aulestia.

The EE party defined itself as "abertzale socialist". Within the party, there were members with differing views on Basque nationalism, radical socialists and social democrats, and members of both Basque and non-Basque heritage.

EE called for a "no" on the membership of Spain in NATO in the referendum held in 1986. While the "yes" vote won nationally, the "no" campaign triumphed in the Basque Autonomous Community.

After the split of the Basque Nationalist Party (PNV) and the creation of Eusko Alkartasuna (EA) in 1987, EE established several coalitions with the latter. PSOE rejected a cooperation plan with EA and EE.

In the leadup to the 1990 Basque regional election, United Left–Greens approached EE for an alliance, which was refused. EE only obtained six seats in that election, their worst showing to date. The party entered the new coalition with both PNV and EA.

In 1993, a majority of party affiliates approved a merger with Socialist Party of the Basque Country (PSE), the branch of the Spanish Socialist Workers' Party (PSOE) for the Basque Autonomous Community. The resulting party is the current PSE-EE. The merger was called a 'purchase' by some members, as EE had accumulated around Pts800,000,000 (€4,800,000) worth of debt, rendering their continued existence unviable.

However, a section of Euskadiko Ezkerra disagreed with the PSE merger, and, since the Euskadiko Ezkerra name was retained by the majority of members who approved the merger with the PSE, the remaining faction went on to create a new party, Euskal Ezkerra (EuE, Basque Left) which, in turn, merged soon after with Eusko Alkartasuna.
