= José María Zavala Castella =

Spanish politician (1924–1992)

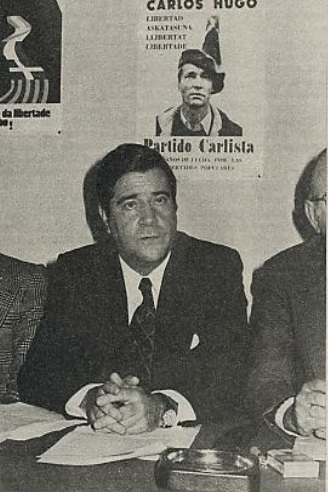
- Born: 1924; Guadalajara, Spain
- Died: 1992 (aged 67–68); Madrid, Spain
- Occupation: insurance employee
- Known for: politician
- Political party: Carlism

José María Zavala Castella (1924–1992) was a Spanish politician, active in particular during late Francoism and during transition to democracy. In 1966–1979 he was Secretary General to mainstream Carlist organizations, first Comunión Tradicionalista and since 1971 Partido Carlista. In historiography he is presented as the chief architect of an attempt to transform Carlism from a far-right traditionalist movement into a far-left radical socialist party.

== Family and youth ==
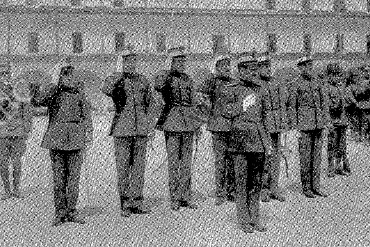
Spanish military pharmacists taking oath, around 1917

The Zavala family originated from Gipuzkoa. The one who brought it to prominence was Domíngo de Zavala y Martínez de Arremendía; he commanded Spanish warships, took part in the Battle of Lepanto, rose to contador of Felipe II and in the late 16th century set up a landholding, which became the family nest for generations to come. The Zavalas got very branched; some lines provided many officials and military commanders. One source suggests that José María descended from Juan de Zavala y de la Puente, very briefly the prime minister of the First Republic in 1874, but the information is not confirmed elsewhere and genealogical data hardly match. It is not clear what was the branch José Mariá's father, Miguel Zavala Lara (1883–1973) descended from. He was born in the Andalusian town of Bailén (Jaén province), yet nothing is known of his family. He also opted for the military career, though in its medical branch; in 1911 he graduated as farmacéutico segundo and was posted to the garrison of Vitoria.

In 1915 Zavala Lara married Concepción Castella y García Duarte (1889–1966), an Andalusian girl from Baena (Cordoba province); she was daughter to an established bourgeoisie family and granddaughter to Eduardo García-Duarte, professor of medicine and rector of the Granada University. The couple shuttled across Spain and Morocco following military assignments of Zavala Lara, including Larache (1916), Seville (1920), Granada (1922), Guadalajara (1923), again Seville (1929), again Larache (1932), Canary Islands (1932) and Burgos (1935). Zavala Lara rose to the rank of farmacéutico mayor. When he retired in 1939, his wife became sort of a public figure. In 1936–1950 and as Concepción Castella de Zavala she published some 15 novels; currently viewed as second-rate literature, they combined action and romance with praise of traditional values and patriotic virtues.

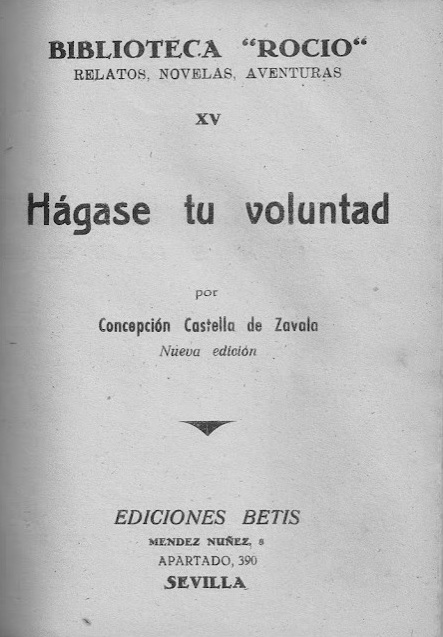
novel by mother, 1937

The couple had 6 children, all of them sons, born between the mid-1910s and the mid-1920s; José María was the youngest one. Born when his father served in Guadalajara, he commenced schooling during his parents' spell in Tenerife and then in Burgos, in both cases in schools run by the religious. At outbreak of the civil war the family lived in Burgos; at least one older brother volunteered to Carlist troops. In 1937 as a 13-year-old José María escaped from home and also joined a Navarrese requeté unit; no details are available. In the 1940s he lived with his parents in Madrid and having completed school education he commenced work in an unspecified insurance company. In parallel, he pursued evening studies in law, but it is not clear if and when he graduated. In 1949 he married Maruja Díaz García-Moreno; nothing is known of her or of her family. They had one child, Jesús Zavala Díaz; neither he nor his descendants became public figures. The best known Zavala's relative was his older brother Juan Zavala Castella, a career officer; moderately known as military historian and Carlist propagandist, during late Francoism he became director general de prisiones.

== Early Carlist engagements (until mid-1950s) ==
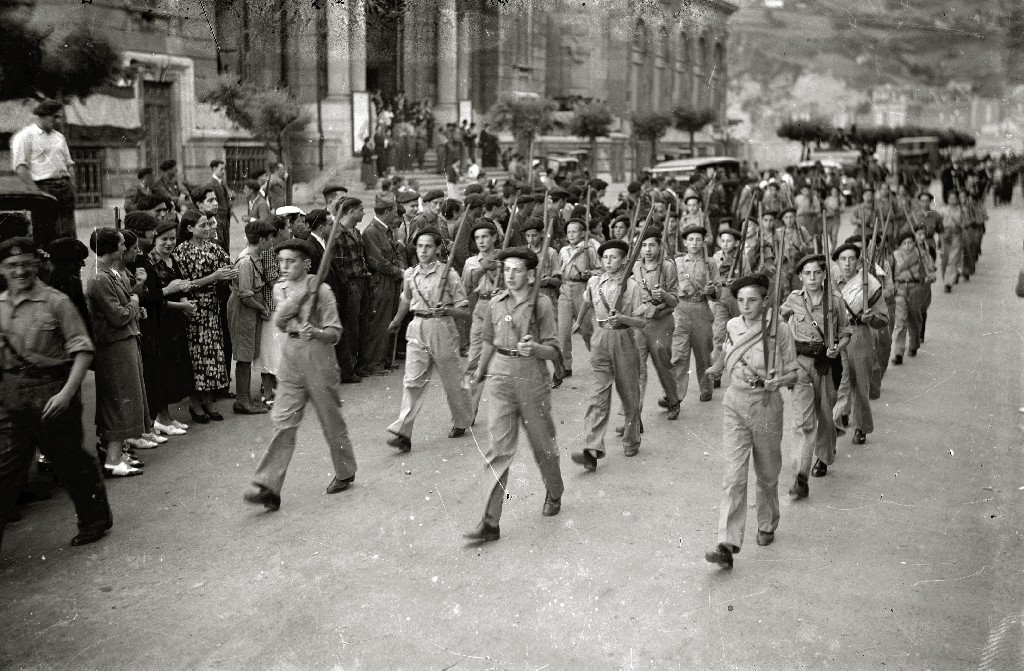
uniformed Carlist adolescents, 1937

Both Zavala's parents were Carlists. Because of political preferences his father faced some problems in the army, while his mother strongly flavored her novels with the Traditionalist spirit; some authors note that he was "descendiente de familia de pura reigambre carlista". His older brothers as teenagers engaged in para-political propaganda in the mid-1930s, and at least one volunteered to requeté in 1936. As a young teenager José María inherited the Traditionalist outlook, which triggered the episode of his escape from home and joining Carlist militia in 1937, though some much later accounts played down his zeal and presented him as one of "jóvenes atrapados en las contradicciones y los horrores de la guerra". It is not clear how long his frontline episode lasted; in late 1937 he was noted as member of the Burgos branch of Agrupación Escolar Tradicionalista. During the early post-war years of the 1940s he remained influenced by his brother, ex-requeté Juan, who developed a strong anti-Francoist knack; it is not clear whether in his late teens José María used to join Juan when staging impromptu demonstrations against the regime. When getting married in 1949, he was godparented by the then Carlist national political leader, Manuel Fal Conde.

In the early 1950s Zavala retained membership in requeté, though its nature is not clear. At the time he joined the group of young Madrid Carlist students active in semi-legal Agrupación Escolar Tradicionalista and frequenting so-called Academia Vázquez de Mella, a Carlist self-education platform, though he did not attend the classes himself. Led by Ramón Massó, the group included the likes of Ignació Ipiña, Víctor Perea, Pedro and Ignacio Echevarría, Fernando Truyols, Ángel Romera, José Antonio Parilla, Pedro and Luis Olazábal, and others. They were critical as to what they perceived somnabulic Carlist structures, and they also remained somewhat skeptical as to grand Traditionalist theories developed by pundits like Gambra or Elías de Tejada; they were principally interested in action.

Carlist standard

In the mid-1950s the Massó-led group, including Zavala, focused their attention on the young prince Hugues de Borbón-Parma, son of the Carlist regent-claimant Don Javier. Following initial talks the prince agreed to throw himself into Spanish politics, though there were debates about the strategy to be adopted. Some thought that he should build his position beyond lethargic Carlist structures and offer some sort of alternative; Zavala was among these who argued that the prince should act from the inside, "within the old Comunión, of which he was a natural leader, and transform it". This stand has eventually prevailed. Some authors claim that as early as in 1955 Zavala entered the personal Secretaría Política of prince Hugues, a platform to formalize the group of his advisors. Later he labored to prepare Hugues’ entry into Spanish politics, and some authors even claim that he headed the group. The entry materialized as a fulminant Hugues’ appearance at the 1957 rally at Montejurra.

== Ascendance to power (1957–1965) ==
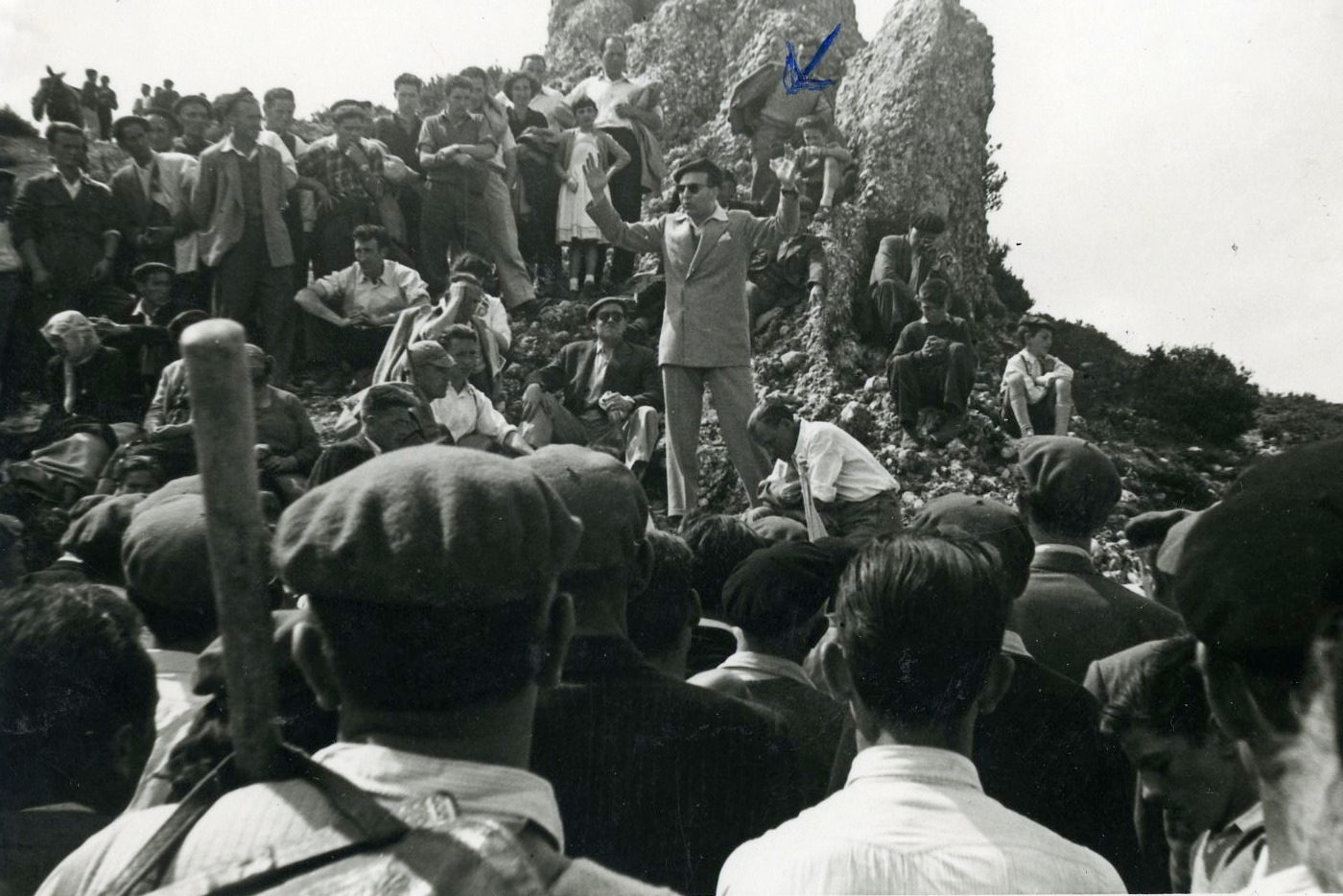
Carlist rally, mid-1950s

At the turn of the decades the Massó-led Secretaría was gradually making inroads into the Carlist organisation. Some authors almost ignore Zavala in their accounts of this period. Some claim that there were already some cracks within the group, as Massó remained linked to traditionalism, while Zavala represented “sector popular” or those who “bebían en las fuentes populares”. Some scholars do not see any differences, and see the group as a coherent contingent bent on reforming Carlism along proto-socialist lines. Its importance changed from a minor faction into an influential, well-organized team when the prince, now assuming the name of Carlos Hugo, settled in Madrid in the early 1960s. 1961 marked Zavala’s “bautismo de guerra política”.

In 1962 the Secretaría was enlarged; within its internal division of labor Zavala focused on organisation matters. Moreover, the same year he became a secretary of the newly created Hermandad de Antiguos Combatientes de Requetés, an ex-combatant organisation allowed by the regime. Still in 1962 Zavala entered Consejo Nacional, a largely consultative body freshly created within the Carlist structures. New roles gave the Massó-led group, the men mostly in their 30s, new locus standi in the organisation; they took advantage of it e.g. by touring regional branches and winning allies.

The secretarios were increasingly under fire from some Traditionalists, who suspected them of subversive ideas. However, the so-called camarilla counter-attacked using loyalty to the prince and the dynasty as the lever; the campaign resulted in ousting the chief opponent, Zamanillo, in 1963. The same year produced a wave of personal changes in technical and apparently minor positions in the organisation; Zavala became a liaison officer between the party executive and the France-based Don Javier. Massó later described it as "golpe de mano fulminante". In terms of political course the group remained ambiguous. On the one hand, in 1964 they sought understanding with Movimiento and approached Solís for Cortes nominations to Massó, Zavala and Echevarría. On the other, the same year the Madrid AET guided by Zavala published Esquema doctrinal, a Q&A-format doctrinal lecture which advanced a blend of monarchism and Marxism.

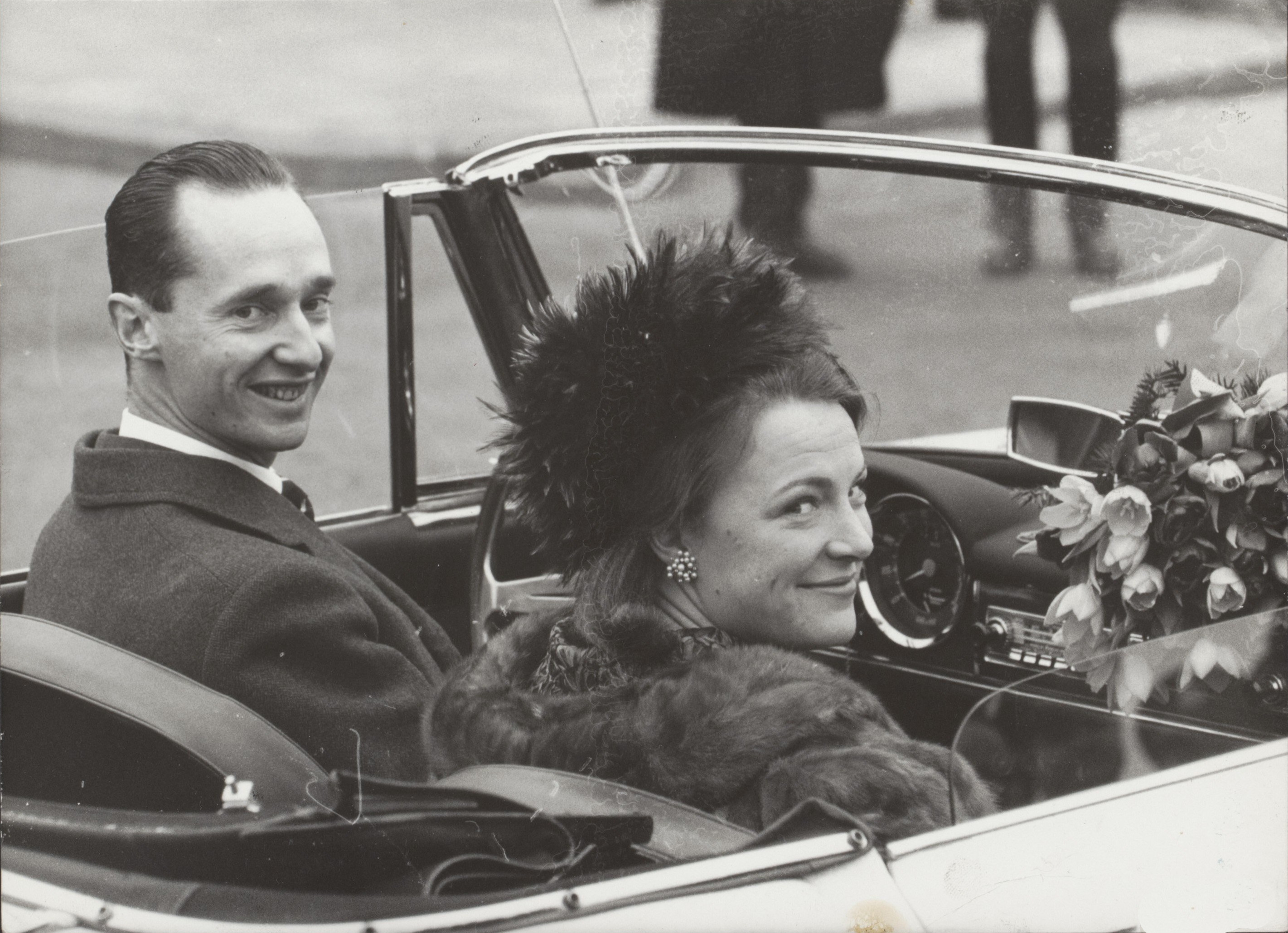
Don Carlos Hugo with wife, 1964

In the mid-1960 Carlos Hugo was already playing a key role in Carlist politics. Guided by Massó and Zavala, in 1965 he dissolved old governing structures and nominated new Junta de Gobierno, theoretically the key party executive, composed either of traditionalists or fence-sitters. However, in an array of auxiliary bodies he set up also Secretaría Técnica, headed by Zavala. Formally a technical body intended to run the daily party business, in the increasingly diluted governing structure it turned into the nucleus of power within the organisation, the unit which controlled nominations, agendas, meetings and finances. Scholars note that at this point Zavala effectively became the key man behind the party machinery. Even José María Valiente, Jefé Delegado and as such nominally the political leader of the organisation, acknowledged the change and in matters of internal policy delegated to Zavala. Some historians claim that 1965 marked the real "golpe de mano" within Carlism.

== Power-sharing with Valiente (1965–1968) ==
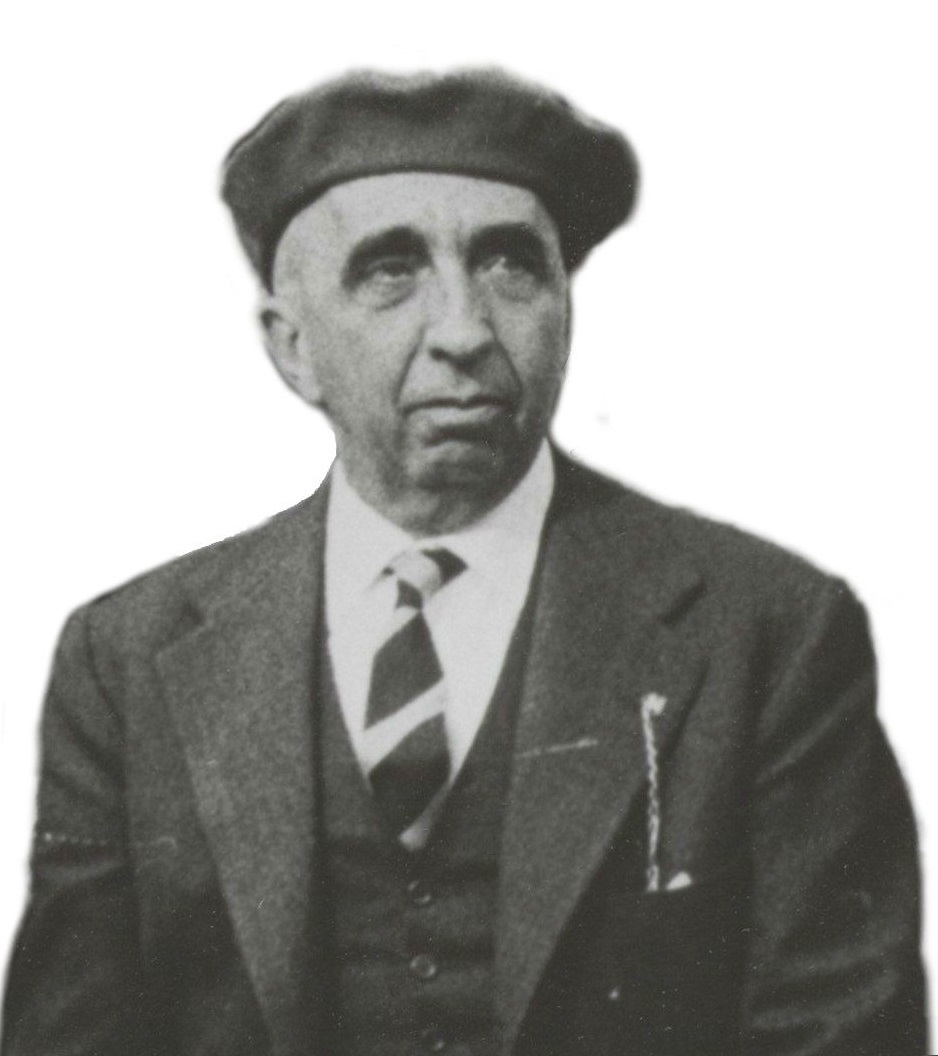
Valiente

The mid-1960s produced a break within the former secretarios. Massó concluded that the campaign to get Carlos Hugo nominated by Franco as the future king was lost and decided to withdraw from politics; he agreed to stay only temporarily. Zavala was determined to go on, fearing that otherwise Don Juan Carlos would ascend to the throne. With 1965 Massó's move to Pamplona, Zavala was left sharing power only with the nominal party leader, Valiente. There are historians who maintain that the Zavala-led part of the camarilla have already abandoned the monarchic bid and concluded that their best policy was "to try to carry the Carlist majority with them by accelerating the pace of ideological change". Others claim to the contrary, namely that following sidetracking of Massó, Zavala "continued along the same line" as "el nuevo hombre fuerte del partido". The rift was completed two years later, when during an obscure episode related to scandal of allegedly Massó's letter, the latter and most former secretarios abandoned Carlism.

In 1966 the claimant authorized another restructuring of command layer and created Junta de Gobierno with Zavala as its member. National commands of AET, Requeté, Margaritas and MOT were dissolved, and specialized branches got fragmented into provincial organisations. Some historians think it a move which eliminated dissent. Moreover, Secretaría Técnica was replaced with Secretaría General, headed by Zavala. It had even more powers, e.g. Zavala single-handedly nominated the entire regional Navarrese executive; in case of most regional appointments he acted carefully, and tried not to trigger all-out war against the traditionalist orthodoxes. He continued the policy of cautious collaboration with the regime. In 1967 he labored to get the Carlists he considered allies or at least useful into the Cortes as so-called procuradores familiares; he also talked to the Movimiento leaders, hoping for seats in its Consejo Nacional. The campaign bore no fruit.

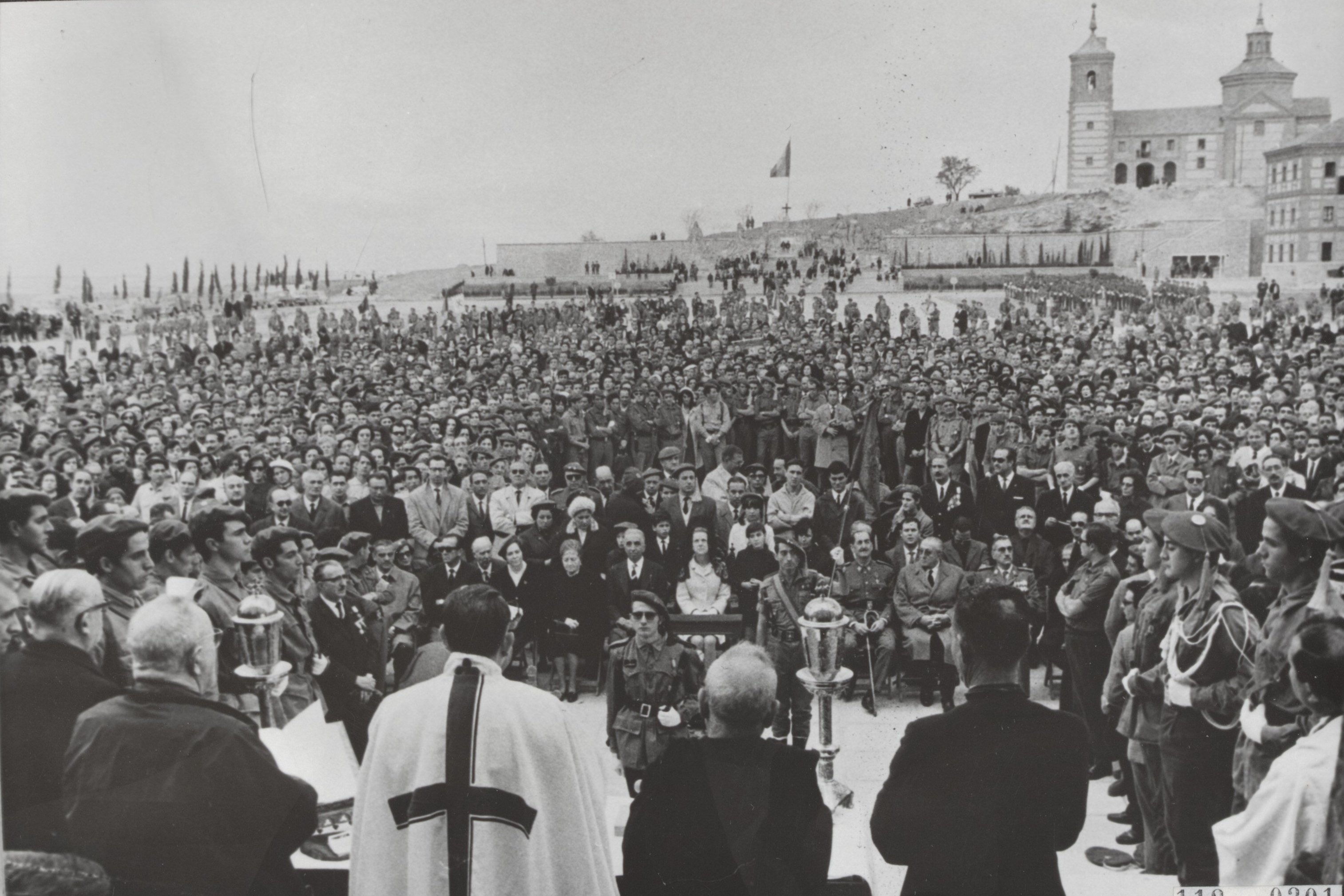
Carlist rally at Cerro de los Ángeles near Madrid, 1966

Opposition against Zavala was on the rise. Some local organisations were abandoned by orthodoxes discouraged by new progressist course, electoral campaigns produced protests against his dictatorial leadership, and recognized personalities published statements naming him the new Maroto, a traitor to the cause. Calls to oust him were backed by charges of financial irregularities. He faced opposition also from the left, e.g. in 1967 the Madrid AET organisation abandoned Carlism as not sufficiently democratic. Zavala responded by massive questionnaire campaign, which reportedly confirmed support for the left-wing turn. He faced little challenge from Junta de Gobierno, composed mostly of elderly people; increasingly bewildered, they stuck to loyalty to the dynasty as their last-resort guideline. The senile claimant was hardly contactable, while his son Carlos Hugo turned Zavala's greatest ally. Conflicts between Zavala and the official party leader Valiente were mounting, but the latter was increasingly tired. Eventually he managed to get his resignation accepted; it was made public in 1968. There was no new jefé delegado appointed; instead, the claimant formed a collegial executive headed by Juan José Palomino.

== Power-sharing with Palomino (1968–1971) ==
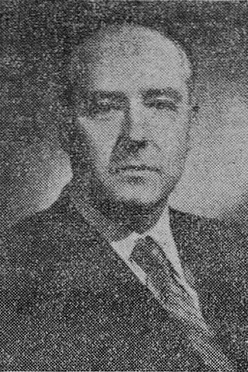
Palomino

During the previous 4 years Zavala as Secretario Técnico/General was co-signing key party documents with Valiente; now he was co-signing with Palomino, though at times he was making statements himself on behalf of the Junta Suprema. Some historians suggest that the 73-year-old Palomino was either acquiescent or disoriented, others count him among promoters of the new left-wing course; most agree that in fact, power was left in hands of Zavala and Carlos Hugo. With a myriad of bodies forming the party high command, Zavala was the only one in full decision-making capacity. At the turn of the decades he formed a group of collaborators, usually in their 30s or 20s, composed of José Carlos Clemente, Pedro José Zabala, Evaristo Olcina Jiménez, Arturo Juncosa Carbonell, Laura Pastor Collado and others, dubbed "edecanes", "staff", "aparato" or "camarilla".

The year of 1968 marked a fundamental change in Carlist stand versus Francoism; with expulsion of Carlos Hugo from Spain the policy of cautiously courting the regime crashed, and from this moment the party adopted an openly hostile and increasingly radical left-wing course. The same year Zavala launched a campaign of cursillos, party-organized classes supposed to educate a new generation of leaders; they advanced socially radical message which combined Marxism, gauchisme and monarchism. The courses were parallel to launch of Información Mensual, a semi-legal bulletin which Zavala personally edited until the late 1970s; other formative and radically left-wing bulletins were cured by his collaborators. The official monthly Montejurra was closed by the authorities in 1971, as its openly anti-Francoist course was considered off-limits by censorship. However, there were limits to radicalization; Zavala condemned the activity of GAC, a terrorist Carlist group which emerged beyond the official party structures.

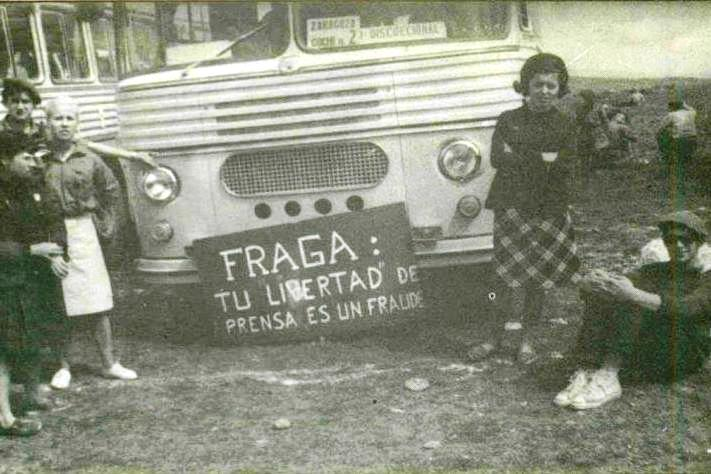
Montejurra attendants on their way to Estella, late 1960s

As Secretario General Zavala took part in numerous public rallies and events; he attended the gatherings at Montejurra and Montserrat, toured Spain with the Borbón-Parmas and participated in gatherings of regional Carlist executive bodies. He was awarded Cruz de la Legitimidad Proscrita and was present abroad during events related to the dynasty, be it in Portugal or in France. He was no longer a grey eminence: in name of the party he was giving press conferences and since 1970 he was delivering key addresses during the prime annual Carlist event, the Montejurra celebration. As the authorities started to prohibit openly anti-regime meetings he tried to dodge the ban and fearing detention, for some time went into hiding. When in 1971 Palomino was dismissed, Zavala formally was the third in command of Comunión Tradicionalista. Until 1971, when following internal coup the traditionalists regained control of Hermandad de Antiguos Combatientes de Requetés, he was also the secretary of the organisation.

== Politician for the future (1971–1975) ==
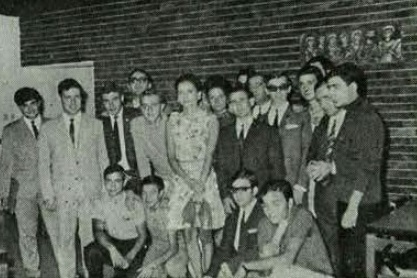
cursillo attendants

At the turn of the decades Zavala became a chief engineer of a maneuver intended to transform the movement into a modern, fighting mass party, founded on the principles of socialism, self-management and federalism. Formally the objective was achieved during gatherings styled as I. and II. Congreso del Pueblo Carlista, staged in southern France respectively in 1970 and 1971. The second of them produced transformation into Partido Carlista, formally presided by Carlos Hugo; Zavala was elected as general secretary with great powers and he immediately proceeded to enforce the radical socialist course across all local Carlist jefaturas in Spain, demanding that these doubting the change step aside and make room for the new generation. The campaign of cursillos continued, though as the authorities cracked down on openly subversive activities, they were moved to southern France; Zavala kept supervising them. In 1972 he supervised the launch of Federación Obrera Socialista, a Partido-Carlista-parented workers' organization.

On the internal front Zavala was almost fully in control; entirely supported by Carlos Hugo, he enlarged his internal team with a group of 20-year-olds like Carlos Carnicero or José Manuel Sabater, but also with 50-year-olds like Mariano Zufía. Traditionalist opposition in the party was reduced to a relatively small group of older veterans, some of them quite prestigious; trapped between bewilderment and fatigue they sort of complied but eventually resolved to campaign of open letters, intended to bypass Zavala and address the Borbón-Parmas. Ignored, most of them withdrew in 1974–1975. In rare cases of a rally going off track, like during the 1974 Montejurra, he intervened personally. Zavala claimed that the young, reinvigorated party was attracting new militants, with new círculos opened across the country. On the external front the strategy was to get visibility by seizing public posts, especially Cortes seats reserved for deputies elected in so-called tercio familiar. However, the strategy backfired as heavy-handed leadership and ideological zeal produced resignation of few party-aligned procuradores, like Auxilio Goñi and José Angel Zubiaur.

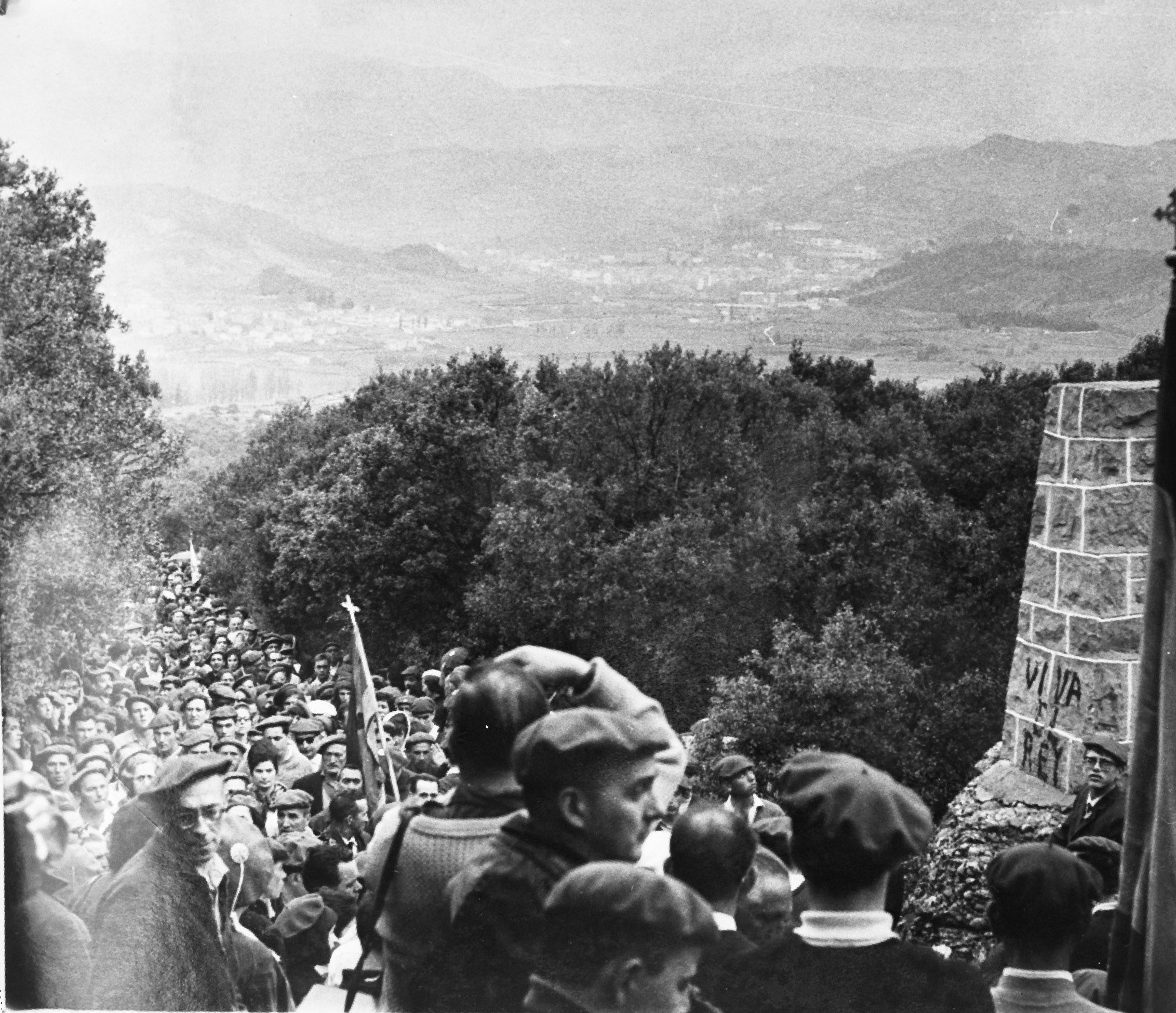
Montejurra ascent, 1973

During the very last years of Francoism Zavala was approaching other radically left-wing groupings. Though as late as in 1972 he conferred in Vienna with Bruno Kreisky and leaders of the Austrian social-democratic party, in 1973 he was already seeking understanding with Partido Comunista Español; local Partido Carlista cells maintained clandestine contacts with PCE units, and Zavala himself for hours conferred with Santiago Carillo in Paris. In late 1974 PC joined the newly founded and France-based Junta Democrática, a co-ordination platform grouping radical left-wing parties strongly influenced by PCE; the same year Zavala joined its Spanish executive, Comisión Permanente. At the time Zavala's perspectives in Spanish politics might have seemed bright; in the atmosphere of imminent change just behind the corner, some press titles listed him among "25 politicians for the future".

== Climax and decline (1975–1981) ==
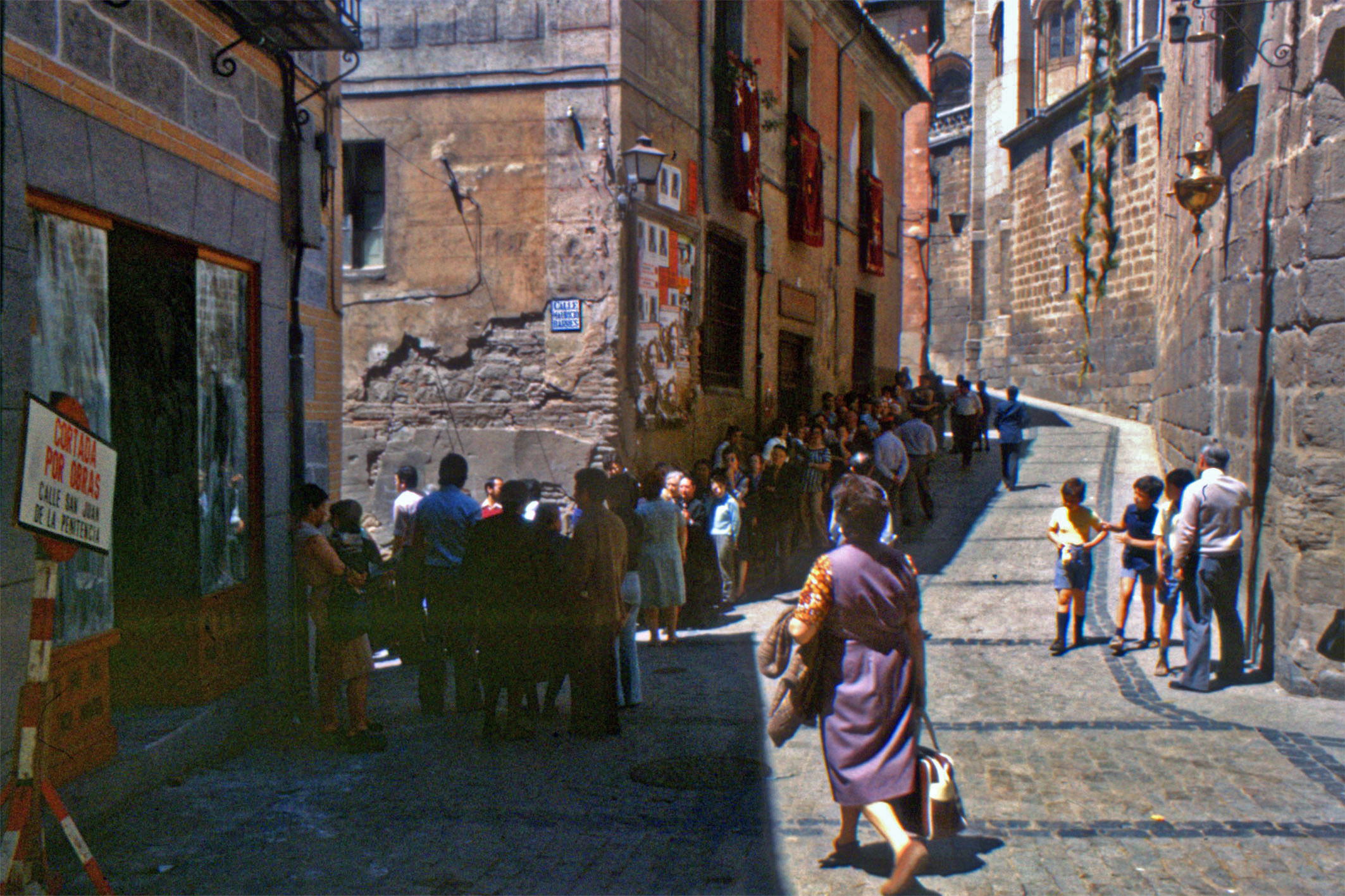
1977 elections

Once in 1976 Junta Democrática merged into Platajunta, Zavala entered its co-ordination board; he viewed the body as a way towards a federation of socialist parties, including Partido Carlista. He spoke against gradual transformation; he viewed it as a smartly engineered manipulation of Francoist oligarchy and saw the Suarez government as part of a plot, intended to ensure continuity of the regime. He played down the importance of Ley para la Reforma Política and called for boycott of the referendum. Instead, Zavala advocated a ruptura, radical if not revolutionary change which would do away with all remnants of the old system. His 1977 book, Partido Carlista, was a Marxism-inspired manifesto of "self-managing socialism" and formed part of so-called "clarificación ideológica", intended to build a new Carlism. The work enhanced his image from an energetic politician to a theorist.

At the time political strength of Partido Carlista remained unknown; some speculated it might emerge as a significant force and Zavala might become one of key Spanish statesmen. Press published interviews with him and even top national papers questioned him about future developments; he was among politicians consulted by the government. The cabinet had some apprehensions about potentially disruptive capacity of PC and the party was among the few which were not legalized prior to the 1977 general elections; its candidates ran on makeshift electoral lists and Zavala himself did not stand. The first test of the party strength proved disastrous; PC gained 0.05% of the votes. Zavala was subject to internal criticism, also for dictatorial leadership and "represión sistemática" of his opponents. In response, he organized IV Congress; his "simple cure for all these ills was a call to action". He stuck to the radical course; though he called for support of the constitution draft in the 1978 referendum, he declared it a transitory measure and not a firm foundation for the new Spain.

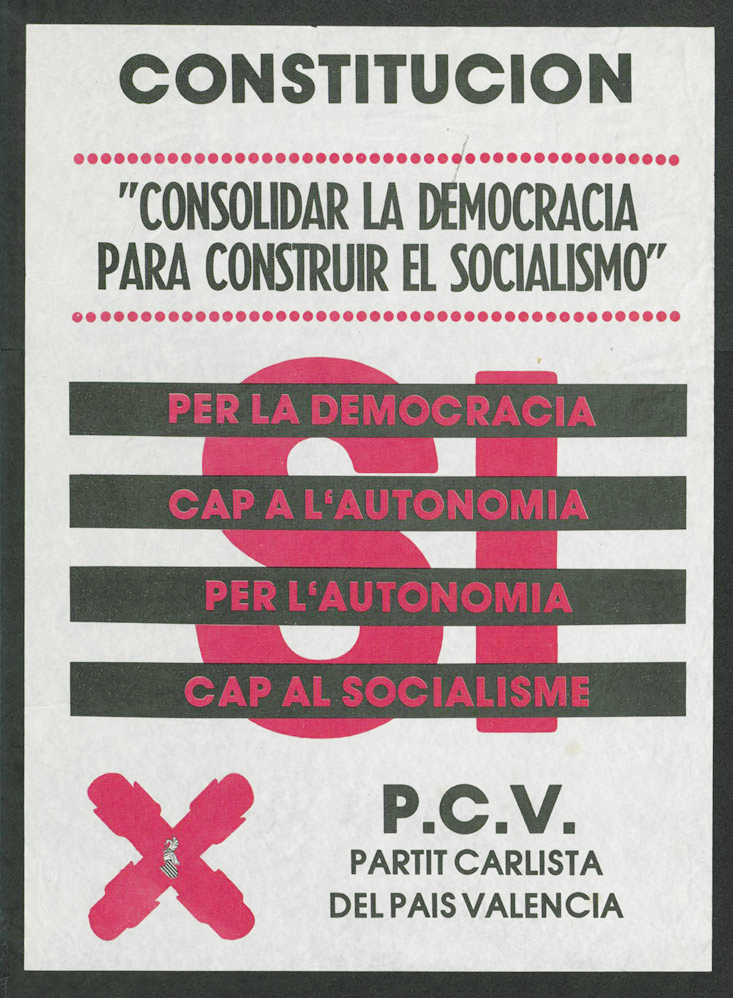
referendum poster, 1978

Before the 1979 elections PC has been legalized; Zavala headed the list in Murcia. The result was another heavy blow; the party gathered 0.28% of the votes and Zavala himself attracted only 0.41% of the voters. Instead of a notable force, Partido Carlista turned a third-rate grouplet. In May 1979 Zavala resigned as secretario general. Later that year he and Carlos Hugo suggested dissolution of the party; it was saved mostly by a handful of Navarrese militants. In October 1979 Zavala resigned from all functions and withdrew; he did not take part in the V. Congress in December. Following some unclarity, in early 1980 together with Carlos Hugo he launched a think-tank Centro Europeo de Estudios Sociológicos and became its vice-president. However, once the prince left for the United States in 1981, the CEES went into inactivity. Zavala almost withdrew into privacy, moderately active in the Madrid Círculo Cultural Valle Inclán. In 1986 he was briefly involved in launch of Izquierda Unida. He maintained close contacts with Carlos Hugo and in 1990 he accompanied the prince during the journey to the Holy Land.

== In historiography ==
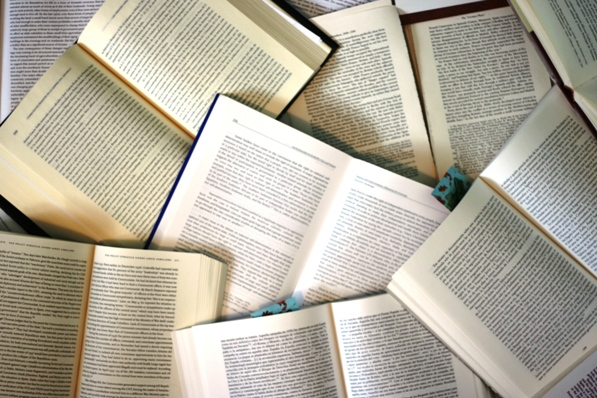

Zavala is not viewed as a noteworthy figure in Spanish history, and he is missing even in works dedicated to transición. However, he attracted much attention of historians dealing with Carlism of late Francoism. He is generally presented as one of key party militants who contributed to emergence of the progressist group, which challenged the Traditionalist ideological core and at one point dominated Carlism. Named "hombre clave en la evolución ideológica y política del Carlismo" or leader of the group which inspired ideological evolution, depending upon political preferences of partisan authors he is presented either as an evil spirit who contributed to destruction of the grand movement or as a far-sighted politician who steered Carlism through purification process from reactionary grip back to its socialist roots. Except Carlos Hugo, no other politician is more frequently mentioned as a protagonist of transformation of the movement in the 1960s and the 1970s.

There are different views as to Zavala's political trajectory. One opinion is that from the onset he was bent on introducing a profound change and turning Carlism into a left-wing movement. Another opinion is that initially he merely had a vague sense of direction, but was unsure about final objectives; reportedly it was only some time mid-way that he got radicalized. According to some he was a great intellectual, a theorist and a man with vision who designed and developed the concept of socialismo autogestionario. Others prefer to view him rather as a pragmatic man of action, who at an early phase remained in the shadow of Ramón Massó and at a later one as a theorist was overtaken by Pedro José Zabala or José Carlos Clemente. While some historians tend to view Zavala as the one who possibly inspired and influenced Carlos Hugo, others present Zavala rather as a man who carried out the change, designed by the prince. Even if sympathetic, some academics view his theoretical framework as flawed by simplifications; others might deem it absurd. Also the political stand adopted by Partido Carlista during transición might be viewed as entirely miscalibrated; most Spaniards opted for gradual, evolutionary transición and were entirely mistrustful about radical ruptura, including a leap into the unknown of "self-managing socialism".

Carlos Hugo, the personal friend of "fidelísimo Pepe" or "Pepe Zavala", as he was commonly known, in his obituary article declared him one of the most relevant figures of recent history. He was reportedly the man unjustly forgotten, who should be present in collective memory as the one who helped to bring democracy to Spain. Other obituaries were somewhat more cautious; one portrayed him as a man of genuinely democratic convictions, who however "got lost in the labyrinth of a party with no perspectives and plagued by contradictions". Progressist authors currently related to Partido Carlista might name Zavala a "controversial figure", though he is moderately present on PC websites. Traditionalist authors deny him the Carlist identity altogether. At times he might be confused with other individuals.

== See also ==
- Carlism
- Carlist Party (1970)

== Footnotes ==
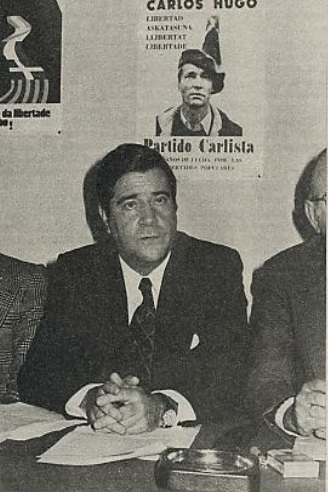
Zavala during electoral campaign, 1977
