= Karlista Alderdia =

Karlista Alderdia is Basque for "Carlist Party". It may refer to either of two political parties operating in Spain:

- Carlist Party (1970), which operates across Spain
- Carlist Party of Euskal Herria, which only operates in the Basque Country
