= Carlist Party of Euskal Herria =

Political party in the Basque Country

Carlist Party of Euskal Herria Partido Carlista de Euskal Herria - Euskalherriko Karlista Alderdia
- Leader: José María Porro Sáinz
- Secretary-General: Feliciano Vélez
- Founded: 1974; 51 years ago
- Headquarters: Calle Pozoblanco, 15-Bis, 1º Pamplona
- Newspaper: Montejurra
- Youth wing: Juventudes Carlistas
- Union affiliation: Unión Sindical Obrera
- Ideology: Basque federalism Carlism; Christian left Confederalism; Fueros; Left-wing nationalism Constitutional monarchism Workers' self-management
- Political position: Left-wing
- National affiliation: Carlist Party of Spain
- Colors: Red

Website
- eka.partidocarlista.org

The Carlist Party of Euskal Herria (Basque: Euskalherriko Karlista Alderdia, Spanish: Partido Carlista de Euskal Herria; EKA), before 2000 known as the Carlist Party of Euskadi, is a left-wing Carlist Basque political party with presence in the Spanish Basque Country. The party was historically part of the pro-Carlos Hugo wing of the Carlist movement. The party was not legalized until late 1977.

== Organization and ideology ==
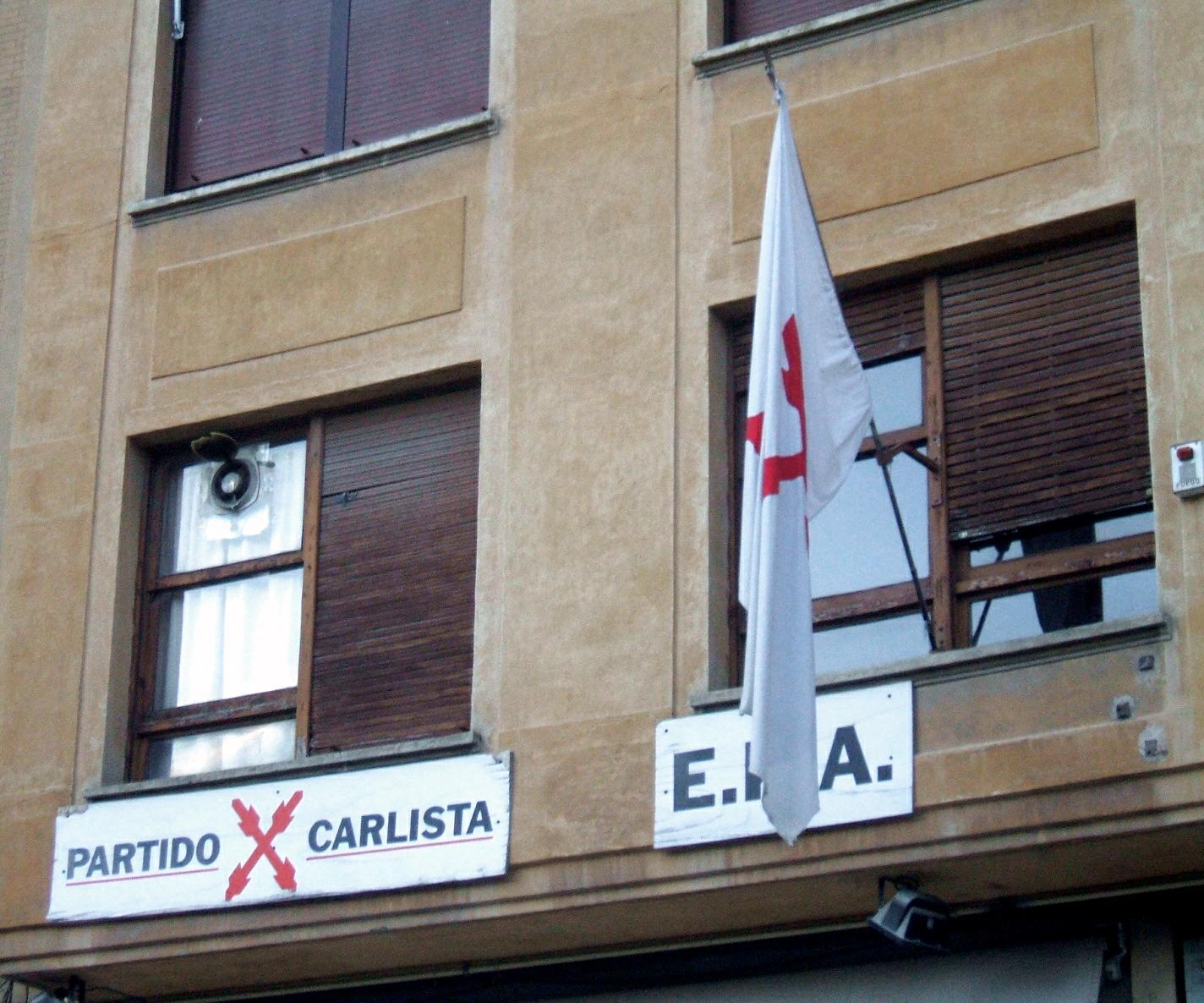
Party headquarters, Estella-Lizarra

The EKA defines itself as a federation of the Carlist parties of each of the four Basque provinces (Navarre, Álava, Gipuzkoa and Biscay), each of them fully autonomous in their respective territories.

At the state level, the EKA is confederated with the Carlist Party of Spain (or the Spains according to the traditional terminology of the movement), one of the parties that claims to be the direct heir of the historic Carlist movement. The party has an official magazine, Montejurra, which it is also the name of the mountain where they celebrate their annual feast.

After the general assembly of October 2008, the party appointed José Maria Porro Saínz (ex-militant of the Grupos de Acción Carlista and one of the leaders of Unión Sindical Obrera in Navarre) as its secretary general and Feliciano Vélez (who after the municipal elections of 2007, was elected mayor of the Navarrese town of Puente la Reina in the lists of the Agrupación Electoral Puentesina) as organization secretary.

Ideologically, the party defends a model of socialism based in workers' self-management and a federal Euskal Herria in a confederal Spain.

== History ==
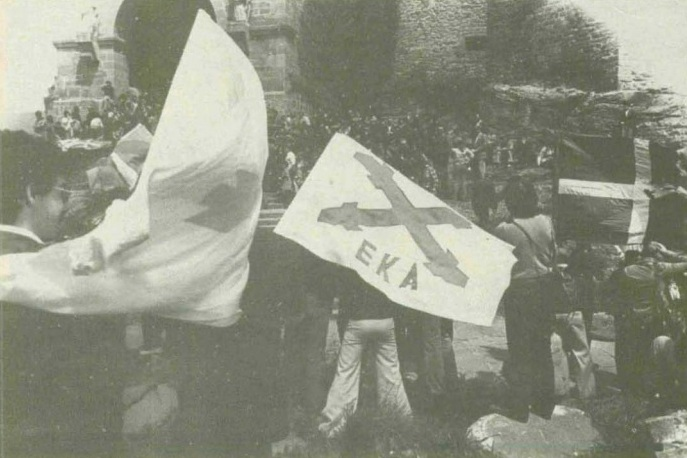
EKA rally, Javier 1977

The EKA was one of the organizers of the 1976 Aberri Eguna in collaboration with the various parties of the Basque independentist left (including ETA(m), ETA(pm), EHAS and LAIA) and the Spanish revolutionary left (MC, LCR and ORT). In February 1977, the party participated in the creation of the Euskal Erakunde Herritarra.

Initially, the Frente Obrero was linked to the Workers' Commissions, but due to the influence of the Communist Party of Spain (PCE) in them the EKA eventually opted for the Unión Sindical Obrera, with which it shared common aspirations regarding self-management socialism as its social project.

In April 1977, 150 EKA members occupied the Diputación of Navarre in protest against the violation of human rights by the Spanish state. The same year, the government denied the legalization of the party that presented a list to the elections called Agrupación Montejurra.

The position of the party in the constitutional referendum of 1978 generated an intense and complicated internal debate. Finally, the party asked for an affirmative vote, but they lost a relevant number of members due to this decision.

During the 1990s, its secretary general was the lawyer Jose Angel Navarro Pérez-Nievas. In 1996, the party published a pacifist manifest calling for both the end of ETA and repression. In 1998, it signed the Pact of Estella.

== Institutional presence ==
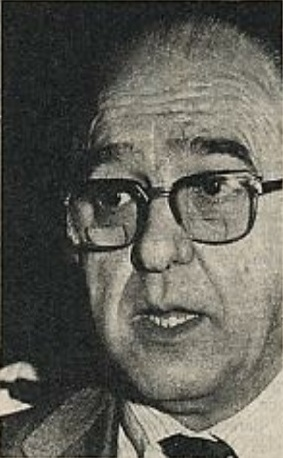
Mariano Zufia

Until 1987, the EKA had about ten councilors in the town councils of several medium-sized urban areas like Tolosa (Gipuzkoa) or Sangüesa (Navarre). In smaller rural towns, the party always supported or created diverse local platforms, like Agrupación Electoral Puentesina in Puente la Reina (Navarre). In the local elections of 2003, the following Navarrese carlists were elected as councilors: Gerardo Montoya (Noain), Feliciano Vélez and Aurelio Laita (Puente La Reina – Gares), J. Joaquín Urra (Artajona - Artaxoa), Federico Salcedo (Andosilla), Cruz Barandalla and Roberto Beruete (Zirauki) and Carlos García (Tabar).

The only institutional representation the party ever got other than local representatives was a Navarrese member of parliament (Mariano Zufía Urrizalqui) in 1979–1983.
