= Mariano Zufía Urrizalqui =

Spanish politician and Navarrese public official

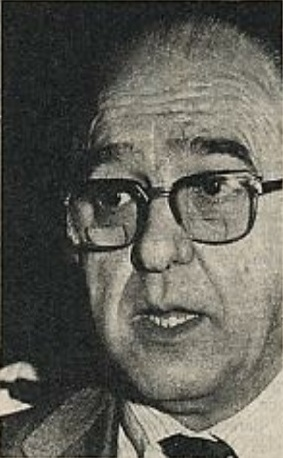
- Zufía in the mid-1970s
- Born: Mariano Zufía Urrizalqui; 1920; Pamplona, Spain
- Died: 2005 (aged 84–85); Pamplona, Spain
- Occupation: bank official
- Known for: politician, official
- Political party: Comunión Tradicionalista, Partido Carlista

Mariano Zufía Urrizalqui (Basque: Mariano Zufia Urrizalki; 1920–2005), was a Spanish politician and a Navarrese public official. In 1966-1973 he served in the Pamplonese city council, in two separate strings as a deputy mayor. In 1974-1979 he was member of the Navarrese advisory body Consejo Foral, while in 1979-1983 he held a seat in the regional Parlamento Foral. In 1982-1992 he was president of Cámara de Comptos, the Navarrese institution responsible for tax collection and the self-government-controlled public sector finances. He ran for the Cortes in 1971, 1977 and 1979, but failed. Politically he supported the Carlist cause, until the 1960s within its mainstream Traditionalist current, and afterwards as member of the progressist carlohuguista faction. In 1977-1979 he headed Euskadiko Karlista Alderdia, the Basque-Navarese branch of Partido Carlista; in 1979-1983 he was the nationwide leader of PC.

== Family and youth ==
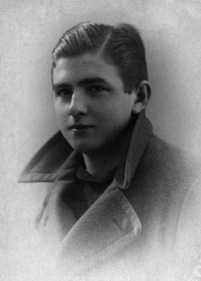
as teenage requeté

First representatives of the Zufía family were noted in the Navarrese town of Larraga in the late 17th century; in the late 18th century a carpenter Miguel Zufía rose to the status of a locally known artist. Close to nothing is known about Mariano's great-grandfather José Miguel Zufía Guerendiáin. His son and Mariano's grandfather Mariano Brígido Zufía García left Larraga and moved to Pamplona either in the late 1880s or early 1890s; sources refer to his “modest” social standing. His son and Mariano's father, Lázaro Zufía Saenz (1892-1958) was born already in the Navarrese capital; he had to earn a living at the young age and became a railway man, rising to “jefe de estación” in Andoain, Leiza and Pamplona-Empalme. At unspecified time he married a Pamplonese girl from the family of similar status, Matilde Urrizalqui Campos. The couple lived at various locations in Gipuzkoa and Navarre following the professional lot of Lázaro; Matilde used to run a buffet for train passengers. They had 4 children; out of these, 2 died in infancy.

Mariano frequented schools in Pamplona and Andoain; in the early 1930s he entered a preparatory college for Seminario Mayor in Saturrarán. Following 2 years he resigned religious career and entered Instituto of Pamplona; the civil war broke out when Zufía was in midst of bachillerato course. He volunteered to requeté, but following 2 months on the frontline in Sierra de Guadarrama he fell ill and was treated in a hospital in Burgos. When released he resumed education and completed another grade, until in January 1937 he volunteered to requeté again. Followed few months he returned home and completed the bachillerato. In late 1938 he applied to aviation school but was rejected due to poor eyesight. Instead, as 18-year-old, he was drafted. Zufía applied to the alferéz provisional school in Pamplona, where he remained assigned until after the war. Following few months of service in Valencia in late 1939 he resigned from the army and took courses in commerce. In 1942 he was employed at junior position in the Pamplona branch of Banco de Bilbao.

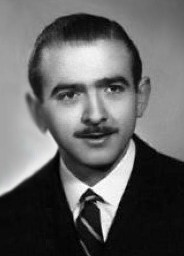
wedding photo, 1947

In 1947 Zufía married Rosalia Sanz Gurbindo (died 2011); none of the sources consulted provides information either on her or on her family. Until 1948 they lived in Pamplona, then following Zufía's professional bank assignments in Tudela (1948-1951), Estella (1951-1953) and again in Tudela (1953-1959), where Zufía became director of the local Banco de Bilbao office. In 1959 they returned to Pamplona as Zufía was appointed deputy-manager of the BdB branch in the Navarrese capital. The couple had 7 children, born between 1948 and 1963; Mariano, José Javier, Carlos, Mertxe, Rosa, Pablo and Enrique Zufía Sanz. None of them became a widely known public figure. Rosa Zufía Sanz is locally recognized in Gipuzkoa as a journalist related to the Basque broadcaster ETB and director of its culture section, EITB Kultura-Transit, while Carlos Zufía Sanz as co-director of a Navarrese media think-tank CIES occasionally takes part in related conferences or other events.

== Early public engagements (prior to 1960) ==
Carlist standard

Both Zufía's parents came from Carlist families and were Carlists themselves. His father was member of Traditionalist trade unions and under the pen-name “Rozala Afizu” he contributed to Traditionalist dailies, El Pensamiento Navarro and La Constancia. Already in his early teens the young Mariano engaged in the movement; he joined Muthiko Alaiak, the folk group animated by the iconic Pamplonese Carlist Ignacio Baleztena, he played football in the amateur team formed by boys from the local Carlist círculo, entered Agrupación Escolar Tradicionalista and took part in school strikes of 1935–1936, staged as protests against what was perceived as anti-religious educational policy of the Republic. A later hagiographic biography underlines Zufía's Catholic conviction as the key motive behind his political choice, and suggests that it outweighed some socialist leaning, took after his maternal uncle. In the mid-1930s Zufía enlisted to requeté and as an adolescent boy trained with wooden rifle in the hills surrounding Pamplona. He actually served in requeté combat units during two short strings, in the summer of 1936 and in the spring of 1937.

Zufía refused to accept the unification into Falange Española Tradicionalista; at the time he was in personal entourage of José María Zaldivar Arenzana, the fiercely anti-falangist AET jefe. He judged that Franco had cynically used the Carlists. When released from a new period of military service, spent in the Canary Islands as at the time Spain feared Allied invasion on the archipelago, in 1944 he was taking part in anti-Francoist rallies, staged in Pamplona. Following one of them he got detained; on charges of raising “subversive cries” the administration ordered his 6-month forced settlement in Zaragoza. Upon his return to the Navarrese capital he immediately resumed opposition activities; they climaxed in a grand Carlist rally of December 1945, which ended up in a melee and the city turned into battleground between the Carlists and the security forces. Zufía was again detained and spent 2 weeks behind bars; as charges of possession of firearms have not been proven, he was eventually released.

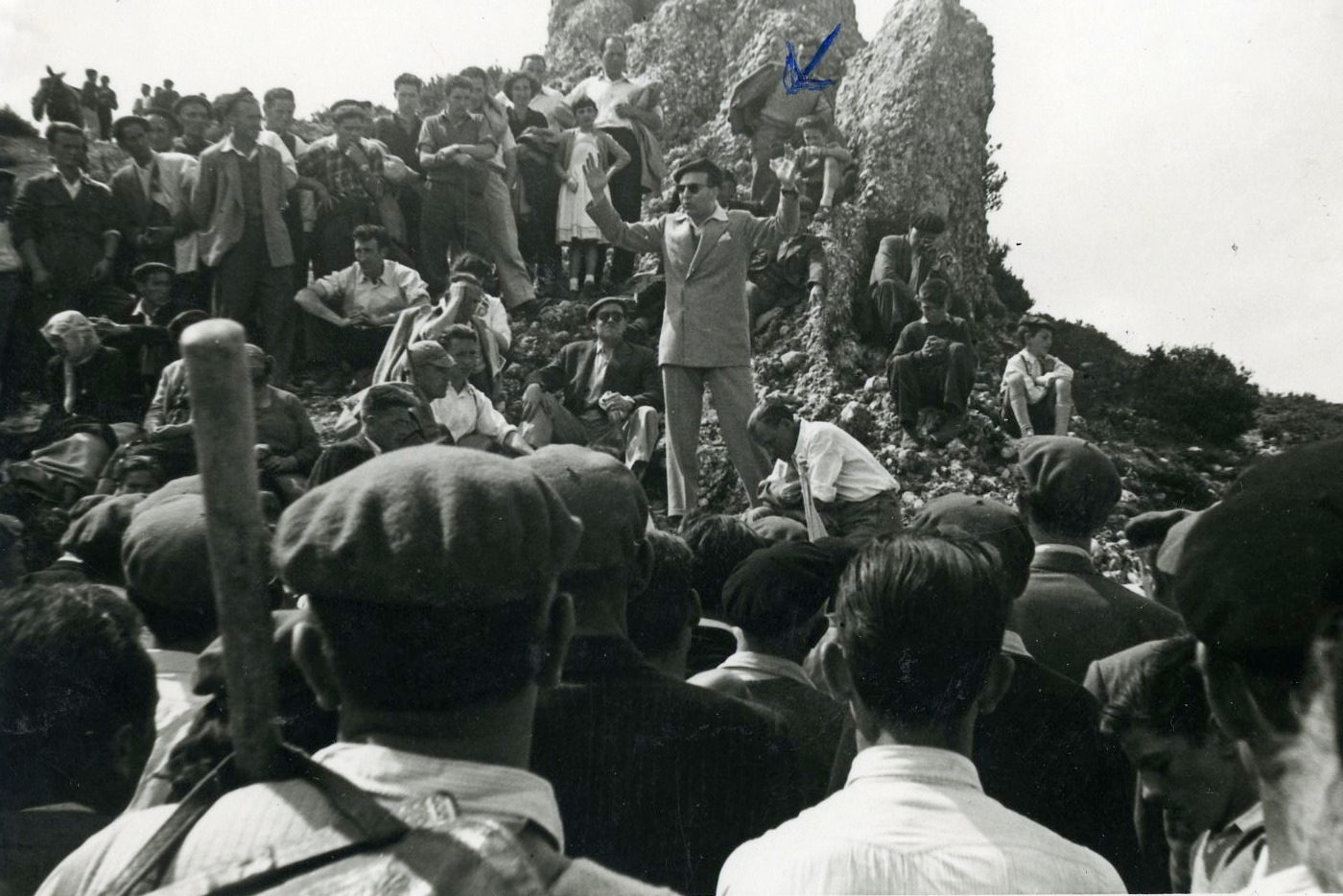
Montejurra ascent, mid-1950s

Upon getting married in 1947 Zufía focused on his growing family and on professional career, especially that in 1948-1959 he lived in provincial Navarrese cities. At the time his Carlist activity boiled down to cultivating private links and to frequenting the annual Montejurra ascents. Works on Carlism of the 1950s do not mention him as a protagonist of the Navarrese movement and he is missing in both historiographic works and in private accounts. He rather engaged in lay Catholic organizations; Zufía started to attend “cursillos de cristiandad”, which enhanced his Catholic outlook and also re-formatted it along more social lines. In the late 1950s he started to give lectures himself, e.g. on pre-marital preparatory courses organized by parishes, and joined Acción Católica de Medios Sociales Independientes. As he later commented, these initiatives produced his intellectual maturity and directed him towards “a more just, free and equal society”.

== Rise to officialdom (1960-1971) ==
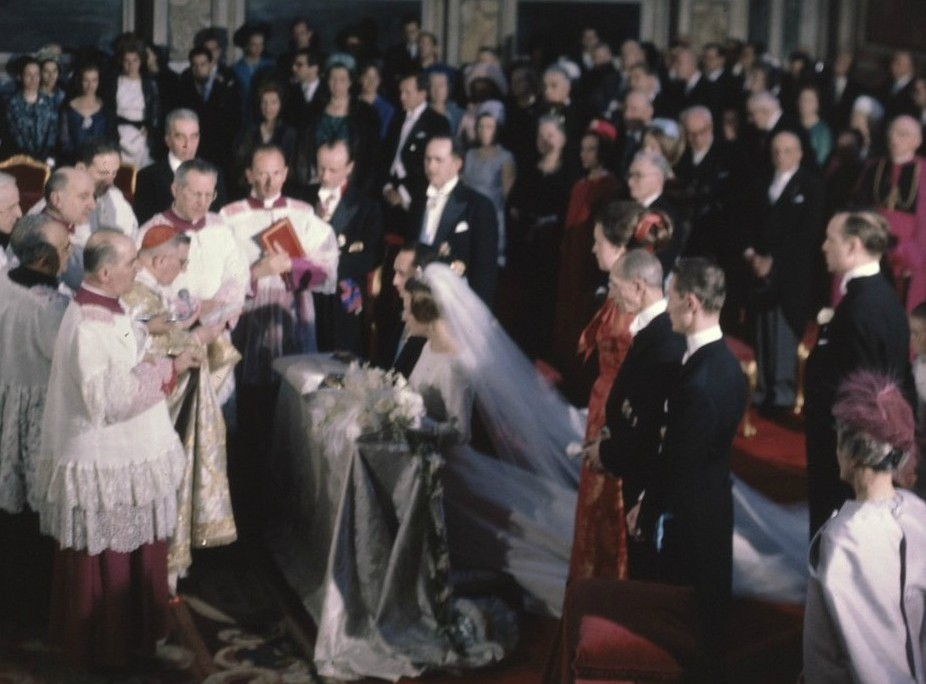
wedding of Carlos Hugo, 1964

In 1960 Zufía for the first time aspired to public post; he headed a list of Carlist candidates, who from the so-called tercio familiar pool and on a hardly veiled anti-Francoist ticket ran for the Pamplona town hall. He emerged successful, only to find that his mandate has been annulled by the electoral office. He did not meet the requirement of 2-year-residence in the district; the later biography presents this episode as a minor technicality used by the administration to prevent opposition candidates from entering the ayuntamiento. During the next campaign of 1963 Zufía did not stand, but he co-ordinated the provincial Carlist campaign; it resulted in 3 party candidates having been elected. He welcomed what looked like revitalization of Carlism, promoted by prince Carlos Hugo and his entourage; in 1964 Zufía and his wife travelled to Rome to attend the wedding ceremony of the prince. In Navarre he was already emerging as a recognized Carlist personality.

During the local elections of 1966 Zufía stood as the candidate of Hermandad Obrera de Acción Católica. He and two other HOAC contenders were elected. Zufía was nominated one of deputy mayors and elected as president of Comisión de Hacienda. In 1967-1969 he served in Comisión Permanente of the ayuntamiento. He soon earned his name as the person who engaged in numerous community-oriented initiatives and became known as member of “grupo social”. Some of his initiatives, marked by the anti-regime flavor, triggered reaction; the 1968 conference on human rights was suspended by administration. The same year Zufía refused to sign a manifesto which condemned the ETA bombing attempt during Vuelta a España; he explained he could not have signed a document which endorsed the regime. In return he was dismissed as teniente de alcalde, which in turn triggered some minor public protests. In 1969 he was fined 25,000 pesetas for irregularities related to organisation of the massive Montejurra rally. In the early 1970s he was reinstated as deputy mayor when nominated the 5th teniente de alcalde, and he again entered Comisión Permanente of the ayuntamiento.

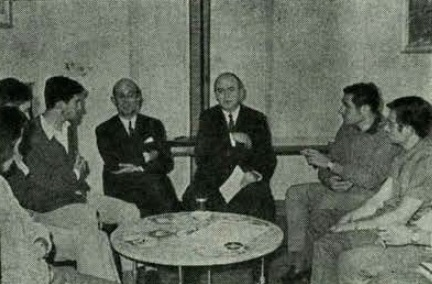
Zufia (3fR) as city councilor, 1968

In the late 1960s the progressive faction of Carlos Hugo marginalized the Traditionalists and took control over the Carlist structures nationwide. None of the sources consulted lists Zufía as a protagonist in this confrontation. On the one hand, he cultivated Traditionalist features when engaged in religious initiatives, be it as member of Consejo Pastoral or Junta Diocesana Económica; he even drafted new economic scheme for local parishes, the plan well received by the archbishop. On the other hand, his social endeavors in the ayuntamiento – e.g. support for so-called Plan Sur, a massive development project targeting southern outskirts of Pamplona and opposed by the establishment - were perfectly in line with the progressive line, advanced by Carlos Hugo. As member of the Navarrese regional party executive Zufía supported expulsion from Carlist structures of the Baleztena brothers and later admitted having been fully supportive of the radical left-wing turn, engineered by the carlohuguistas.

== Rise to Partido Carlista command (1971-1976) ==
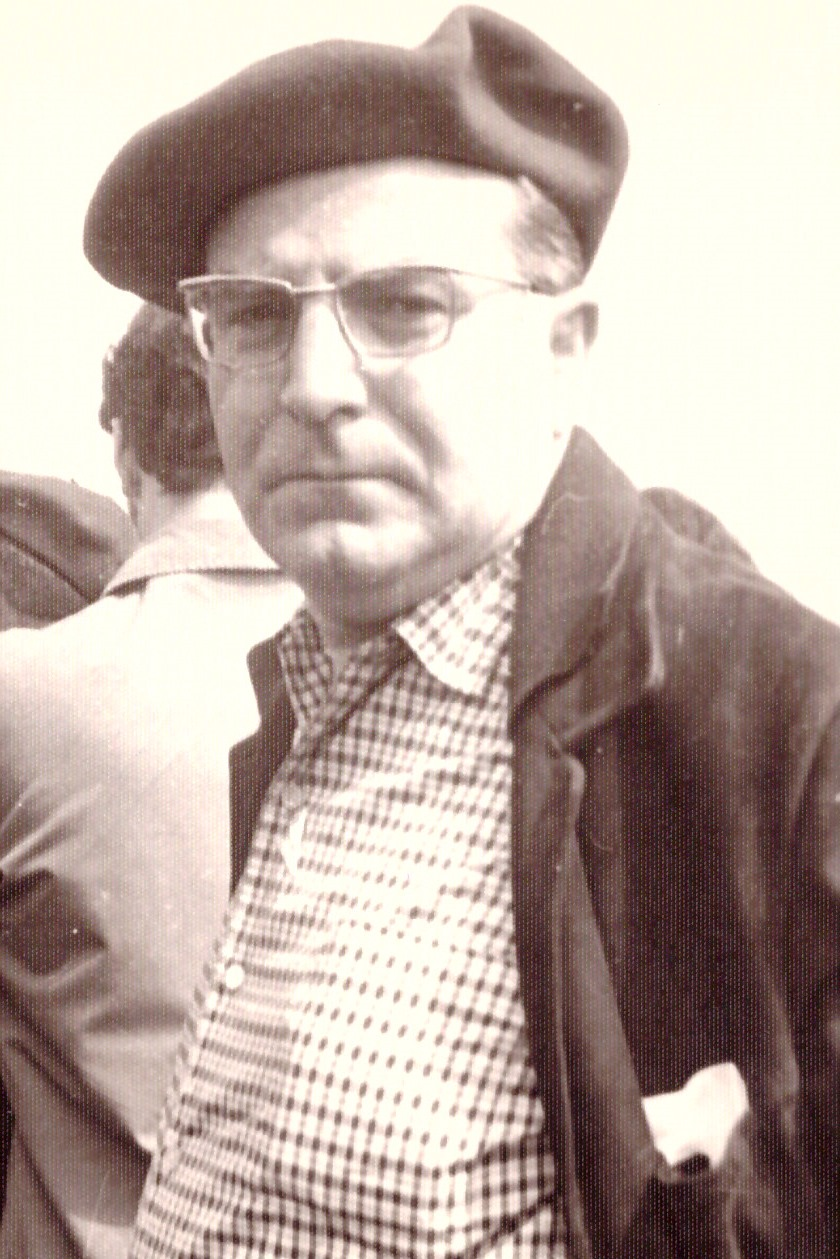
Zubiaur

Since the late 1960s Zufía, deputy director of the Pamplona Banco de Bilbao branch and member of the city council, was a recognized and well-positioned figure in Navarre; as such he started frequenting meetings of the carlohuguista command group, organized across the border in Arbonne. His party activity became increasingly hectic; he took part in executive sittings, delivered lectures at various courses or attended semi-legal assemblies. Following reformatting of Carlist structures into Partido Carlista, in 1970 or 1971 he entered so-called Gabinete Ideológico, a doctrinal council of the organization; Zufía formed part of a 3-member Comisión Delegada for socio-economic studies. In late 1971 two Carlist members of the outgoing Cortes, José Zubiaur and Auxilio Goñi, refused to sign an in-blanco resignation, required by Carlos Hugo as a condition of their endorsement in the forthcoming elections. Zufía tried to persuade Zubiaur to accept the scheme, but failed. Eventually Zubiaur and Goñi secured recommendations needed for Zufía to stand in the elections. His campaign focused on peace, social justice, Navarre and family, but he failed.

In 1971 Zufía was nominated to the newly created Partido Carlista supreme body Junta de Gobierno, and especially to its permanent Secretaría General; in 1972 he entered one more structure, Consejo de Dirección. Increasingly often he used to co-sign key party documents, represented the party in Navarrese strike committees, as a bank professional he helped to manage funds, and interfaced with other clandestine organizations like Federación Obrera Socialista. In 1973 he refused to sign a town hall declaration which condemned the ETA attempt against Carrero Blanco; formal investigation has been launched against him, but it produced no repressive measures.

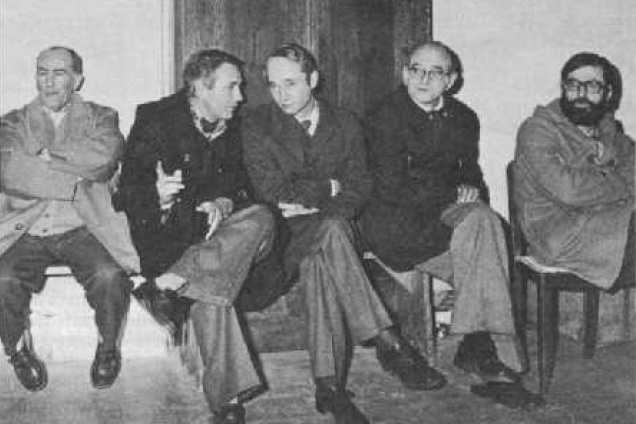
Zufia (2fR) at protest sitting, Hendaye, mid-1970s

In 1973 and for reasons which are not clear Zufía did not seek prolongation of his term in the city council; as a result, it expired in 1974. However, the same year he stood in elections to Consejo Foral, a peculiar provincial Navarrese advisory body with rather limited powers; he was comfortably elected. During final years of Francoism Zufía and his sons were heavily engaged in numerous semi-clandestine activities, e.g. since 1974 in his house he hosted the editorial board of a bulletin titled Denok batean and provided residence to its chief editor. In establishment circles he was viewed as a dangerous subversive; in spite of earlier arrangements he was not promoted to director of the Banco de Bilbao Pamplonese branch. His relations with the bank were already loose; in the early 1970s he was on unpaid leave, which enabled him to take a job restructuring financial structures of the Pamplona diocese. Eventually, in late 1975 he arranged for premature retirement from the bank and despite poor conditions offered, he did retire the following year.

== In the party executive (1976-1979) ==
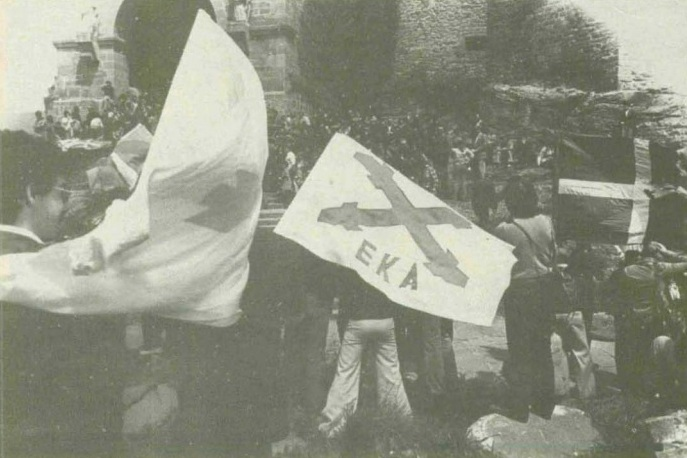
EKA in Javier, 1977

In late 1975 Carlos Hugo asked Zufía to move to Madrid to manage nationwide politics of Partido Carlista on the daily basis. He agreed and in early 1976 he represented PC in co-ordination committee of Plataforma de Convergencía Democrática. Once Plataforma merged with Junta Democrática into so-called Platajunta Zufía assumed the same role in the new alliance. His hectic activity a few times triggered interventions of the police and his sons were detained a number of times; he also represented radical left-wing opposition on various congresses abroad. Like most of PC leaders he advanced a so-called rupturista strategy; Zufía called for a radical, revolutionary change of political regime instead of gradual transformation into democracy. In late 1976 he declared that “we live under dictatorial regime”, and that “essentially, this government proceeds on the authoritarian path”.

Following more than a year in Madrid Zufía returned to Pamplona in 1977; within the federative structure of Partido Carlista he assumed jefatura of its vasco-navarrese branch, Euskadiko Karlista Alderdia; he also held the seat in Consejo Federal del Partido Carlista. His efforts focused on formal registration of the party so that it could take part in forthcoming general elections. In April he and some 100 PC militants stormed the Consejo Foral building, declared occupation of the premises, displayed Basque and Carlist flags and demanded legalization of PC. Some Consejo members demanded his expulsion from the body, but eventually the motion came to nothing. In May 1977 he delivered one of his rare addresses at a mass rally, namely to the crowd of party followers gathered – instead of the suspended Montejurra ascent – in Javier. As a PC representative he held talks with ETA, reportedly to ensure peaceful electoral campaign. At times he appeared at rallies beyond Navarre, e.g. in Catalonia.

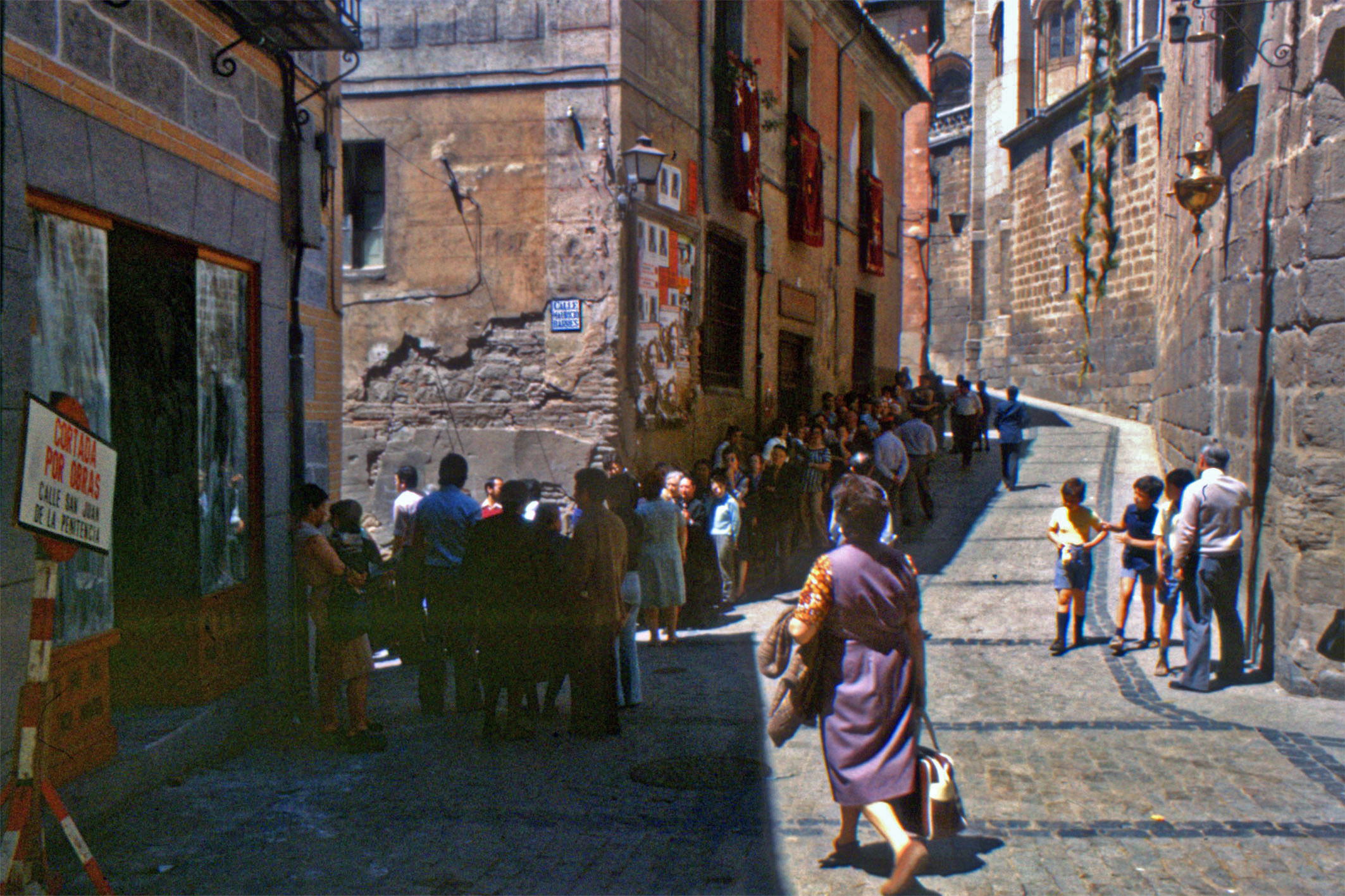
general elections, 1977

PC has not been registered prior to elections and it campaigned as “Agrupación Electoral Montejurra”; Zufía headed the list of PC candidates to the lower chamber in Navarre, but with 8,451 votes it failed. In late 1977 he co-organized Carlos Hugo's re-entry into Spain and was among protagonists of the party congress, as PC got eventually legalized. As member of Consejo Foral throughout 1978 he remained heavily engaged in works on Navarrese foral regime – with some of his radical proposals adopted – and in labors on draft of the Basque autonomous statute. As member of “ponencia redactora del Estatuto de Autonomía” Zufía claimed that Navarre “belongs to the Basque Country” and opted for a common Basque-Navarrese unit, but given limited support in the region he started to backtrack. In the general elections of early 1979 Zufía stood in Navarre as a PC candidate for the senate; with 18,303 votes gathered he failed. However, a month later he ran for the newly established Navarrese Parlamento Foral. Running in the Estella district Zufía collected 12,165 votes; with 4,8% of the total, his result proved sufficient for election. His Consejo Foral ticket expired in 1979 as under the new regional regime the body ceased to exist.

== Party leader (1979-1983) ==
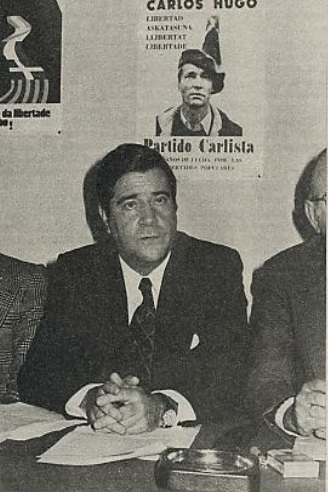
José Ma Zavala

Following disastrous electoral result of 1979 most PC high executives, including its president Carlos Hugo and the secretary general José María Zavala, resigned. It seemed that the prince, disillusioned and embittered by defeat, was pondering upon dissolution of the party, the option incomprehensible to old militants like Zufía. Shortly afterwards Carlos Hugo left the party and withdrew from Spanish politics altogether. However, the Partido Carlista congress of November 1979 was dominated by these willing to go on. Zufía – who stood out among mostly 30- and 40-year-olds, former requeté, man of proven party record, longtime Navarrese official, member of Parlamento Foral and a local known personality - was elected the new secretario general. He had no counter-candidate and was voted unanimously. As the position of party president has been abolished, Zufía effectively became the leader of Partido Carlista; at the same time he vacated the position of EKA secretary general. He declared that Carlos Hugo abandoned the party for personal reasons and with the intention to confuse.

Most information on Zufía's public activity in the early 1980s is related to his mandate in the Navarrese parliament. He continued to focus on social problems and advocated setup of Cámara Económico-Social, animated emergence of a regional secular Navarrese university and confronted the Right. Particular controversy was triggered by his support for Herri Batasuna motion that the Franco-awarded laurel be removed from the Navarrese flag; Traditionalist groupings denied him the name of a Carlist and wondered “if he retained a sole drop of the blood of the ancient and true Carlism of God, Fatherland, Fueros, and King”, effectively lambasting him as a traitor. In 1981 the regional parliament thanks to votes of PSOE deputies and against votes of the Right elected him as the first president of Cámara de Comptos, a historical Navarrese body re-established to deal with local tax collection and management of public sector expenses; he assumed the duty in early 1982.

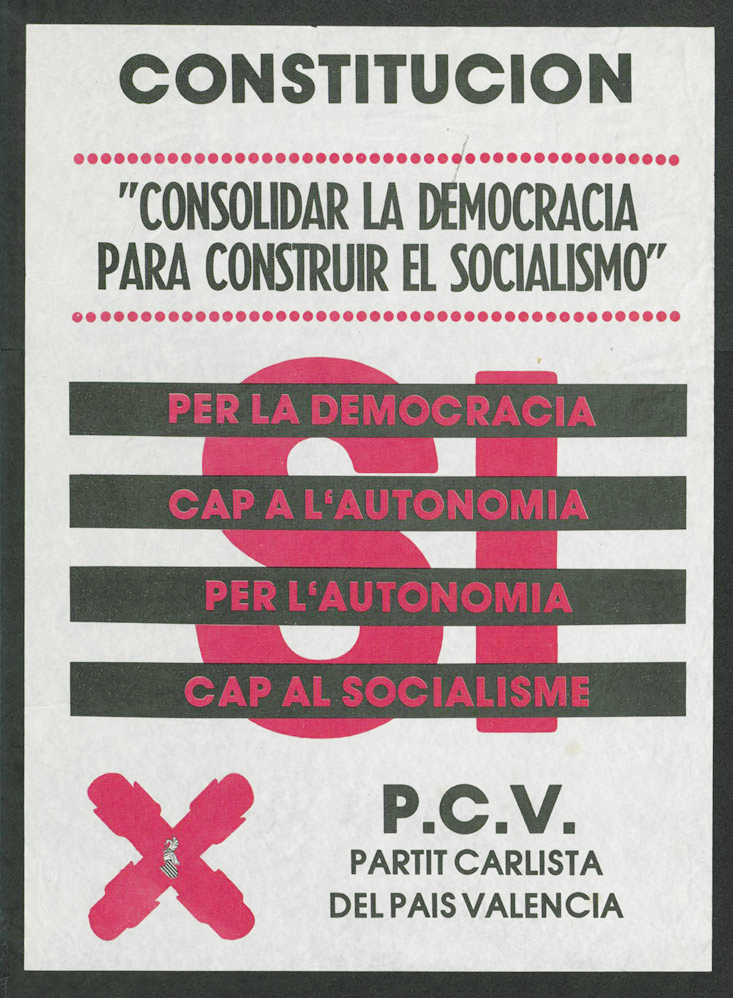
PC referendum poster

Within Partido Carlista Zufía's task was to combat defeatism in the party ranks. However, he failed to stop disintegration of the electoral social base. During electoral campaign of 1982 Zufía initially headed the PC list for the Senate, but it was eventually withdrawn and the party did not take part in elections. During the local Navarrese elections of 1983 the party garnered 2,55% of the votes compared to 4,79% collected in 1979. Zufía led the Carlist list and failed; hence, his term of the Parlamento Foral member came to the end and Partido Carlista lost its only representative in self-governmental Navarrese structures. He acknowledged defeat and in 1983 resigned as secretario general. In 1984 the new rules adopted by the Navarrese parliament specified that president of Cámara de Comptos must not be member of any political party. Forced to make choices, Zufía opted for the administrative career and in 1985 he resigned his membership in Partido Carlista. The same year thanks to PSOE votes he was re-elected as president of the Cámara.

== Last years (after 1985) ==
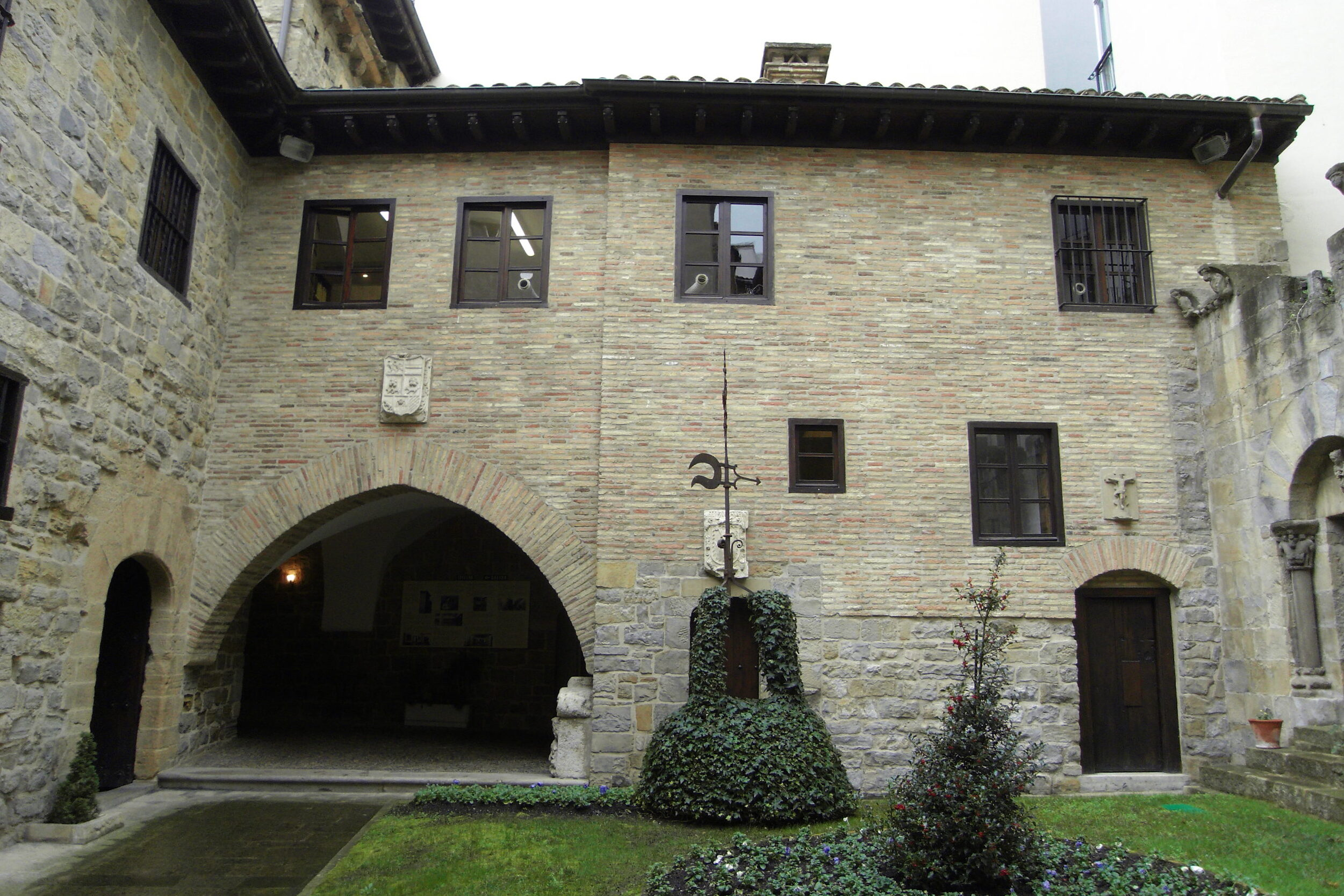
Cámara de Comptos site

In the late 1980s Zufía served his second term as president of Cámara de Comptos. His biography hails him as an impartial public servant bent on combating corruption, who advocated and in fact enforced transparency in the public sector. His term expired in 1991. He was entitled to re-election, but Zufía decided not to stand; he claimed that 10 years in office was long enough and that to ensure sanity in public administration, he should provide an example and resign. PSOE failed to persuade him to change his mind and Zufía ceased as president in 1992. On retirement he engaged in charity; his focus was mostly on Junta de la Fundación Tutelar Navarra, an organization serving the incapacitated; in 1993 he was elected its president.

Zufía still considered himself a Carlist. In the mid-1980s he declared that the party “could not simply disappear” and concluded that “all of this could not just be given up”. In the mid-1980s he supported Partido Carlista entry into a Communist-dominated Izquierda Unida, but following another disastrous general elections he concluded that PC had been cynically manipulated by the likes of Santiago Carillo. In the 1990s he changed his opinion about the party and summarized that Carlism “has a strong sentimental aspect” but it was no longer valid as a political platform. He claimed that for him Carlism remained sort of a general guideline, marked by socialism, self-management, and devolution. He remained proud of his past in the Carlist ranks and noted that though defeated as a rupturista strategy in the 1970s, at least carlohuguista progressism reclaimed Carlism from the ultra-reactionaries. He denied the Carlist name to Traditionalist orthodoxes, “people who follow a traditionalist and integralist ideology”. It is not clear what position he assumed in the 1990s when faced with a conflict between the Borbon-Parmas and the Carlist Party command, by some considered sectarian fanatic ayatollahs. He was increasingly irritated by policy adopted by the Right and by what he viewed as reactionary sector of the Church. Zufía perished due to “pulmonary illness”; at the moment he had 6 grandchildren.

Today Mariano Zufía is remembered mostly as the Navarrese public official, especially the one who helped to build the regional fiscal and public spendings machinery. In 2007 Fundación para la Formación e Investigación en Auditoría del Sector Público FIASEP, an independent institution promoting transparency in public finances, set up Premio Mariano Zufía; on irregular basis it is awarded since 2009. On some websites related to Partido Carlista he is recorded as the former party leader and a distinguished personality, especially that until today he remains the only PC representative who has ever been elected to either a regional or the national parliament. In historiographic works addressing either Carlism or the Spanish transición he appears marginally as a person who presided over disintegration of Partido Carlista into a third-rate political force.

== See also ==
- Carlist Party
- Carlist Party of Euskal Herria
- Socialismo autogestionario
