= Carlist Party (1970) =

Carlist Party Partido Carlista
- Secretary-General: José Lázaro Ibáñez
- Founded: 1970; 56 years ago
- Headquarters: C. Pozoblanco, 15bis, 31001 Pamplona
- Newspaper: El Federal
- Youth wing: Juventudes Carlistas
- Paramilitary wing: Carlist Action Groups (until 1972)
- Ideology: Carlism; Confederalism; Foralism; Left-wing nationalism Socialism; Monarchism; Catholic social teaching Christian left
- Political position: Left-wing
- Religion: Roman Catholicism
- National affiliation: United Left (1986–1987)
- Colours: Coral

Website
- partidocarlista.com

The Carlist Party (Spanish: Partido Carlista, Catalan: Partit Carlí, Basque: Karlista Alderdia, Galician: Partido Carlista, Asturian: Partíu Carlista; PC) is a Spanish political party that considers itself as a successor to the historical tradition of Carlism. The party was founded in 1970, although it remained illegal until 1977 following the death of the caudillo Francisco Franco and the democratisation of Spain.

Since 2000, the general secretary of the party has been Evaristo Olcina and its official publication since is El Federal. It has a political line of the alternative left, workers' self-management and confederalism. It annually organises the acts of Montejurra. The Carlist Party holds a federal structure with the possibility of it forming sovereign Carlist parties in the associate nationalities in the Carlist Party. The youths of the different Carlist parties and Carlist groups meet in the Carlist Youths. The party is known as the left wing of the Carlist movement, since the movement itself has historically been a right-wing conservative one.

The Carlist Party was also known for supporting Carlos Hugo, Duke of Parma over his brother for leading the Carlist movement.

== History ==
The current organisation of the Carlist Party originates from the renovation of the ideology of the illegal Traditionalist Communion, which it was conceived during the 1950s and 1960s in a situation of illegality and prohibition imposed in Francoist Spain to university and workers organisations of non-integrated Carlism (Group of Traditionalist Students, AET, the university; Traditionalist Worker's Movement, MOT, the workers) into the Francoist only official party, with the support of prince Carlos Hugo, Duke of Parma, even though the name of the Carlist Party did not materialize until the end of the 1960s.

Between 1970 and 1972, the Carlist Party organised Congresses of the Carlist People in Arbonne, in which it adopted a program for the ideological change of Carlism towards self-management socialism and the conversion of Carlist Party into a federal and democratic party of the masses and of class which aspired to a socialist-based monarchy in a pact between the dynasty and the people. The leader Francesc Xavier after suffering a serious automobile accident conceded full powers to his son Carlos Hugo, represented in Spain for José María de Zavala, to run the party and resigned on 20 April 1975.

According to party data, it contained around 25,000 members in 1977. In 1974, the Carlist Party went on to form an alliance jointly with other forces of the opposition from the Democratic Junta of Spain until it ended in February 1975 to go on to form part of the Democratic Convergence Platform which fused with the Democratic Junta in the Democratic Co-ordination in March 1976.

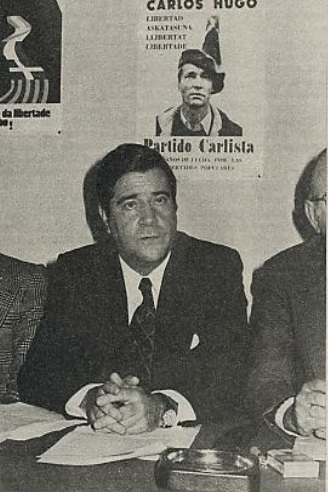
José María Zavala

It was not able to participate in the first democratic elections of 1977 as it did not secure official recognition as a party on time. On the other hand, Prince Sixtus Henry of Bourbon-Parma gave his support to remnant elements loyal to Francoism and with the collaboration of international far-right elements he intended to organise an alternative Carlism to the Carlist Party and of the far-right with strong support from New Force. After meeting some of his followers, they went to disrupt and intimidate in full force their opposition carrying out a terrorist aggression in the annual Carlist concentration of Montejurra in 1976, which ended with the death of two Carlist partisans.

After supporting the Spanish Constitution of 1978, the Carlist Party suffered an internal crisis with a split into nationalist and left-wing parties. In the 1979 Spanish general election, the party obtained 50,552 votes (0.28%) and remained without parliamentary representation. The best results they obtained were in Navarre with 7.72% and the Basque Country with 0.65%. Because of the electoral infighting, its general secretary Zavala resigned following the rest of the directors between Carlos Carnicero and Josep Carles Clemente. In April of that year, it obtained 12,165 votes (4.79%) in the elections for the Parliament of Navarre, obtaining one representative (who did not attend the parliamentary sessions). In November 1979, Carlos Hugo renounced the presidency and in April 1980 was lowered down in the party (even though he did not reject his dynastic rights to the Spanish Crown, the pretence from which he held since the abdication of his father in 1975), which happened to be testimonial in Spanish political life.

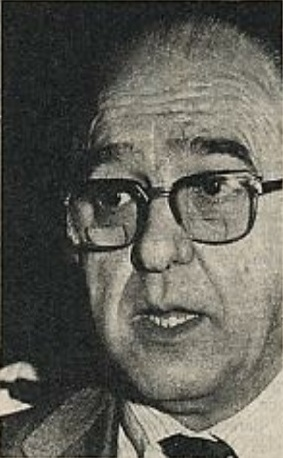
Mariano Zufia

Mariano Zufia, general secretary of the Carlist Party of Euskal Herria and Navarrese member of parliament, assumed the post of General Secretary of the Carlist Party. In 1986, he was one of the forces that gave origin to United Left, even though he walked out of the coalition in 1987. The Carlist Party missed attending the majority of later electoral processes due to funds and militancy failures. In 1989, it was one of the political parties and signing associations of the Pact of Estella; in 2005, the party campaigned against the European Constitution.

The Carlist Party has continued to oppose both main political parties in Spain, the People's Party and the Spanish Socialist Workers' Party.

=== Ideology ===
The Carlist Party's ideology is motivated by Catholic social teaching and the Christian Left, but it does not limit its membership to practicing Catholics due to what it calls "the reality of the secularization of modern society". It derives its rejections of modern society from these Catholic principles. It defines itself as part of the "New Left" that rejects the Soviet state-managed economy in favor of a democratization of the market through cooperatives and trade unions. The Carlists derive their criticism of capitalism from opposition to Liberal individualism in favor of Catholic Personalism.

The Carlist Party supports democracy and socialism, seeing them as a bulwark against both fascism and liberalism (with which it identifies capitalism) respectively. It supports a number of social justice causes, such as the legalization of homosexuality and ethnic minority rights, but justifying these things from a Catholic, rather than secular liberal, perspective.

== Federated parties ==
- Carlist Party of Euskal Herria
- Carlist Party of Aragon
- Carlist Party of Catalonia
- Carlist Party of the Kingdom of León
- Carlist Party of Asturias
- Carlist Party of the Valencian Country
- Carlist Party of Murcia
