= Montejurra =

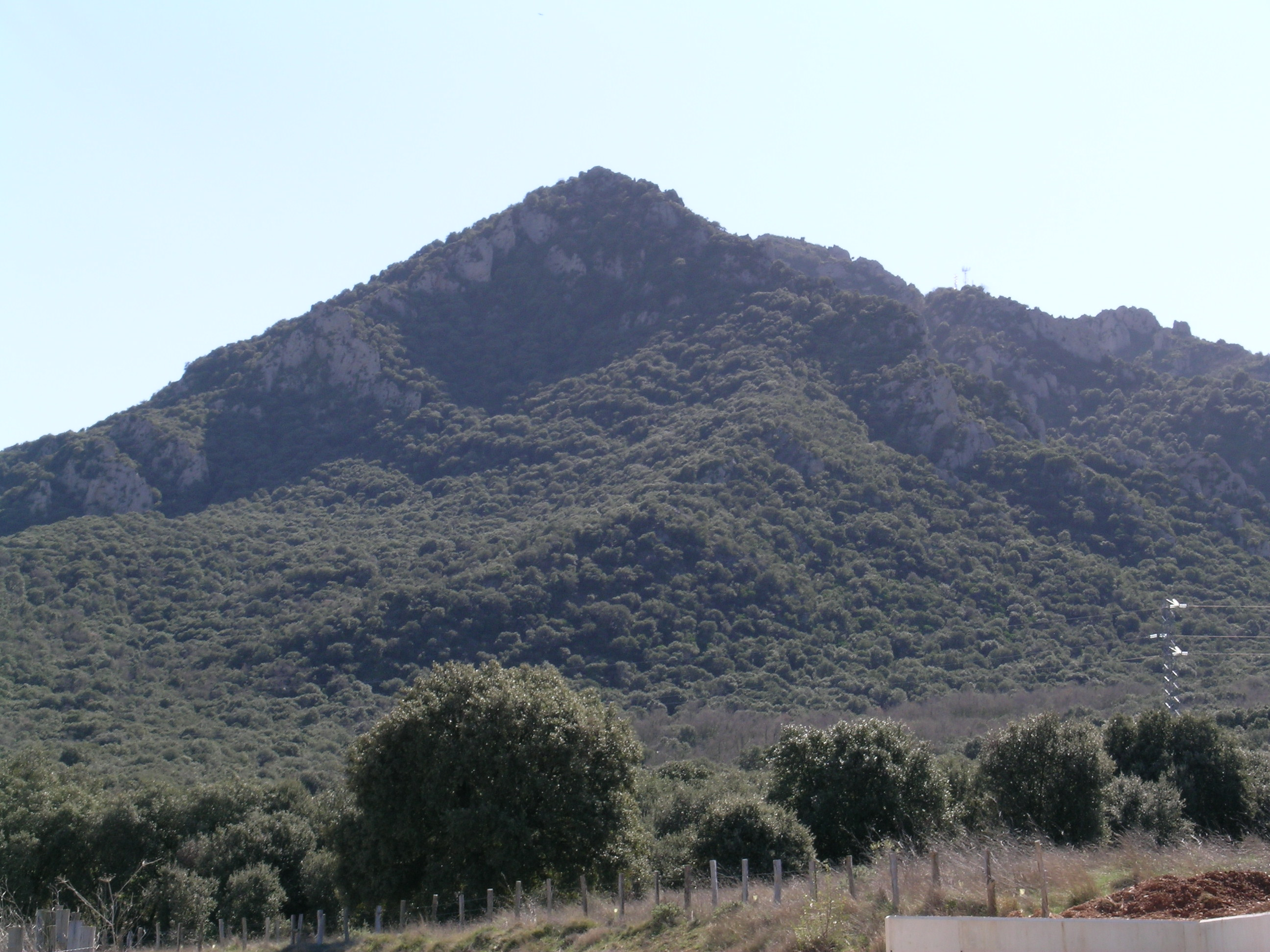
- View of Montejurra from the Monastery of Irache

Highest point
- Elevation: 1,042 m (3,419 ft)
- Prominence: 484 m (1,588 ft)
- Coordinates: 42°37′52″N 02°02′41″W

Geography
- Location within Spain
- Location: Navarre, Spain
- Parent range: Basque Mountains

Montejurra in Spanish and Jurramendi in Basque are the names of a mountain in Navarre region (Spain). Each year, it hosts a Carlist celebration in remembrance of the 1873 Battle of Montejurra during the Third Carlist War. In 2004, approximately 1,000 persons turned out.

Between 1960 and 1971, the Carlists published a monthly magazine named Montejurra.

On 9 May 1976, during the Spanish Transition, far right-wing gunmen supported by the Spanish secret services, killed two people at a ceremony held by the left-wing Carlist Party. This became known as the Montejurra Incidents. The Carlist Party organizes an annual gathering at Montejurra, where Carlists and other leftists honor the dead.
