= 1978 Spanish constitutional referendum =

- 6 December 1978
- Do you approve of the Constitution Bill?
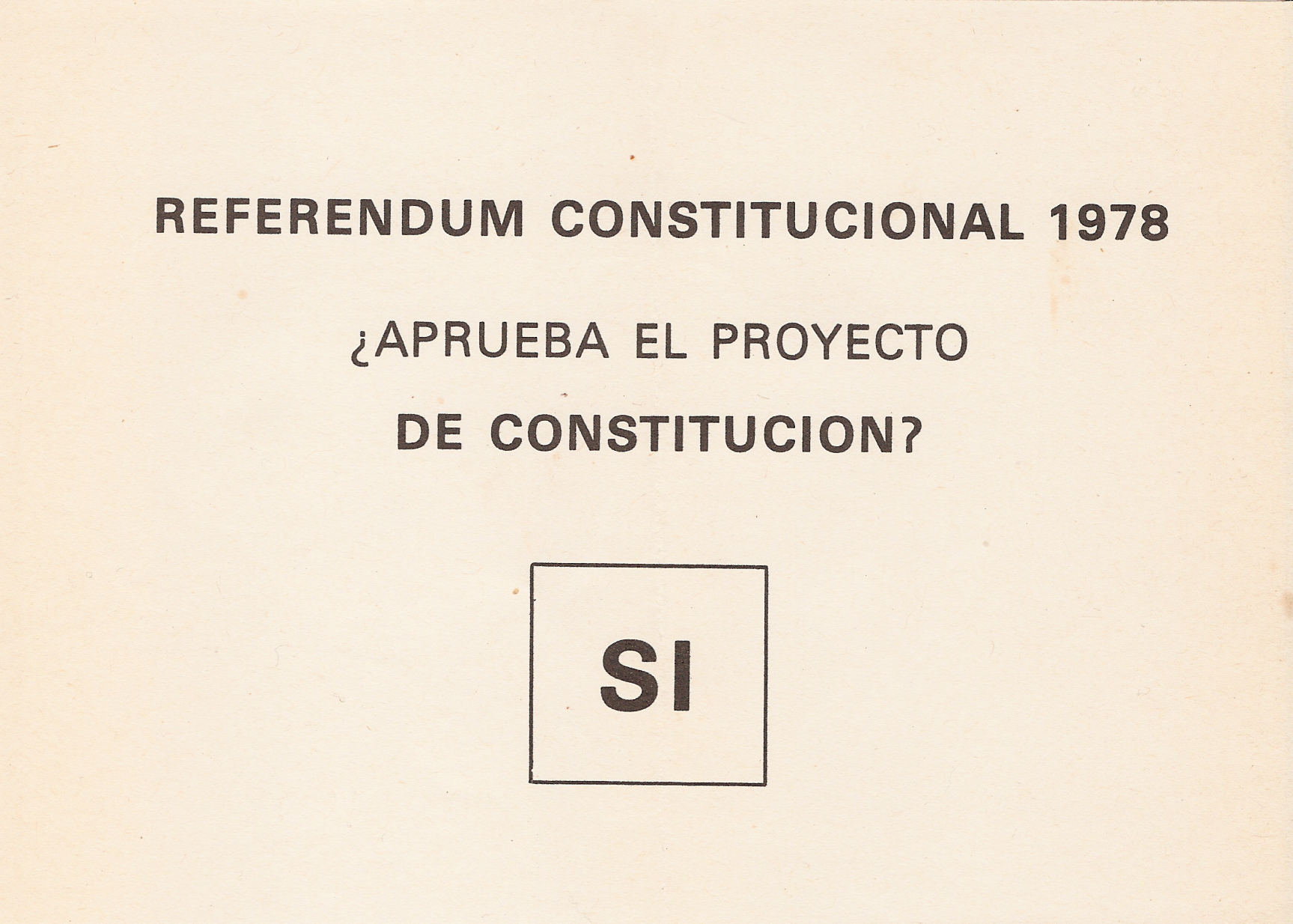
- The referendum ballot

Results
Choice	Votes	%
Yes	15,706,078	91.81%
No	1,400,505	8.19%
Valid votes	17,106,583	95.71%
Invalid or blank votes	766,688	4.29%
Total votes	17,873,271	100.00%
Registered voters/turnout	26,632,180	67.11%

A constitutional referendum was held in Spain on Wednesday, 6 December 1978, for approval or rejection of the proposed Spanish Constitution. The new constitution had been approved by the Cortes Generales on 31 October 1978, with the provision that the new law had to be approved by Spanish voters as well. The question asked was "Do you approve of the Constitution Bill?" (Spanish: ¿Aprueba el Proyecto de Constitución?). The referendum resulted in 92% of valid votes in support of the bill on a turnout of 67%.

== Purpose ==
The new constitution was intended to replace the many constitutional laws of the Franco era, the Fundamental Laws of the Realm, and turn Spain into a constitutional monarchy by removing many of the King's powers. The feat of creating a democratic system without breaking the structures of power of the state was made possible by the approval of the Political Reform Law, passed by the Francoist Cortes as the last Fundamental Law in 1977. It had been drafted by the President of the Cortes Españolas, Torcuato Fernández-Miranda (including changes that would replace the Cortes Españolas with a Cortes Generales), and supported by Prime Minister Adolfo Suárez and King Juan Carlos I. The law provided for the legalization of political parties and a democratic election to Constituent Cortes, a committee of which then drafted the Constitution.

== Conduct ==
Some Spanish media found an irregularity rate of up to 30% in the census in certain provinces, with many people allegedly being unable to vote while others voted twice. Adolfo Suárez's government had lowered the voting age from 21 to 18 only three weeks before the referendum, which resulted in a made-up electoral register increasing by over 3 million people compared to the 1977 general election amid technical, administrative and logistical issues. Interior Ministry officials acknowledged deviations of up to 5.1 per 100 in the electoral census—roughly 1.5 million people according to the National Institute of Statistics—resulting from the absence of an official electoral register and an overreliance on data from municipal registers.

== Results ==
Choice	Votes	%
For	15,706,078	91.81
Against	1,400,505	8.19
Total	17,106,583	100.00
Valid votes	17,106,583	95.71
Invalid votes	133,786	0.75
Blank votes	632,902	3.54
Total votes	17,873,271	100.00
Registered voters/turnout	26,632,180	67.11
Source: Ministry of the Interior

=== Results by region ===
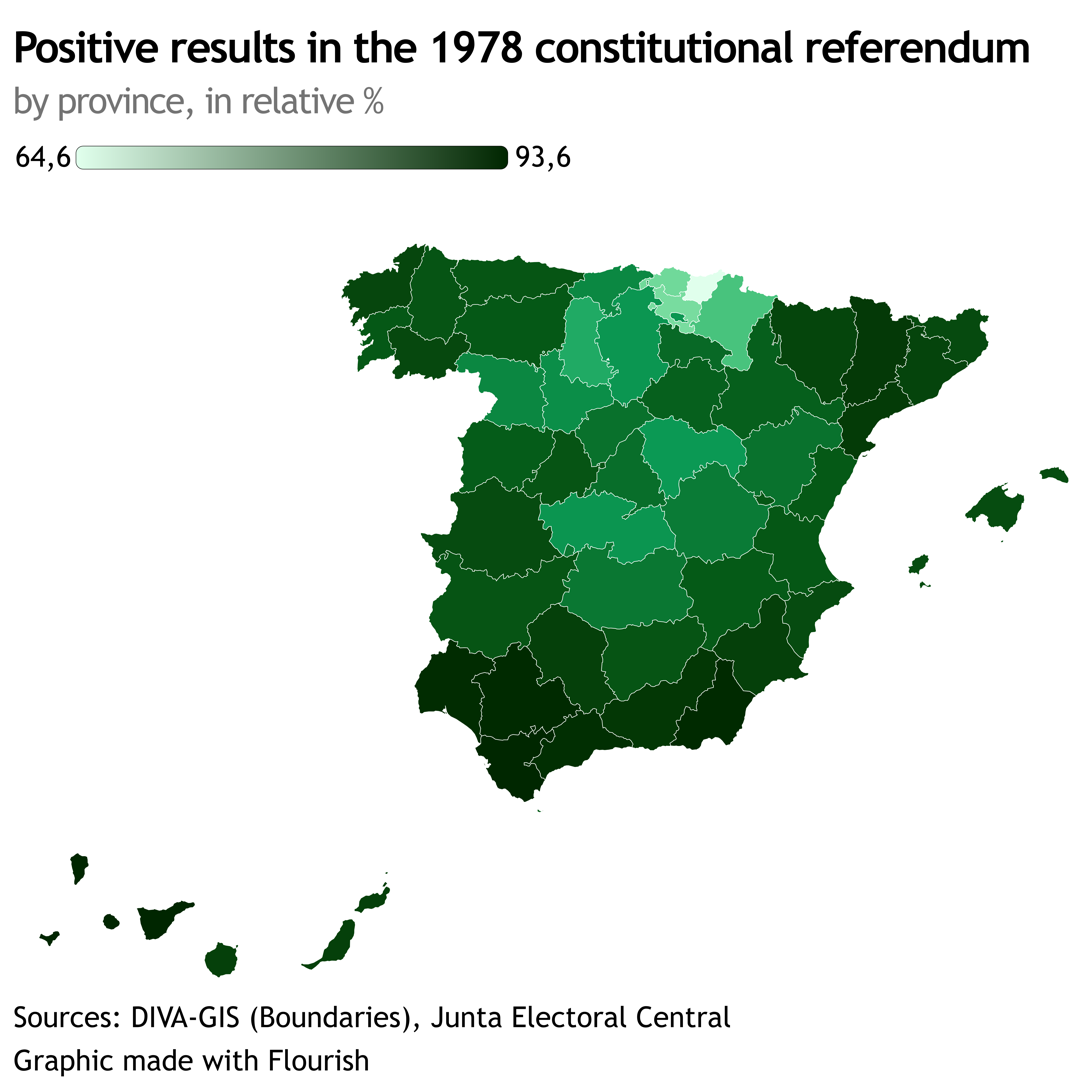
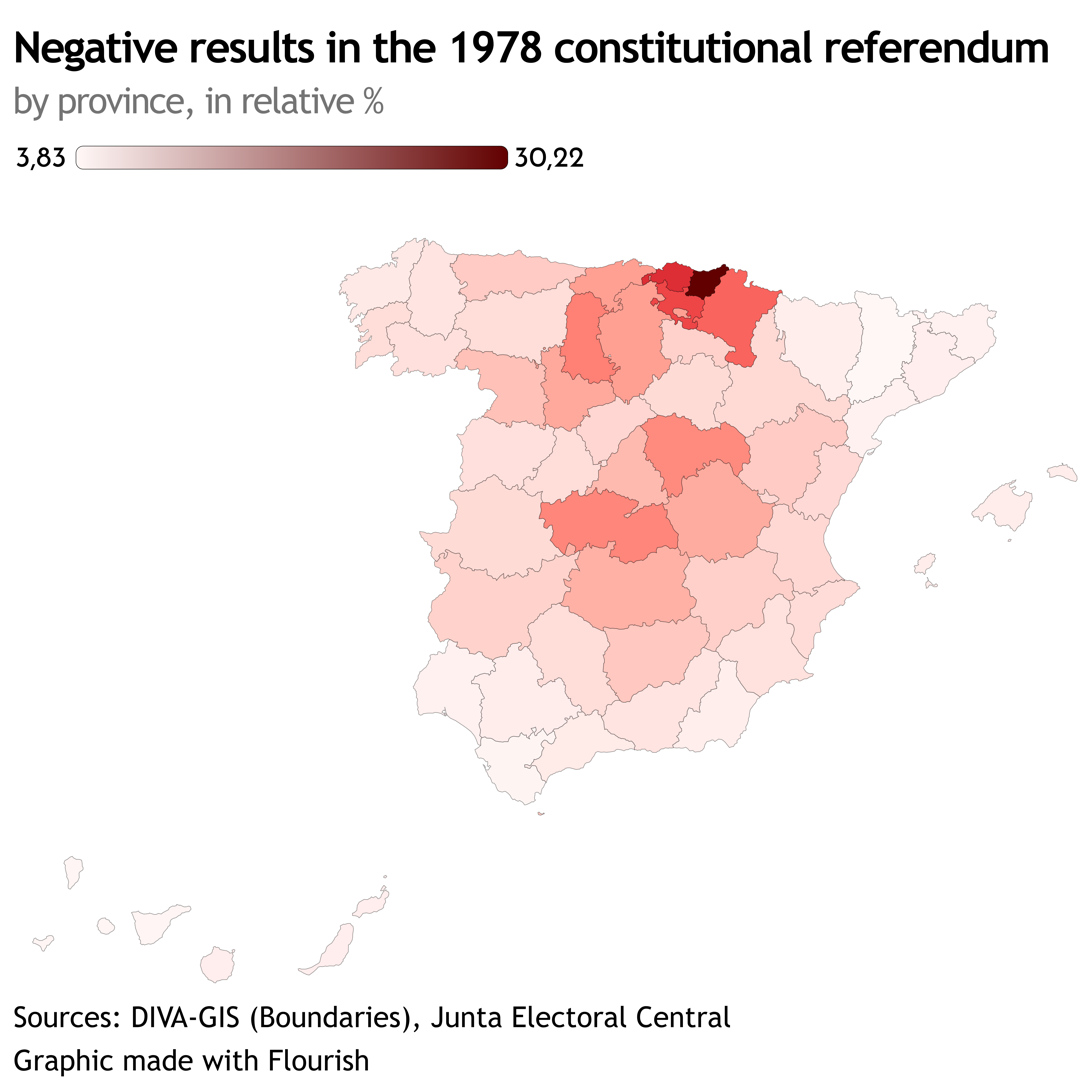

Region	Electorate	Turnout	Yes		No	
Region	Electorate	Turnout	Votes	%	Votes	%
Andalusia	4,347,542	69.51	2,775,521	94.36	165,882	5.64
Aragon	894,403	73.58	579,734	92.90	44,287	7.10
Asturias	864,796	61.79	473,348	91.34	44,874	8.66
Balearic Islands	450,115	70.18	282,598	94.88	15,251	5.12
Basque Country	1,552,737	44.65	479,205	74.60	163,191	25.40
Canary Islands	879,963	62.90	508,668	95.46	24,174	4.54
Cantabria	374,559	71.15	222,559	87.01	33,232	12.99
Castile and León	1,950,813	71.37	1,184,361	90.28	127,545	9.72
Castilla–La Mancha	1,207,525	73.82	751,614	87.74	105,034	12.26
Catalonia	4,398,173	67.91	2,701,870	95.15	137,845	4.85
Extremadura	765,235	70.51	481,808	92.40	39,637	7.60
Galicia	2,107,613	50.20	942,097	93.84	61,892	6.16
La Rioja	192,597	72.46	120,847	91.70	10,940	8.30
Madrid	3,047,226	72.23	1,896,205	89.49	222,638	10.51
Murcia	630,268	71.44	408,722	93.59	27,975	6.41
Navarre	361,243	66.63	182,207	81.70	40,804	18.30
Valencian Community	2,545,481	74.14	1,676,680	92.72	131,664	7.28
Total	17,873,271	67.11	15,706,078	91.81	1,400,505	8.19
