= New Melilla =

New Melilla Melilla La Nueva
- Ensanche
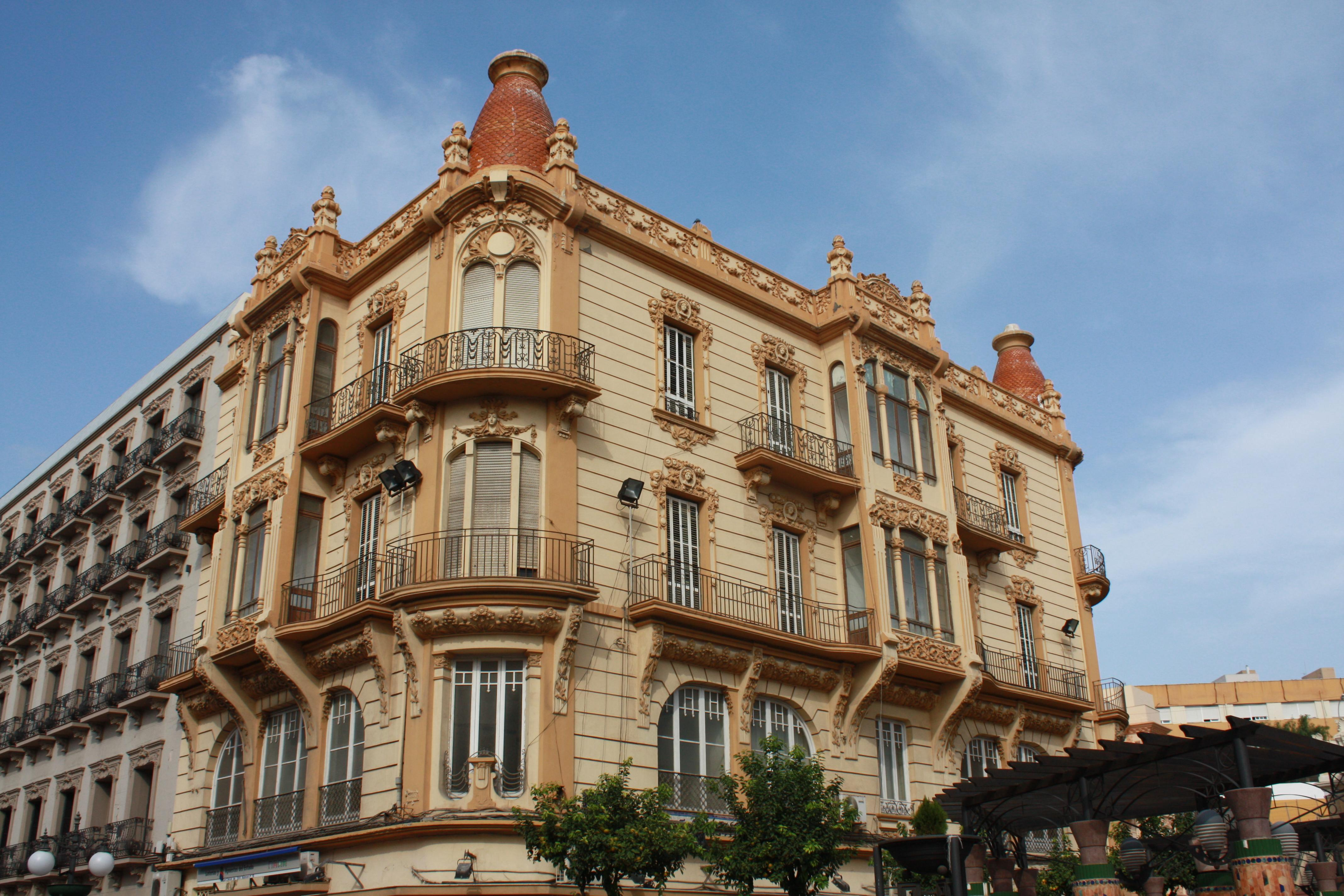
- Interactive map of New Melilla
- Country: Spain
- Autonomous City: Melilla
- Modernist expansion: 1901

New Melilla or Ensanche de Melilla is the expansion of the Spanish city of Melilla that emerged in the late 19th and early 20th centuries.

== History ==
From the end of the 19th century, a period of splendor began in Melilla, creating a modern city. Among Spanish cities, Melilla is second only to Barcelona in its representation of modernist art. The city also has the greatest representation of modernism in Africa.

More than a thousand historically registered buildings are found in the Historic-Artistic Complex of the City of Melilla, a Bien de Interés Cultural, or cultural property of Spain. The buildings are spread throughout the central expansion and its neighborhoods.

Many of the buildings are the work of a Melilla-based architect from the Barcelona School, Enrique Nieto. Nieto, a follower of the architect Lluis Domènech i Montaner produced an extensive body of modernist work. Nieto's floral modernist buildings are especially noteworthy. Other modernist architects in Melilla were Emilio Alzugaray Goicoechea and Tomás Moreno Lázaro. In the 1930s, Art Deco took hold in Melilla's architecture, and architects such as Francisco Hernanz Martínez and Lorenzo Ros Costa created spectacular buildings in the city's neighbourhoods.

== Exterior forts ==
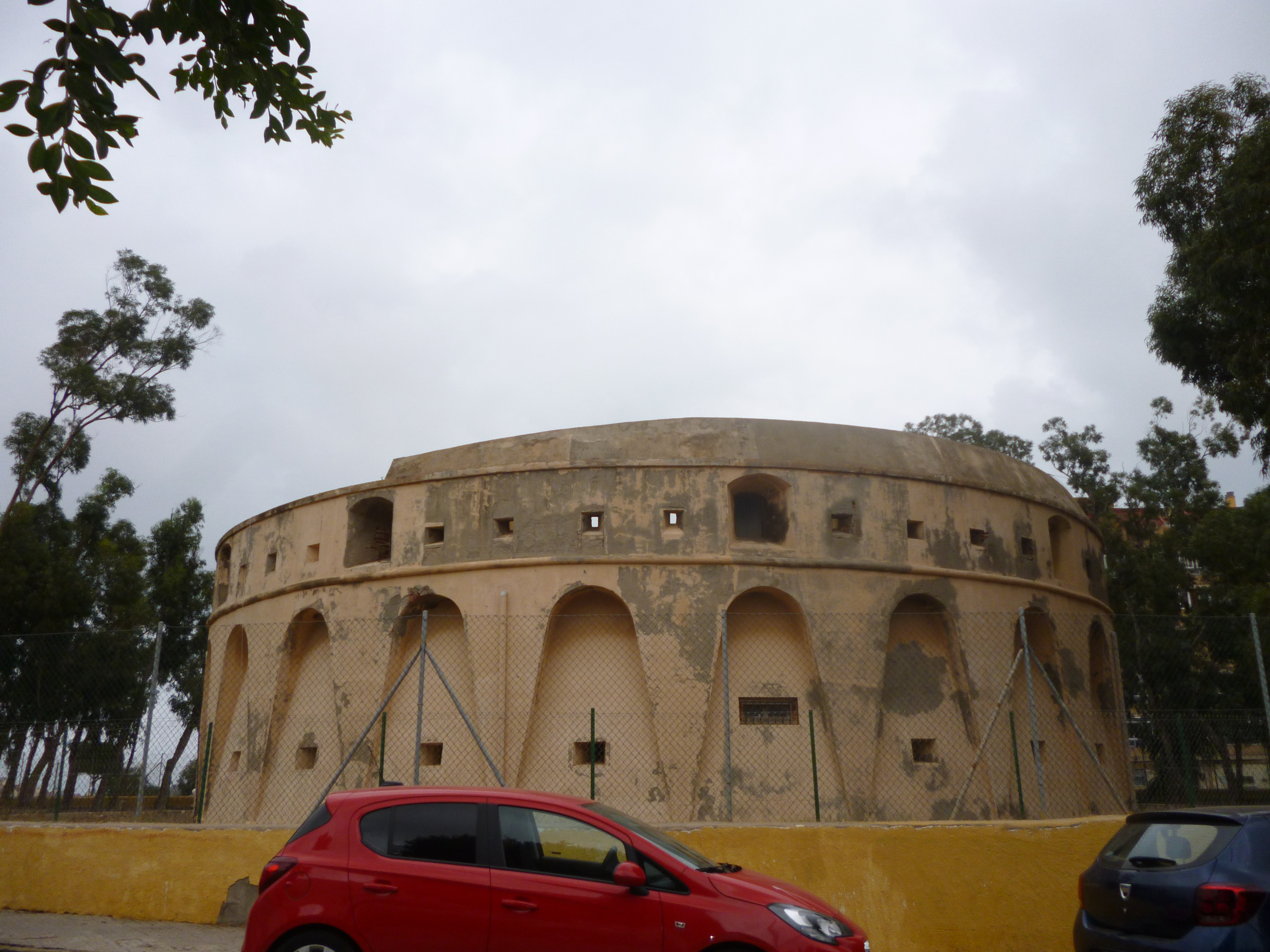
Fuerte de Camellos

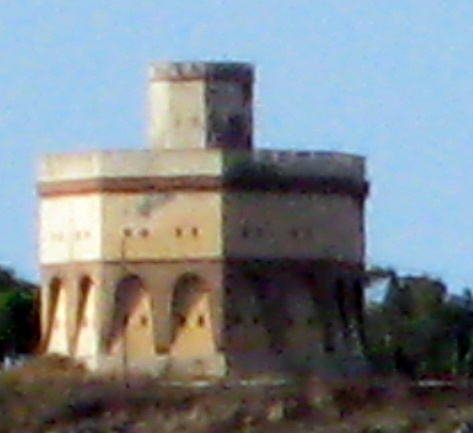
Fortín de Reina Regente

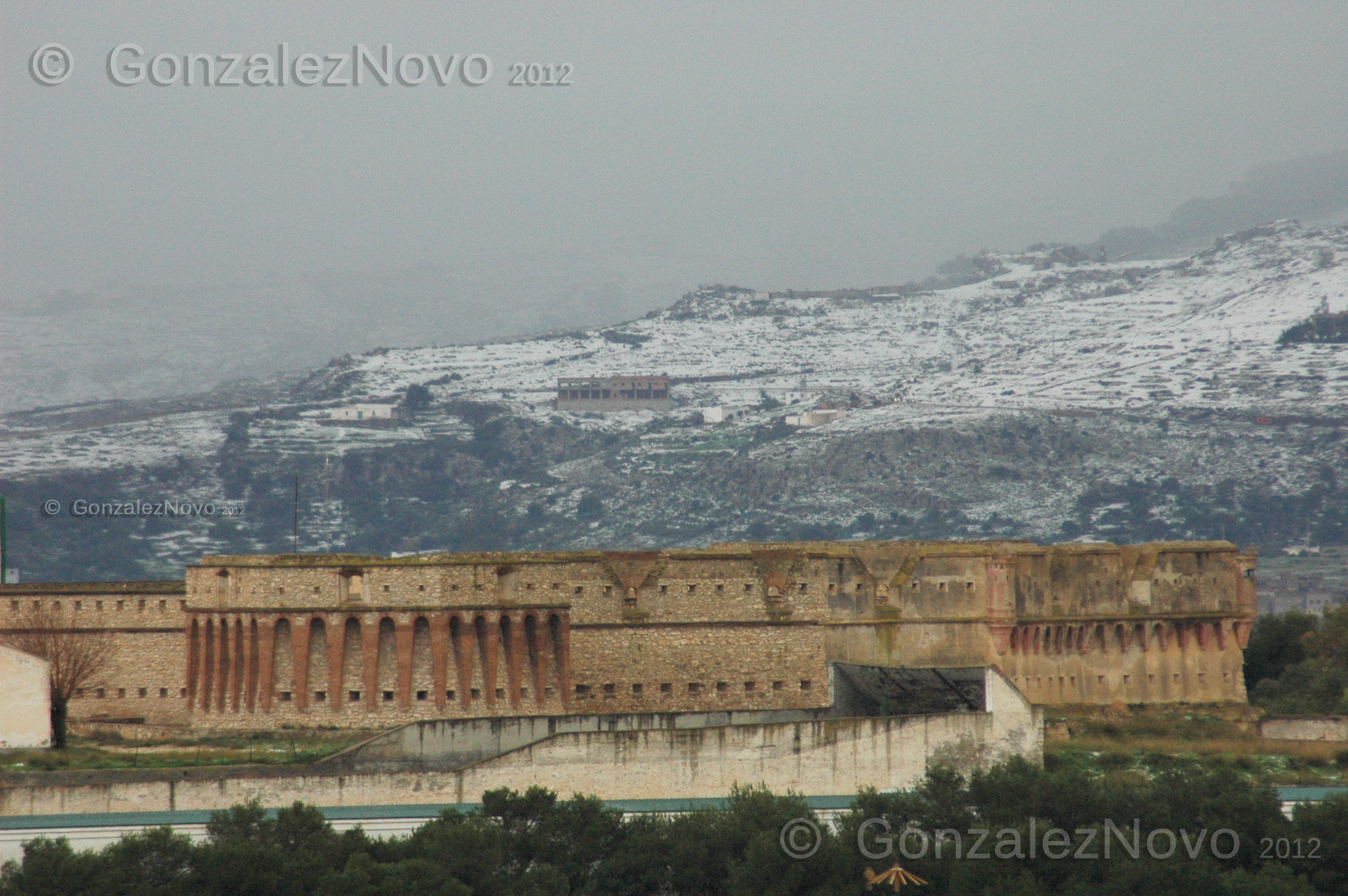
Fuerte de Cabrerizas Altas

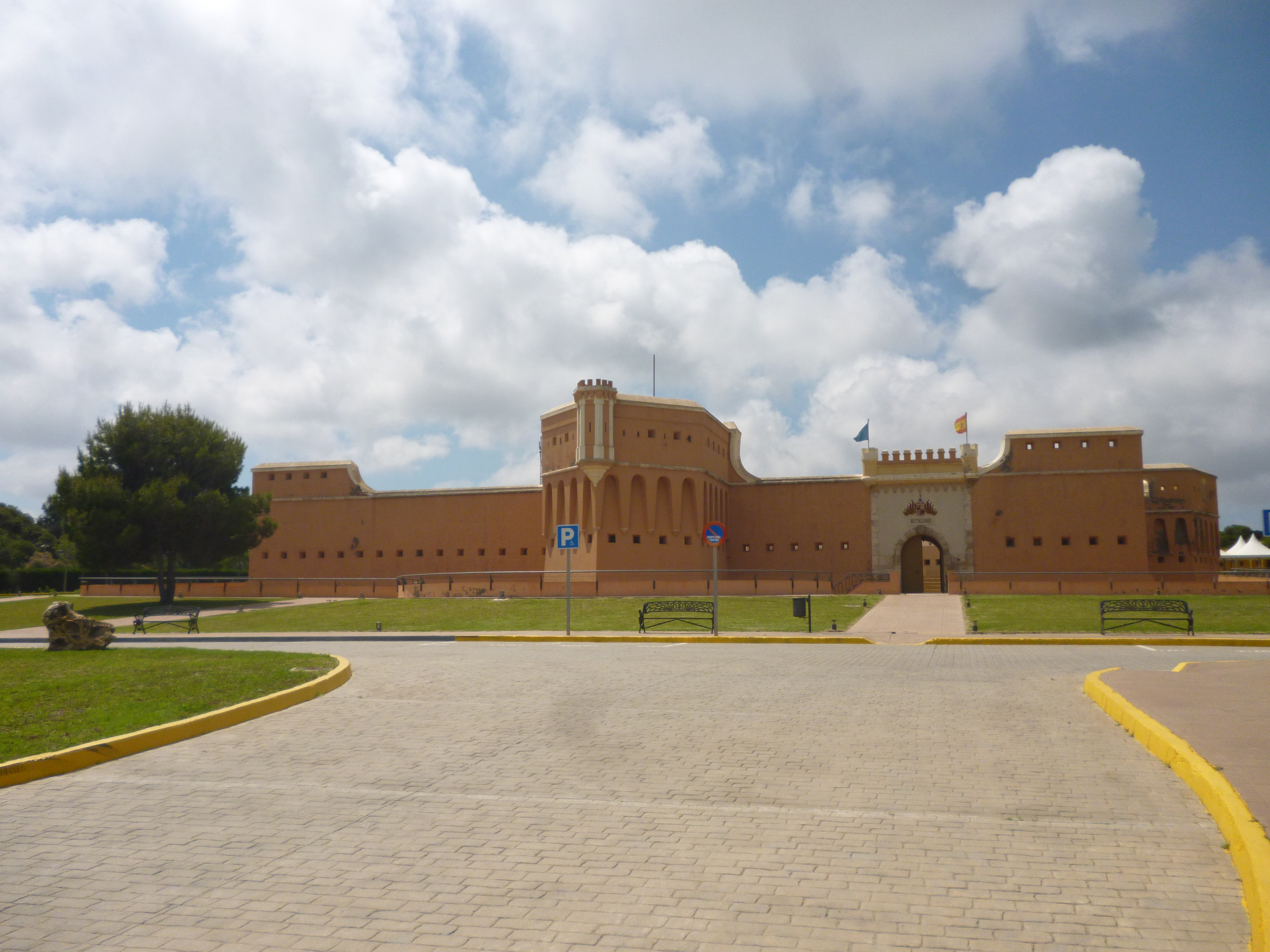
Fuerte de Rostrogordo

Melilla's exterior forts are located at a considerable distance from each other. They were built in the second half of the 19th century in a neo-medieval style, an unusual architectural style for that era in Spain.

They are built with local stone for the walls and bricks for the arches and vaults. These obsolete fortification techniques, incapable of facing modern artillery, were sufficient because the Riffian Kabyle people, the enemy from which they had to defend Melilla, did not have artillery.

== Historicisms ==
In Melilla, historic revival architecture is primarily found in public buildings and places of worship.

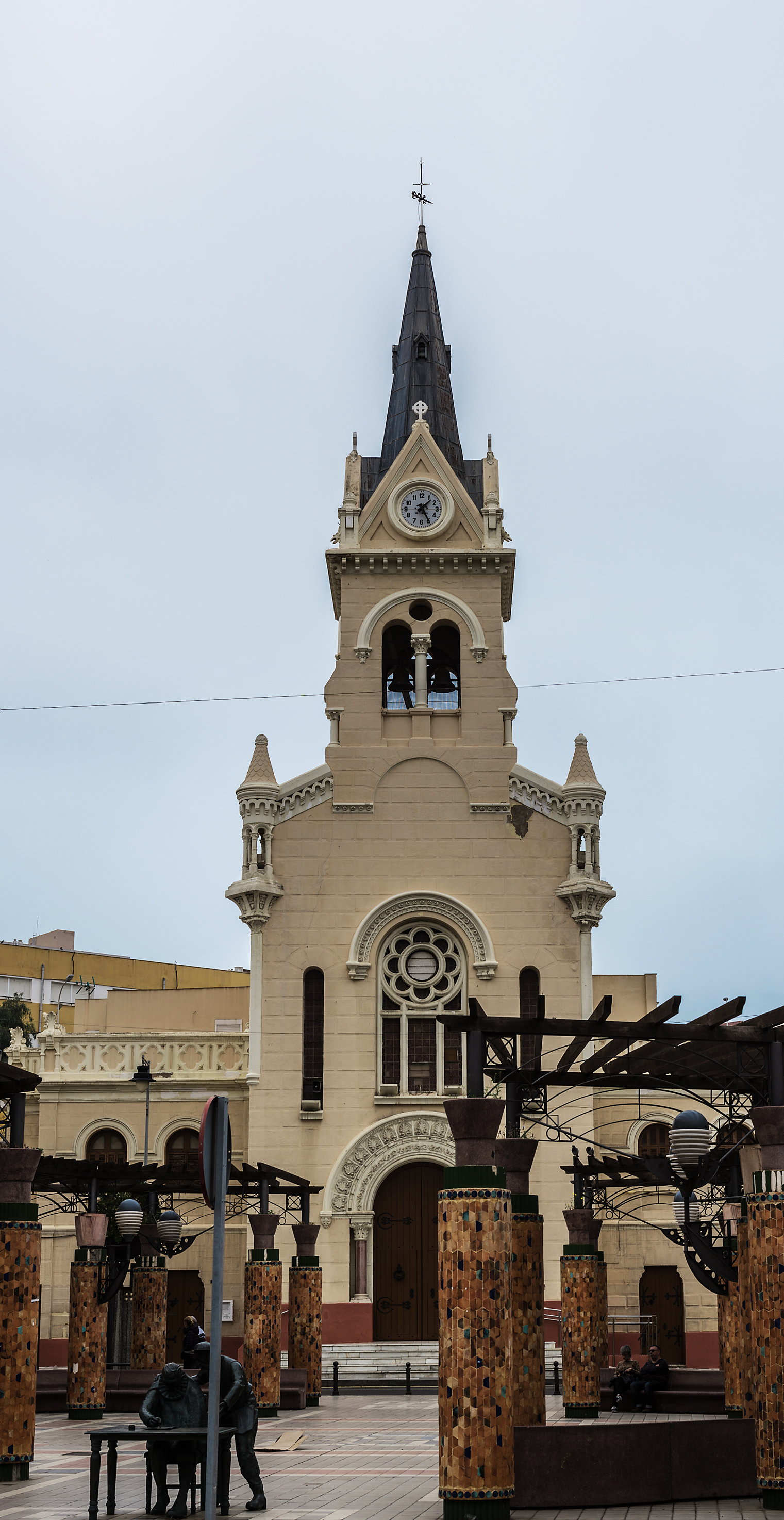
Church of the Sacred Heart, a neo-Romanesque Catholic church

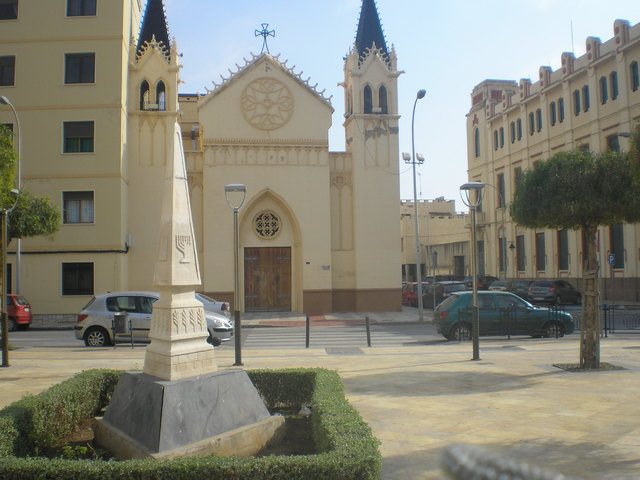
Neogothic Catholic church (rear)

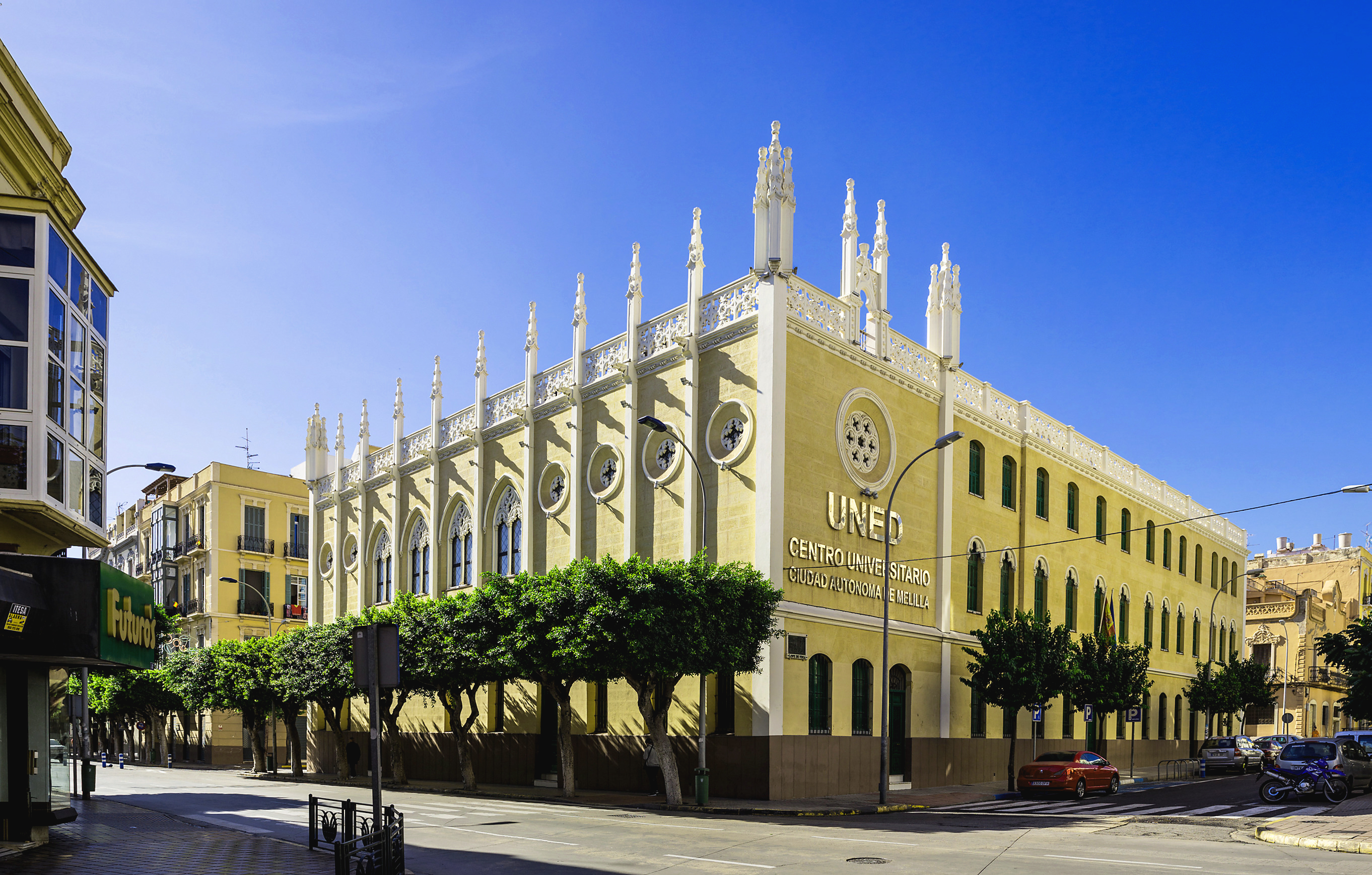
Neogothic building, formerly the College of Good Counsel

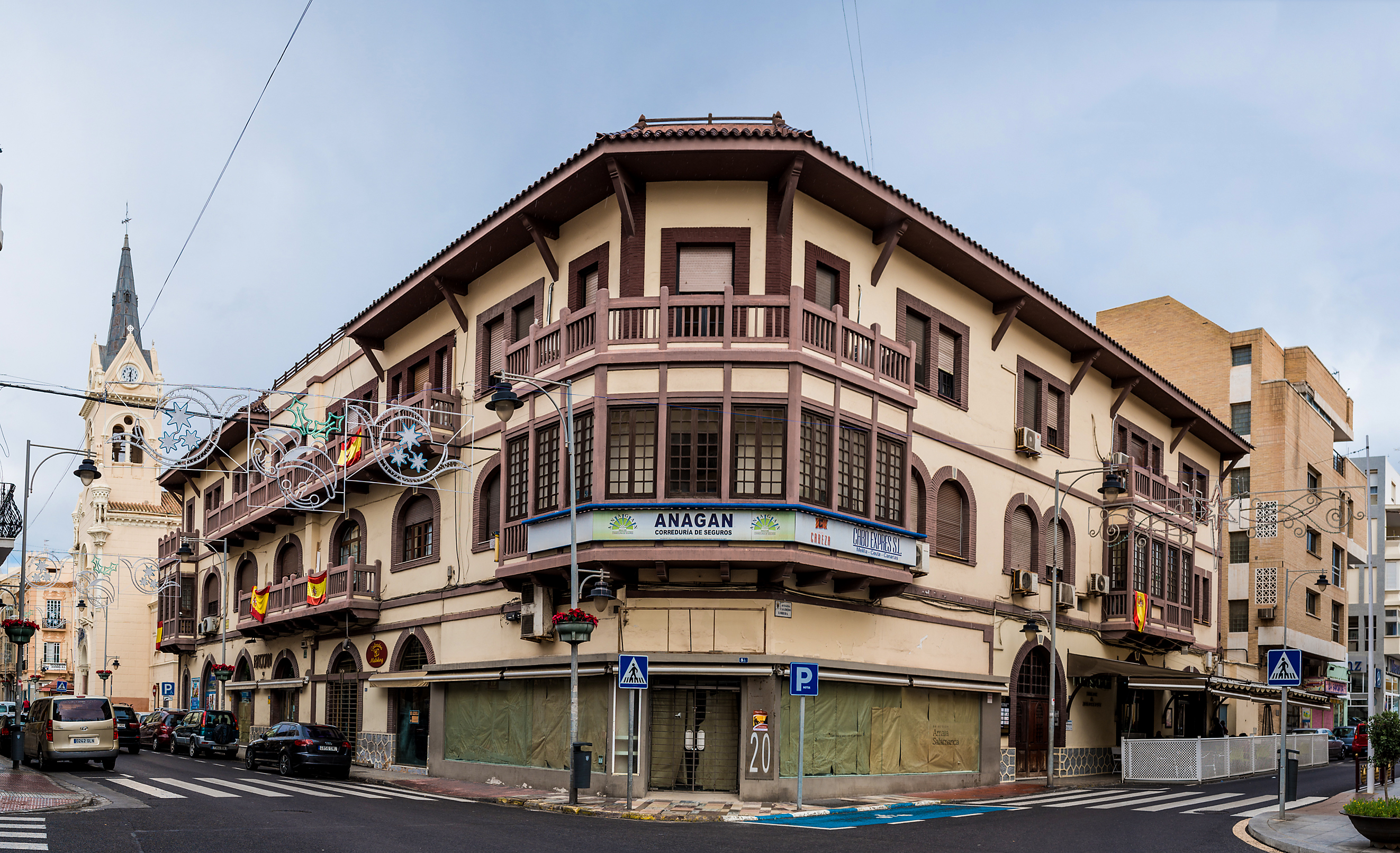
Regional neocolonial building originally for Gaselec, an electric utility,

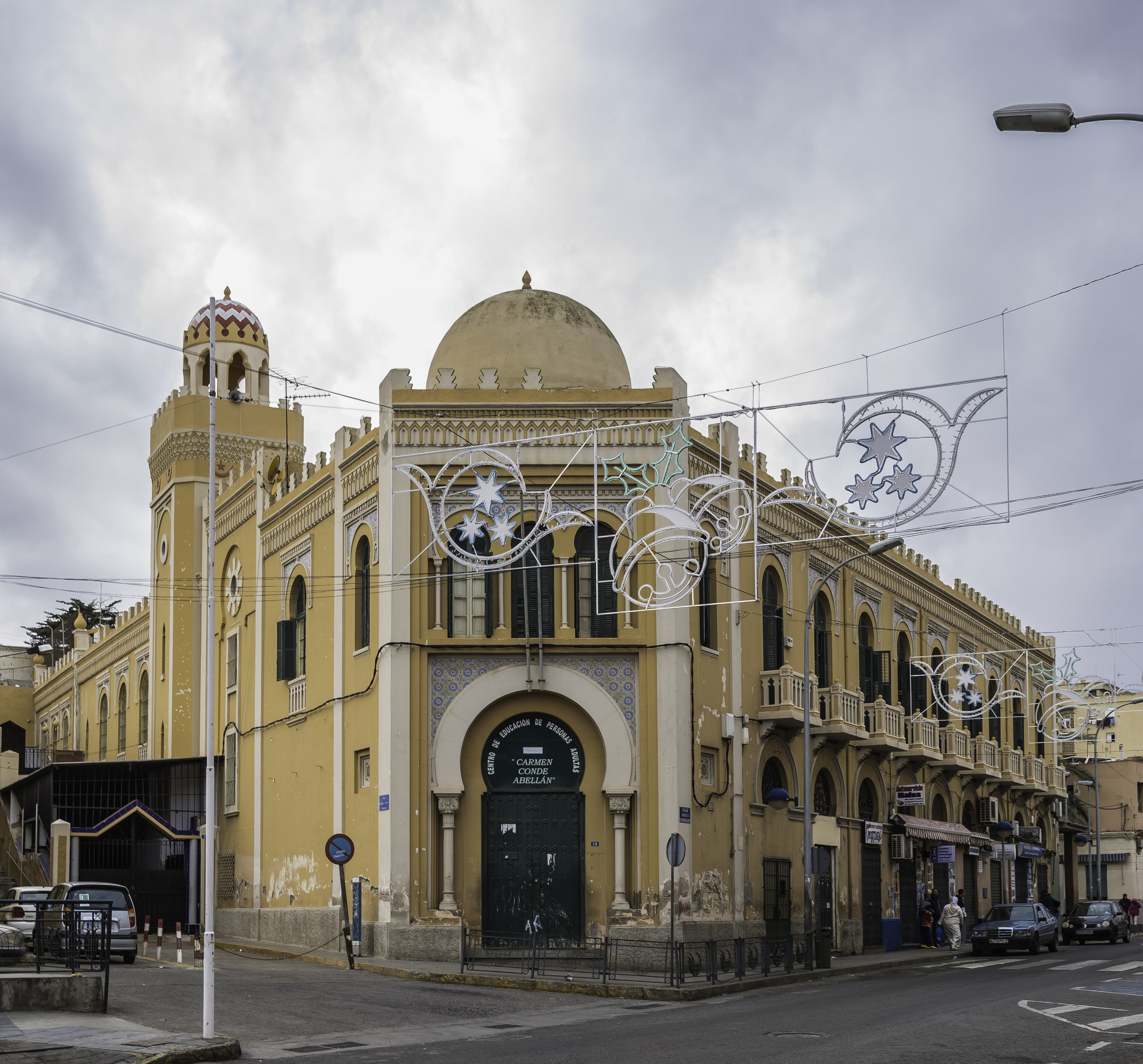
Central Mosque in Mudejar and Arabic styles

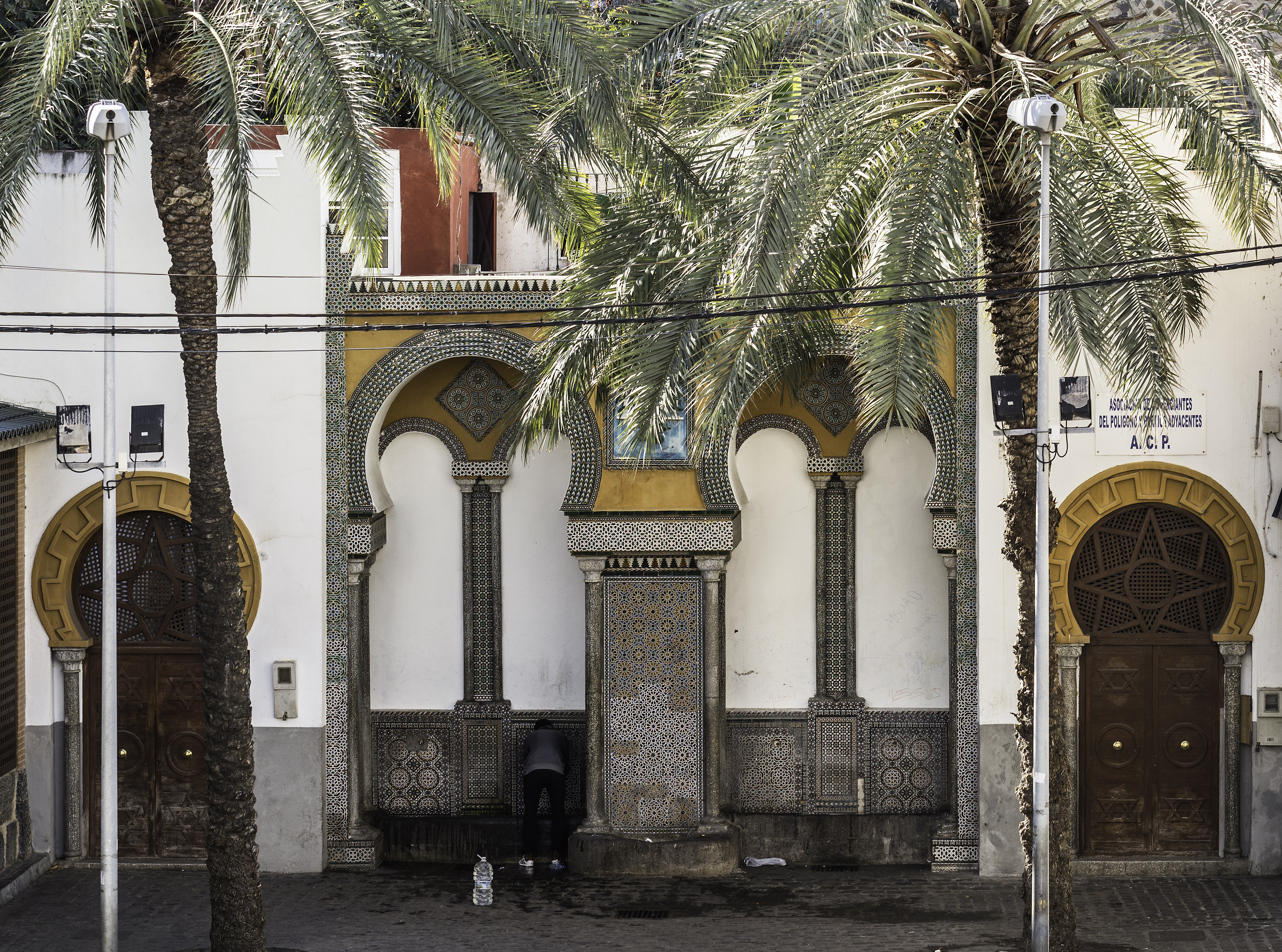
The neo-Arabic Bombillo Fountain

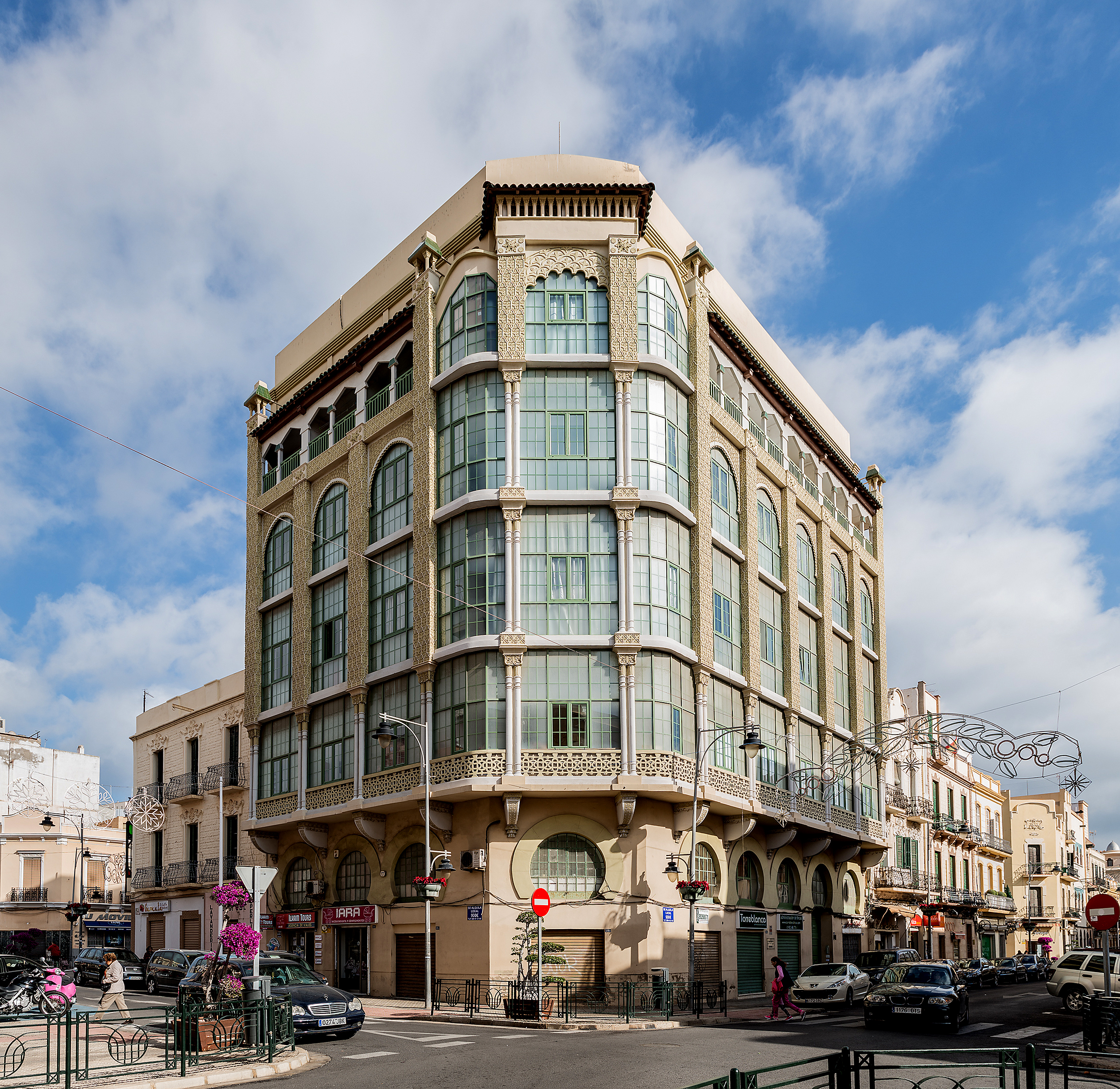
Neo-Arabic House of Crystals

== Eclecticisms ==
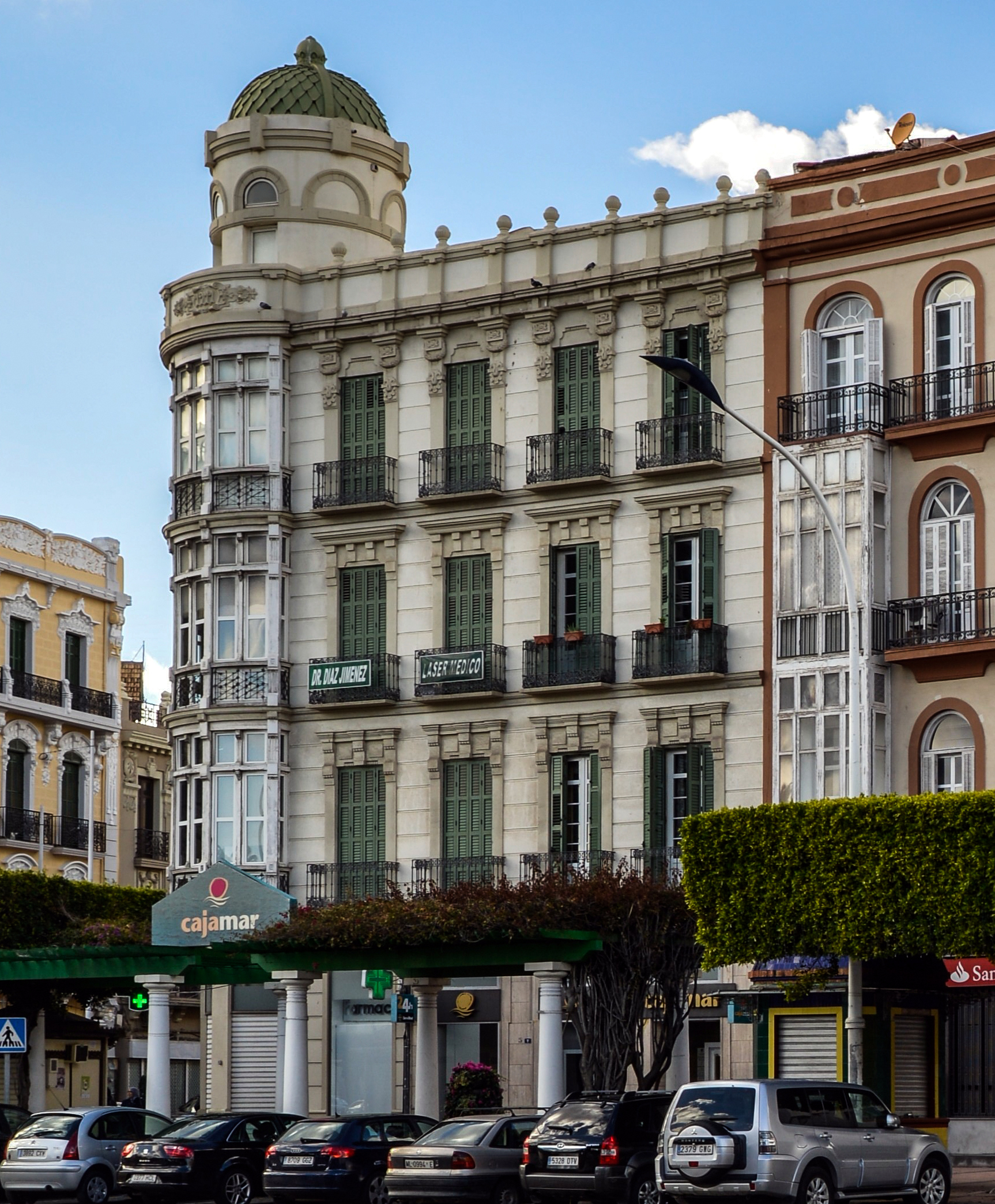
Metropol Building

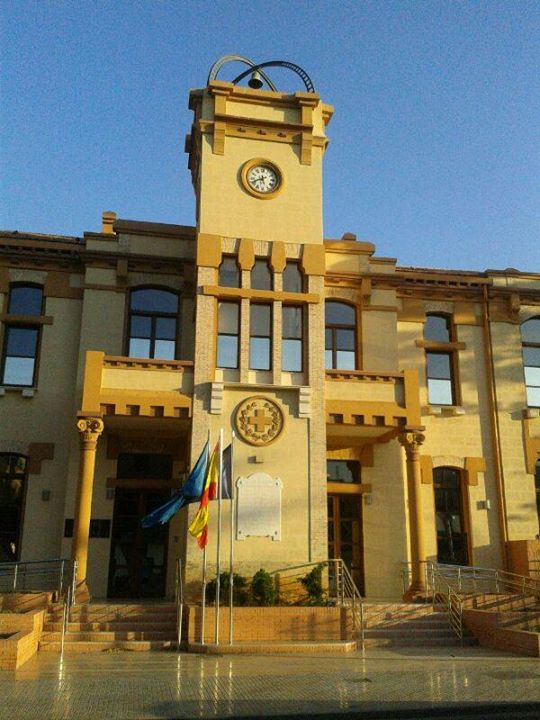
Grupo de Escuelas Mixtas Alfonso XIII

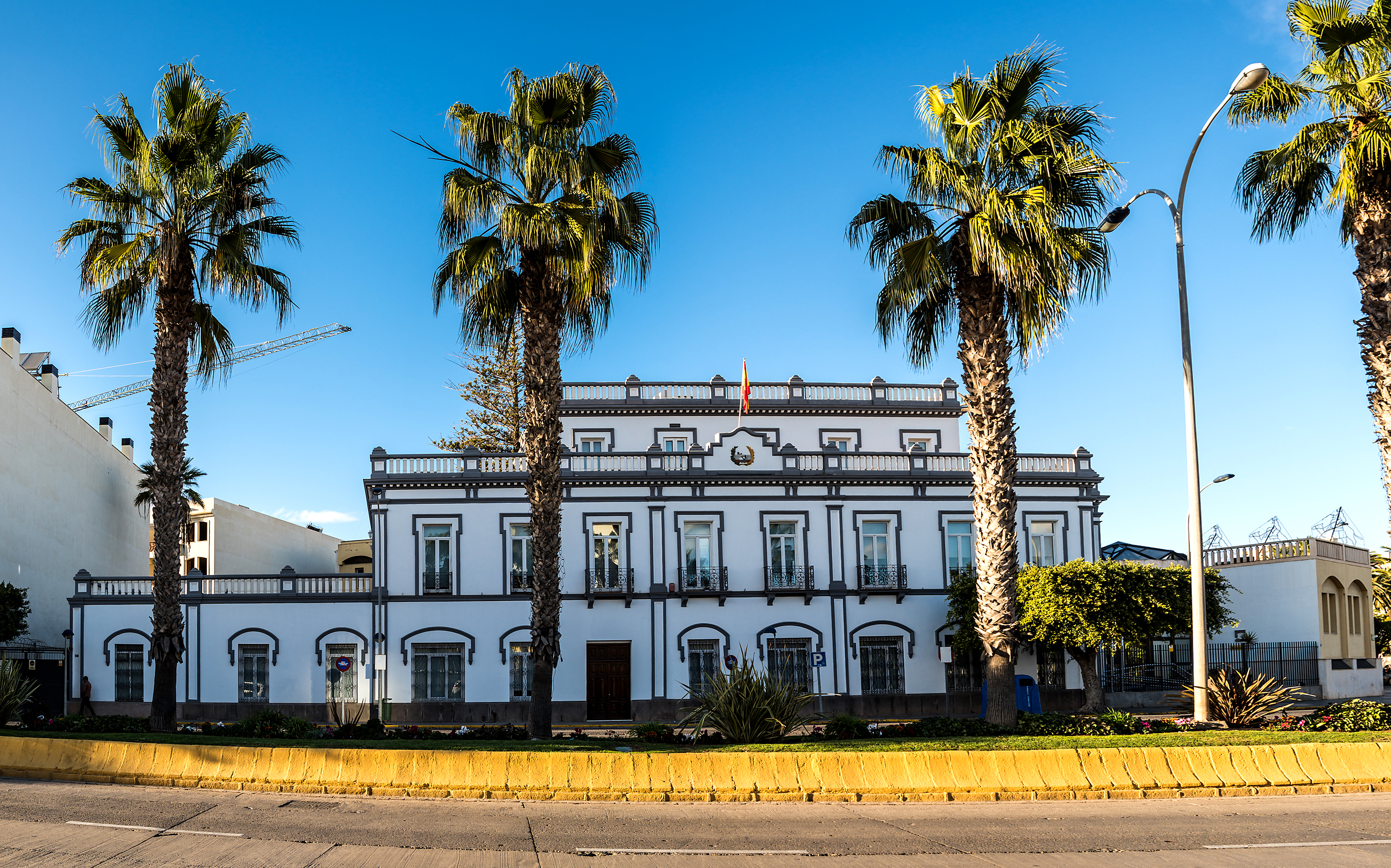
Melilla Port Authority Building

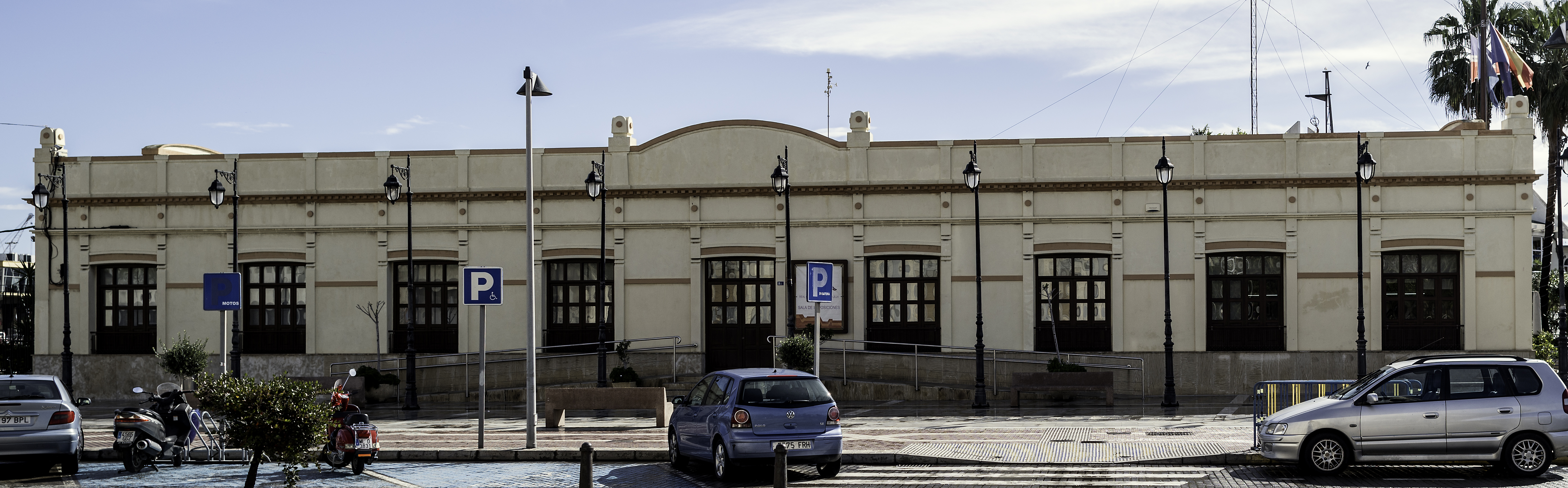
Estación sanitaria del Puerto de Melilla (Former health station of the Port of Melilla)

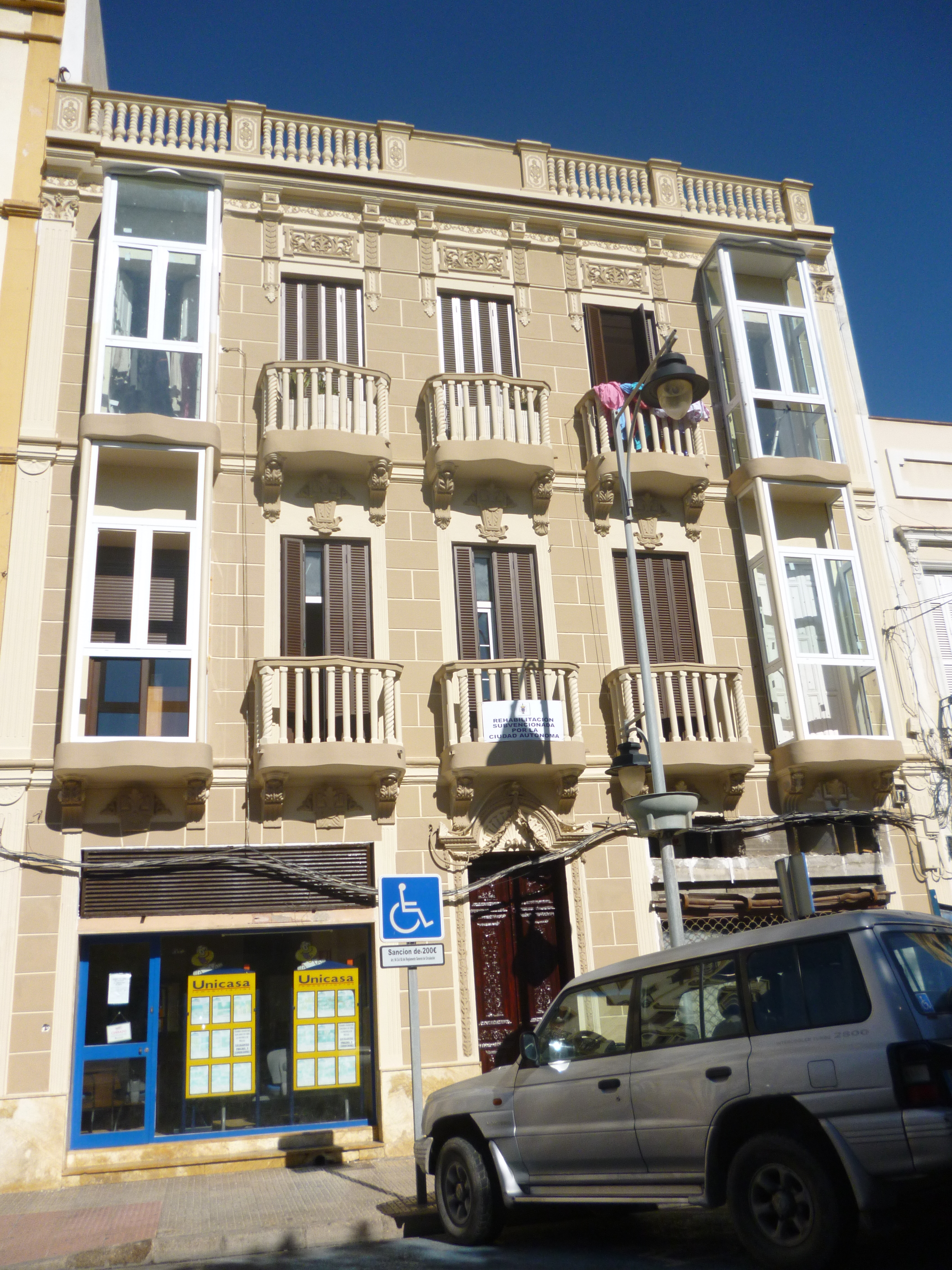
Carmen Balaca's House

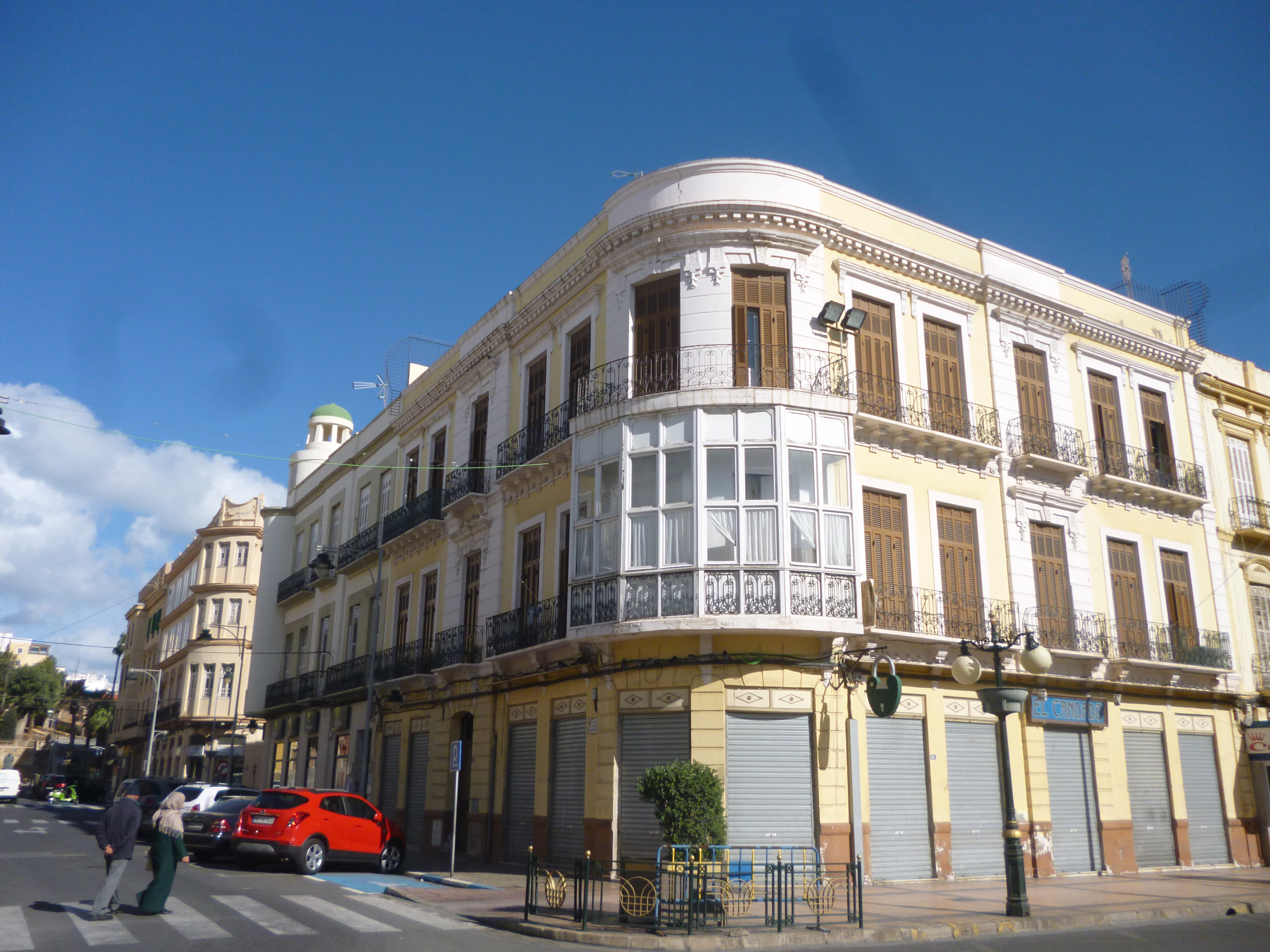
Headquarters of the Civil Society La Constructora

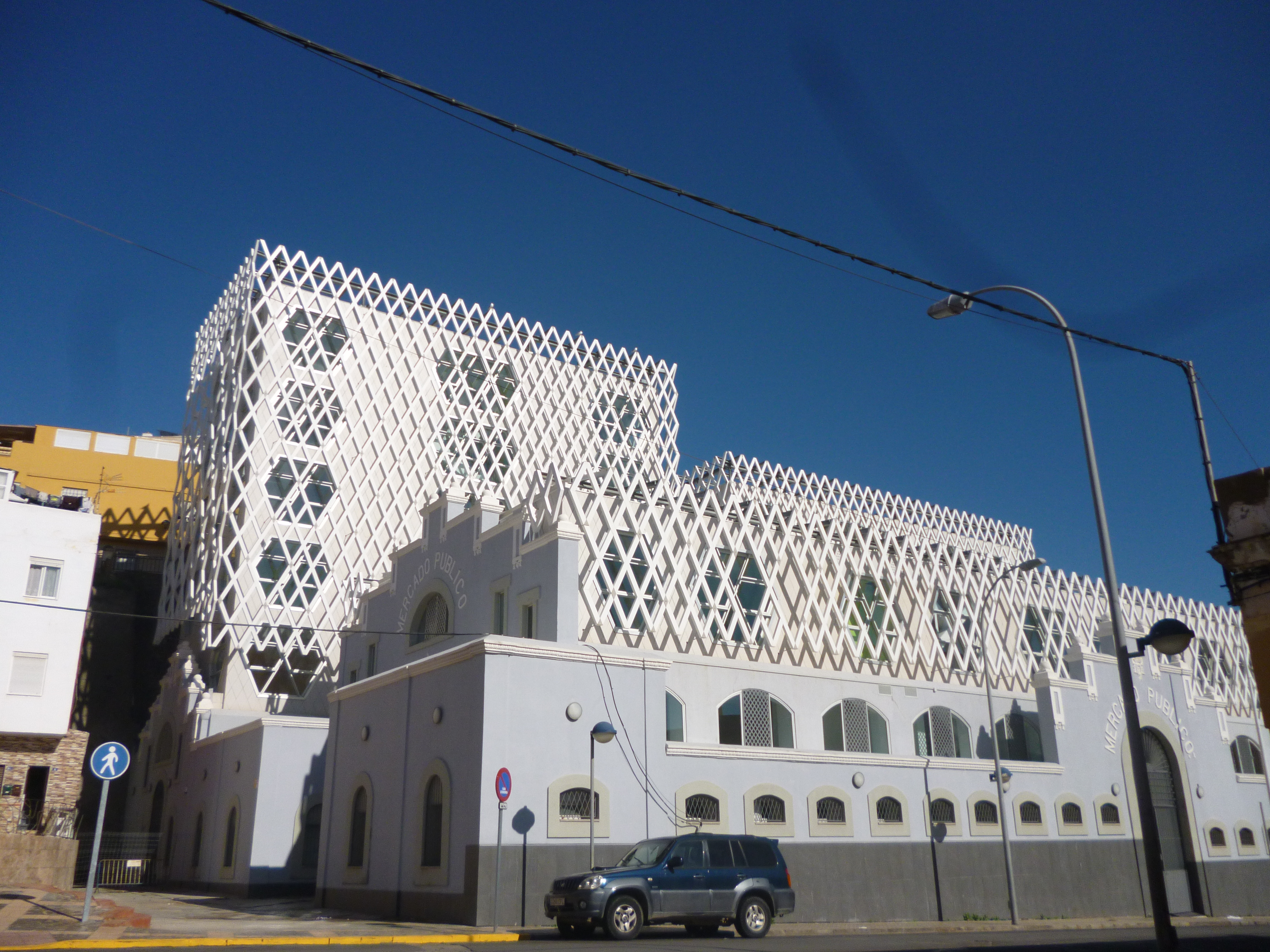
Polígono Market

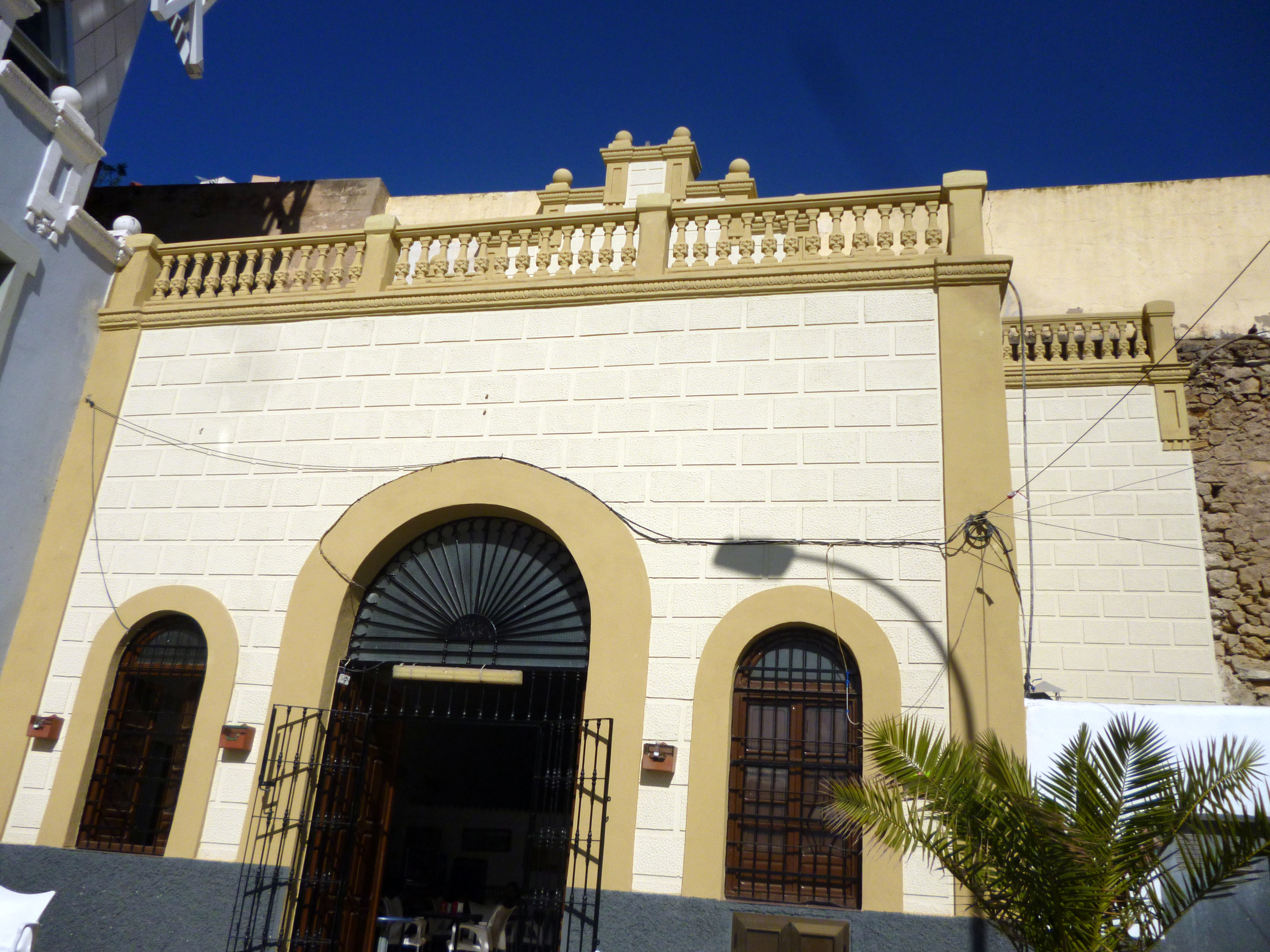
Polígono Market

Eclecticism in Melilla mixes rigid structural elements with richer ornamentation, such as wrought iron and flying cornices. The most notable practitioner of eclecticism in Melilla was Droctoveo Castañón, who primarily built private residences.

== Modernism ==
New Melilla's architecture is defined by modernism, a continuation of the Rococo style, with rich ornamentation, a variety of evocative shapes and varied colors.

=== Enrique Nieto ===
Enrique Nieto is credited with introducing modernist architecture to Melilla.

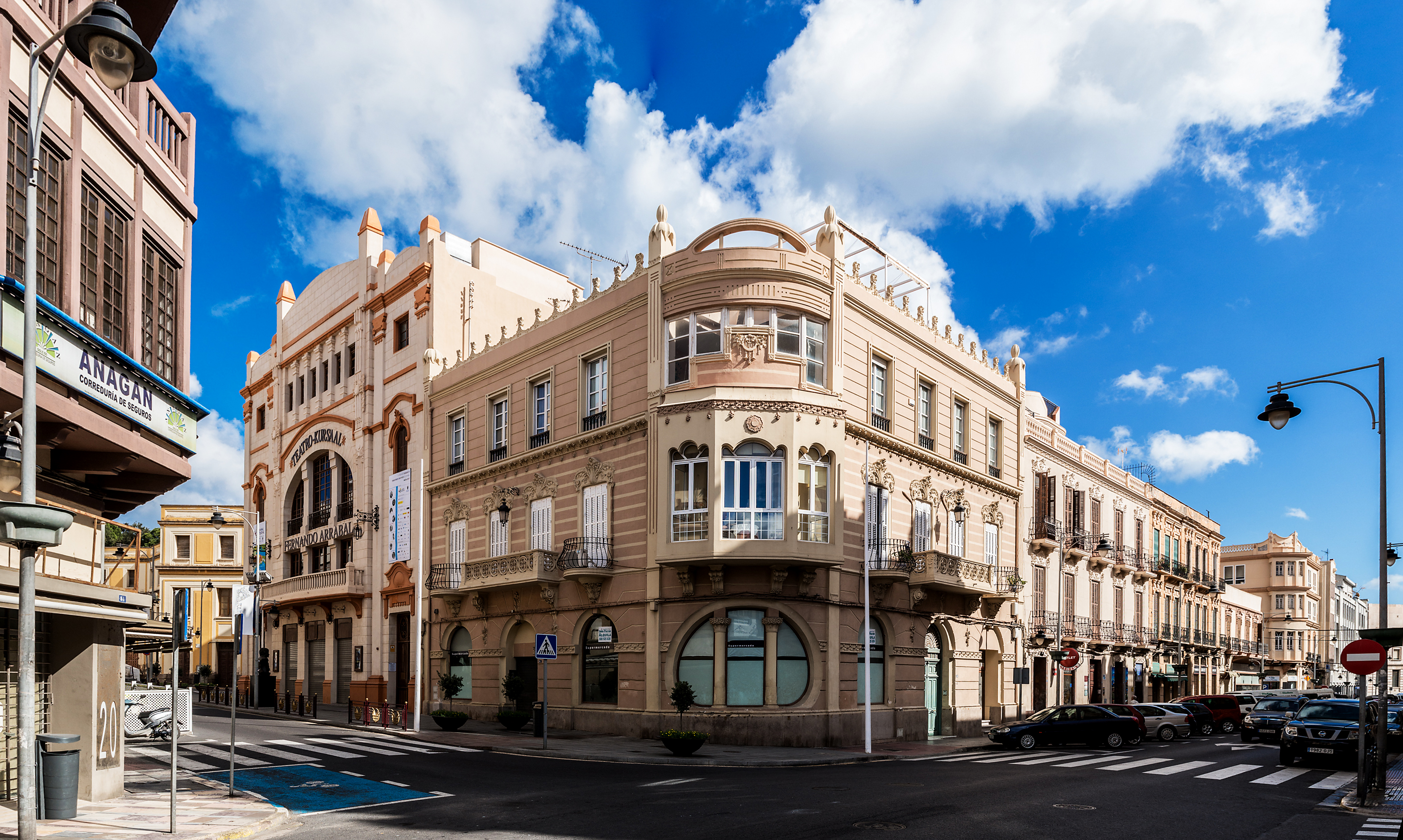
Former editorial office of El Telegrama del Rif

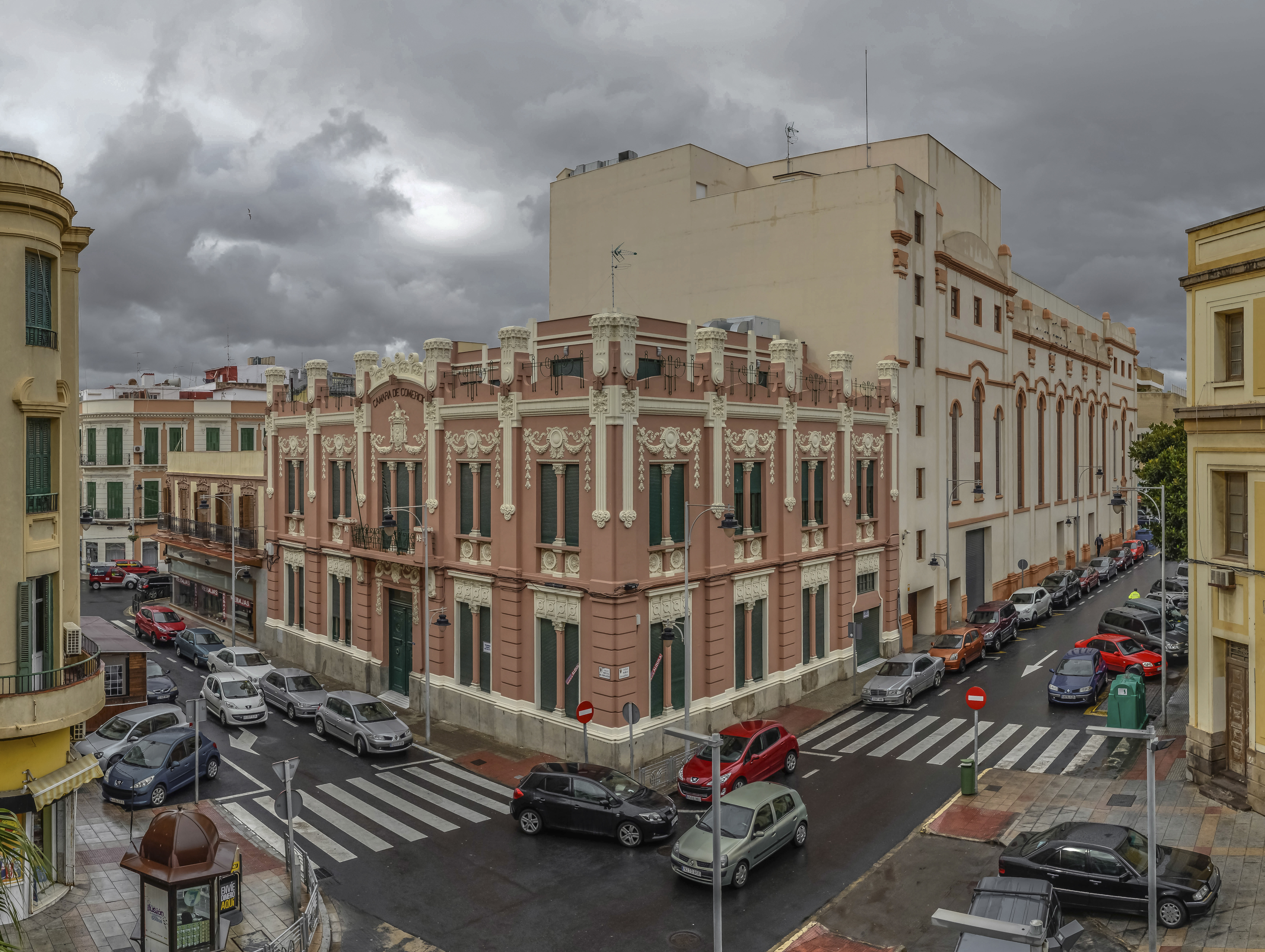
Official Chamber of Commerce, Industry and Navigation

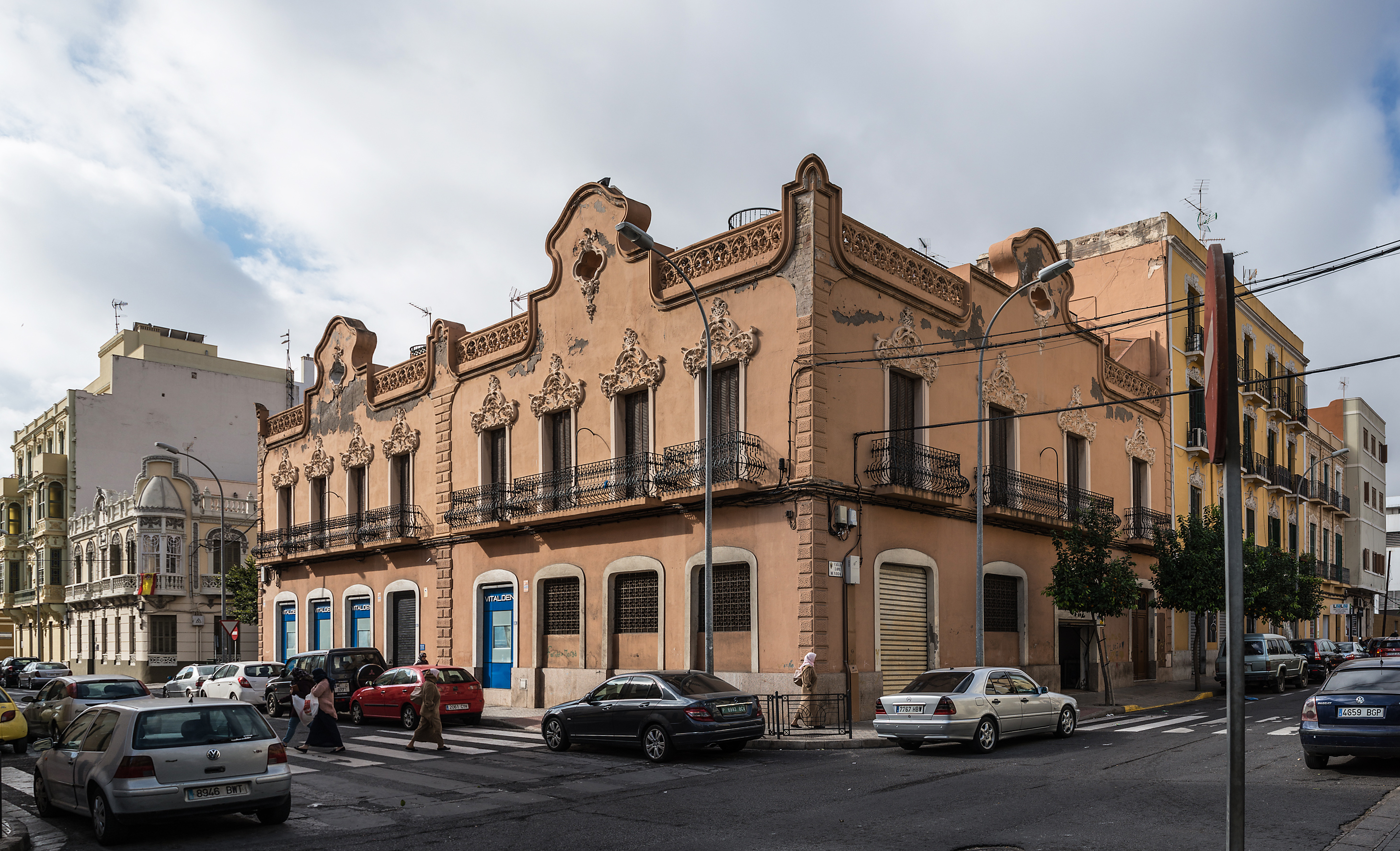
Furniture La Reconquista

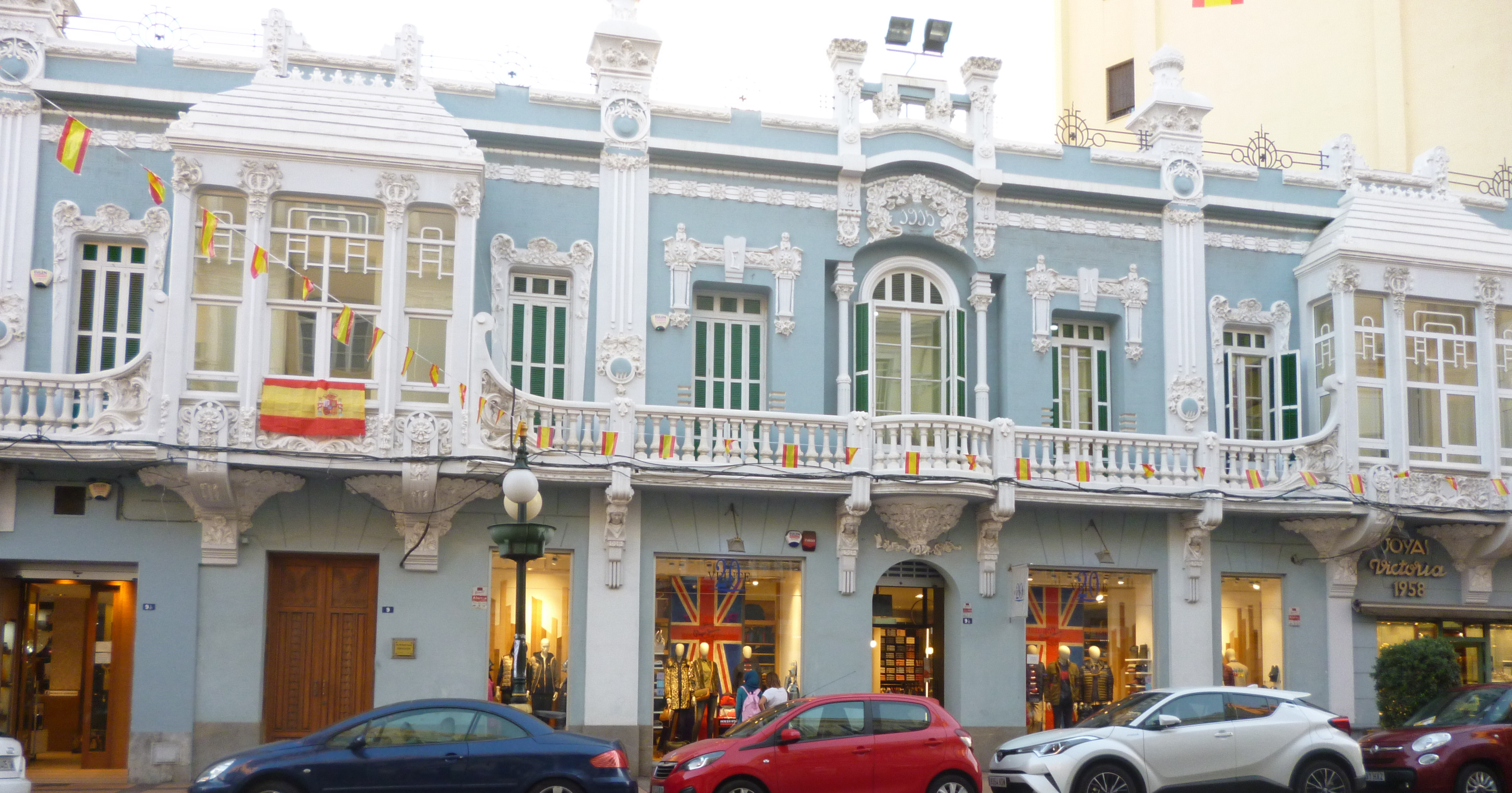
Former Military Commissary

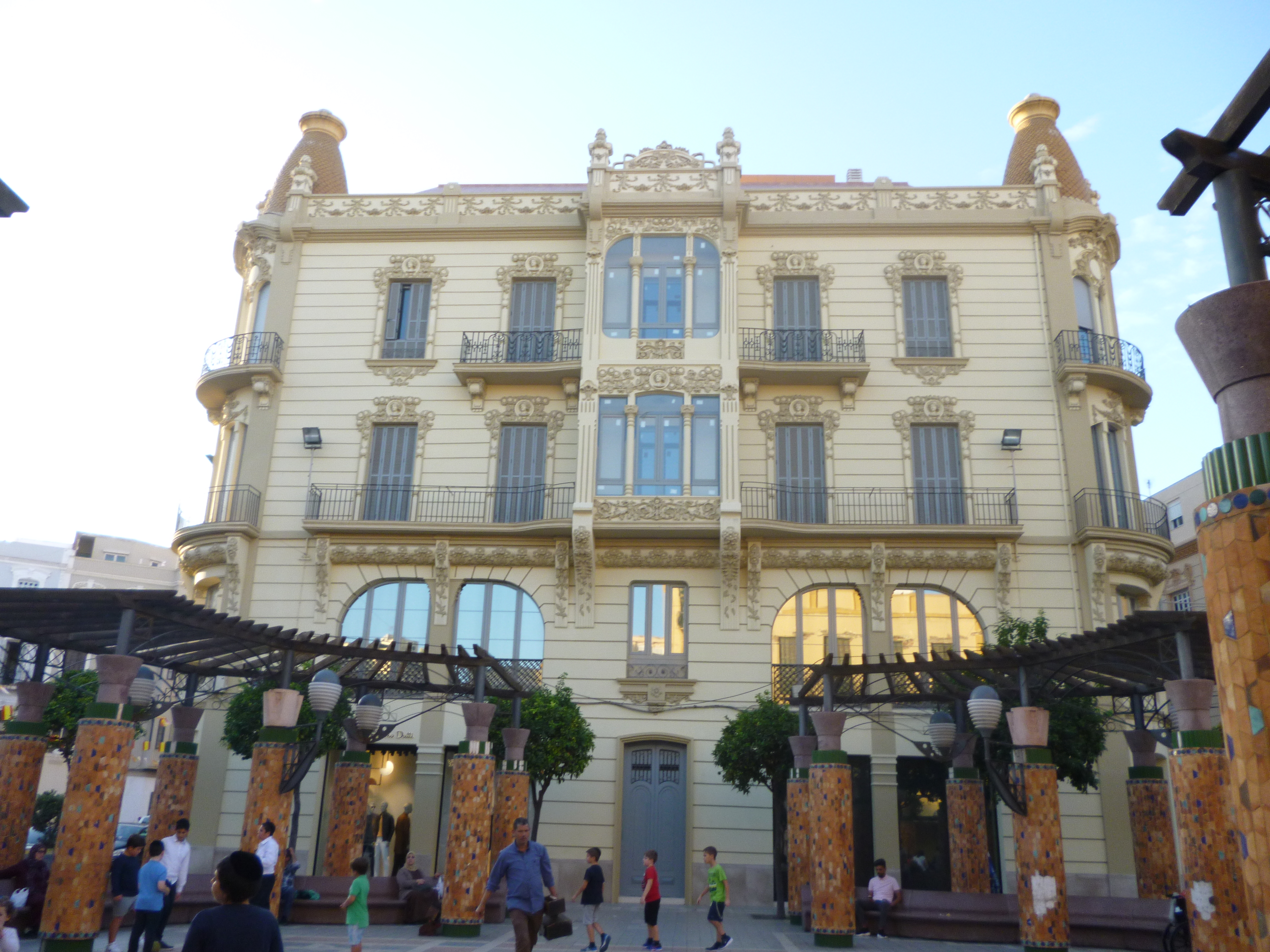
Former Reconquista Department Store

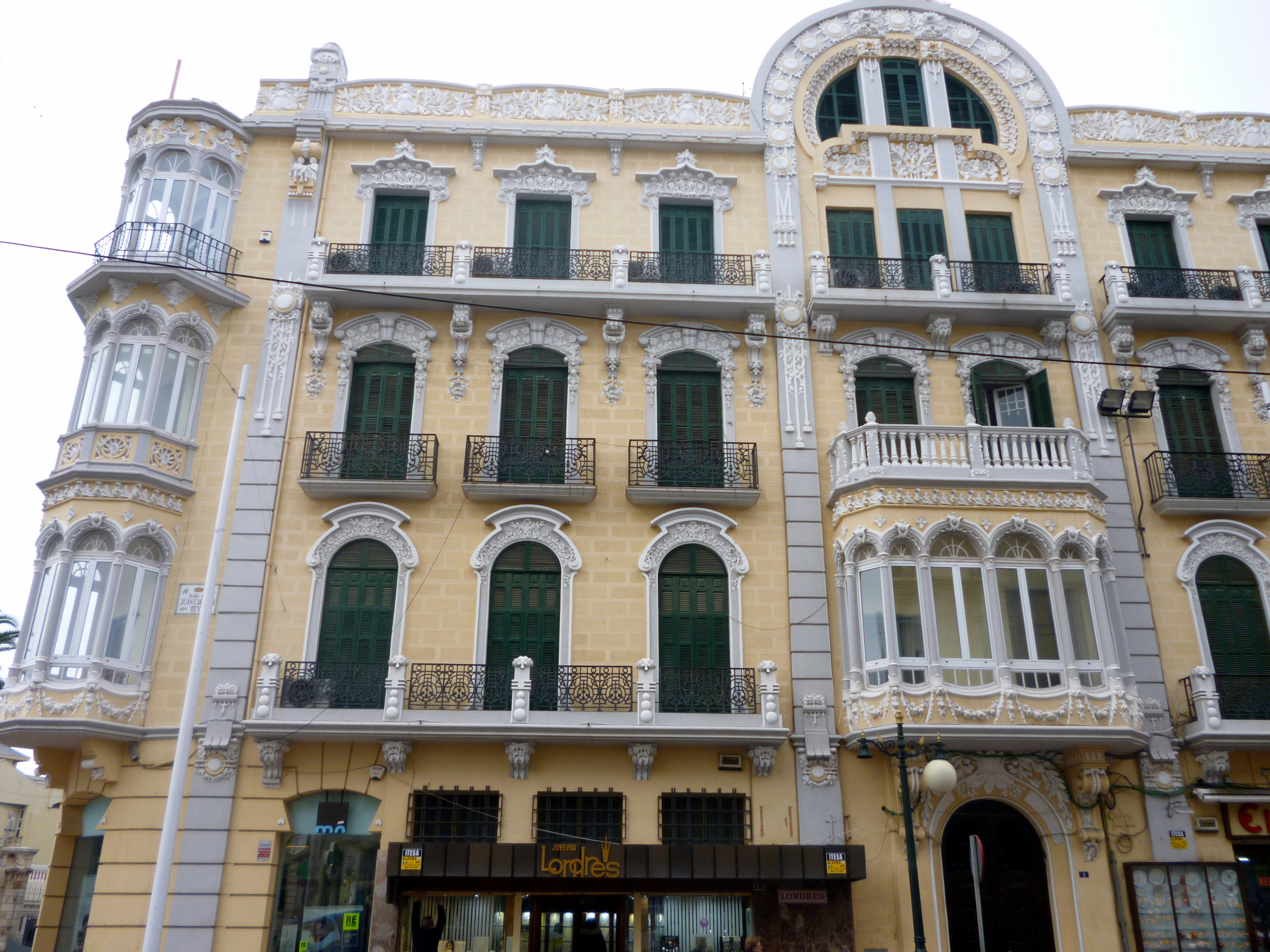
David J. Melul House

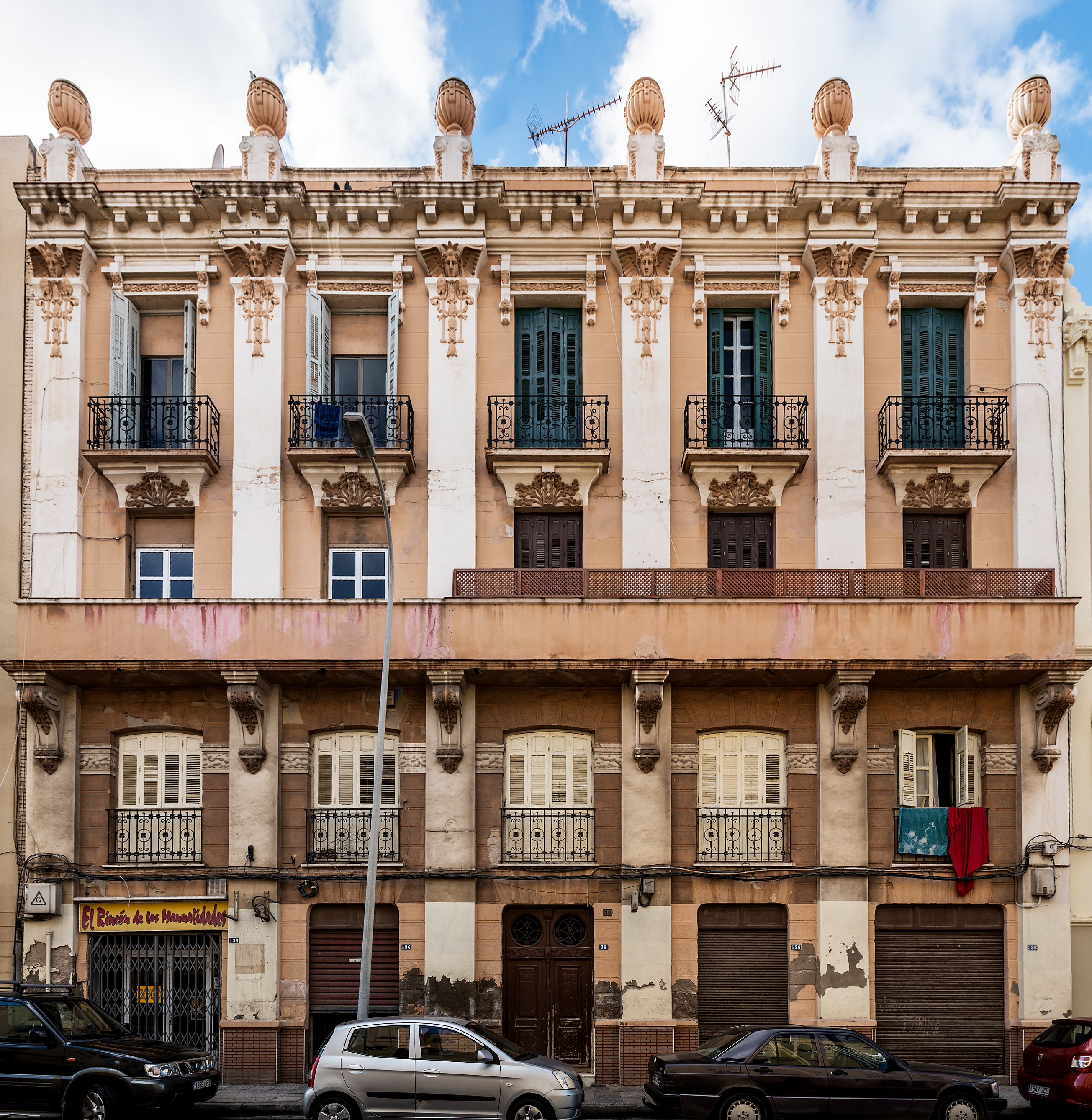
House of Jose Zea and Manuel Alvadalejo

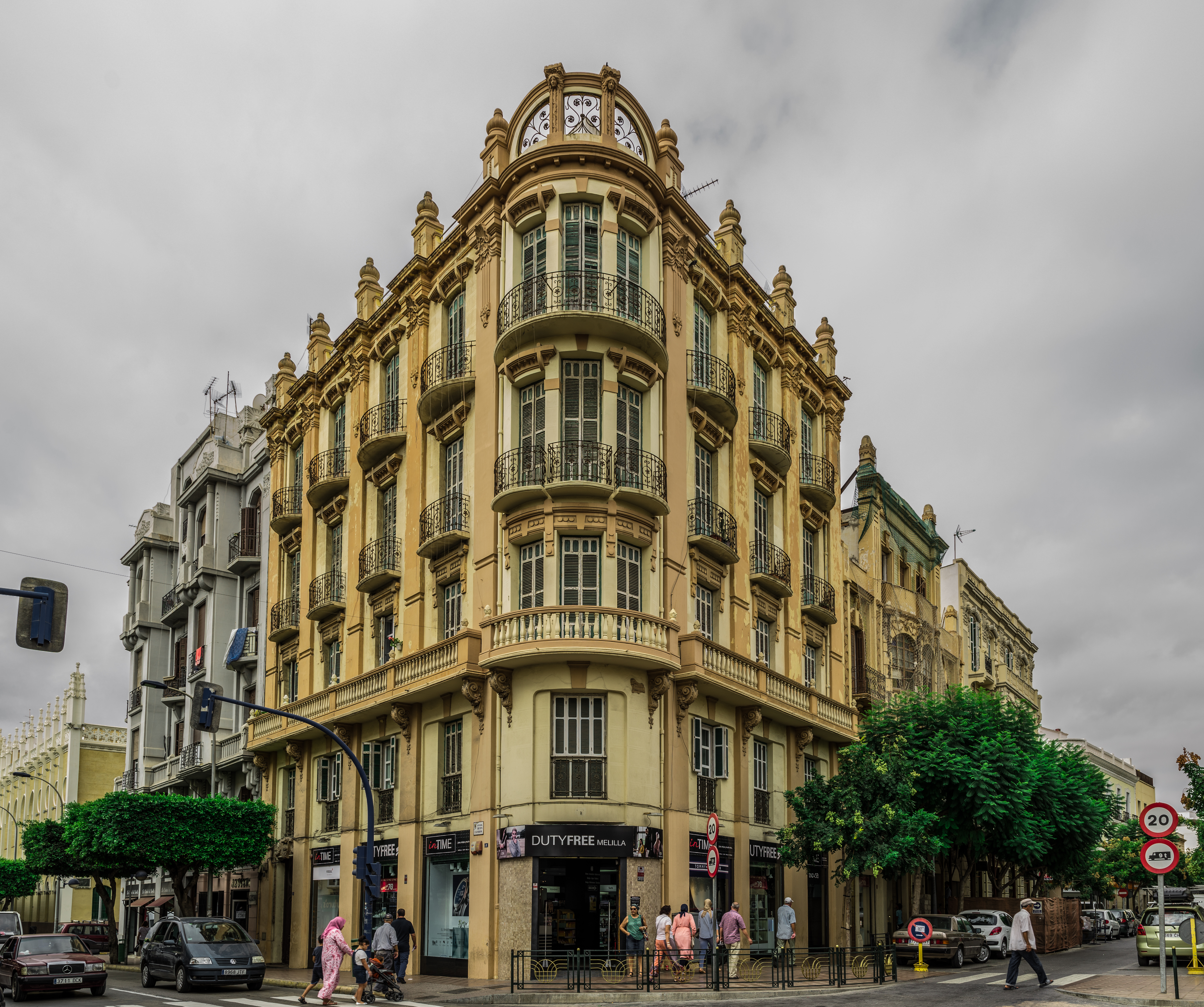
House of Jose Garcia Alvaro

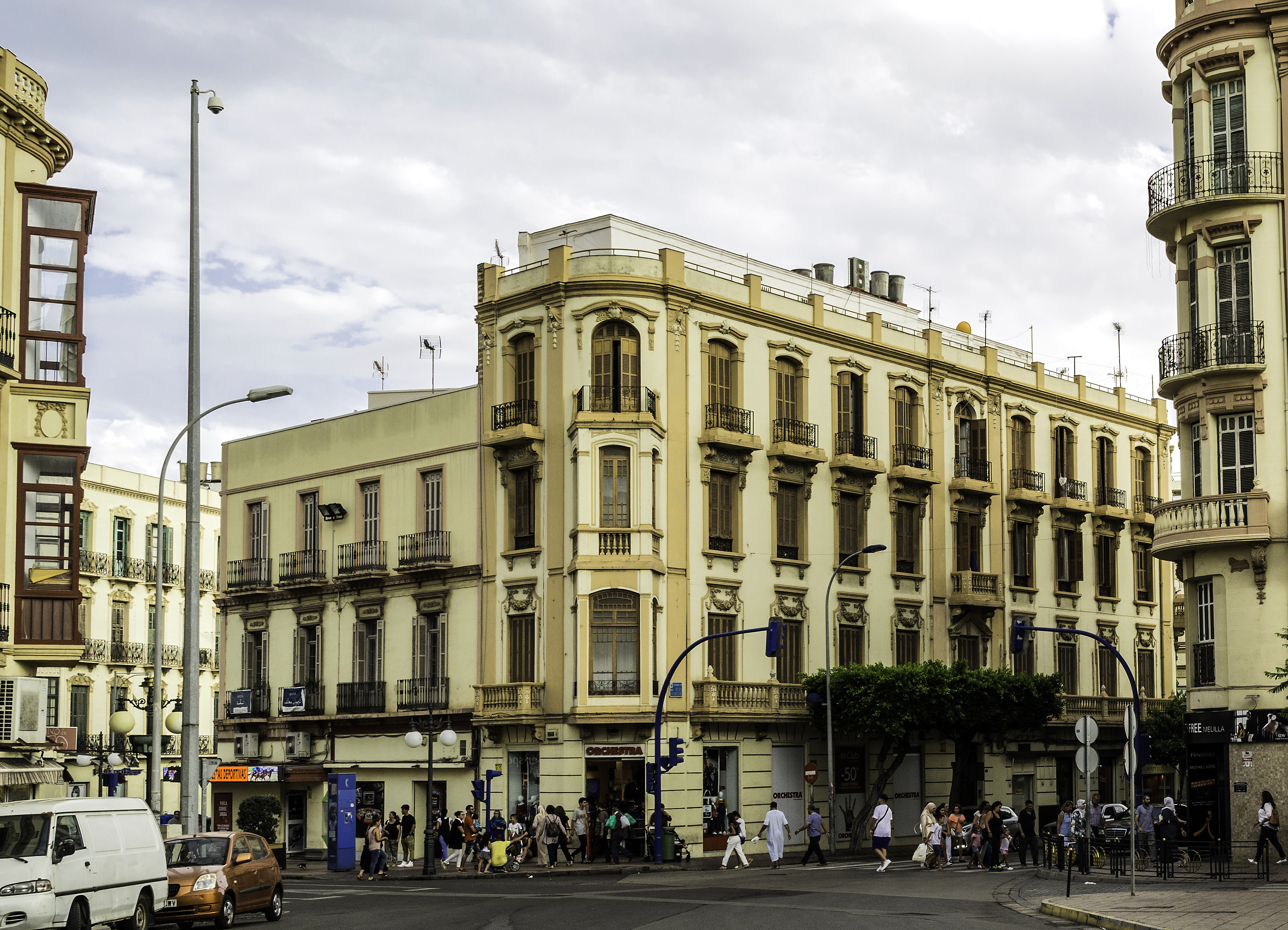
House of Juan Montes Hoyo

Emilio Alzugaray

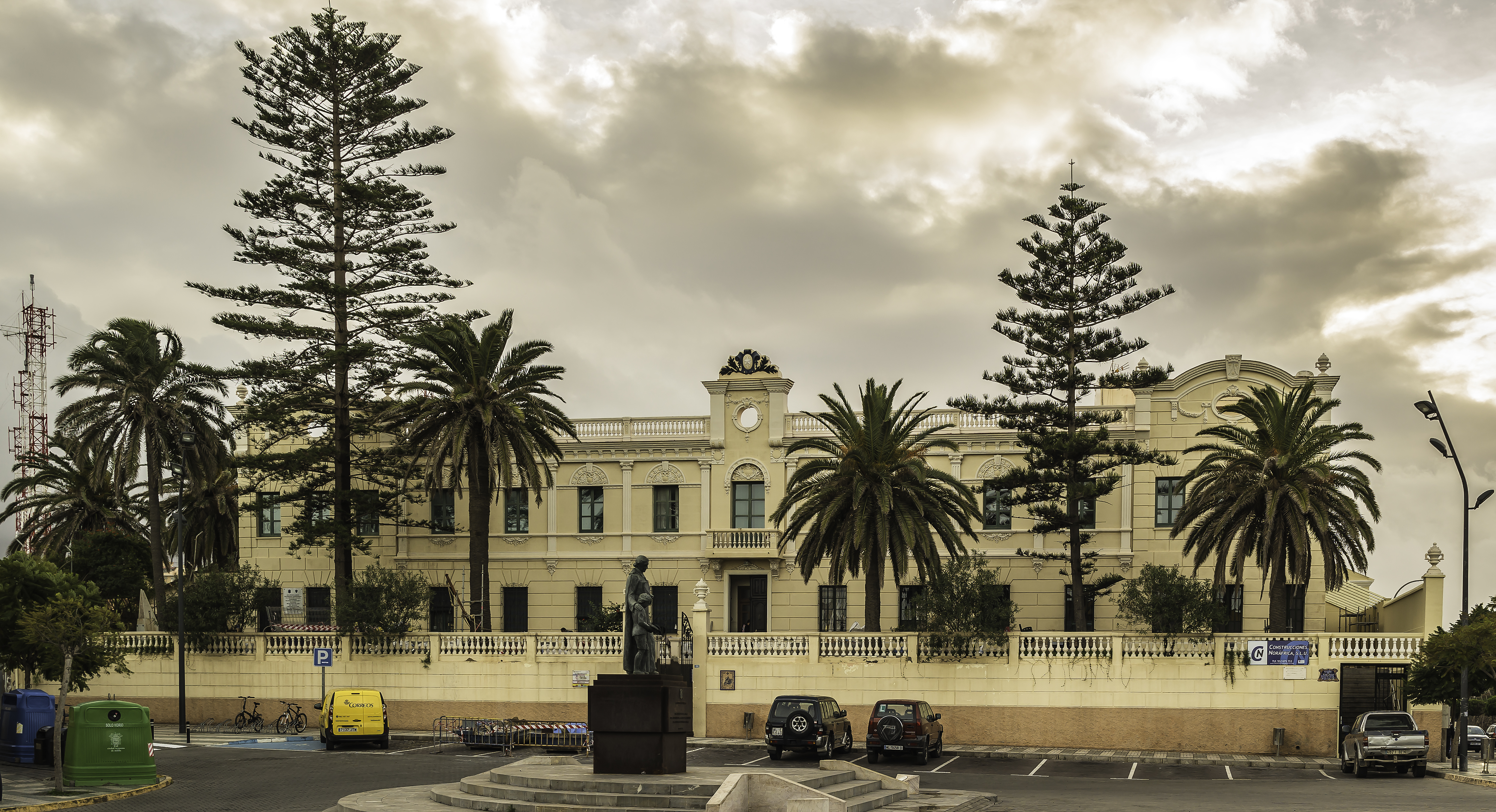
College of the Brothers of the Christian Schools

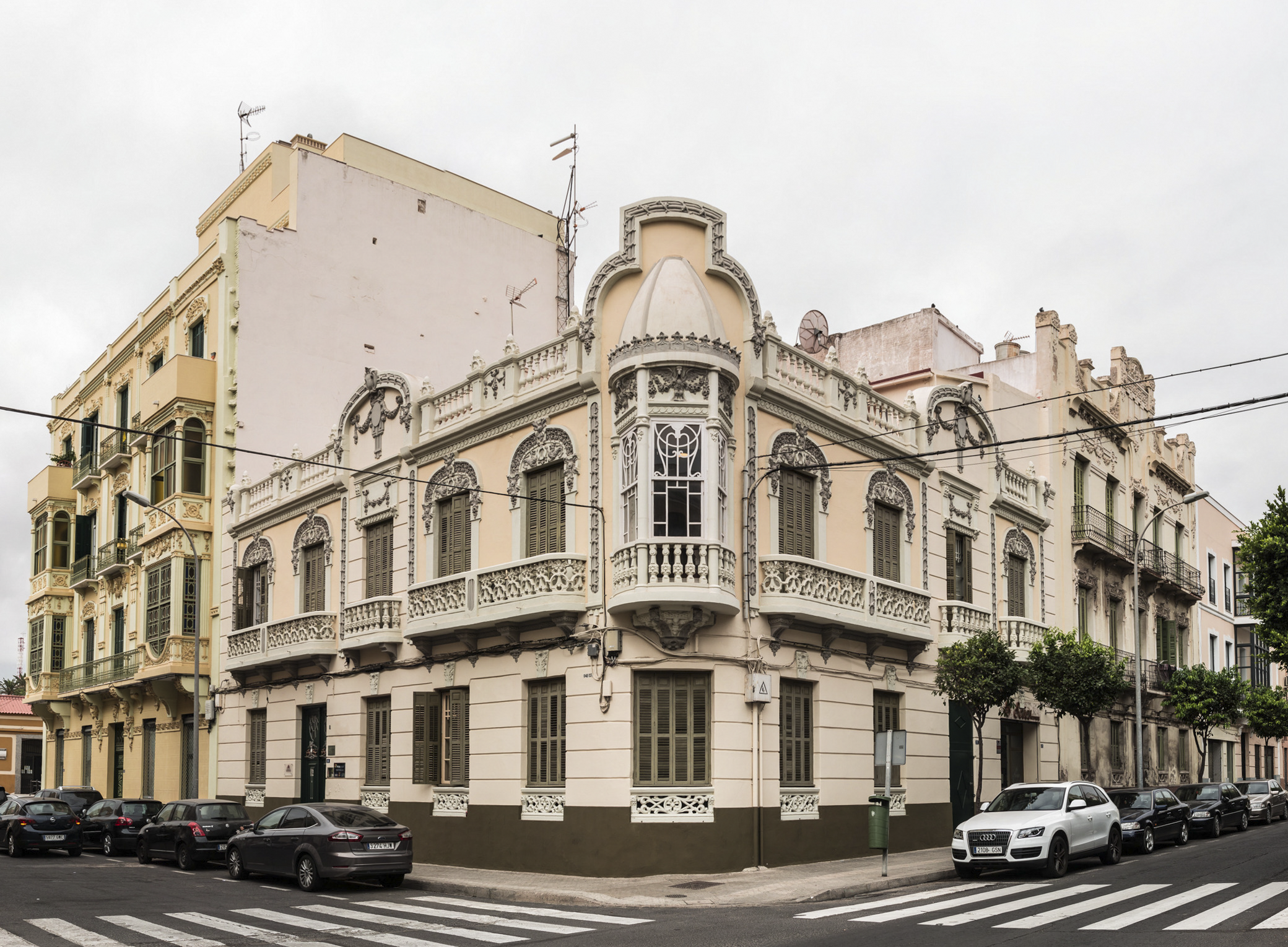
House of Solomon Cohen

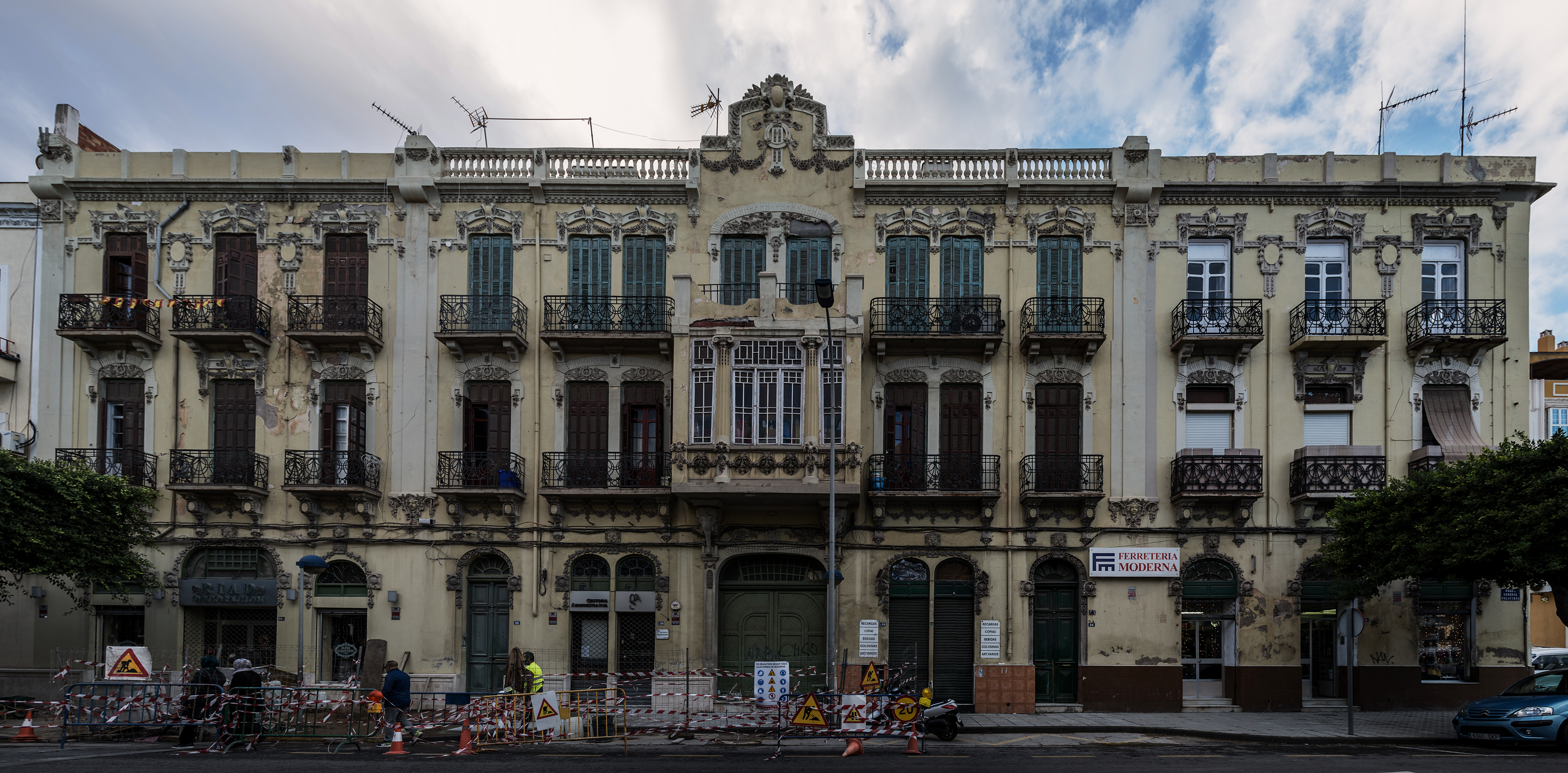
Casa de las Fieras (Melilla) (House of Beasts)

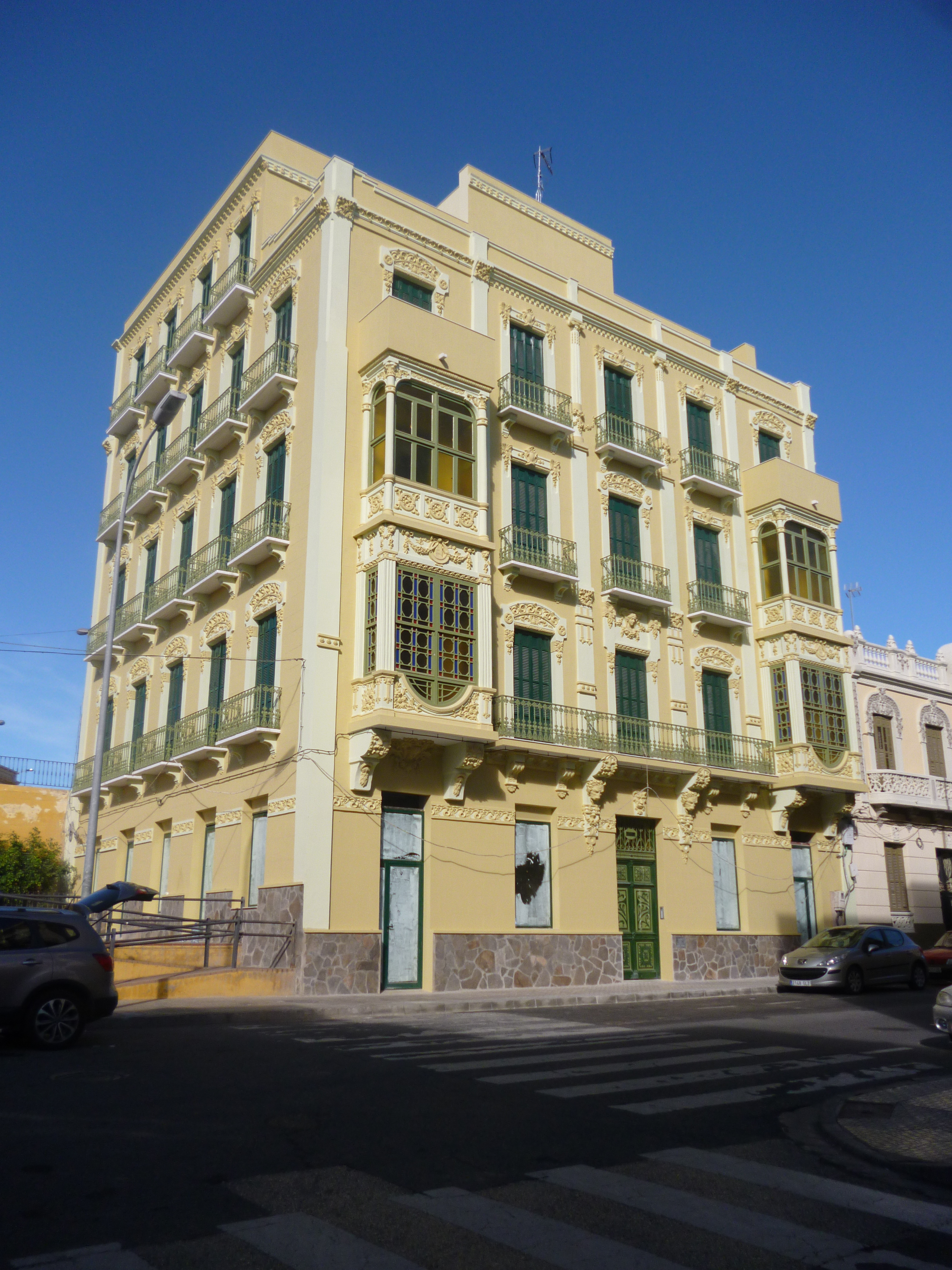
House of Jose Morely

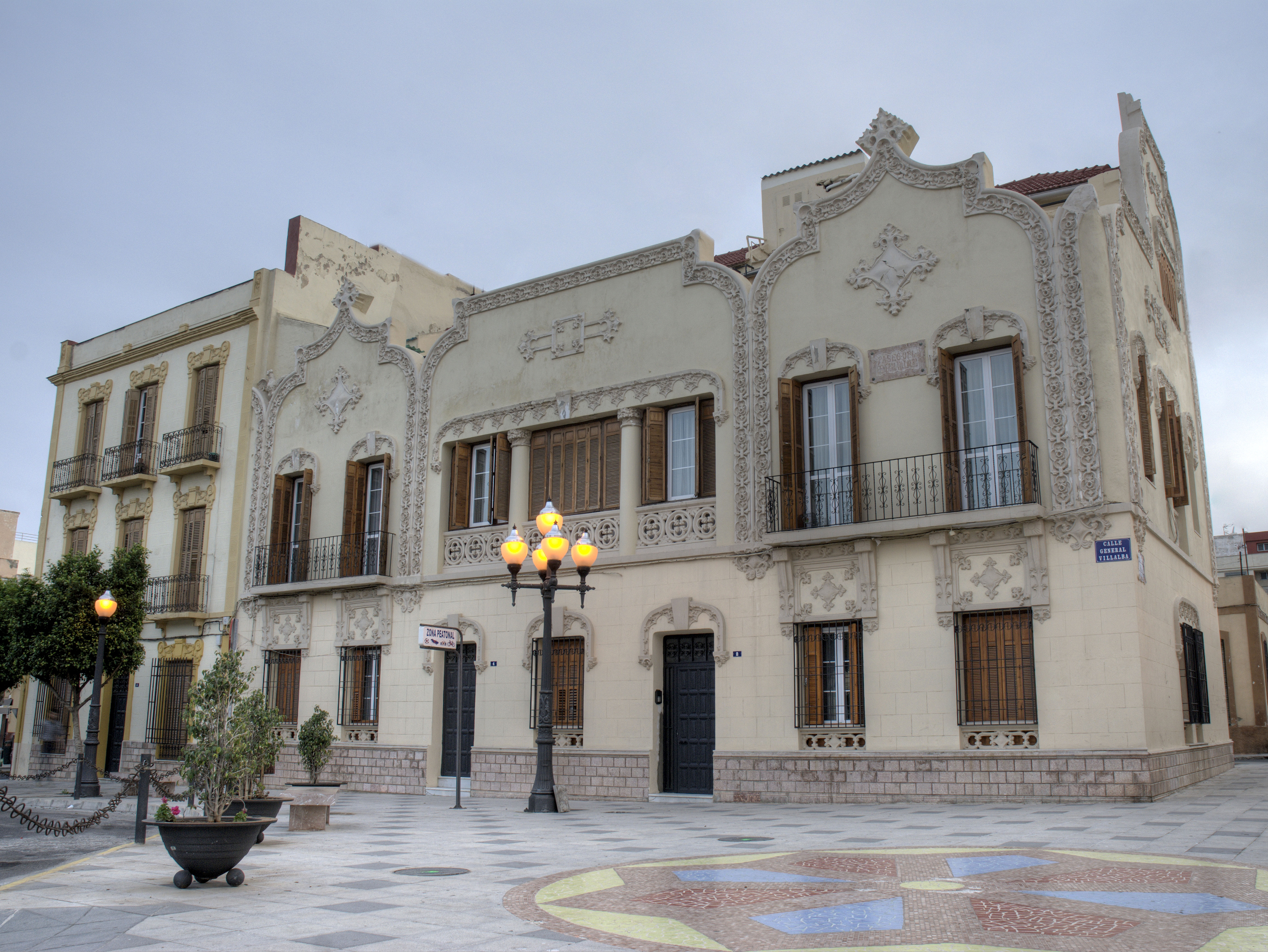
Samuel Salama's Widow's House

== Art Deco ==
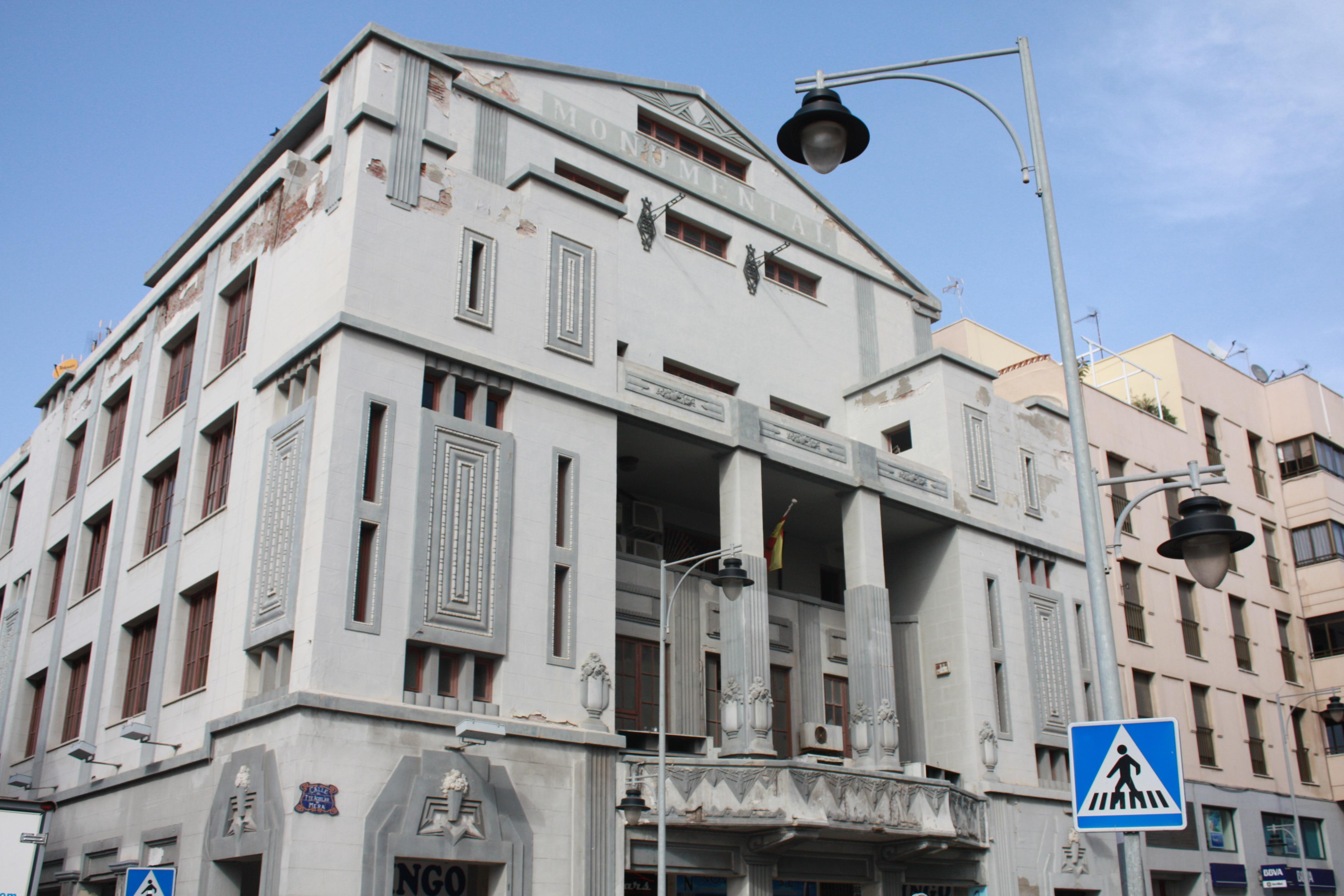
Monumental Cinema Sport

The Art Deco Monumental Cinema Sport, constructed between 1930 and 1932, is the masterpiece of architect Lorenzo Ros y Costa.

=== Enrique Nieto ===
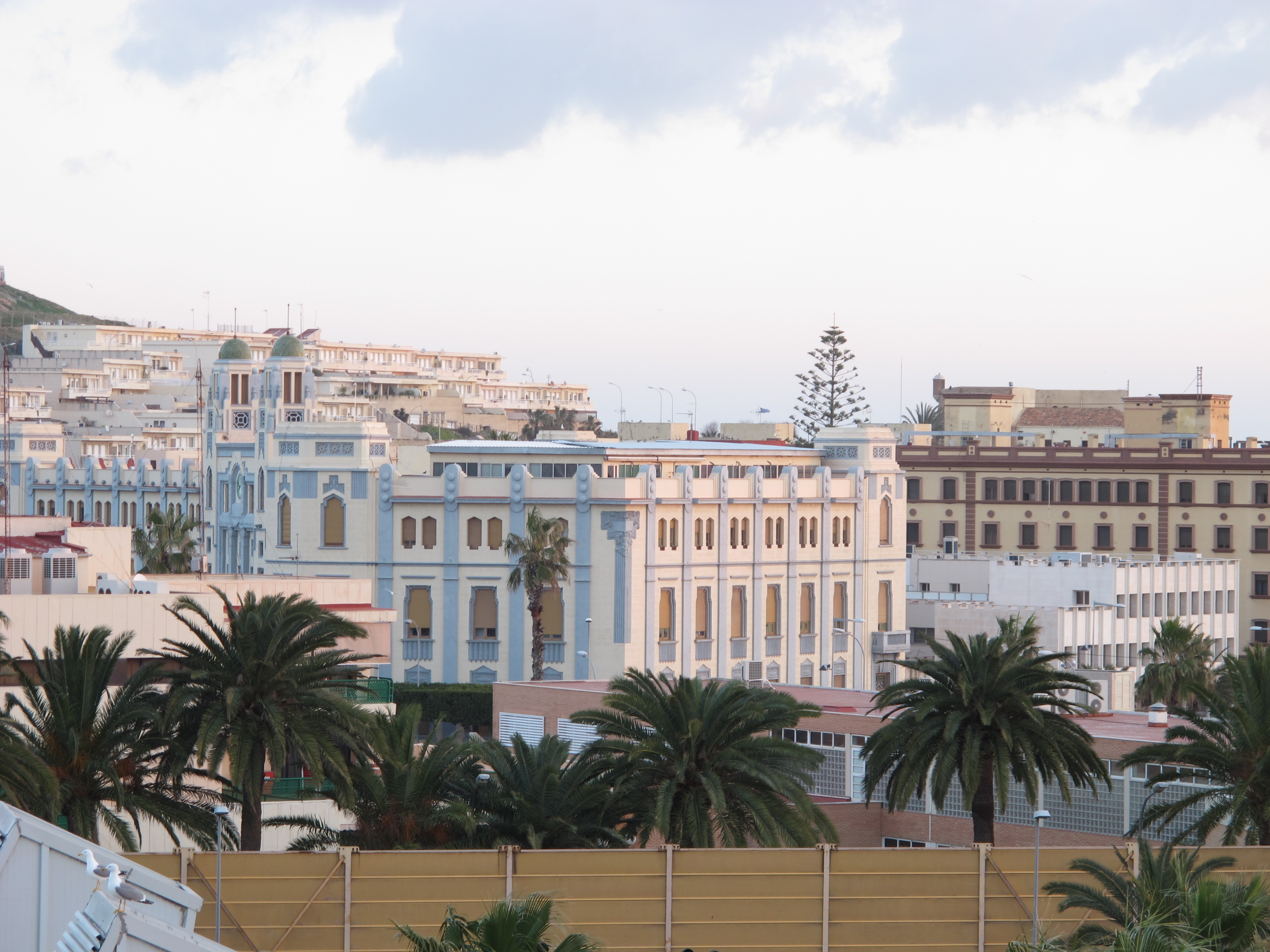
Palace of the Assembly

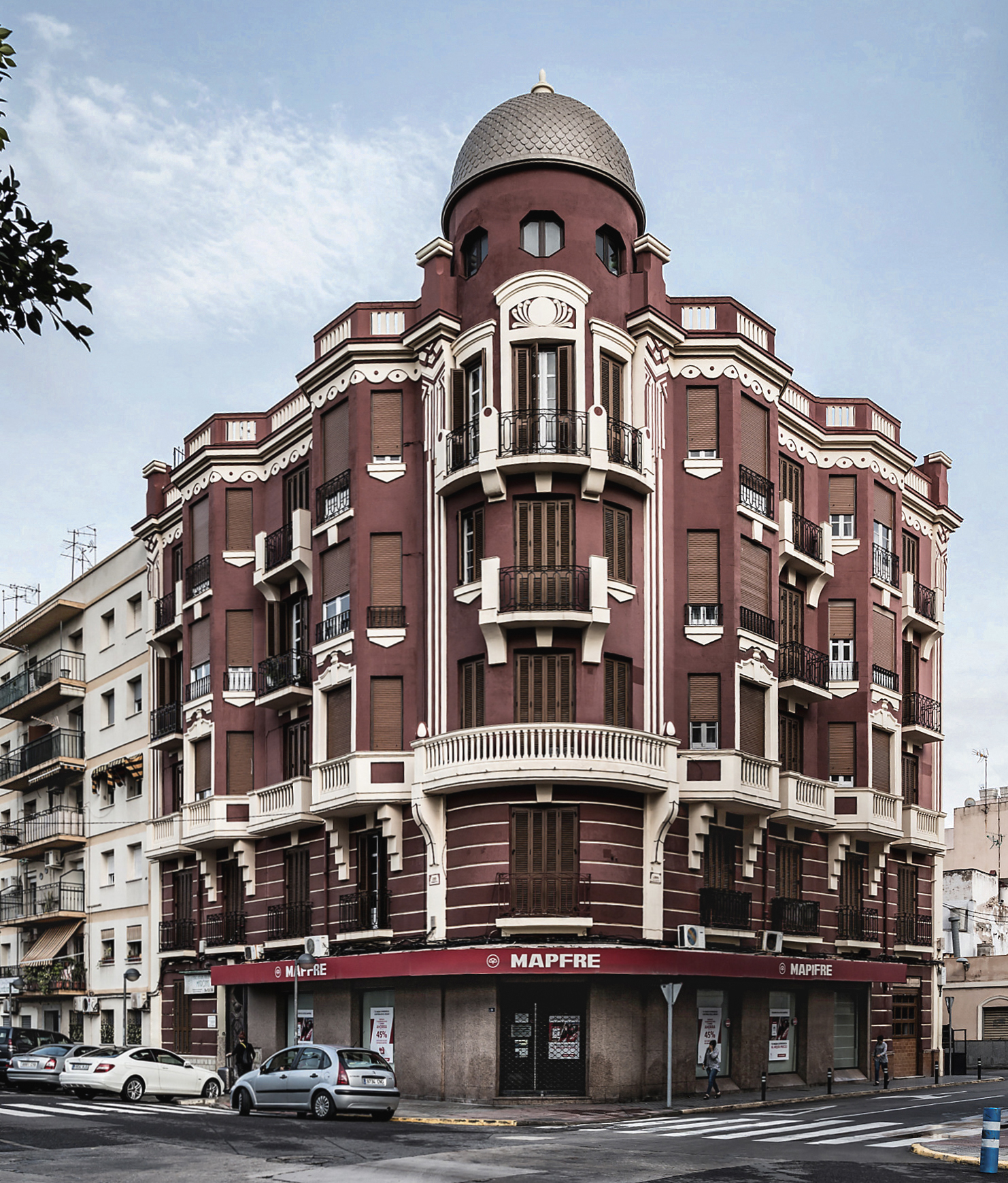
Red Building

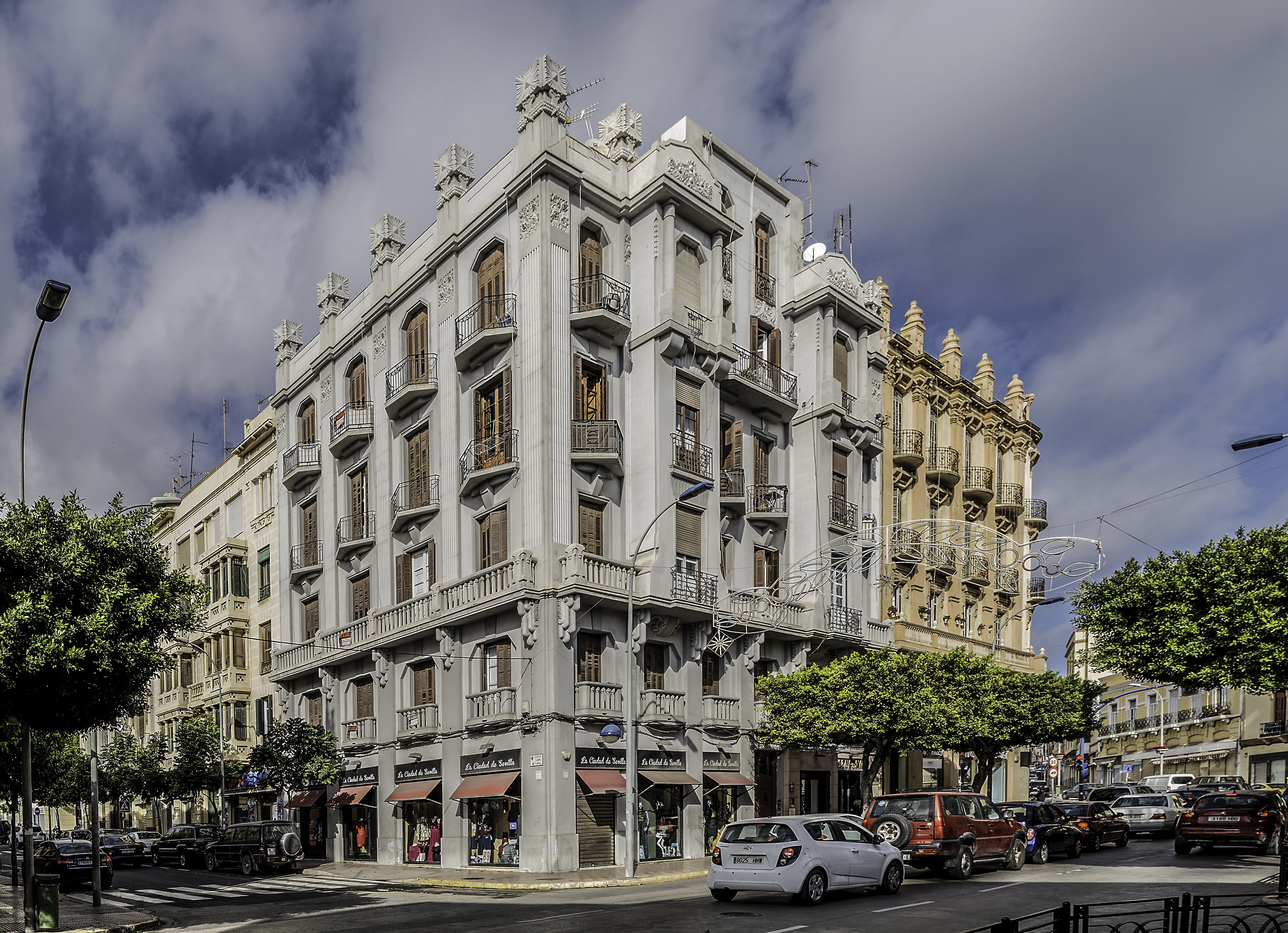
Enrique Nieto's House

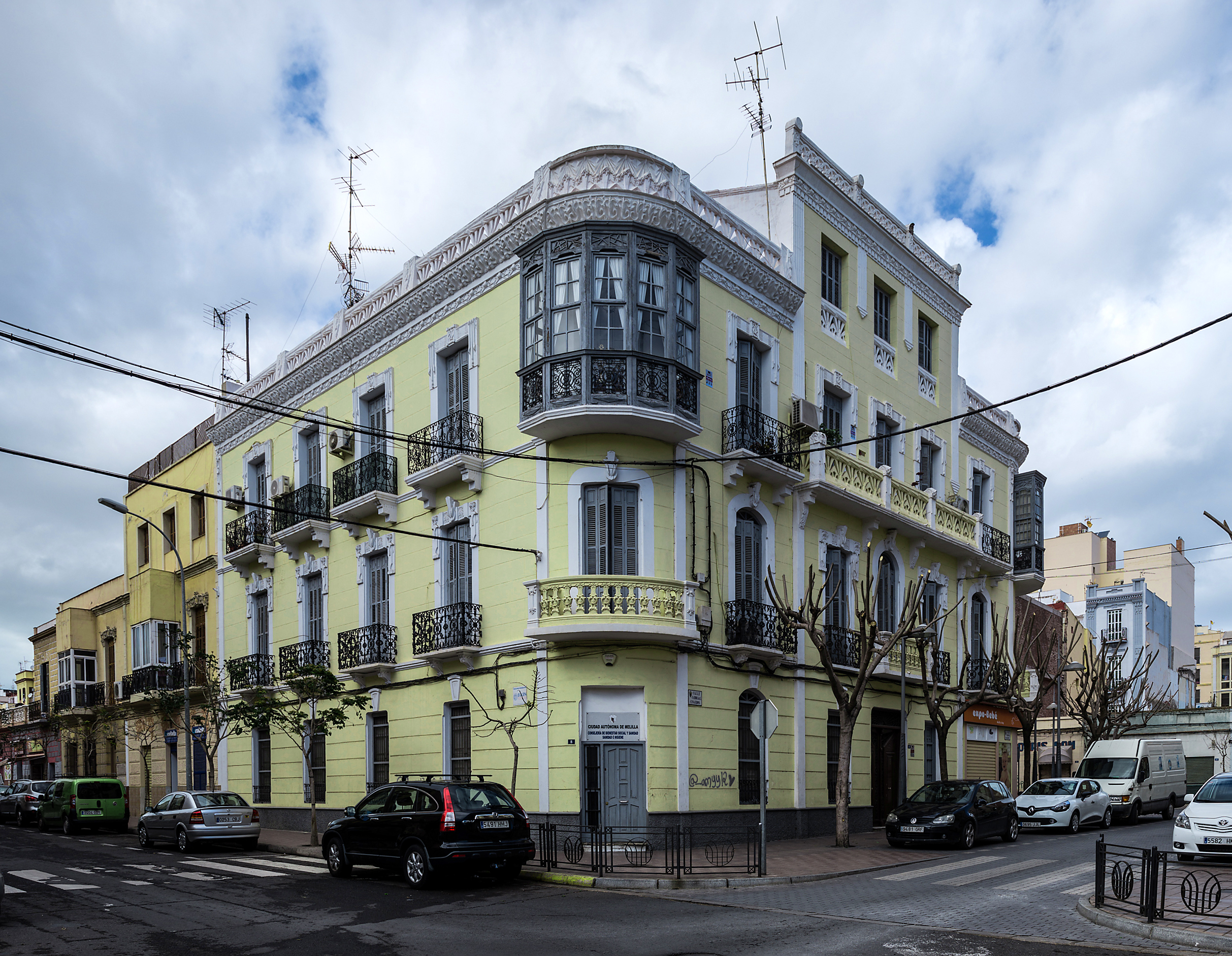
Carcaño's House

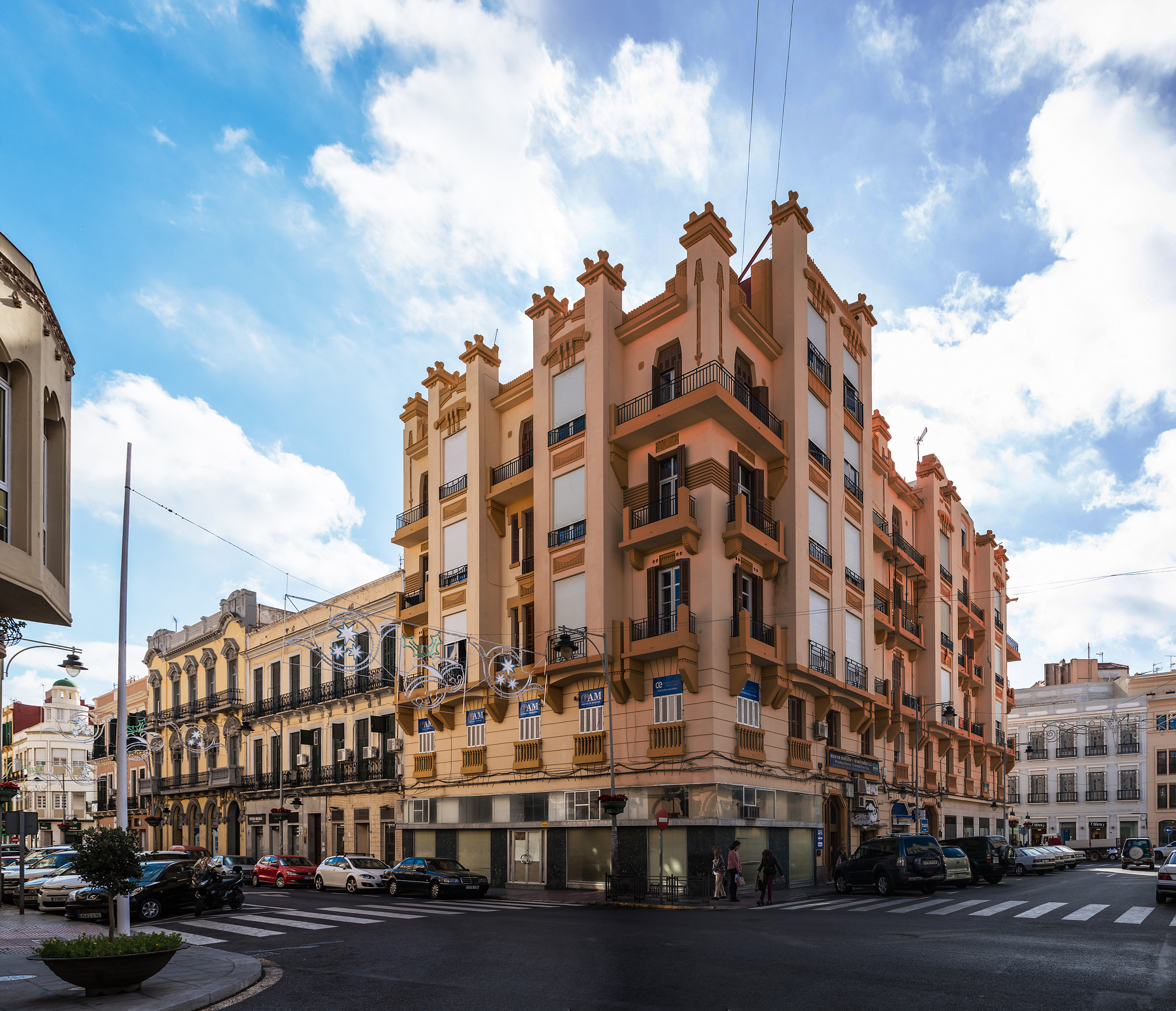
Rafael Rico Albert's House

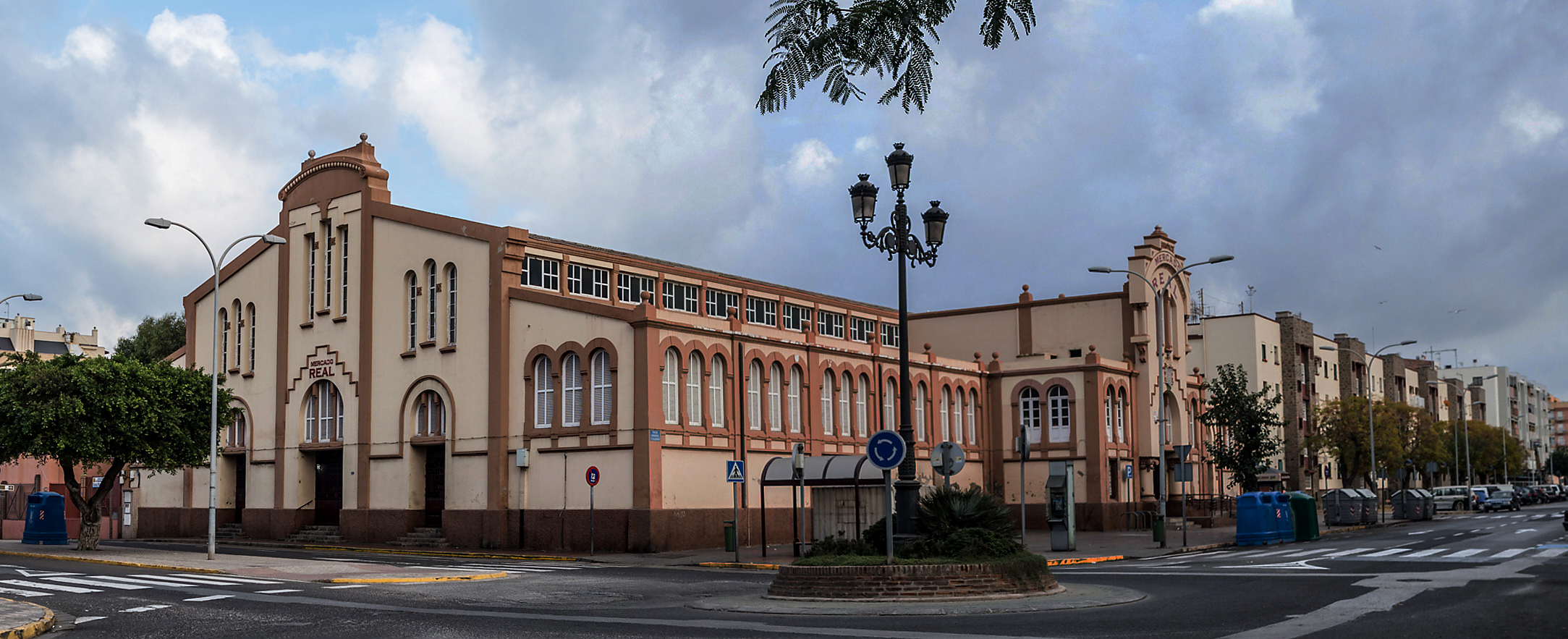
Real Market

=== Francisco Hernanz ===
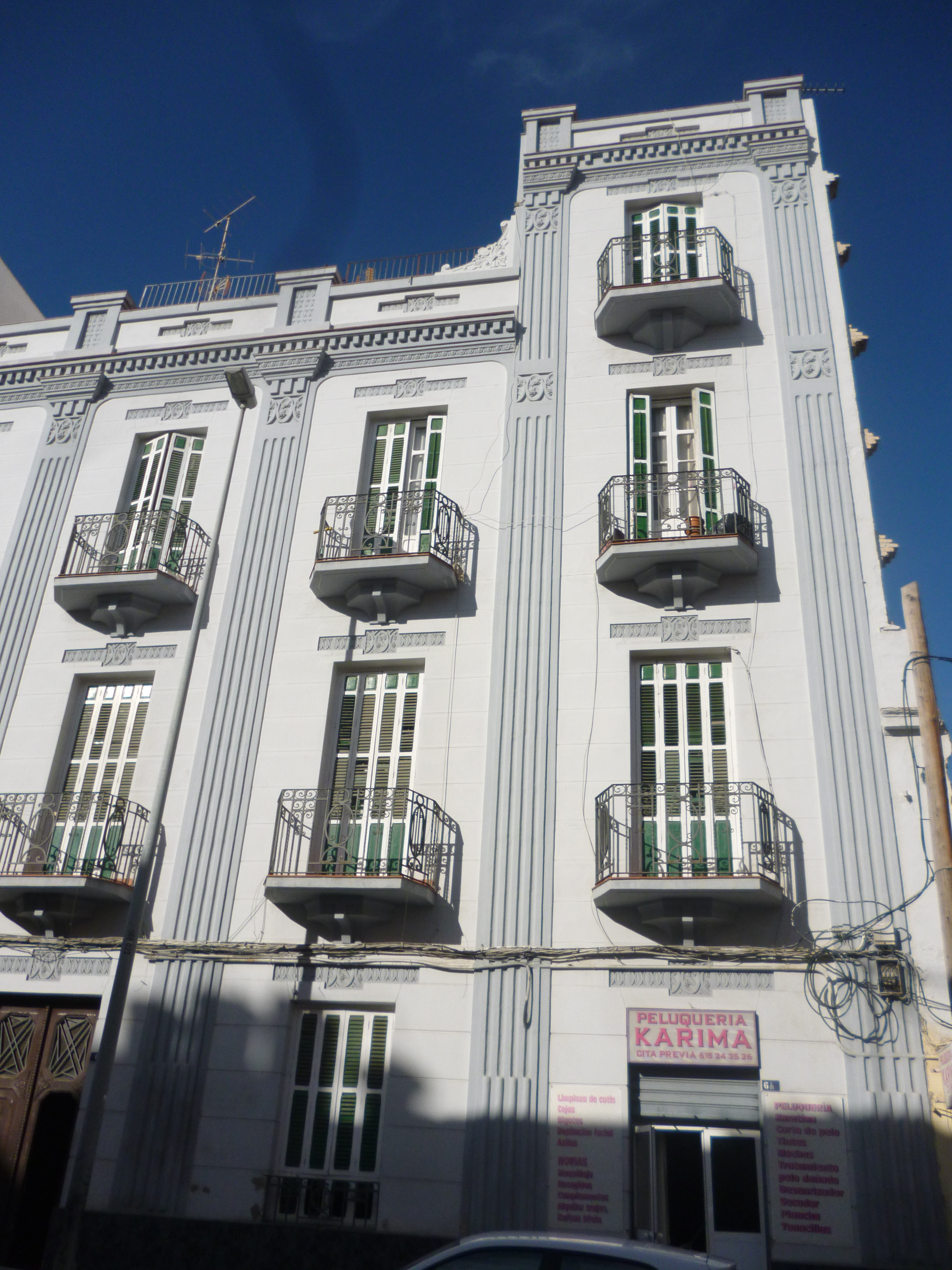
House of Jacinto García Marfil

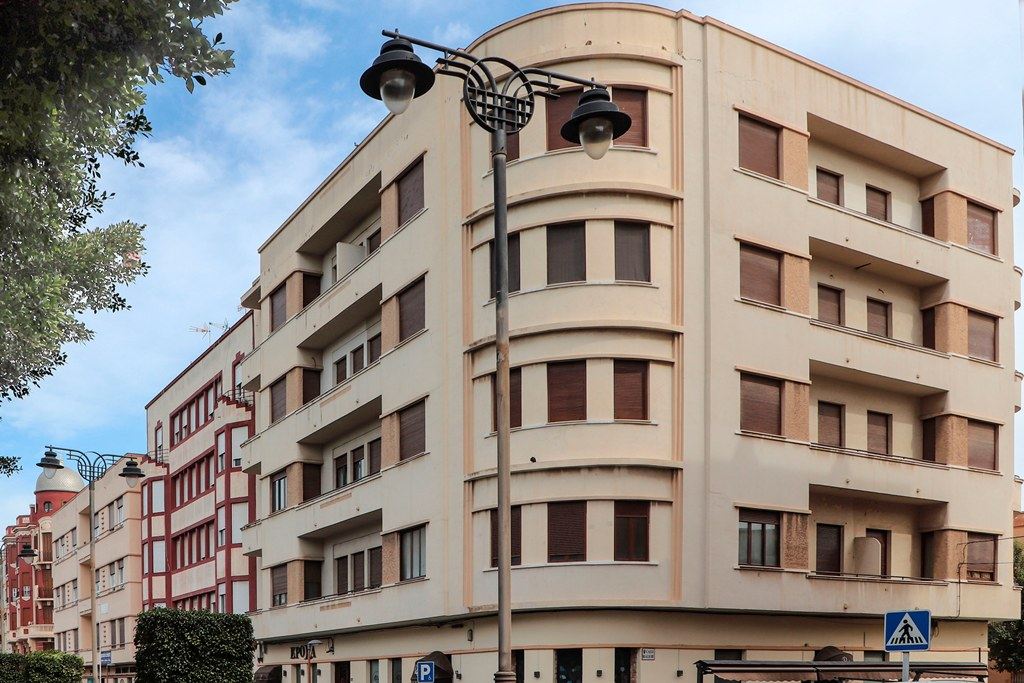
House of Luis Raya

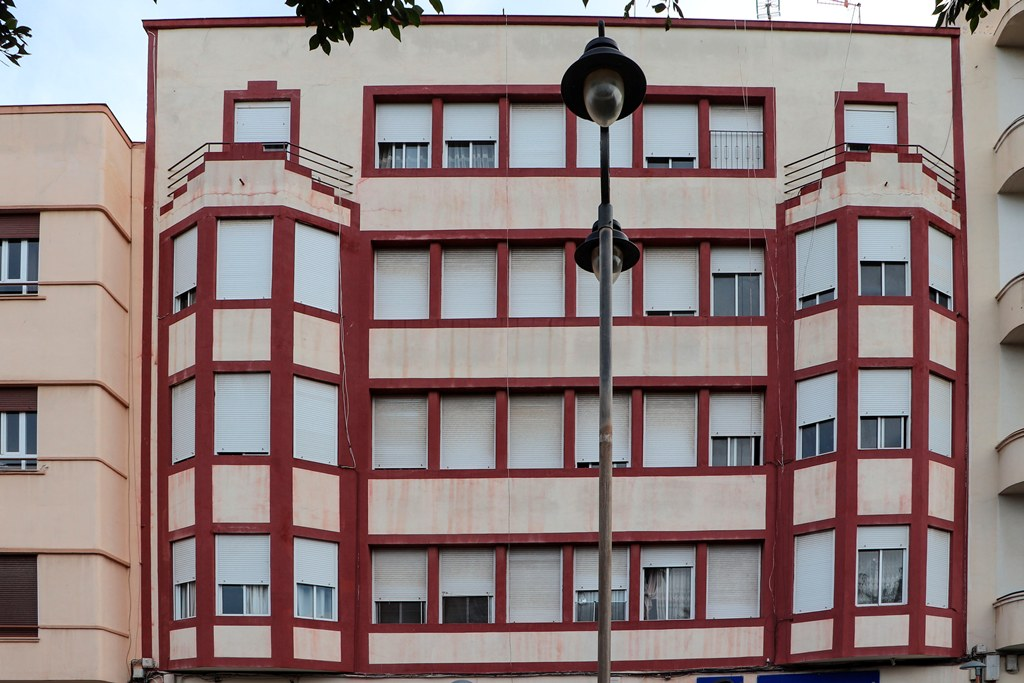
House of Abraham Benatar

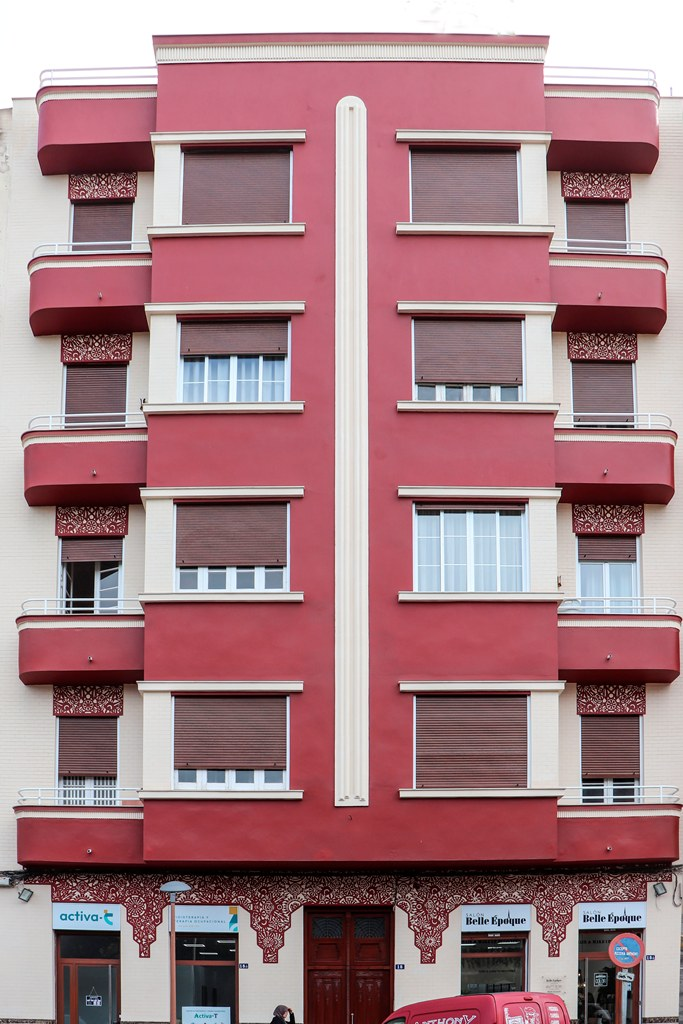
House of Bertila Seoane

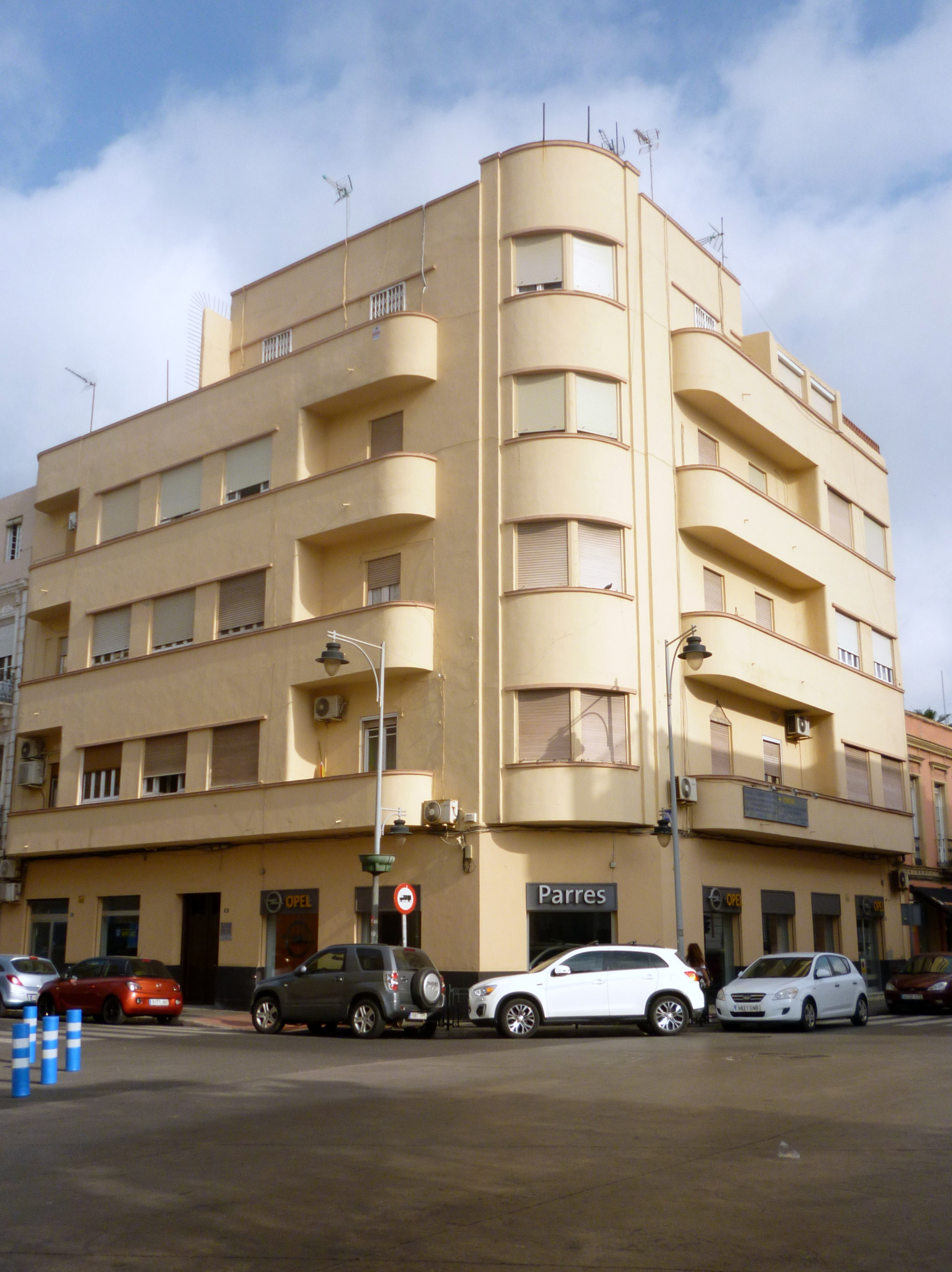
House of Juan Parres Puig

Francisco Hernanz built in an aerodynamic art deco style, with sober lines and almost no decoration.

== Rationalism ==
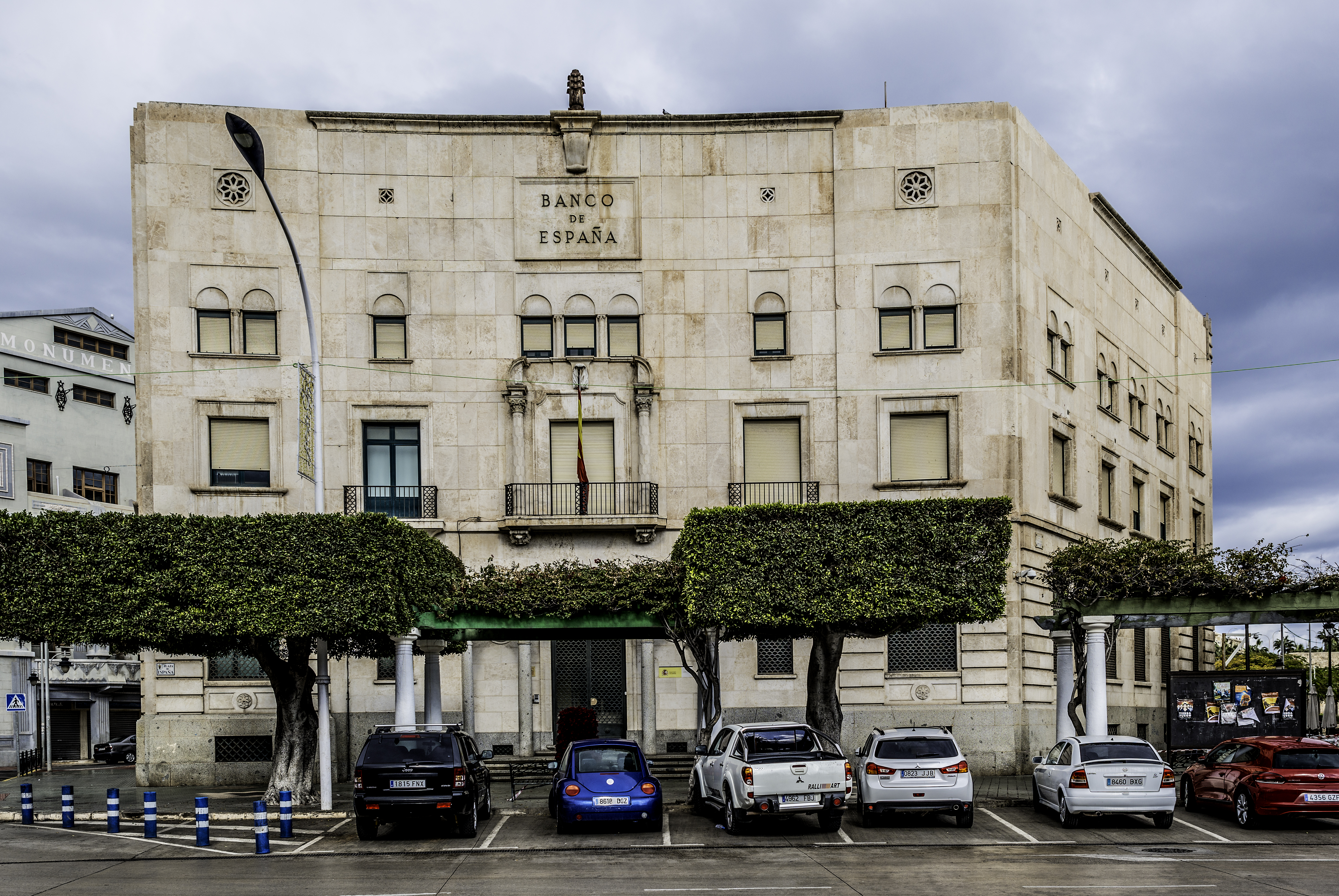
Bank of Spain building

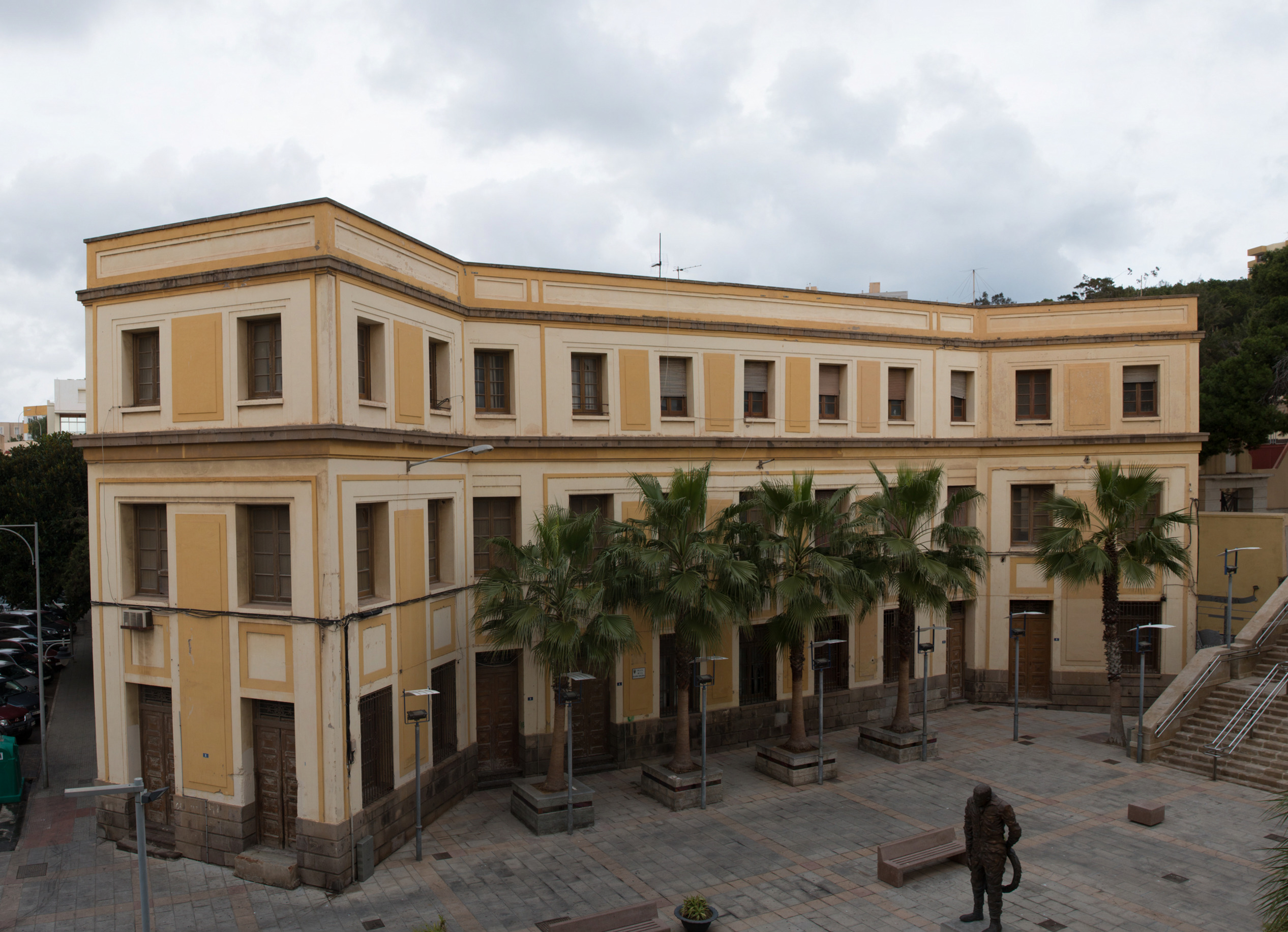
Post Office Building in Melilla

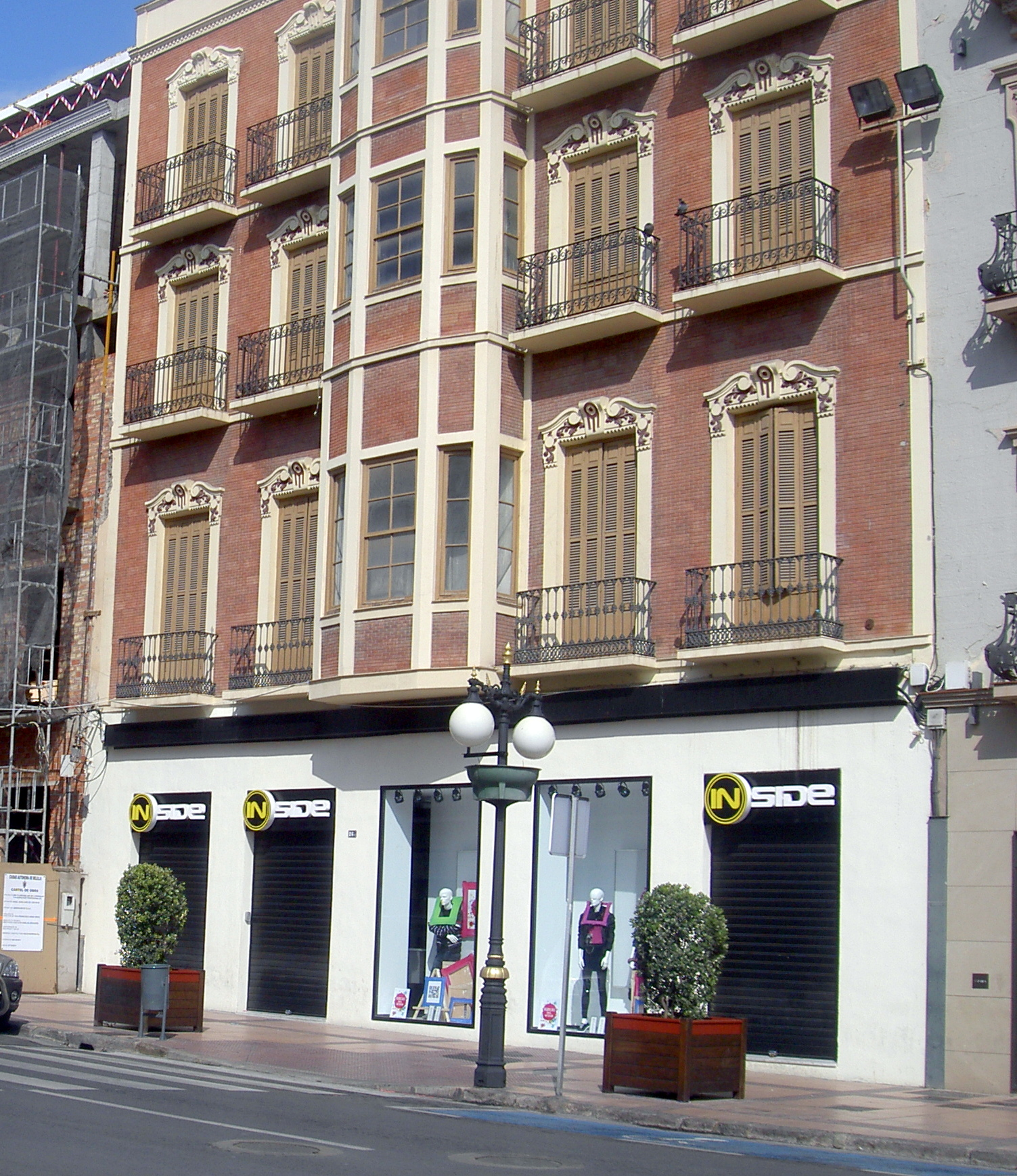
Amram J. Wahnon House

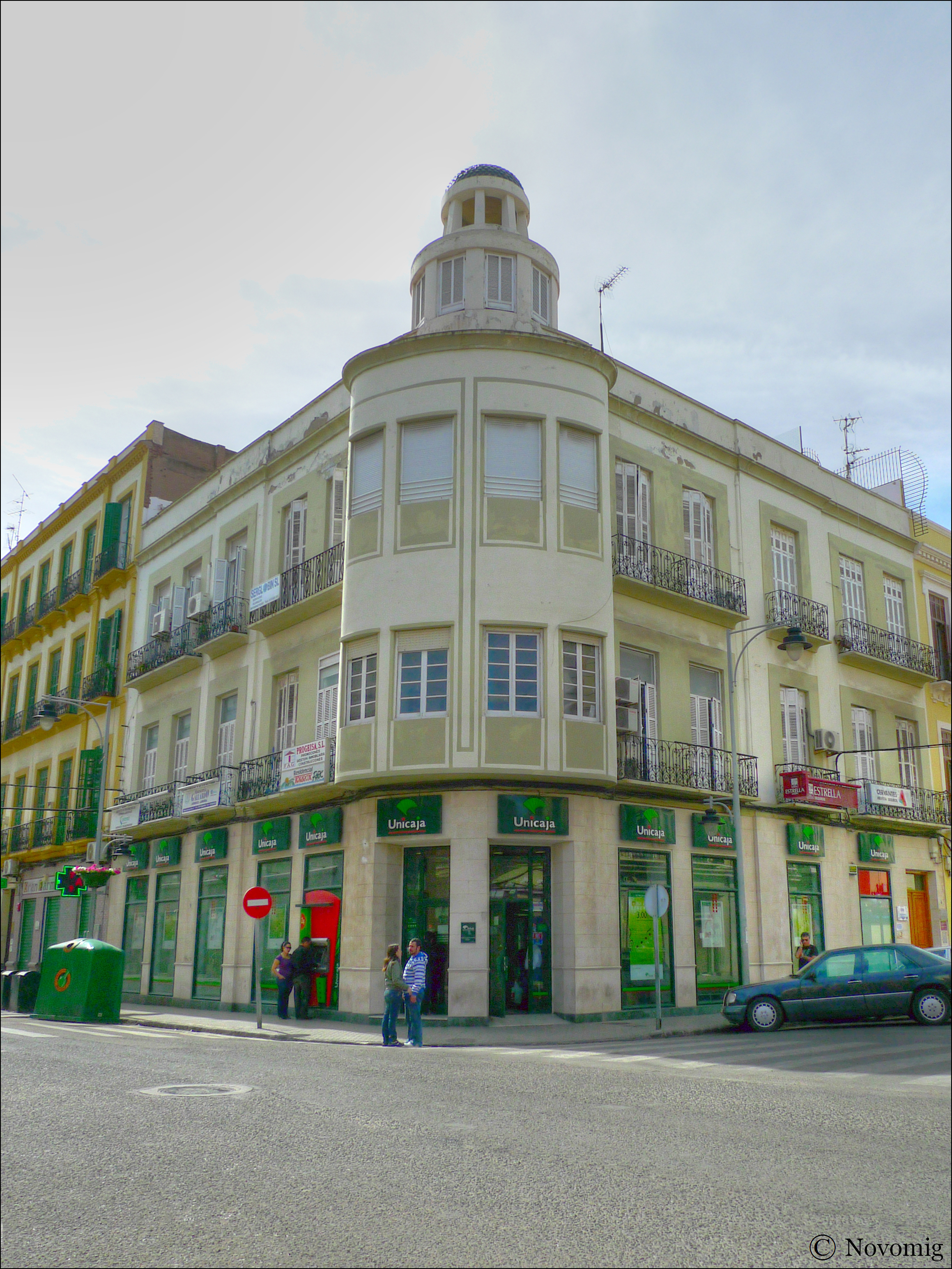
Cervantes Street, 4

== Industrial architecture ==
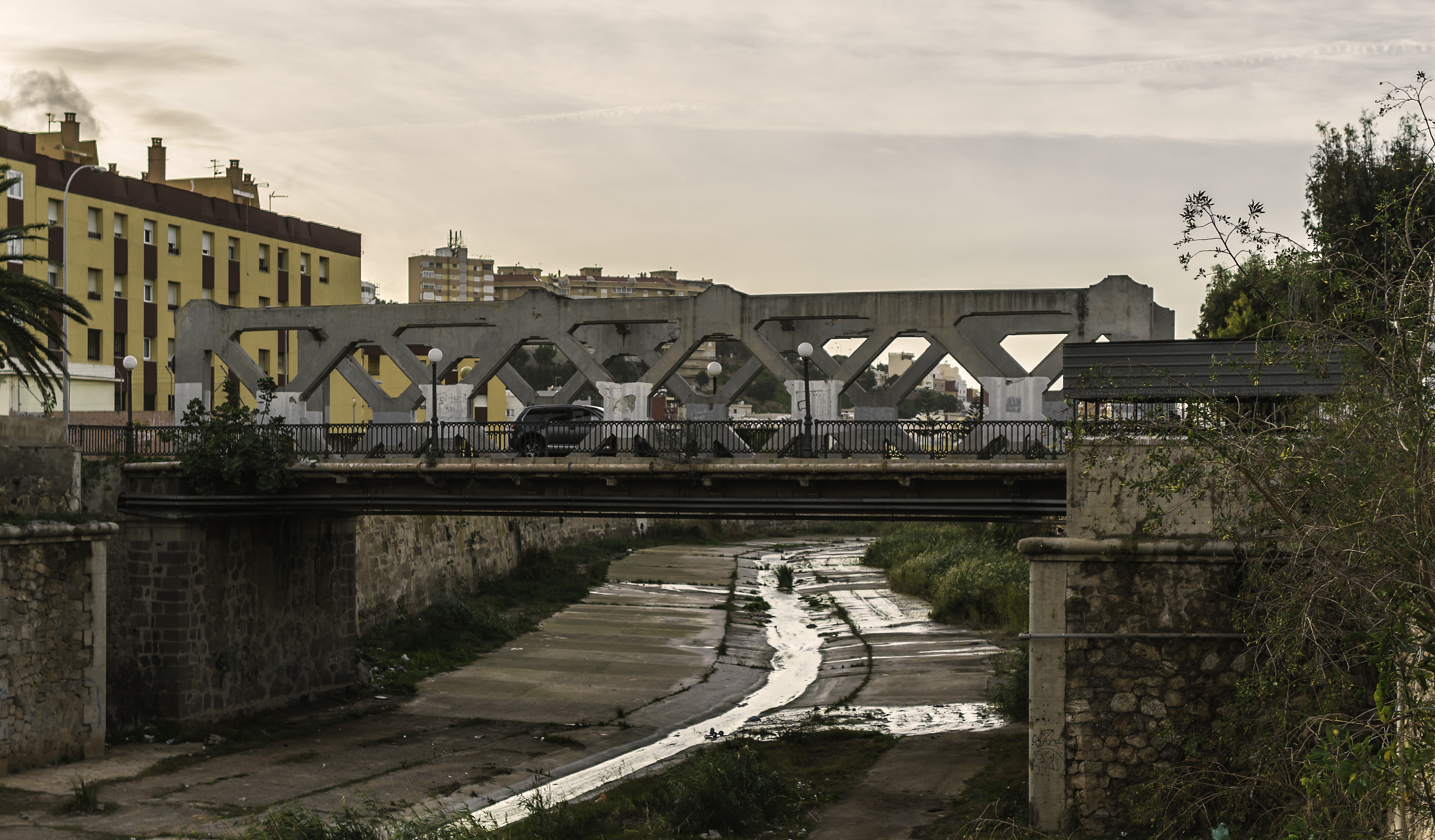
Mineral Bridge

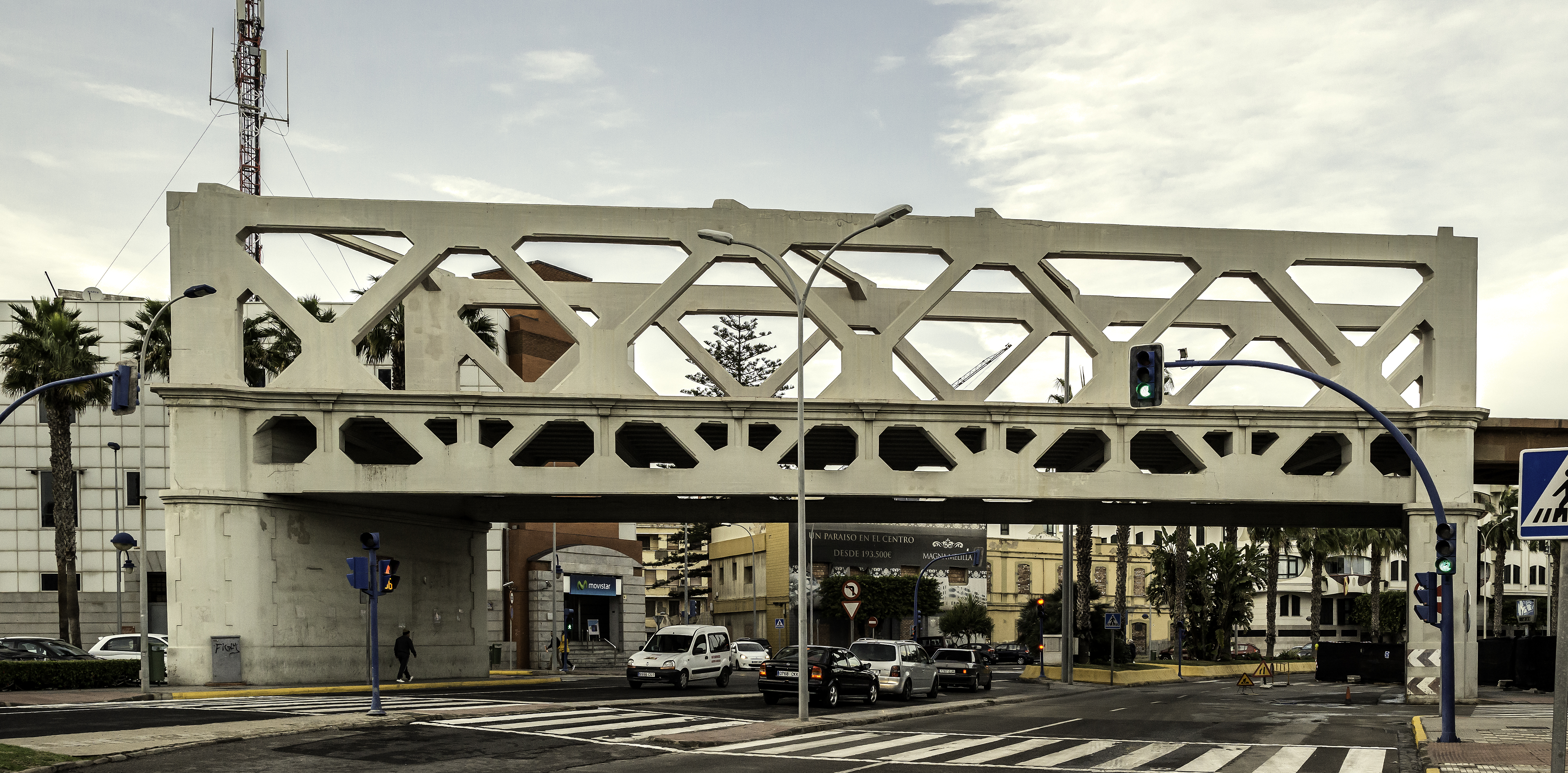
CEMR Viaduct

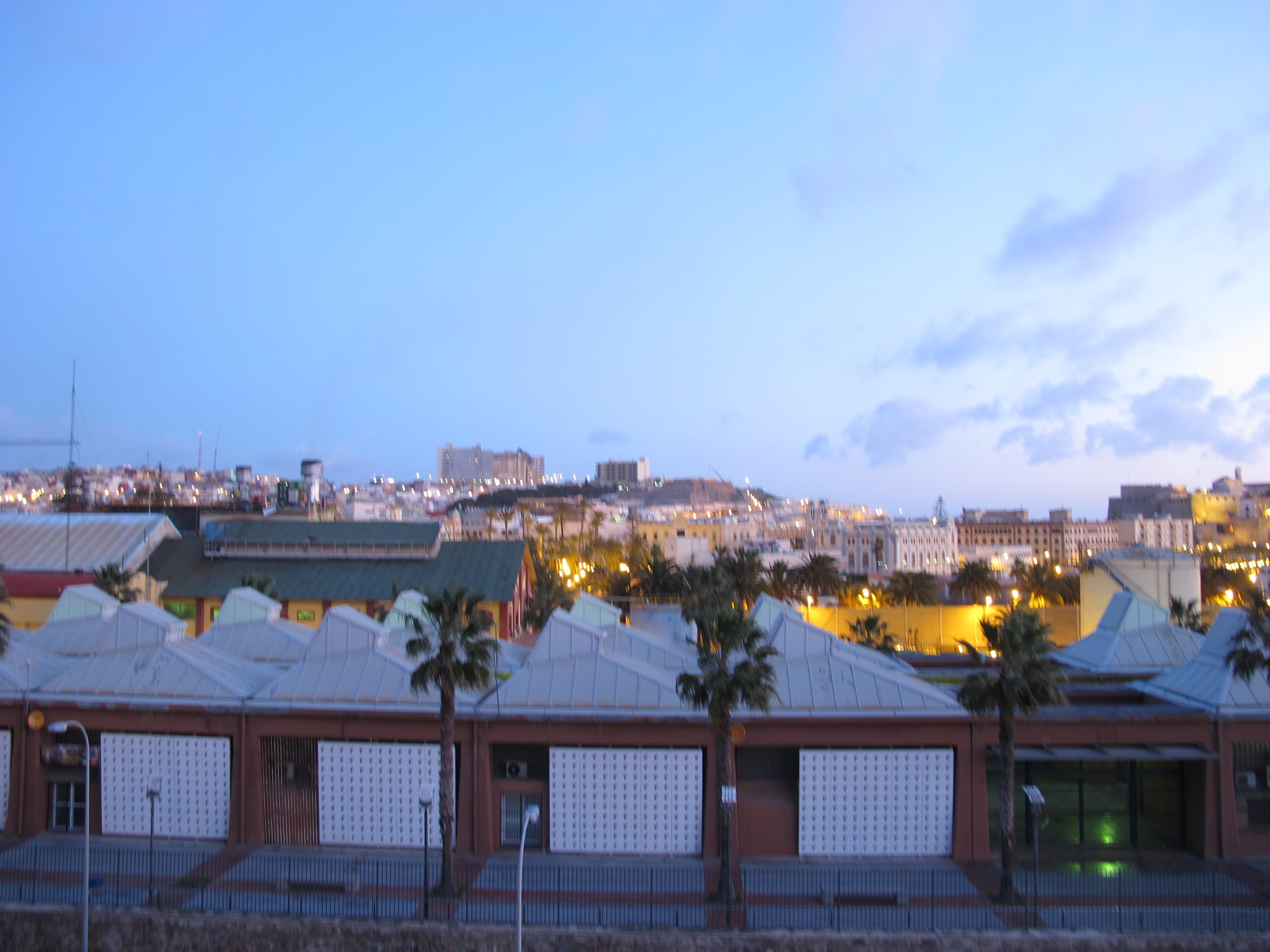
CEMR mineral warehouses

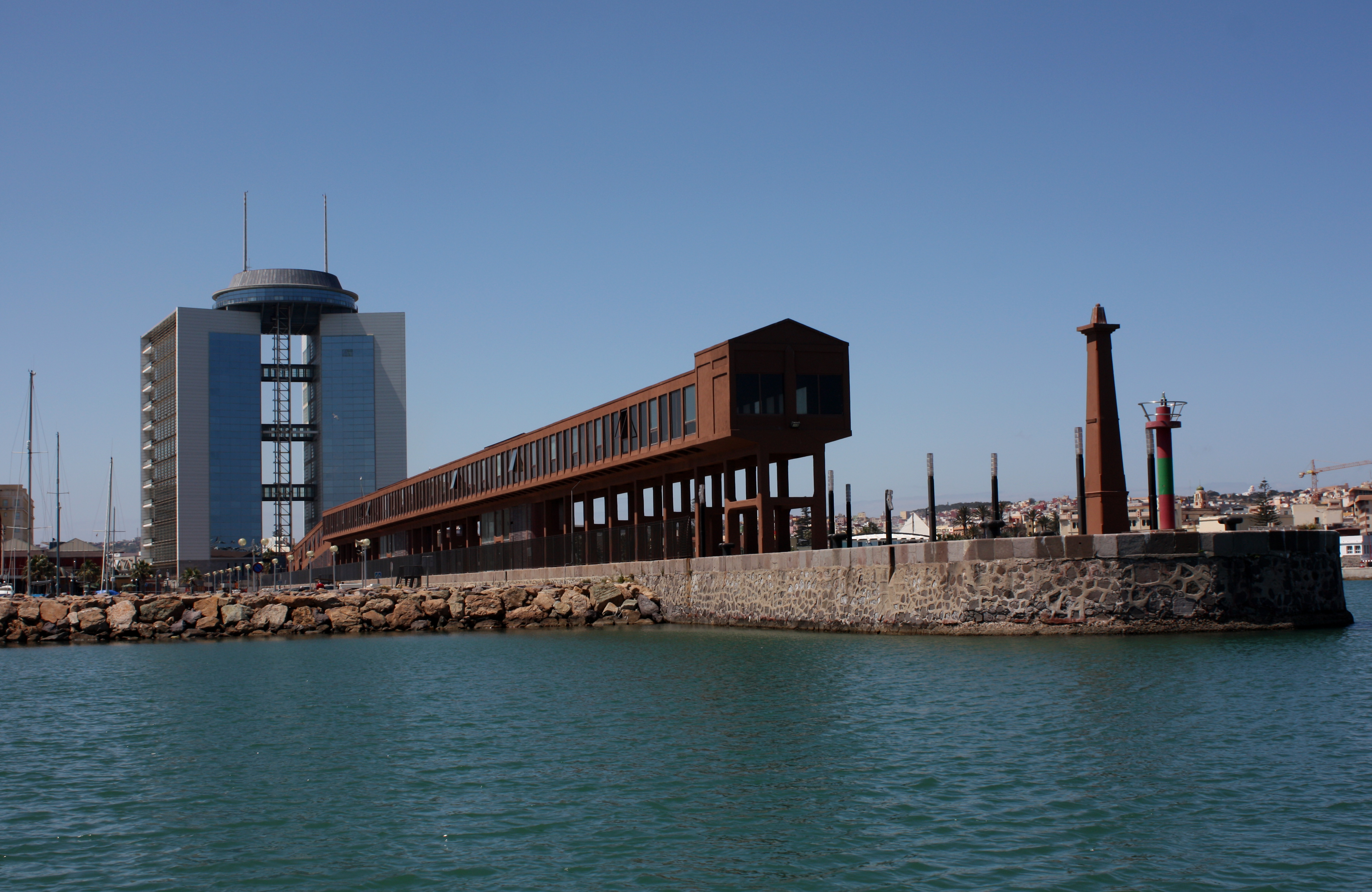
CEMR mineral loading dock

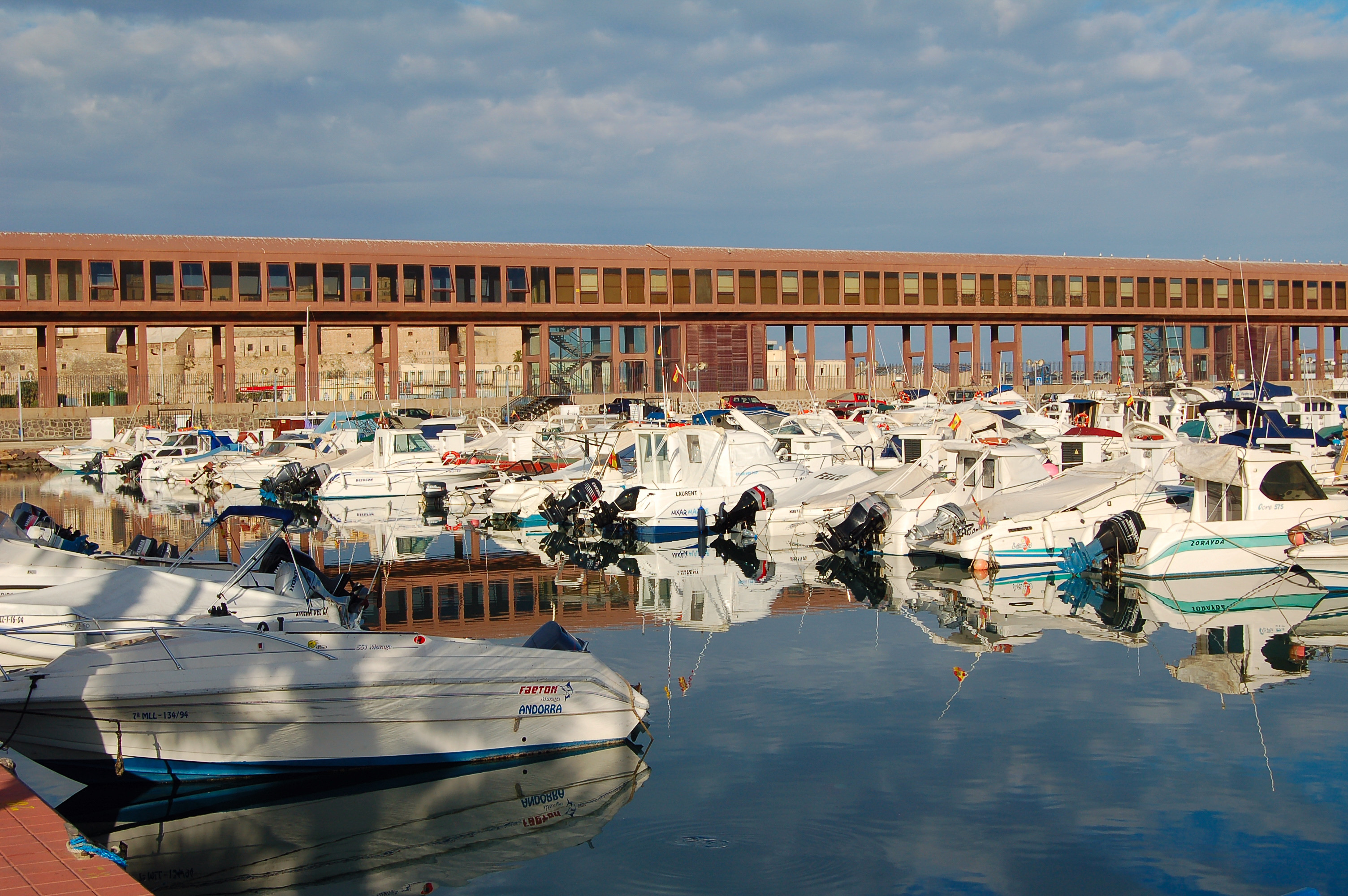
CEMR mineral loading dock

== Modern architecture ==
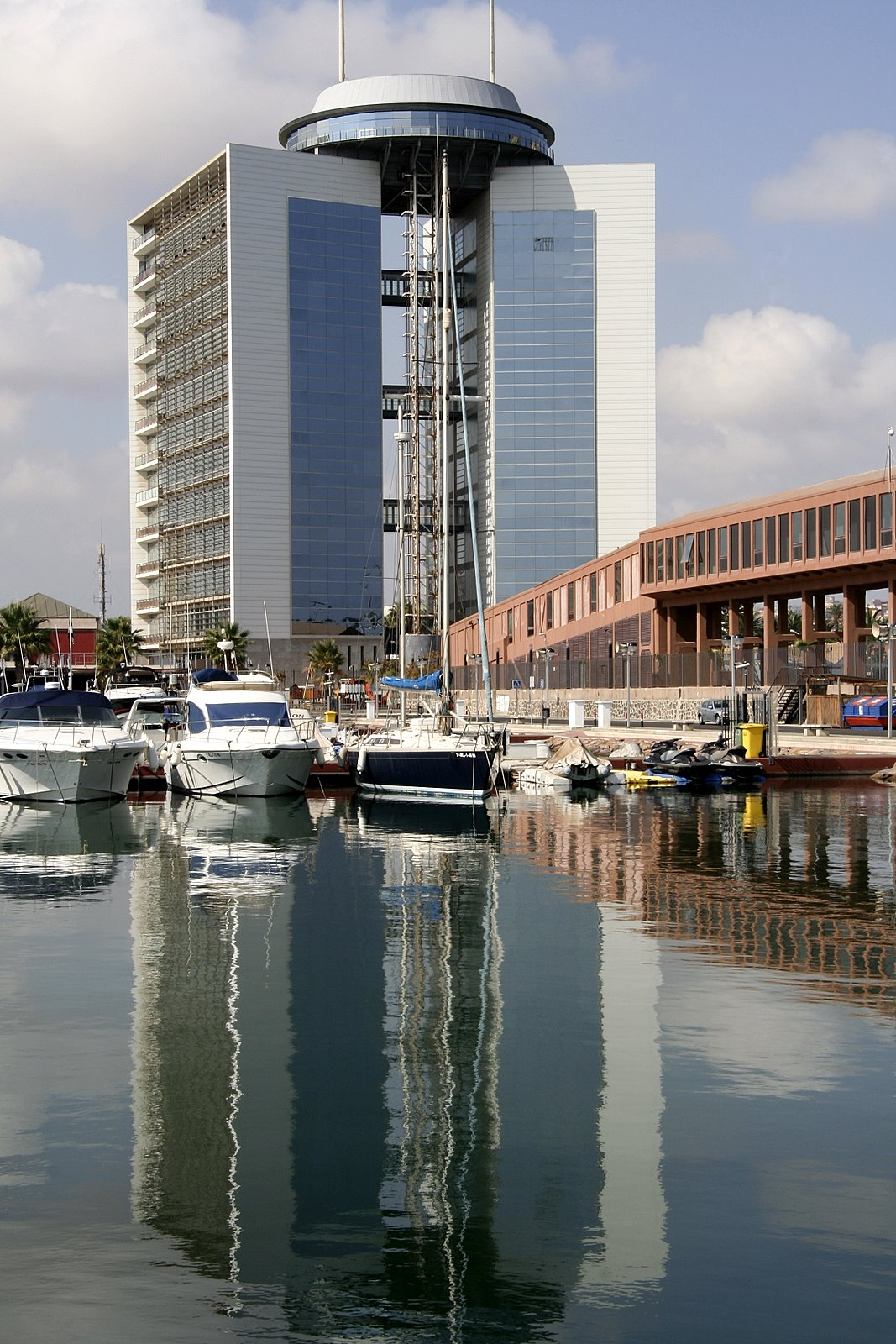
V Centenario Towers

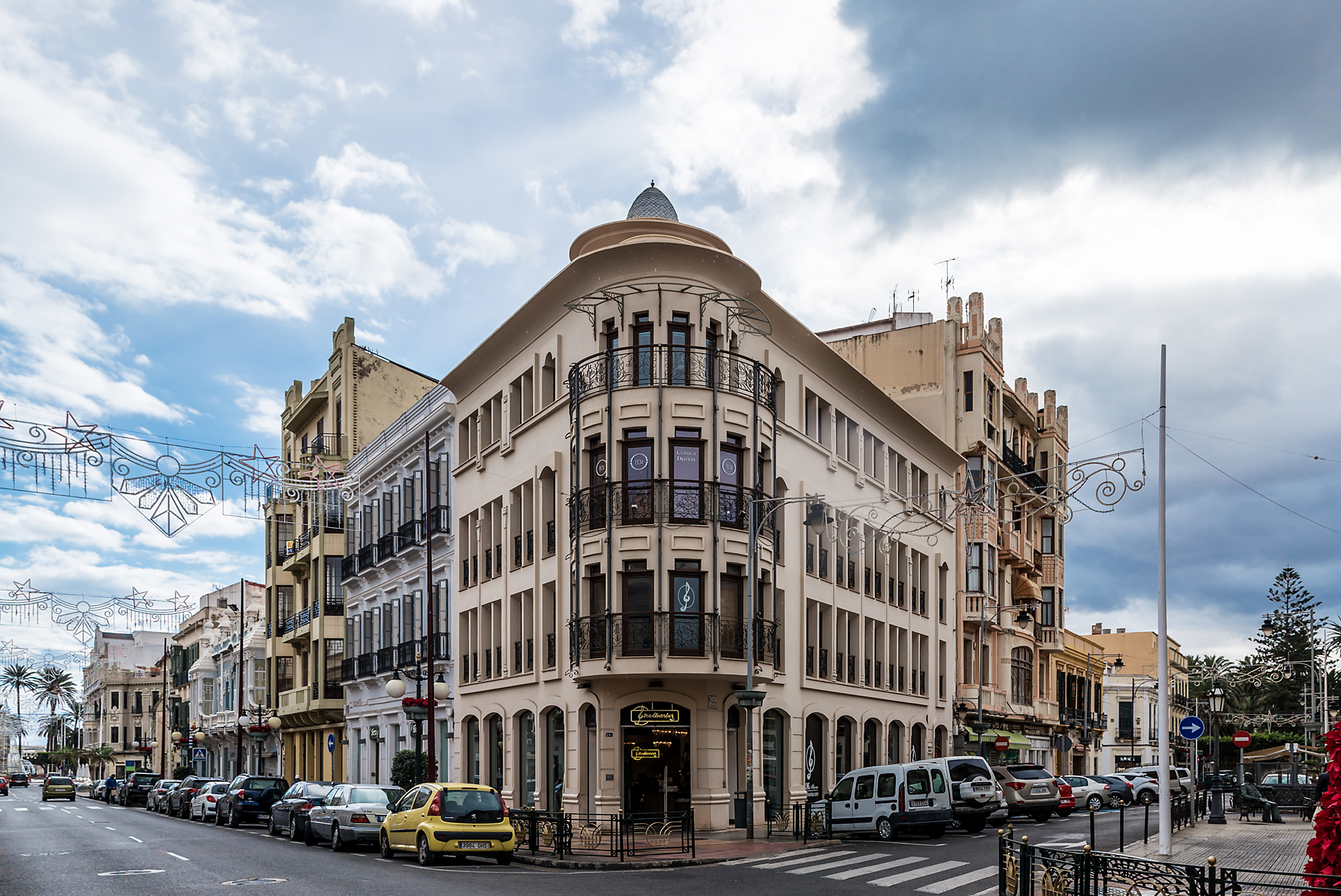
Chacel Building

=== Municipal Cemetery of the Immaculate Conception ===
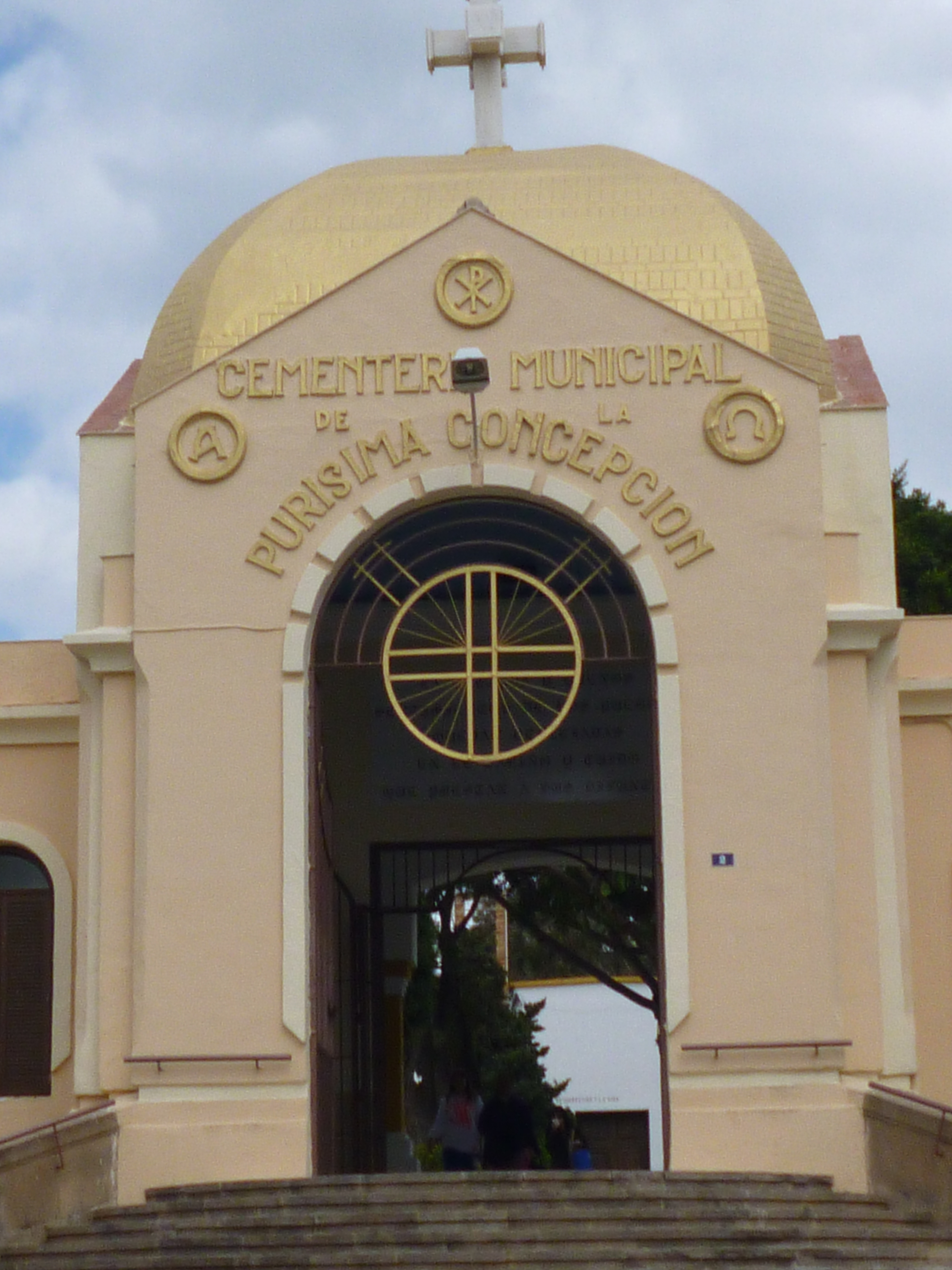
Entrance to the Municipal Cemetery

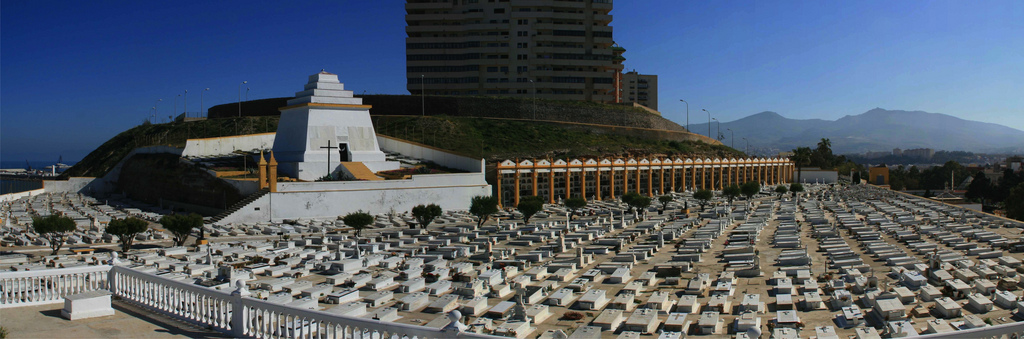
Panoramic view of Municipal Cemetery

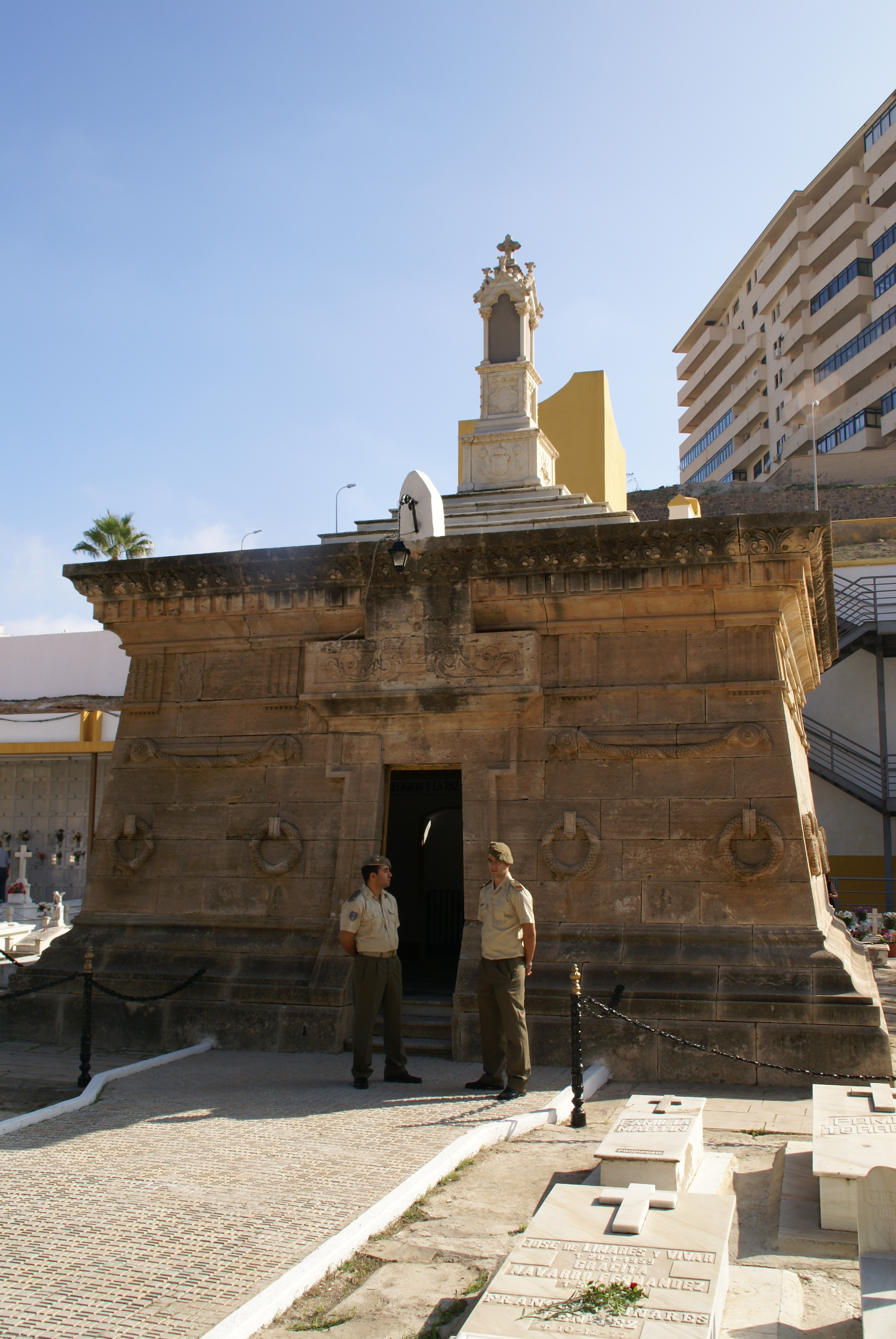
Margallo Pantheon

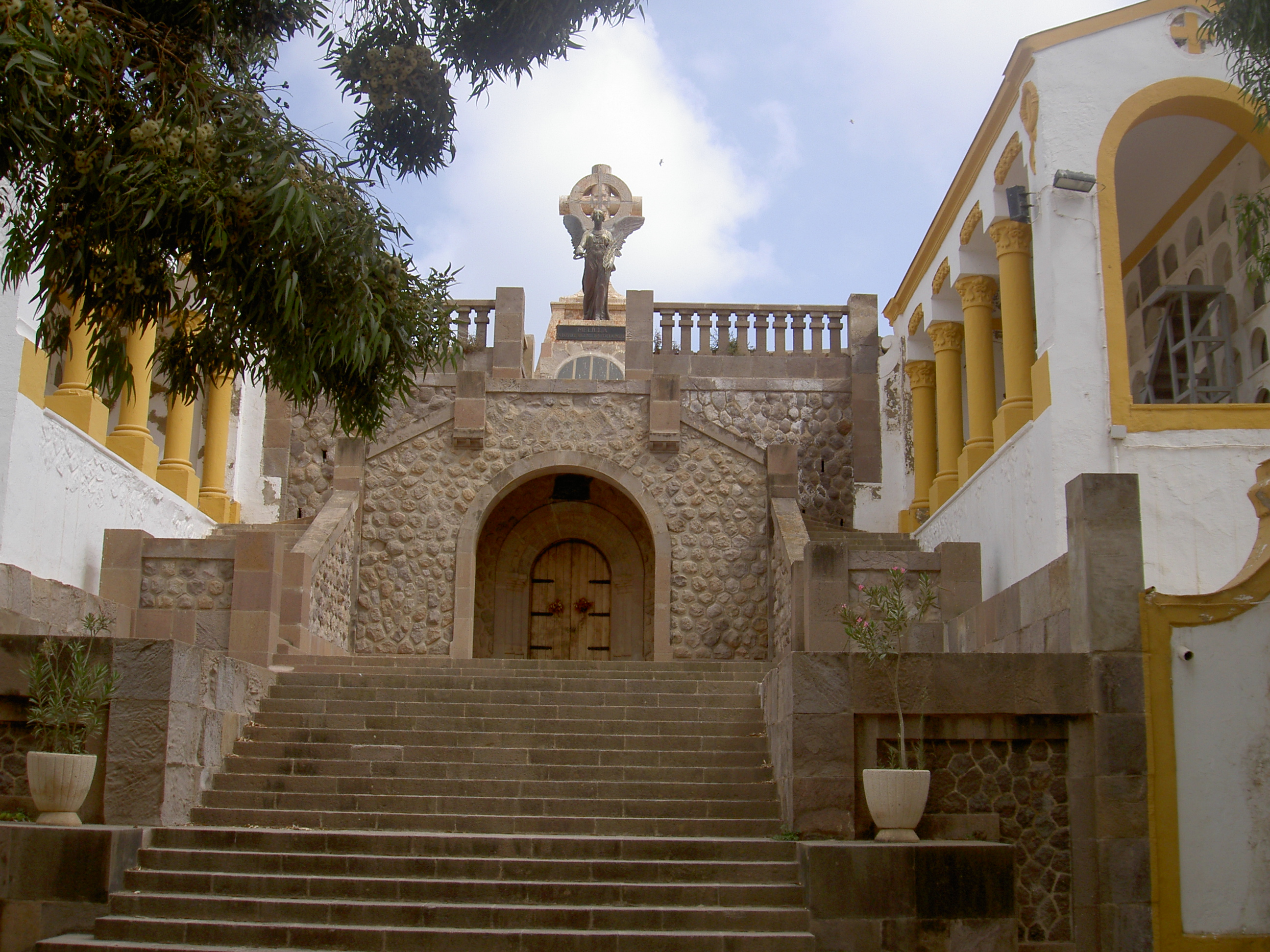
Pantheon of Heroes

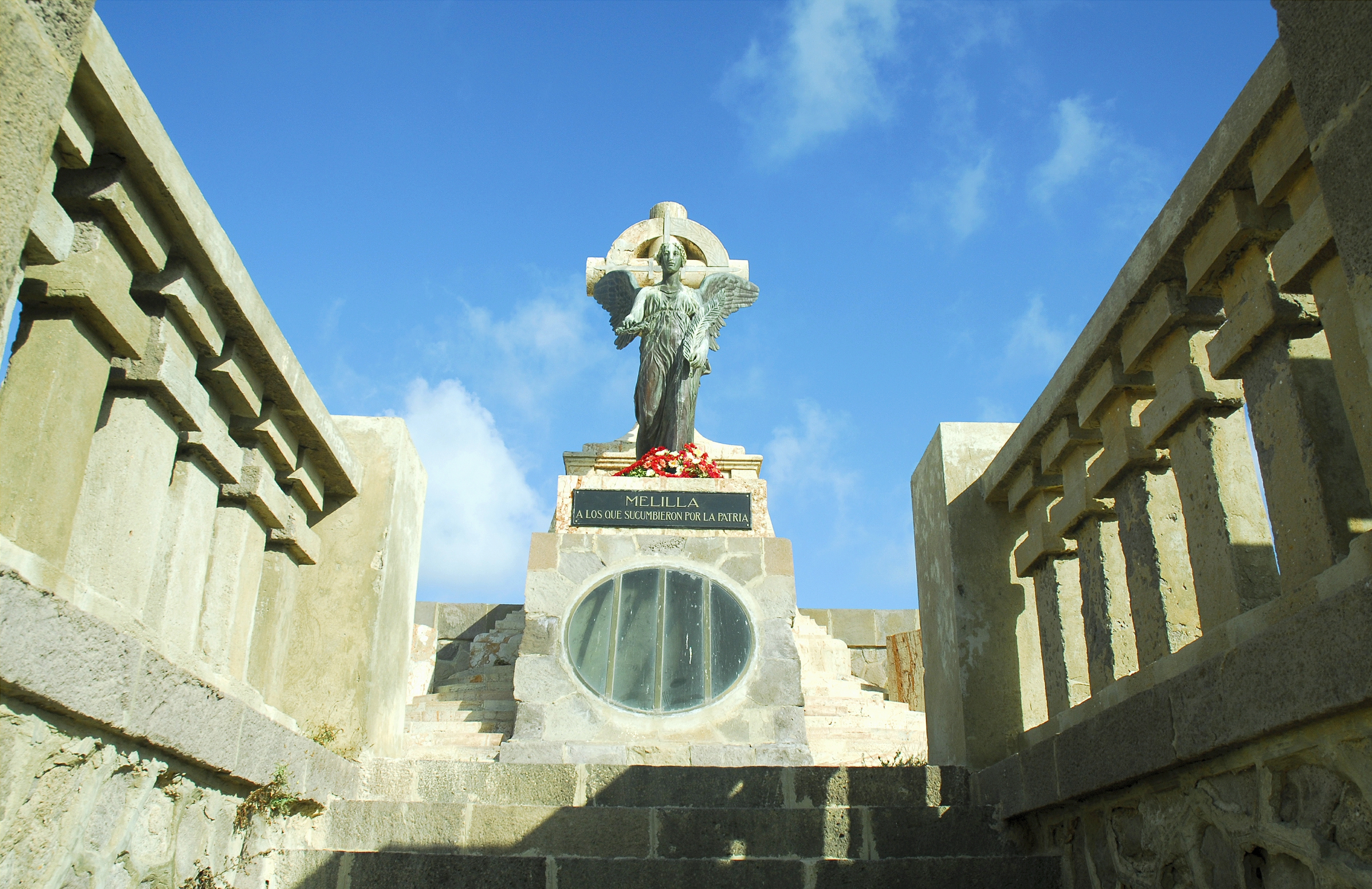
Pantheon of Heroes

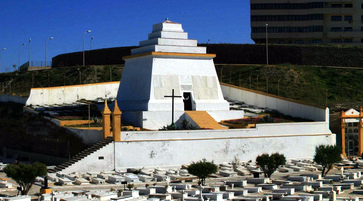
Regular Pantheon number 5

This is Melilla's main cemetery. Its construction by commander of engineers Eligio Suza, contracted by Manuel Fernández Silvestre, began in 1890. The cemetery was inaugurated on January 1, 1892. It is described as an open-air museum due to the many artistic and historic works it contains.

=== Sculptural elements ===
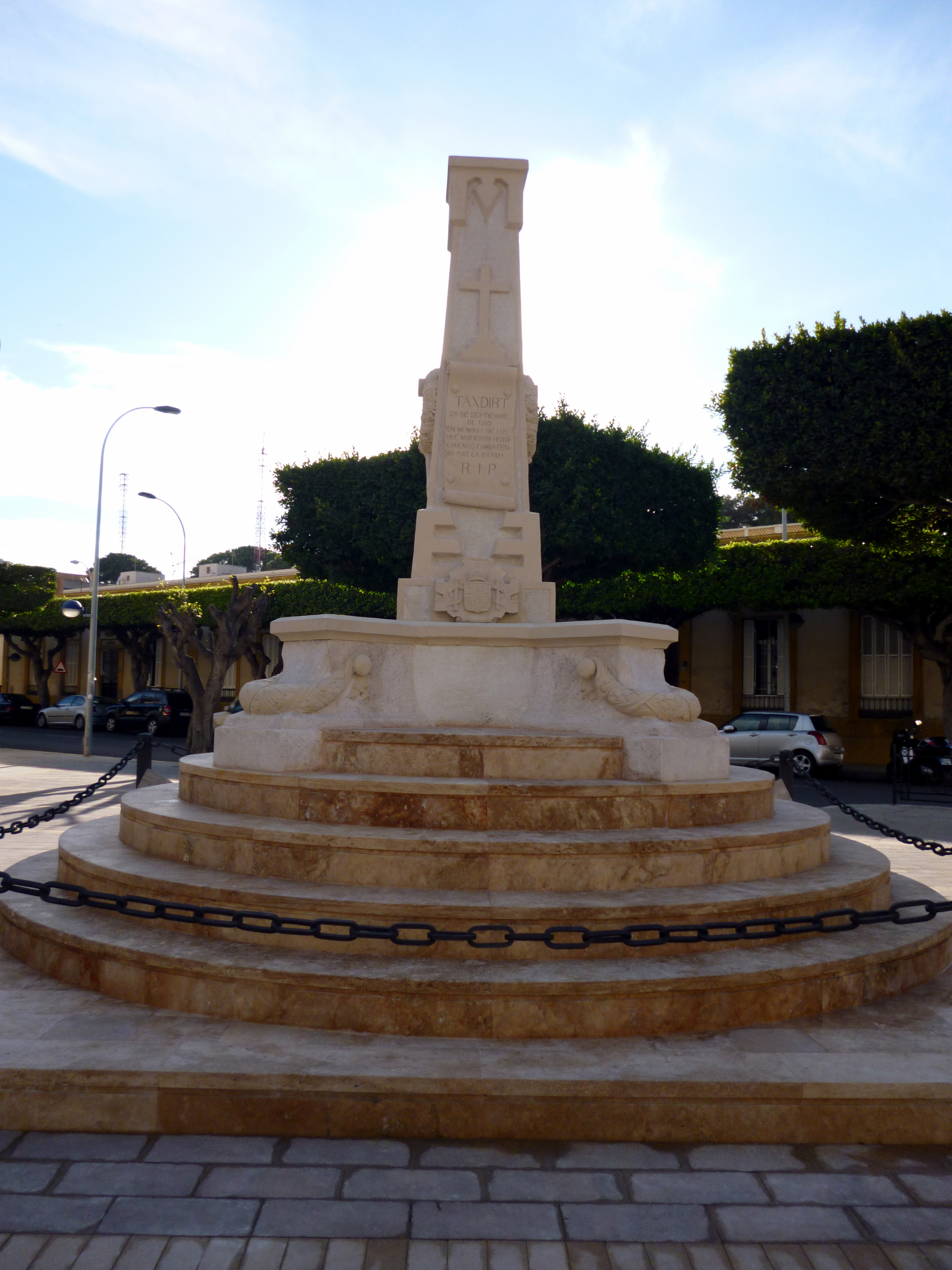
Monument to the Heroes of Taxdirt

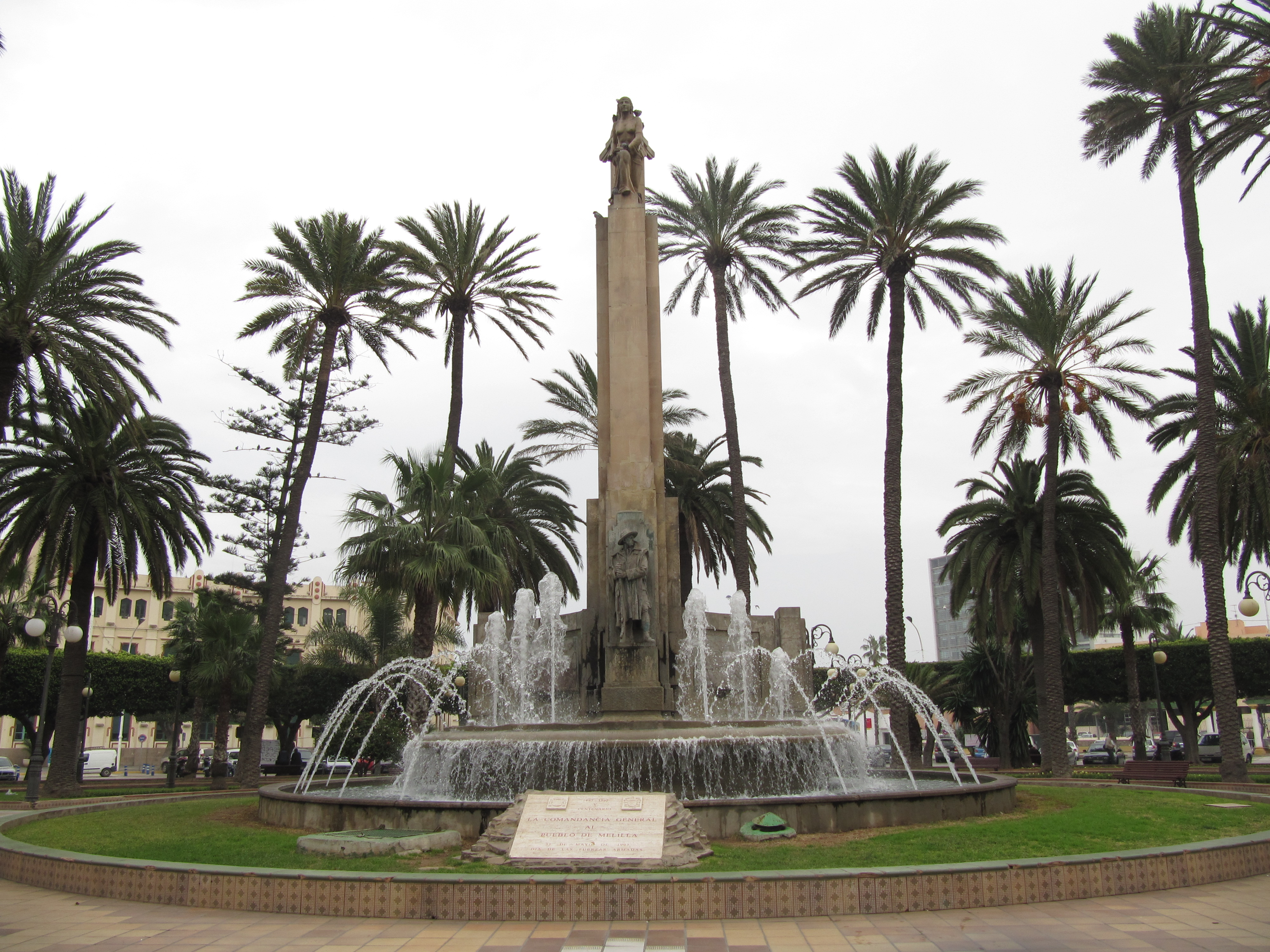
Monument to the Heroes and Martyrs of the Campaigns

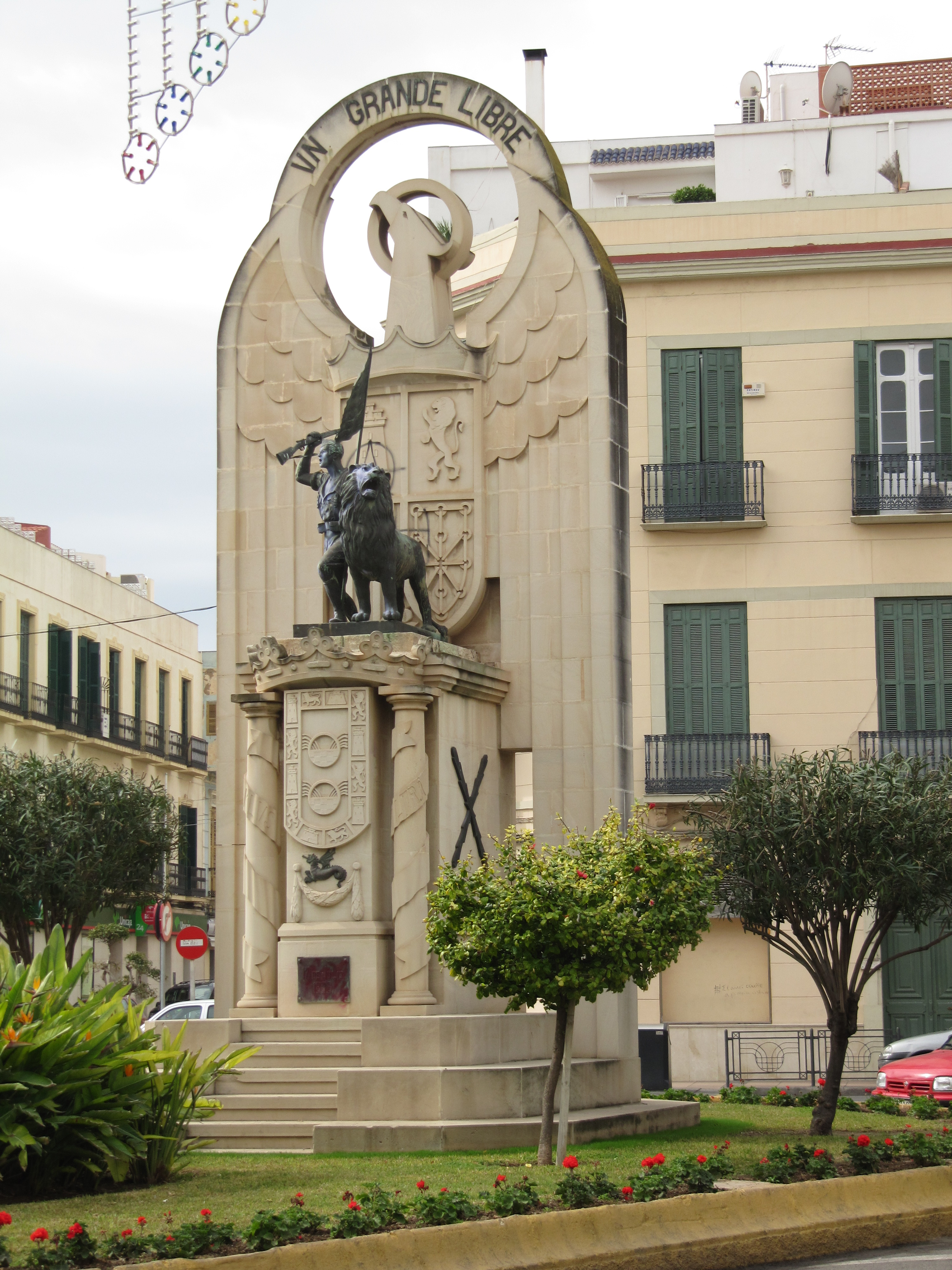
Monument to the Heroes of Spain

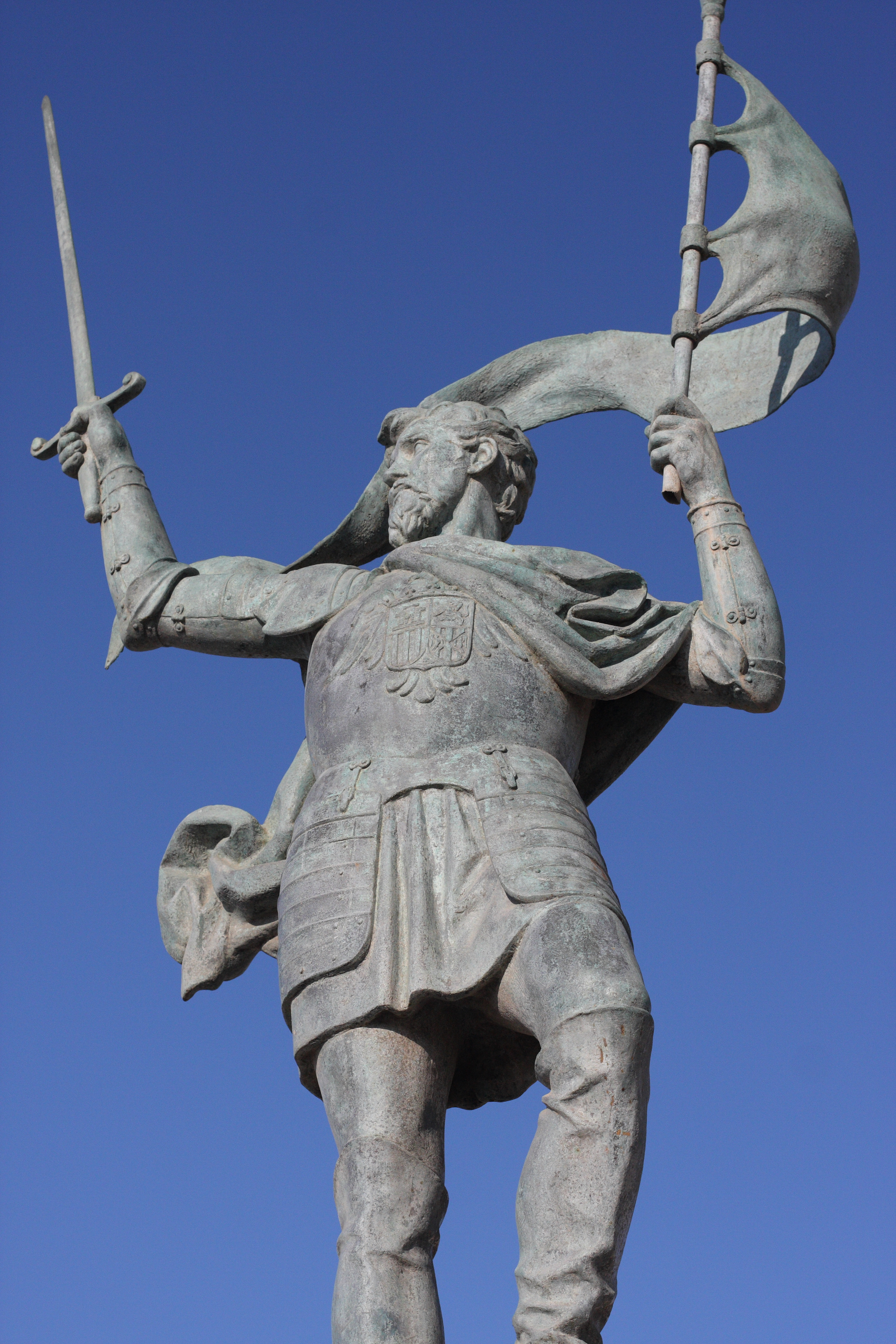
Monument to Pedro de Estopiñán and Virués

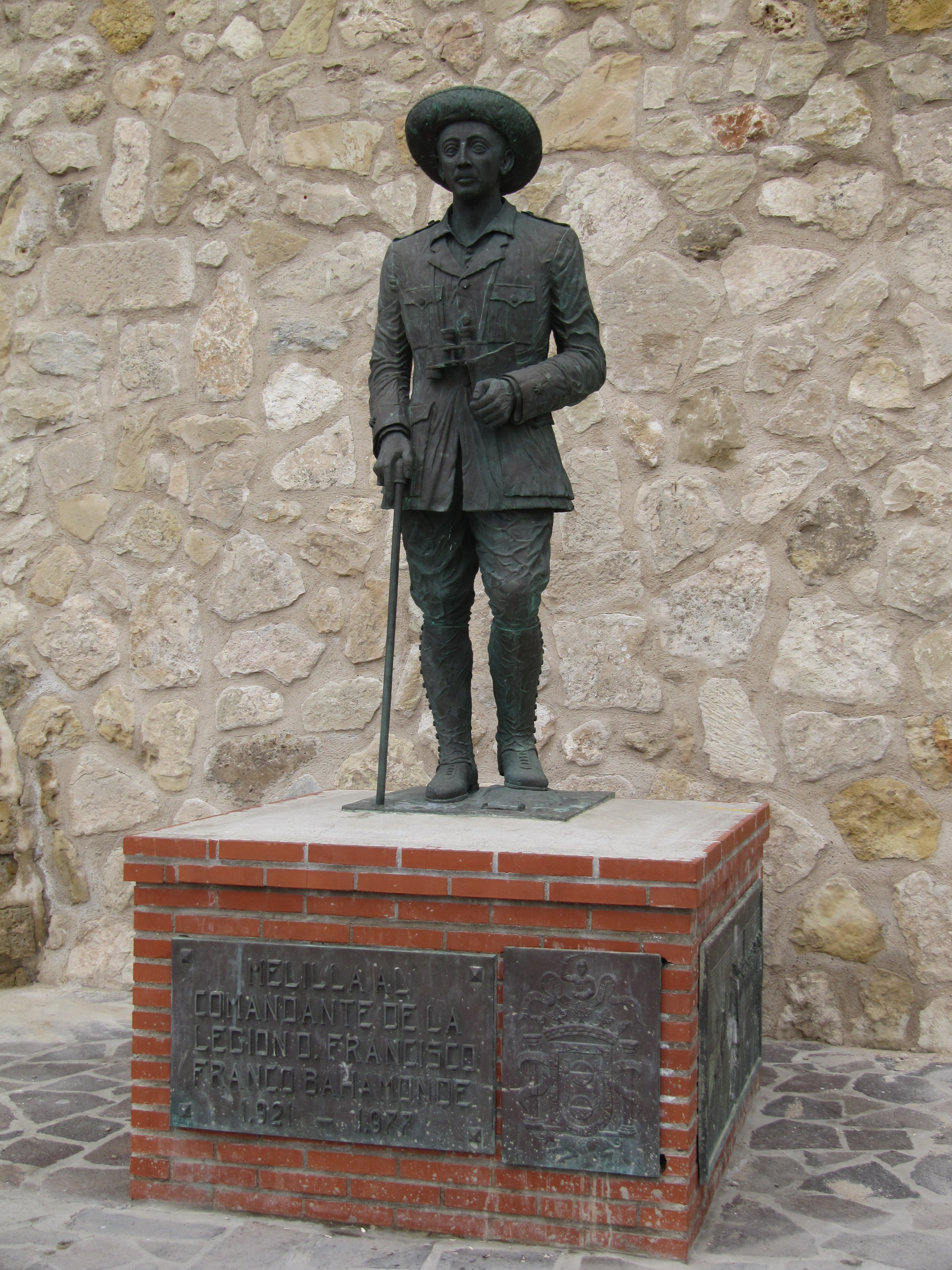
Statue of Legion Commander Francisco Franco Bahamonde

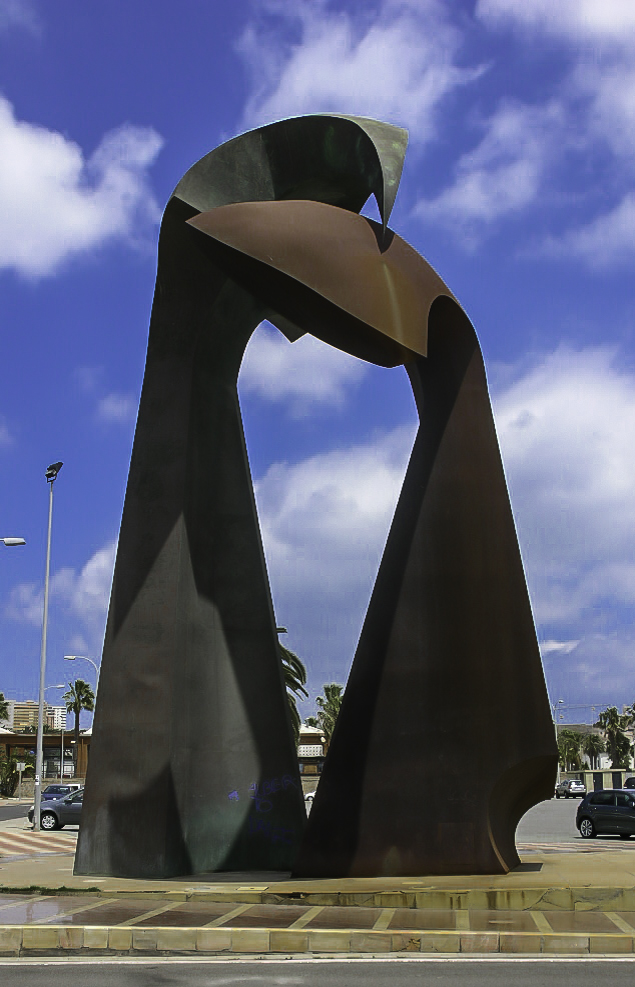
Encuentros (Encounters)

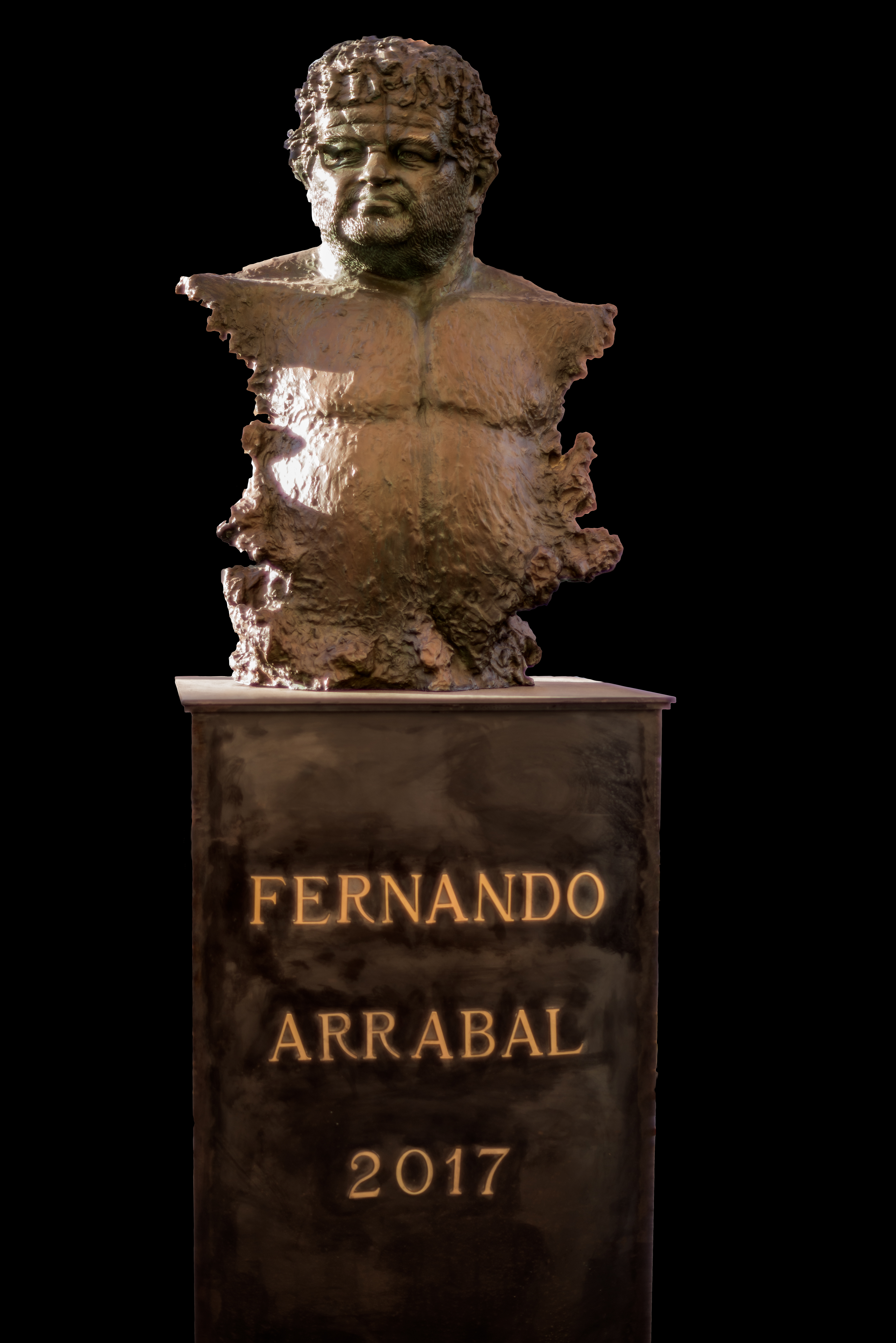
Tribute to Fernando Arrabal

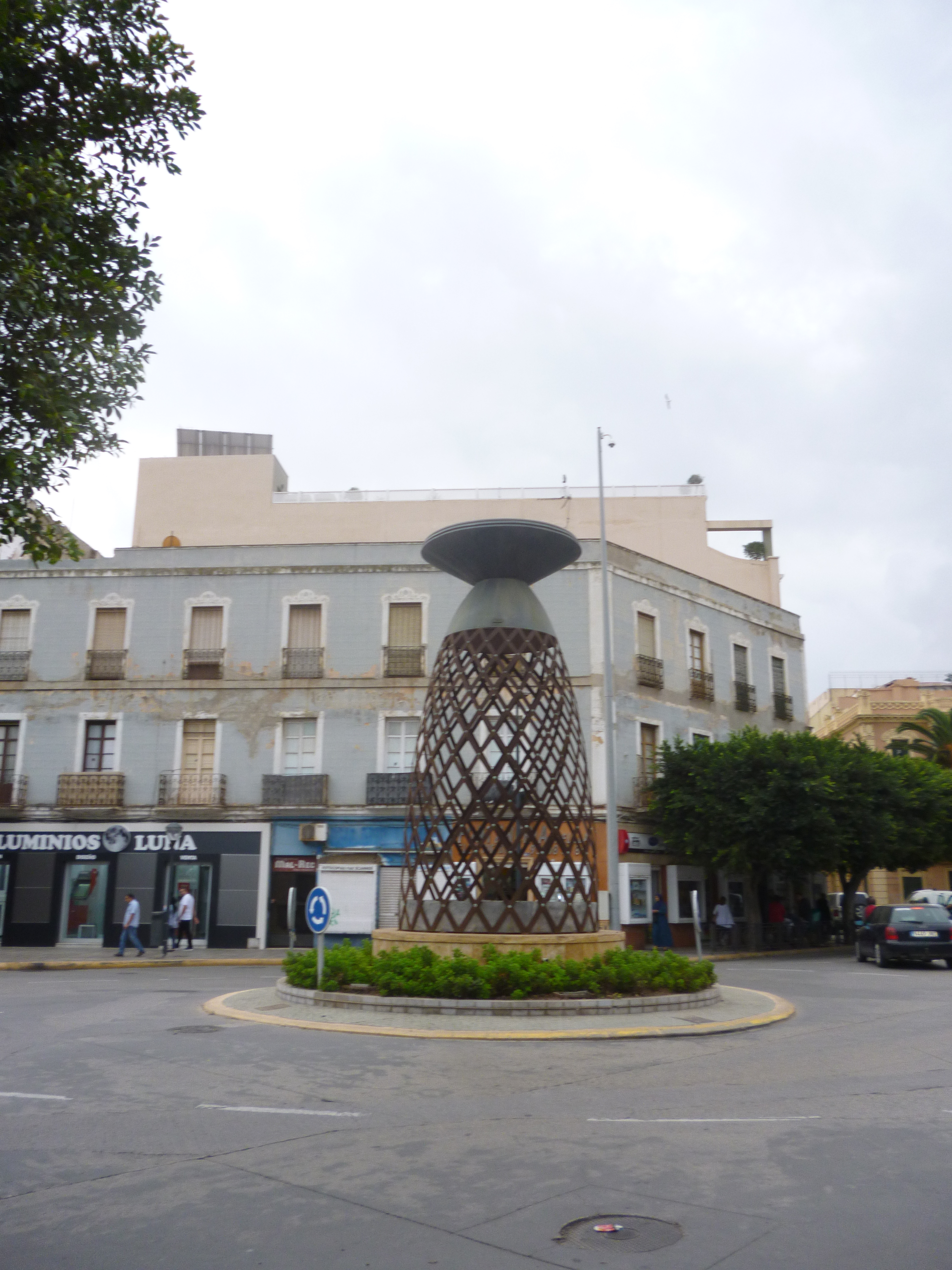
Tribute to Melilla Modernism

=== Squares ===
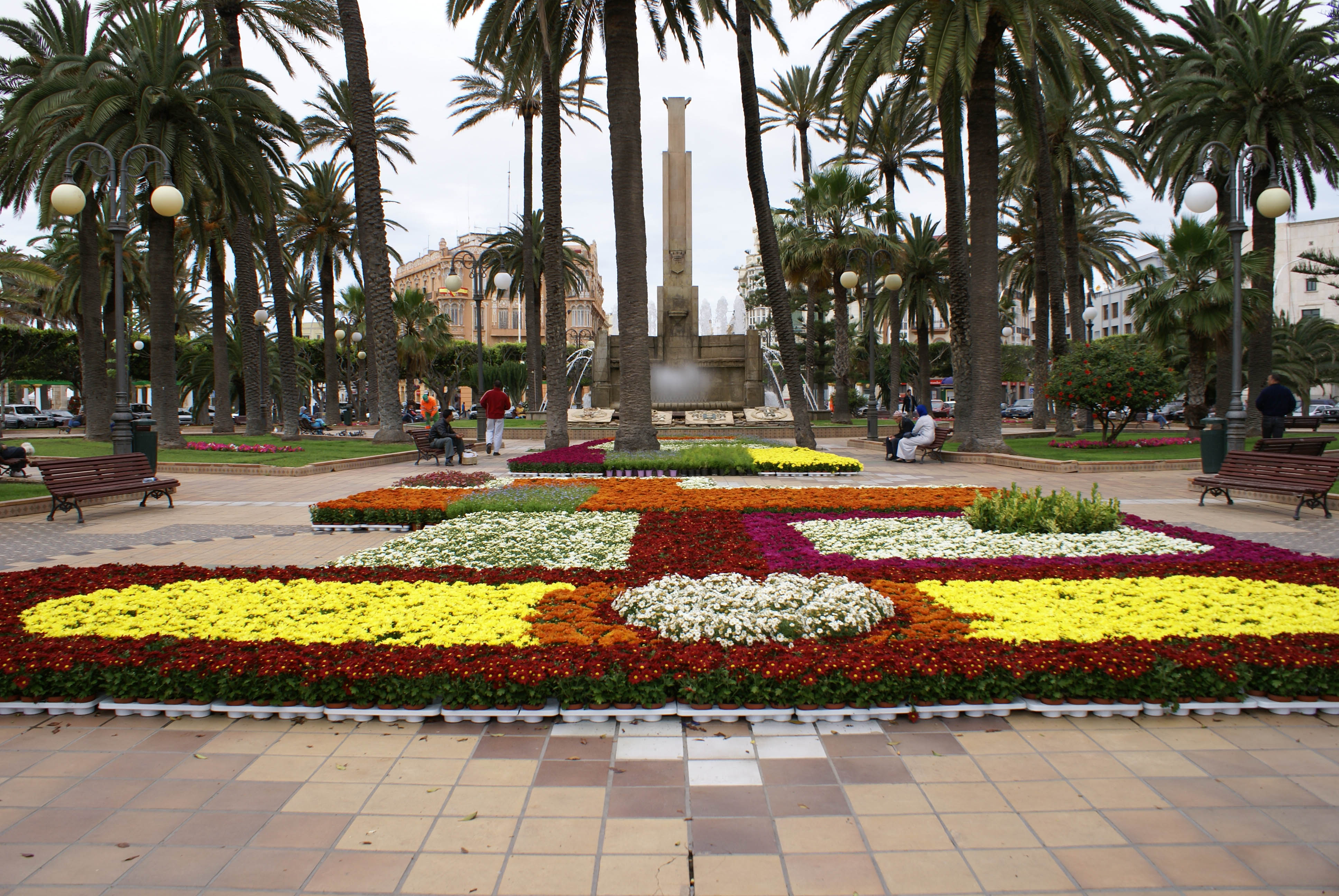
Plaza de España.

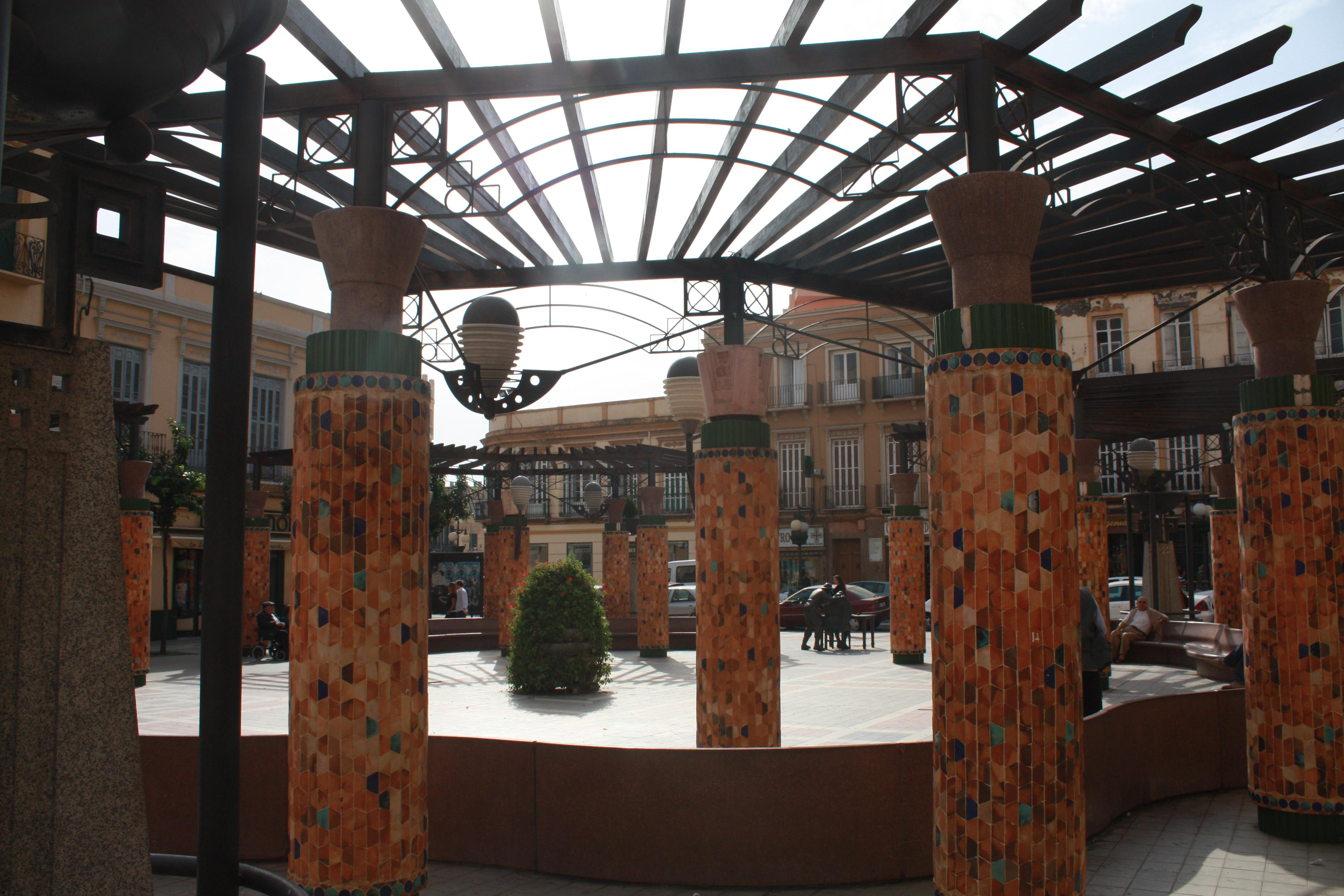
Plaza Menéndez Pelayo

=== Parks ===
==== Hernandez Park ====
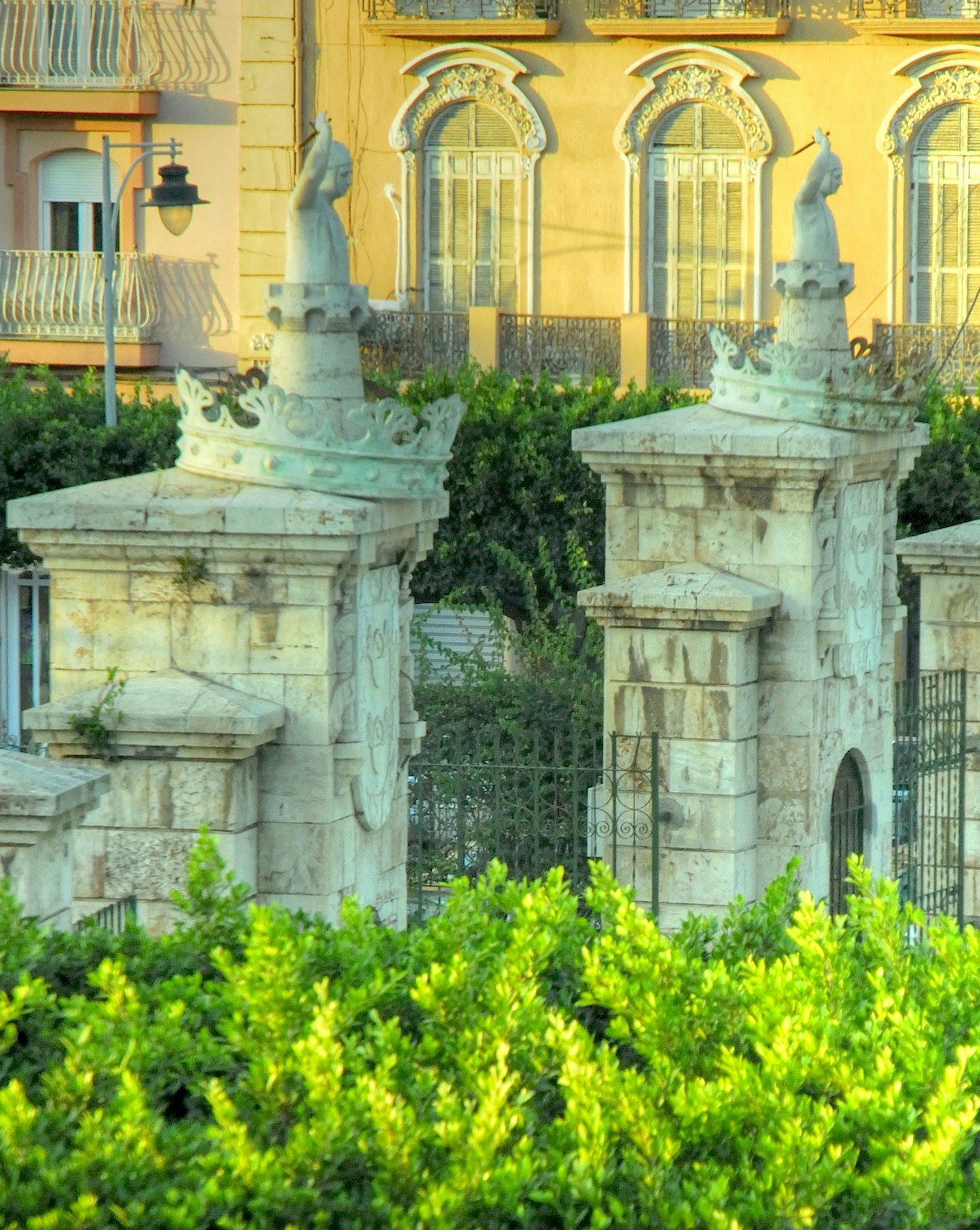
Hernandez Park

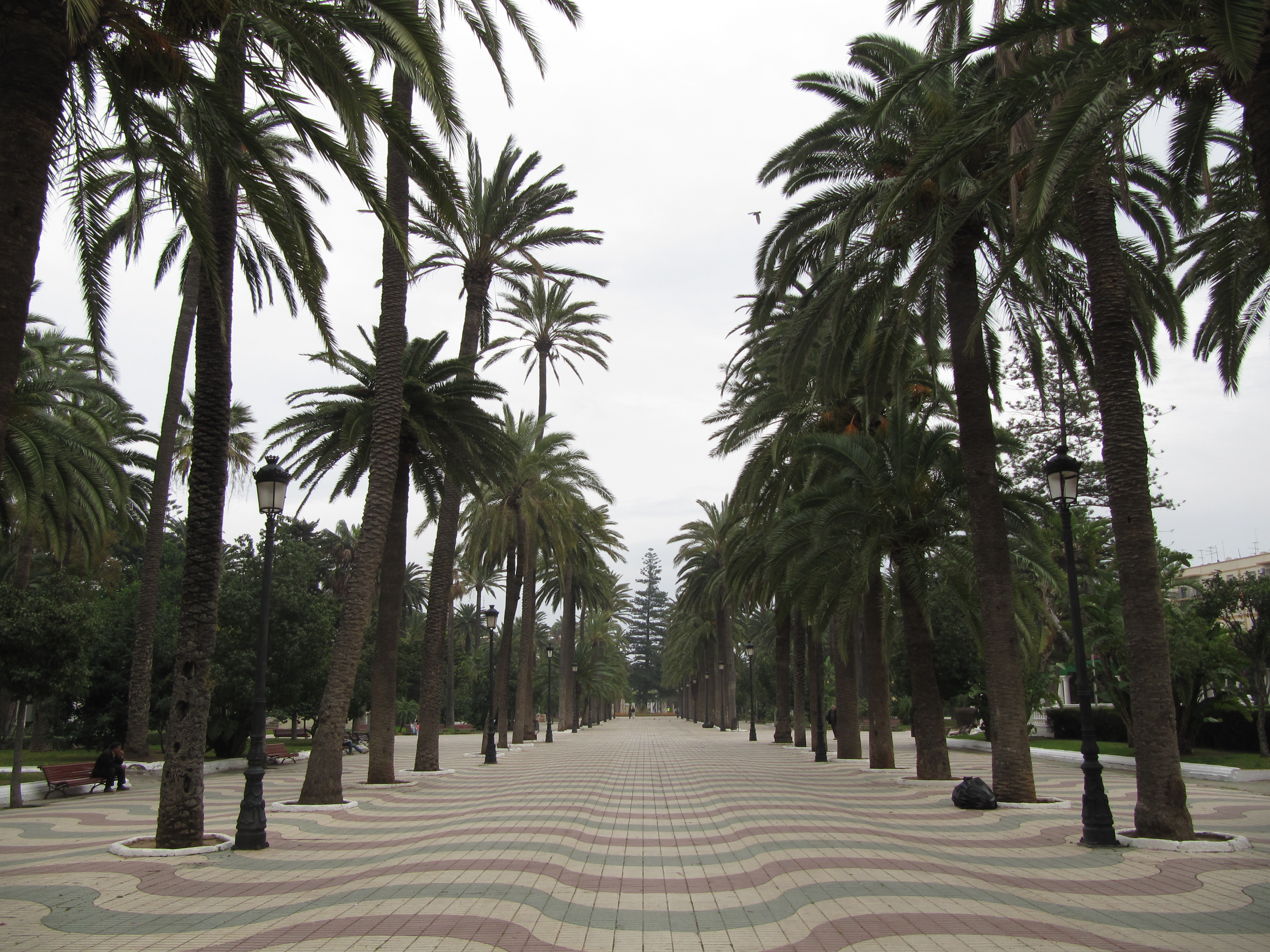
Hernandez Park

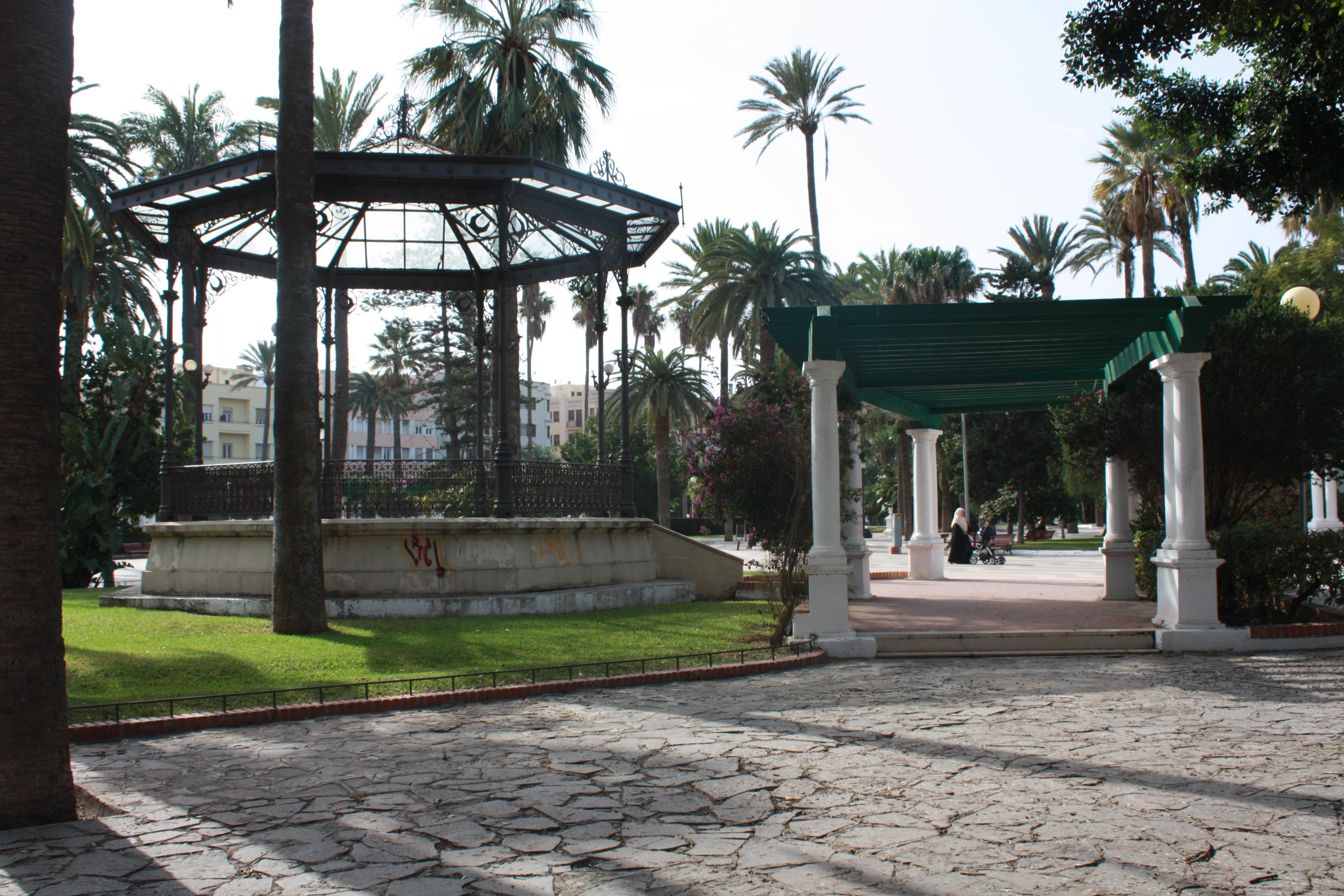
Hernandez Park

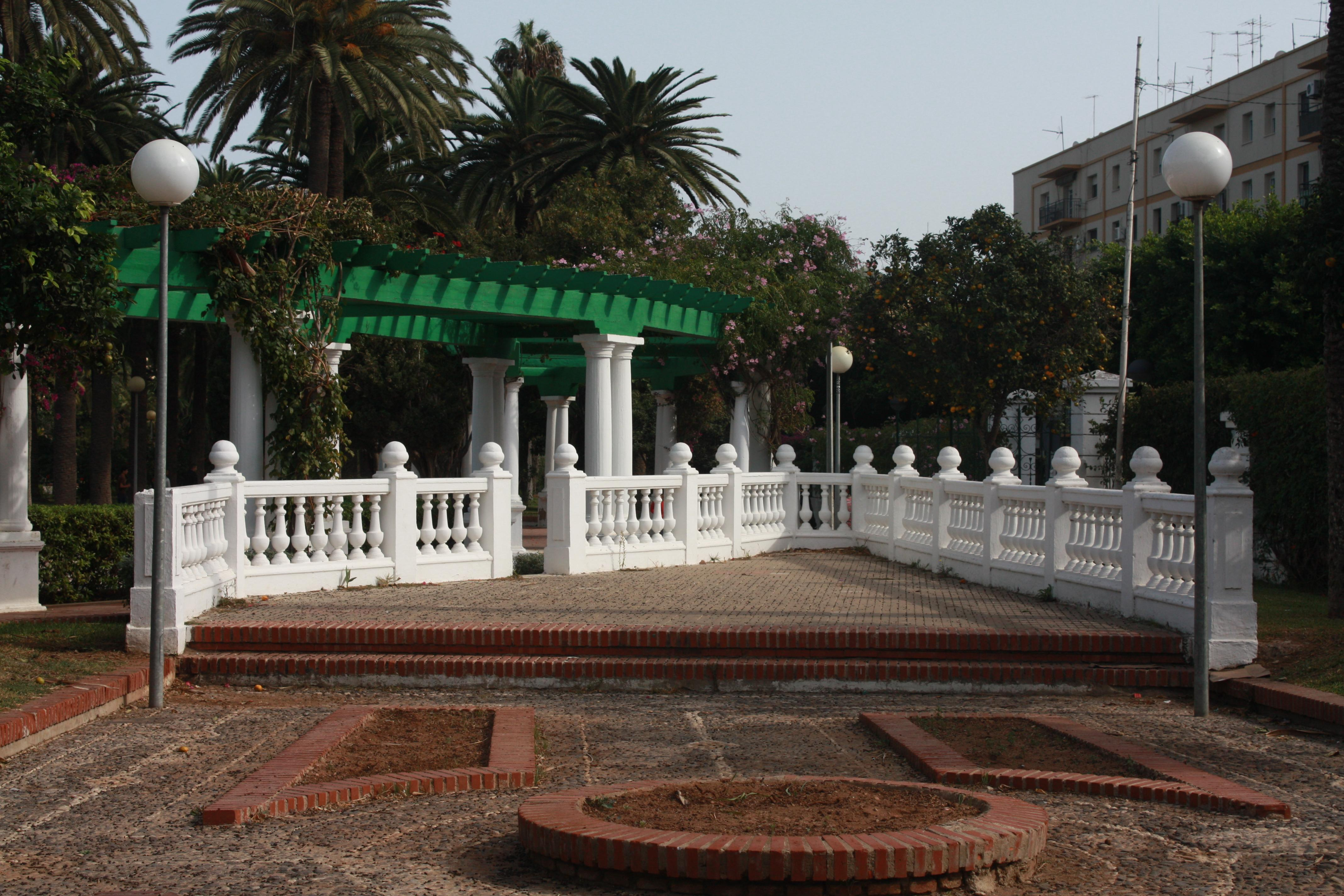
Hernandez Park

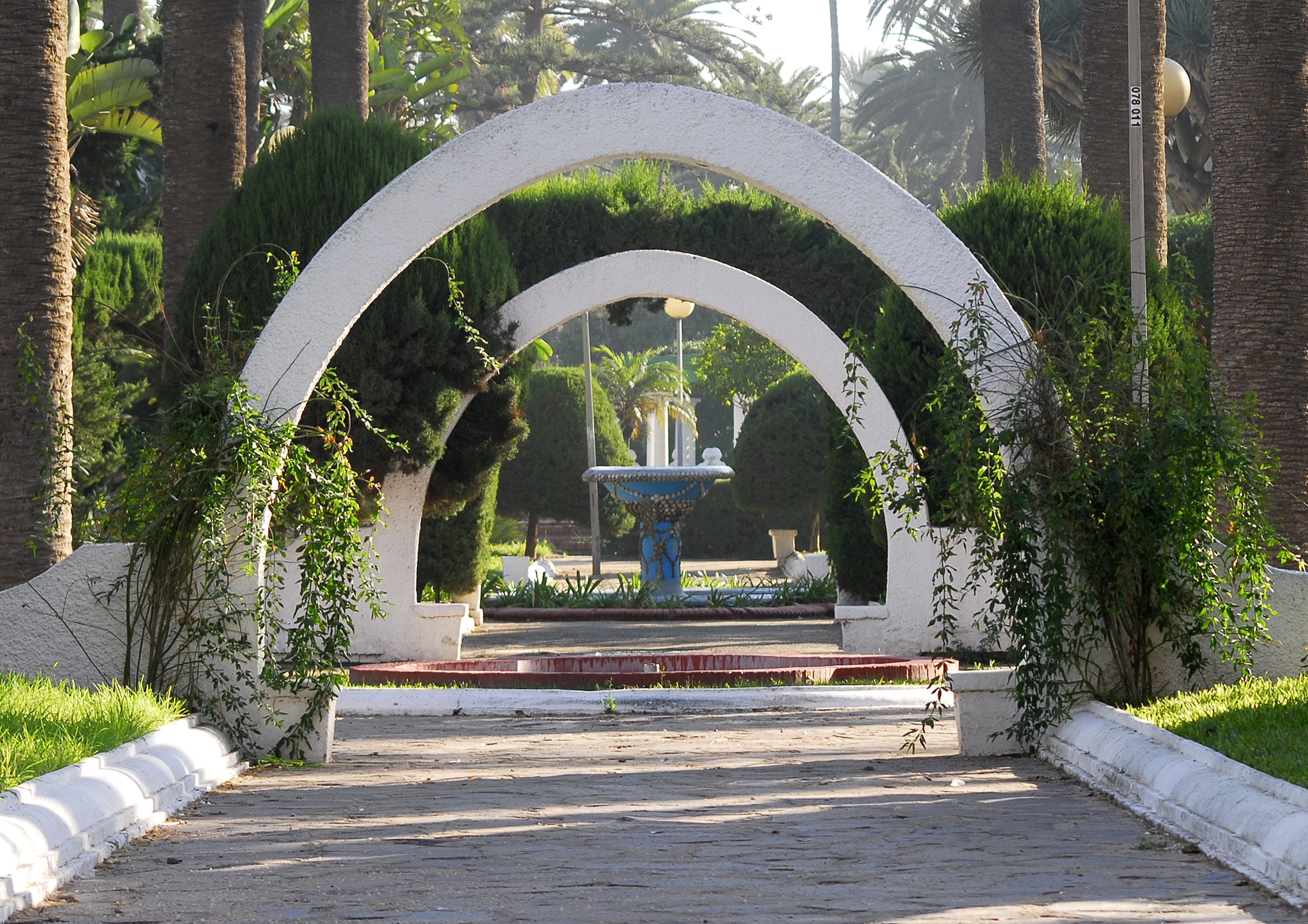
Hernandez Park

Hernandez Park, built in 1902, is the most important park in Melilla. The trapezoid-shaped park was designed by engineer Vicente García del Campo and is located in Melilla's Plaza de España.

==== Lobera Park ====
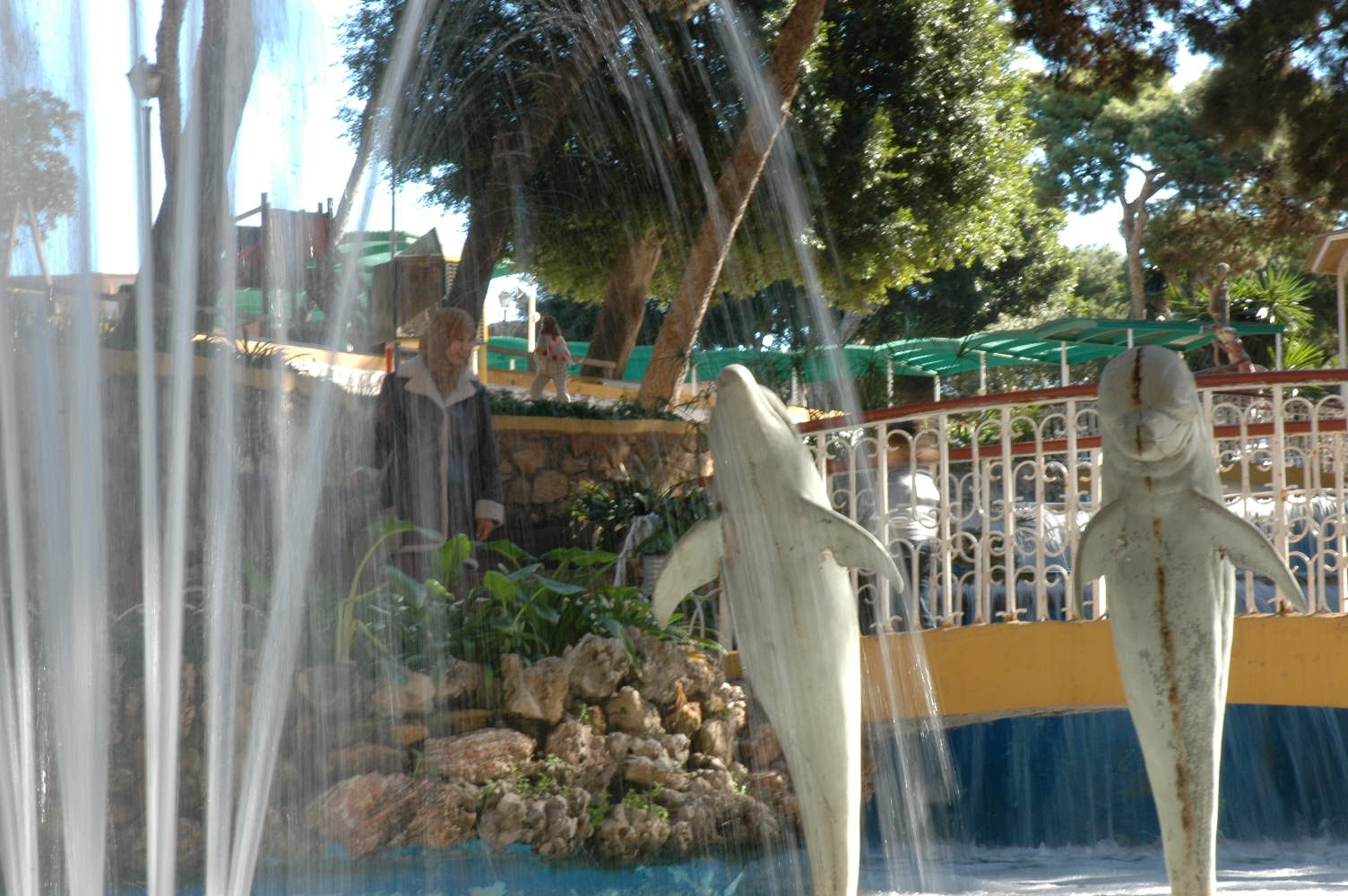
Dolphin Fountain

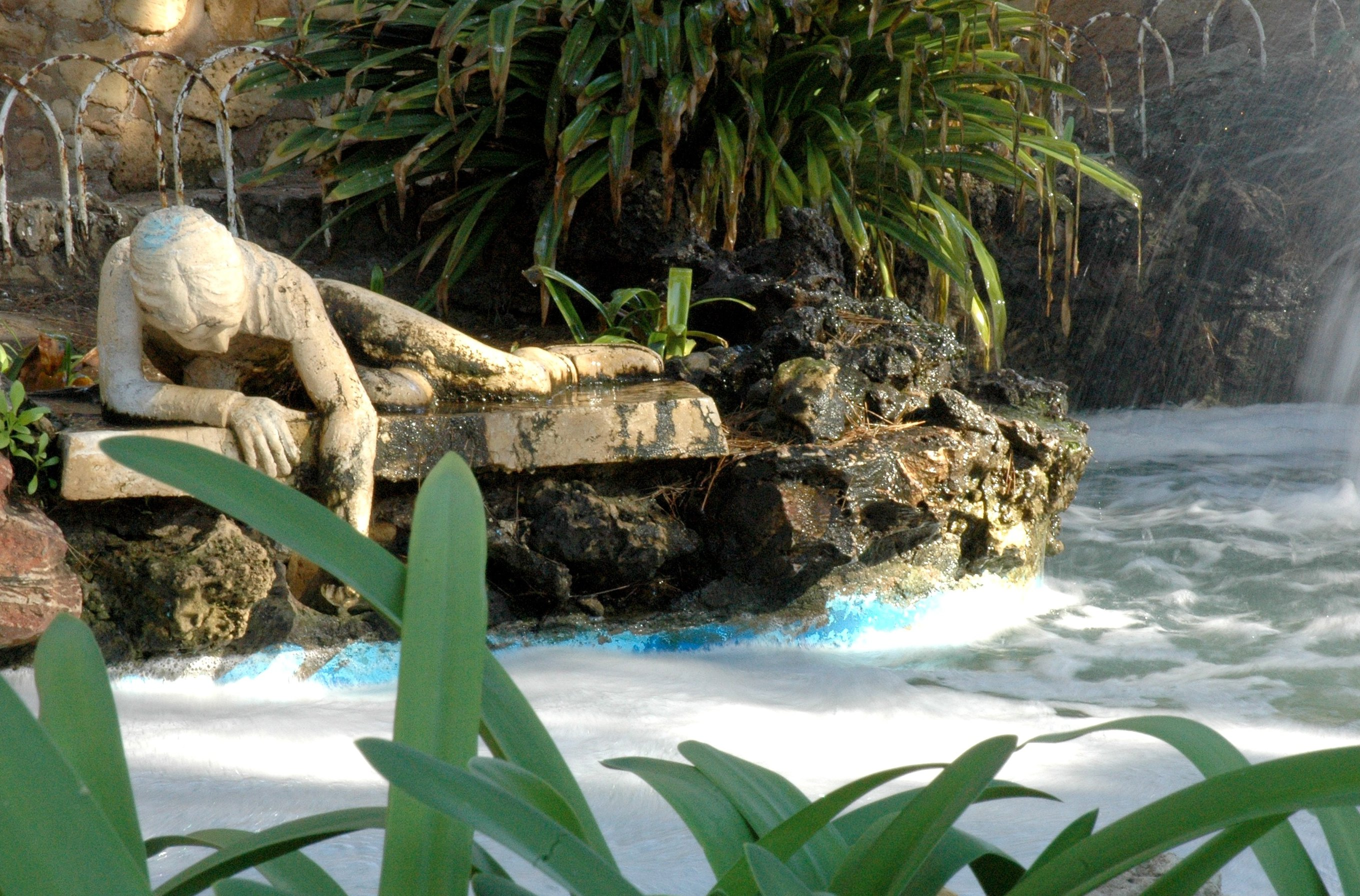
Sculpture and fountain

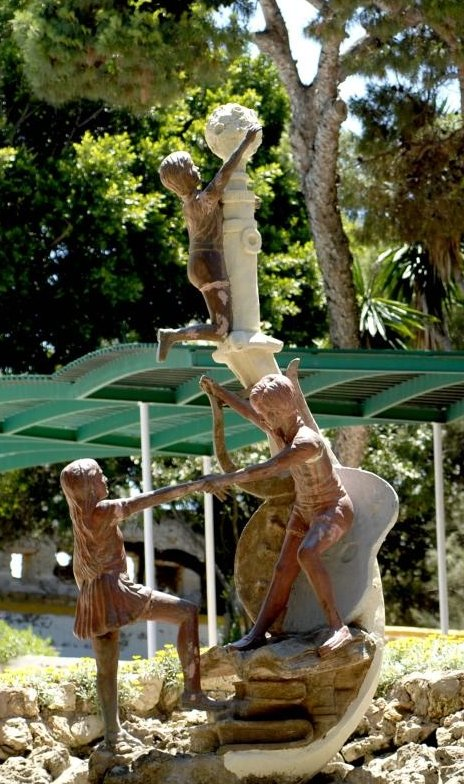
Sculpture of children climbing

Lobera Park is named after its founder Cándido Lobera Girela—soldier, journalist, professor, and politician—who, as president of the Board of Arbitration, created this park to prevent the construction of low-cost housing on his land.

==== Juan Carlos I Rey Forest Park ====
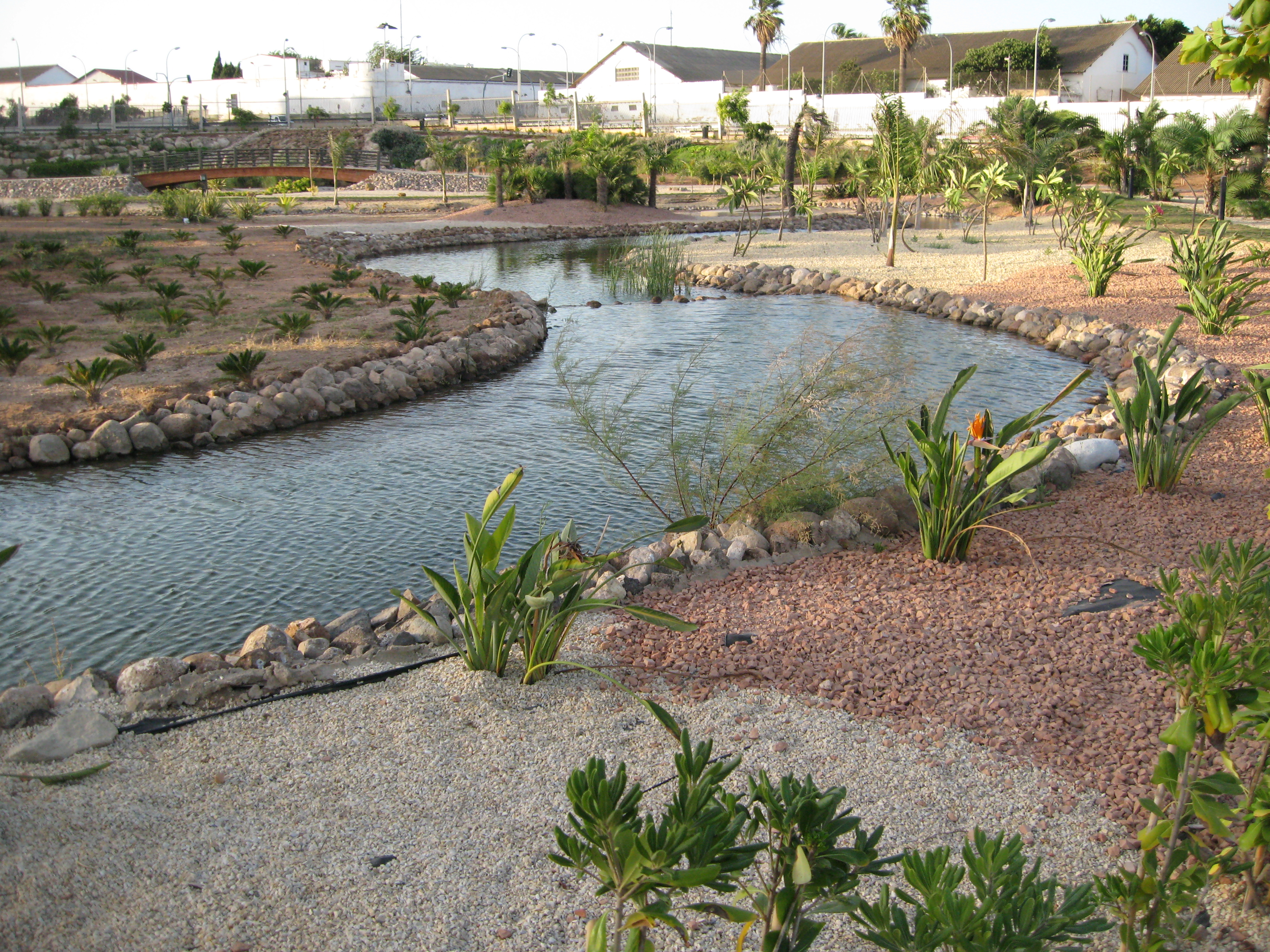

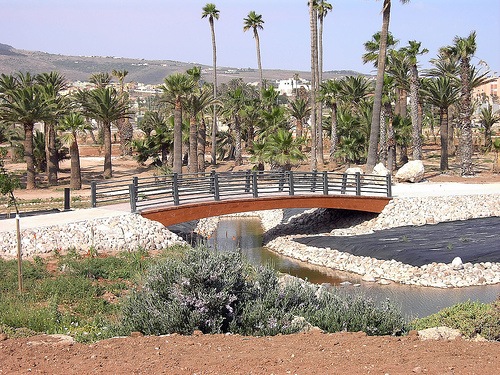

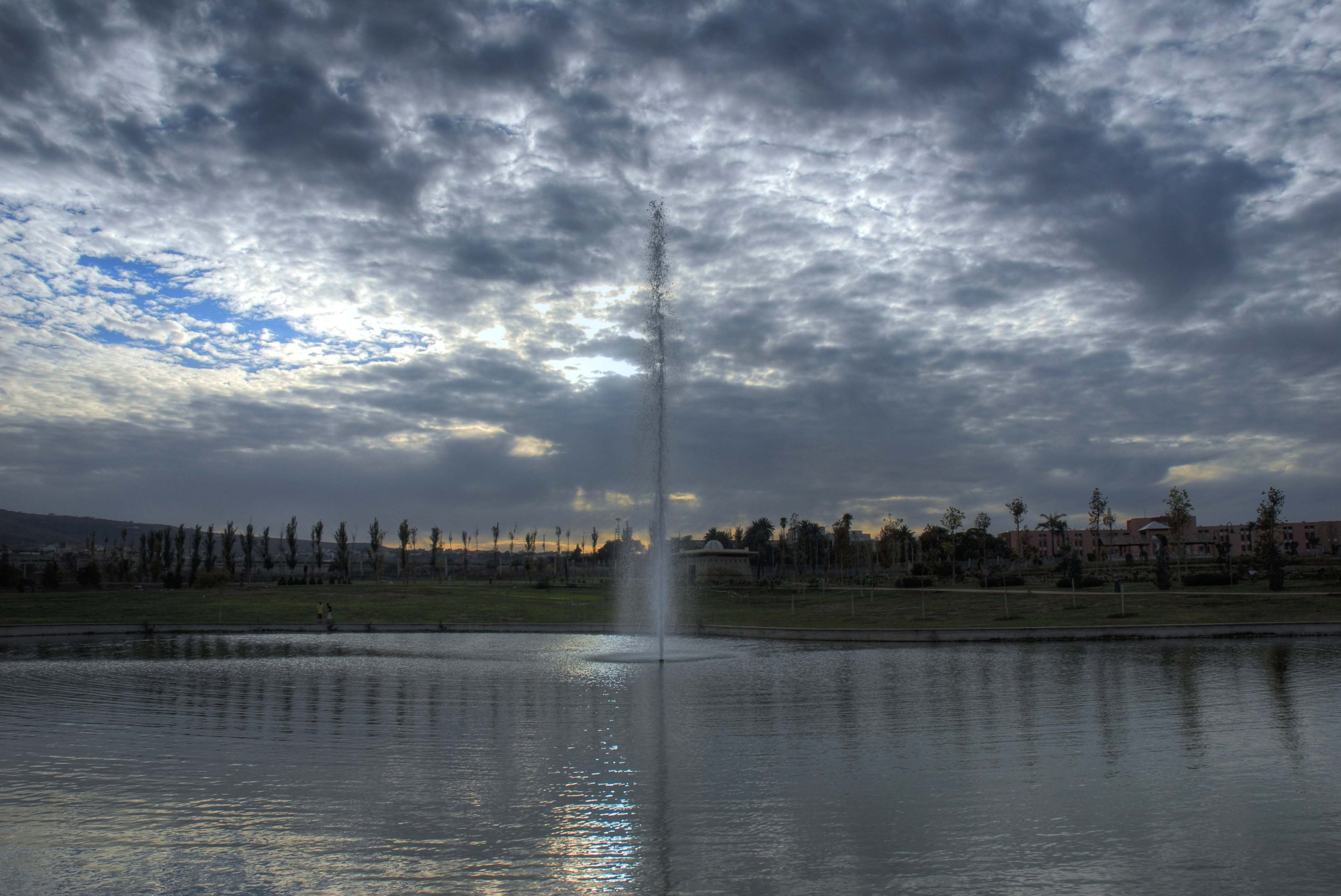

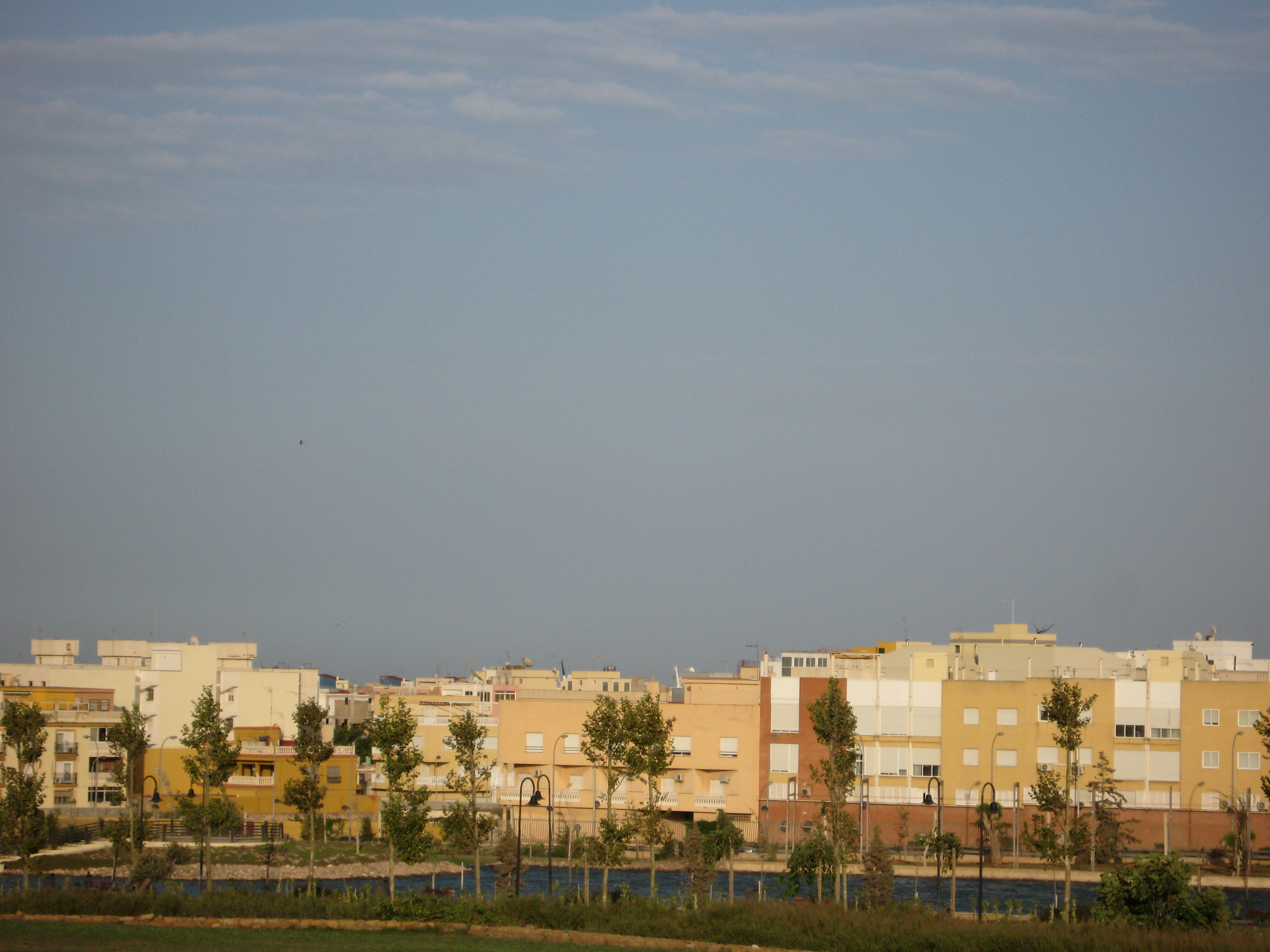

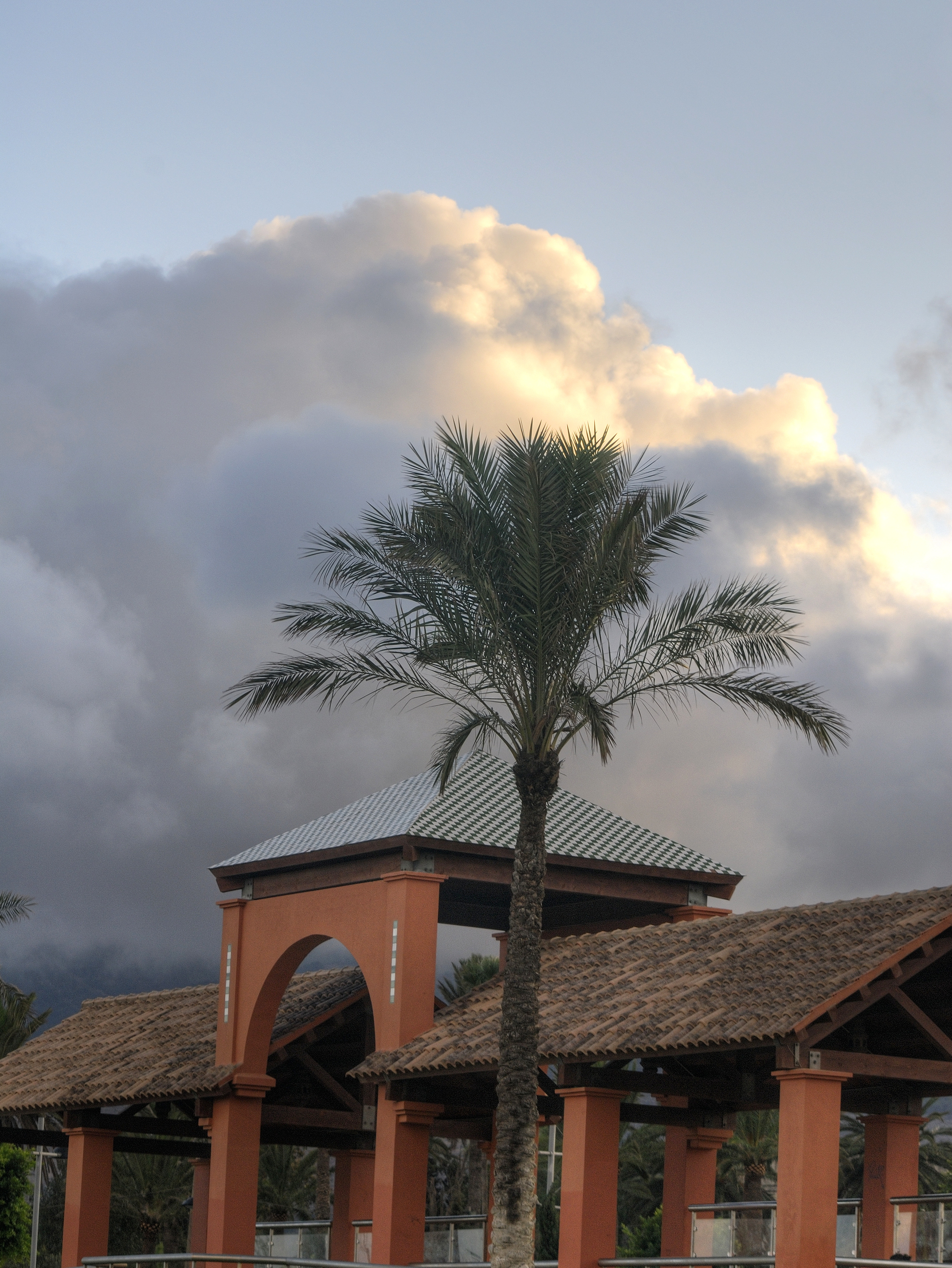

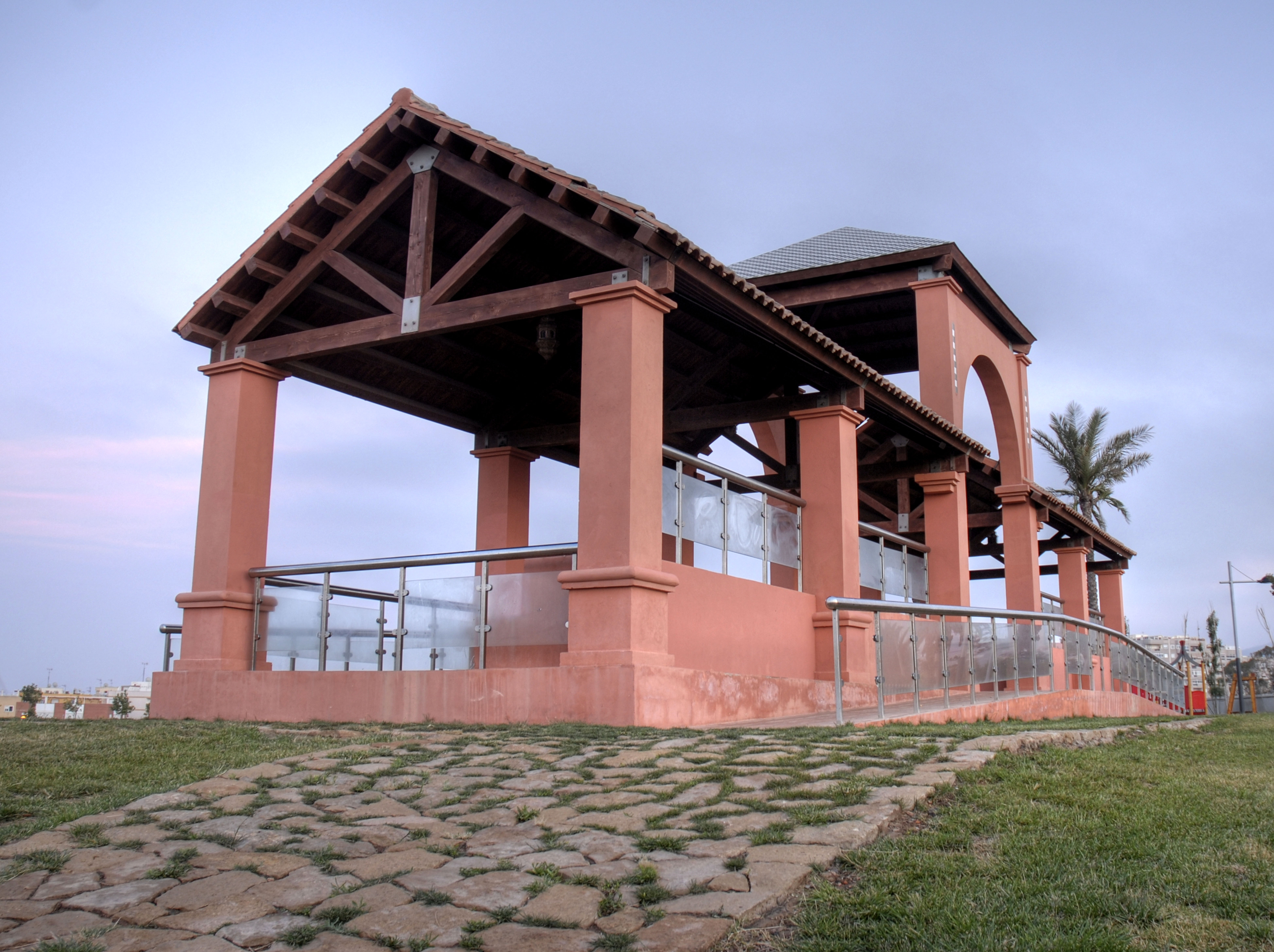

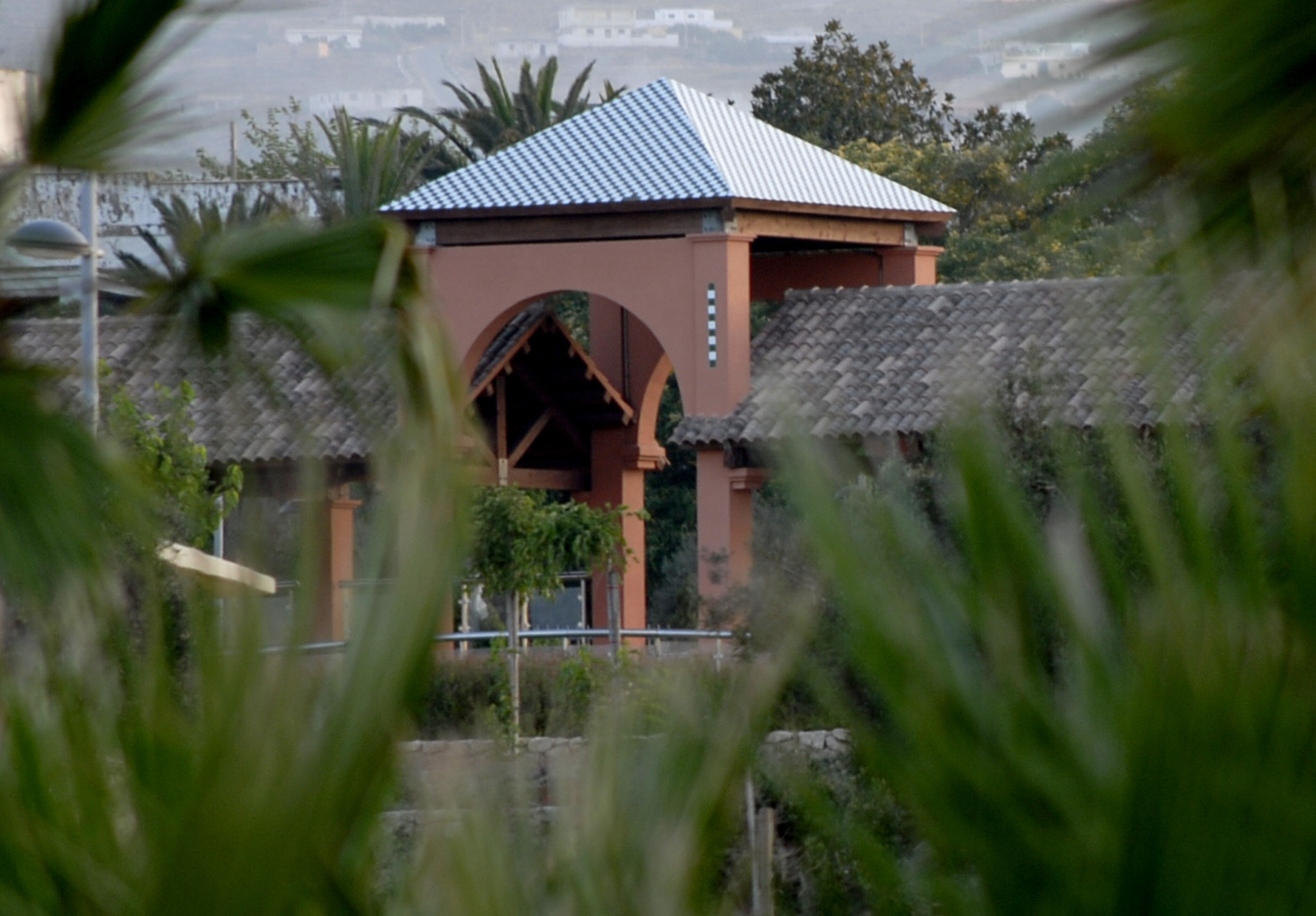

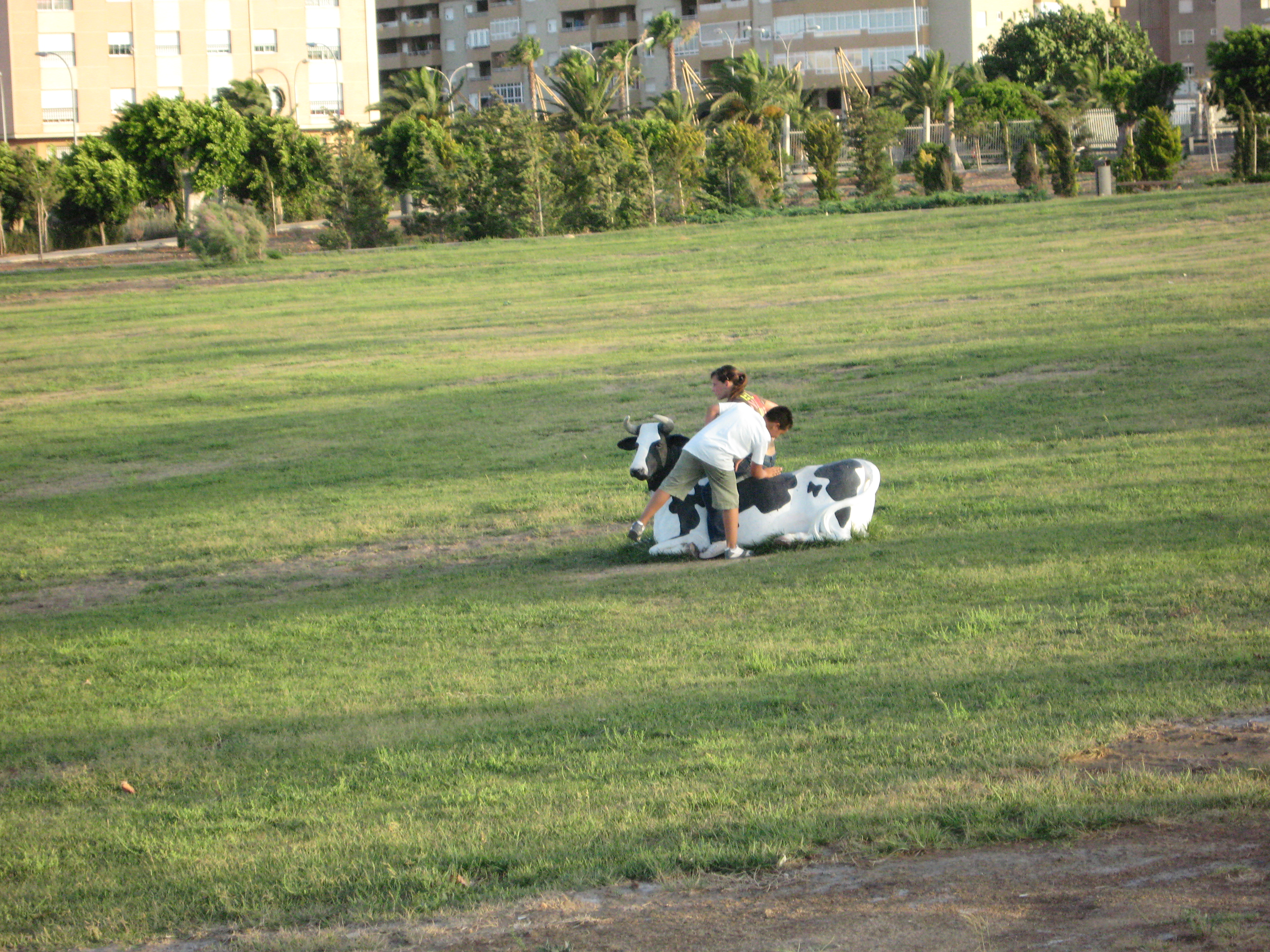

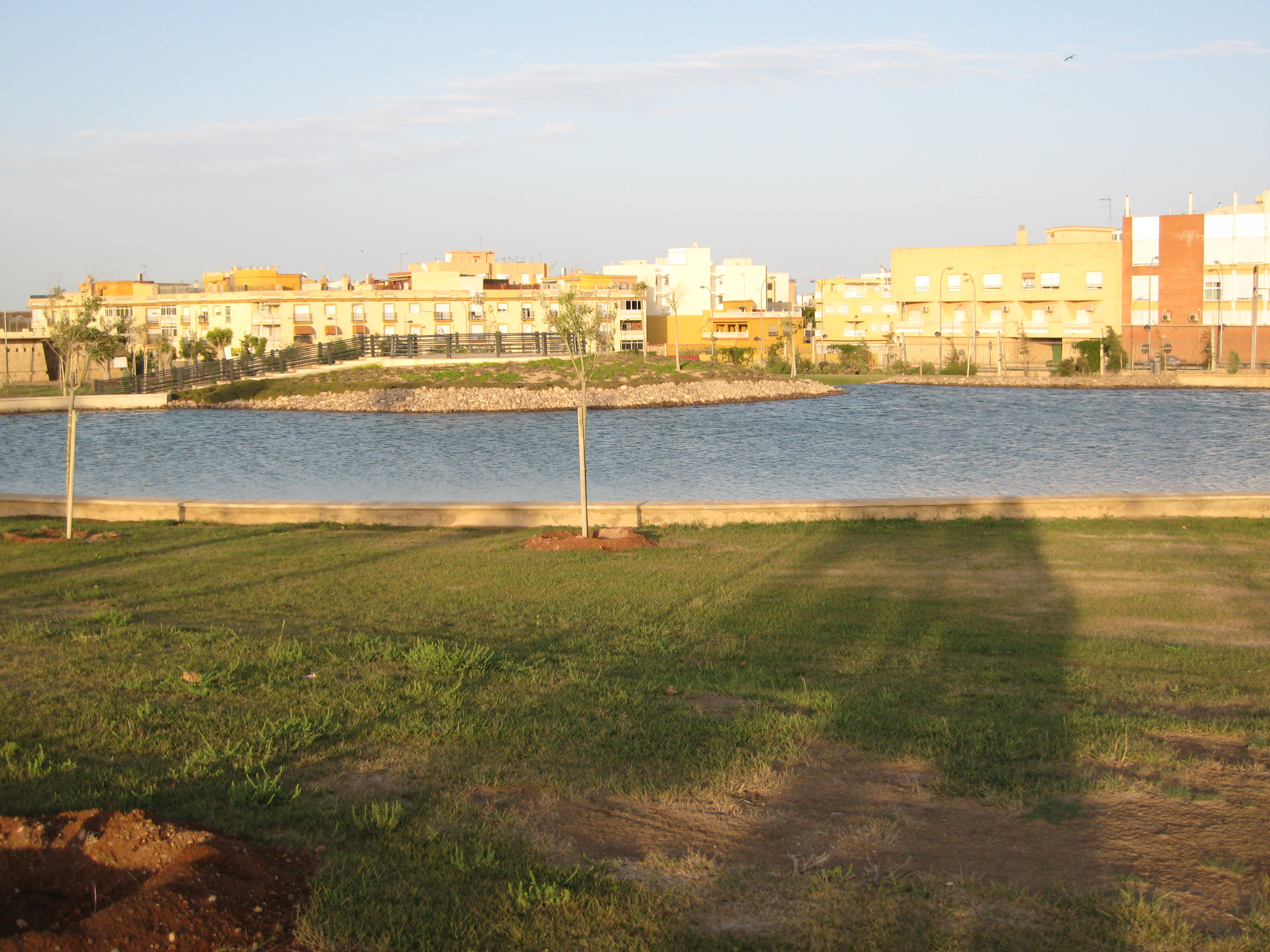

==== Agustin Jerez Park ====
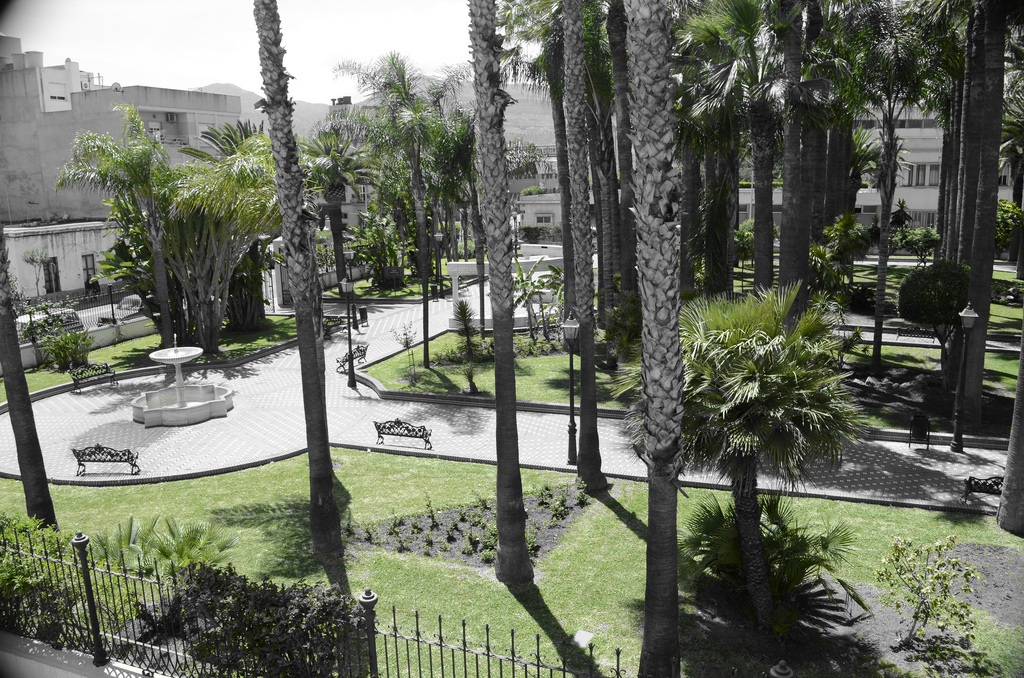
