= Hernandez Park =

Park in Melilla, Spain

Henandez Park
- Parque Henández
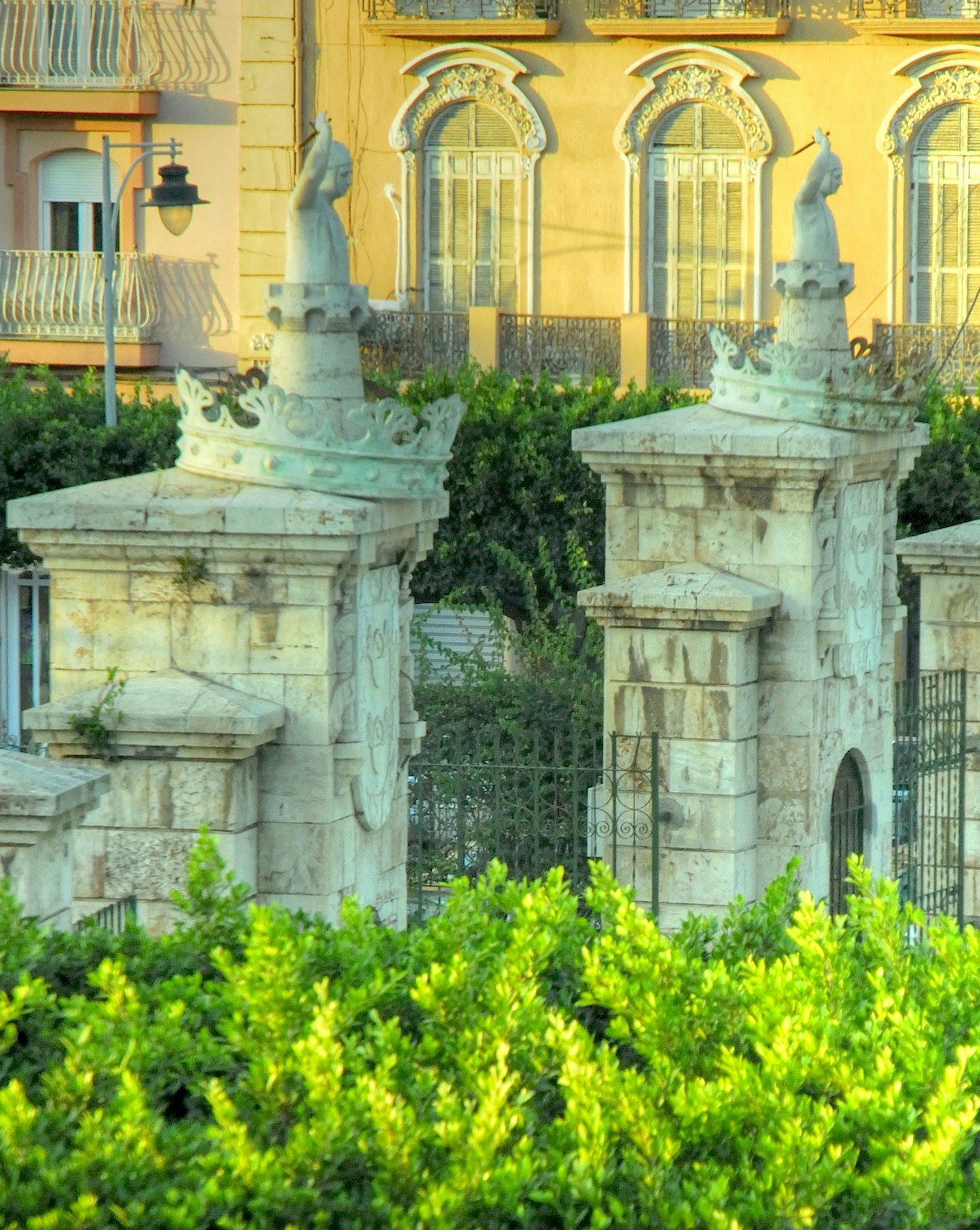

- Location within Spain
- Type: Park and Sculpture garden
- Location: Melilla, Spain
- Coordinates: 35°17′31″N 02°56′27″W
- Area: 42 hectares (100 acres)
- Opened: November 7, 1902; 123 years ago
- Manager: Department of Environment and Nature of the Autonomous City of Melilla
- Water: Yes
- Vegetation: Yes
- Designation: Jardín histórico and Bien de Interés Cultural
- Parking: Yes

Spanish Cultural Heritage
- Type: Non-movable
- Criteria: Jardín histórico and Bien de Interés Cultural
- Designated: 11 August 2007

Hernández Park is a historic garden located in the center of the autonomous city of Melilla, Spain, and is situated in the Modernist Expansion District on Plaza de España. This public space, which covers a considerable area, is considered one of the green lungs of the city and stands out for its architectural, landscape, historical, and cultural value.

== History ==
The origin of Hernández Park dates back to the late 19th century, when the land it now occupies was a reclaimed area next to the bed of the former Río de Oro. In 1900, the military commander of the garrison, Venancio Hernández Fernández, promoted the project to transform this space into a public garden. The initiative aimed to improve the quality of life for Melilla's inhabitants and beautify the city with a landscaped space.

The park's construction began in the early 20th century under the direction of military engineer Vicente García del Campo. The official inauguration took place on May 18, 1902. During its early years, the park continuously expanded, incorporating architectural and ornamental elements.

In addition to being a place for leisure and walking, the park served for decades as the main venue for the Melilla fair. The fair was held in the park from the 1910s until 2007. In 2008, it was moved to the Plaza de San Lorenzo due to the wear suffered by the landscaped area and the need for a larger, more suitable venue for celebrations.

The park has undergone several restorations, most notably the comprehensive rehabilitation completed after the fair’s relocation, which concluded in 2010.

== Etymology ==
The park is named in honor of General Venancio Hernández Fernández, a key figure in Melilla’s transformation into a modern urban space during his term. His efforts were instrumental in the creation of the park and other urban development initiatives of the time.

== Legislative Framework ==
The creation and conservation of Hernández Park are governed by municipal regulations that protect historic gardens and public spaces. The 2010 restoration was carried out under the framework of Spanish cultural heritage legislation, and the park has been recognized as a historic garden for its architectural and landscape value.

== Architecture ==
Hernández Park in Melilla is a prominent example of early 20th-century landscape and monumental architecture in North Africa. Its design and development were influenced by the urban vision of General Commander Venancio Hernández Fernández and military engineer Vicente García del Campo, who conceived the park as a recreational and beautification space for the city.

=== Main Entrance ===
The main entrance of the park was designed in 1914 by military engineer José de la Gándara. This monumental gateway, built in ashlar stone, features two towers crowned with ducal crowns. Atop each tower stands a sculpture of Guzmán el Bueno, depicted in the act of throwing the dagger with which he sacrificed his son during the defense of Tarifa. Below these statues are heraldic elements featuring the coat of arms of the city. The original coats of arms were destroyed during the Second Spanish Republic and later reconstructed in 1951 by sculptor Emilio Manescau.

=== Music Pavilion ===
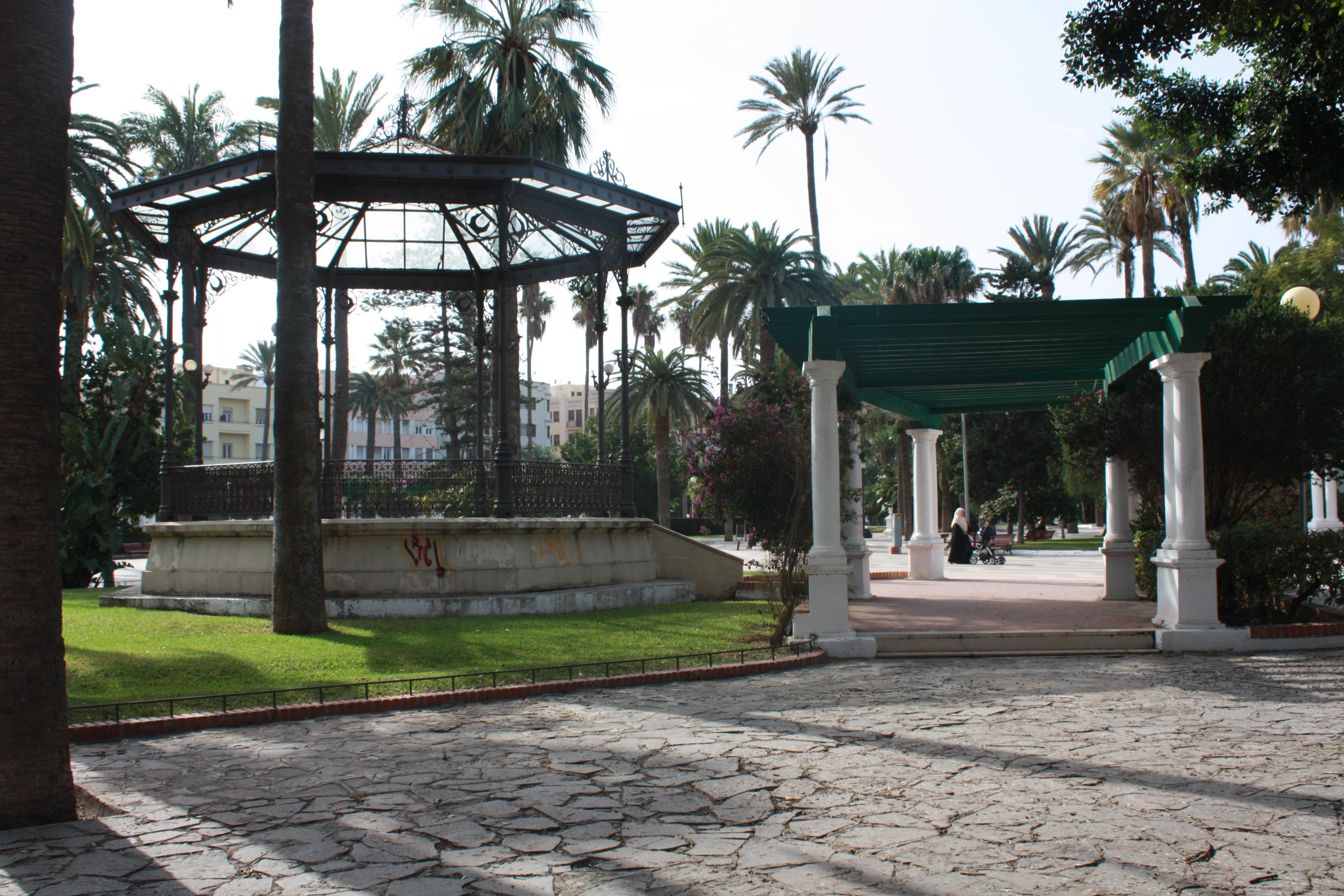
Music Pavilion

In 1907, a music pavilion was built at the center of the park, designed to host open-air concerts and cultural activities. Over the years, this space has witnessed numerous musical evenings and community events.

=== Perimeter Fence ===
The park's perimeter fence was completed in 1918, with the installation of a wrought iron enclosure that defines the space and protects it from the surrounding urban environment. Between 1927 and 1930, artistic pergolas were added at the lateral roundabouts along the main north-south walkway, adding a distinctive character to the park. These structures, along with improvements to walkways and gardens, contributed to the park’s consolidation as a place of leisure and social gathering for Melilla's residents.

=== Benches and Street Lamps ===
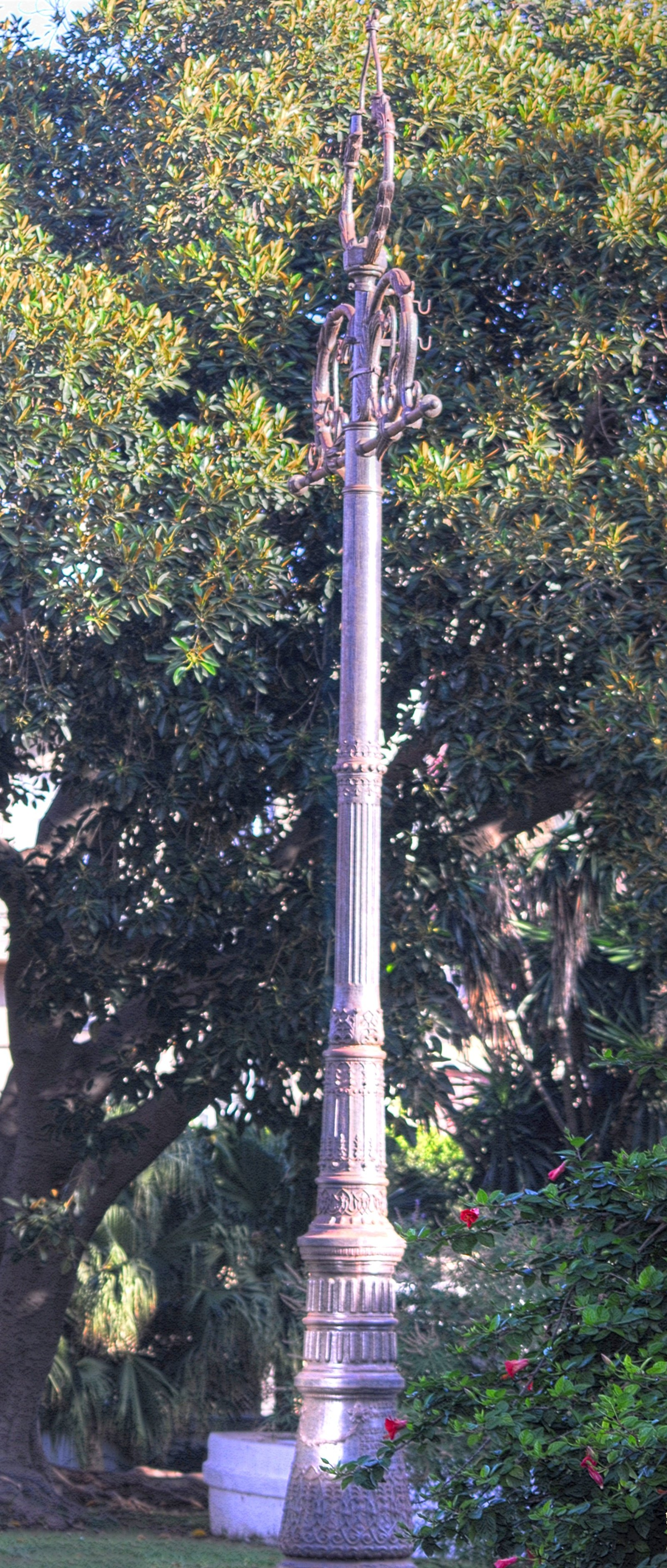
Street lamp

The park is equipped with numerous benches and street lamps that offer comfort and ambiance to visitors. The benches, made from traditional materials such as stone and wood, allow users to enjoy the natural surroundings and the various activities held in the park. The street lamps play an essential role not only in terms of functionality but also aesthetically, as they illuminate the park’s paths and walkways at night.

=== Pavements ===
Over the years, the park has undergone various transformations in its paving. Initially, the ground was compacted earth, later replaced with flagstones from Mount Gurugú. In the 1970s, artificial stone mosaics featuring motifs such as zodiac signs were introduced. During the 1980s, terrazzo in shades of white, black, and red was installed along the central promenade. Today, the park features a wavy pavement design in white, green, and red tones, which harmonizes with the park’s modernist surroundings.

== Landscaping ==
Hernández Park is an example of urban landscaping that blends Mediterranean vegetation with architectural design. Inside the park, visitors can find various gardens, paths, and fountains that make this space ideal for leisure.

=== Fountains ===
Hernández Park houses a series of fountains that not only beautify the surroundings but also hold historical and artistic significance. During the recent restoration efforts, several fountains were recovered and rehabilitated, some dating back to the early 20th century, while others are of more recent creation.

==== Linear Fountain ====
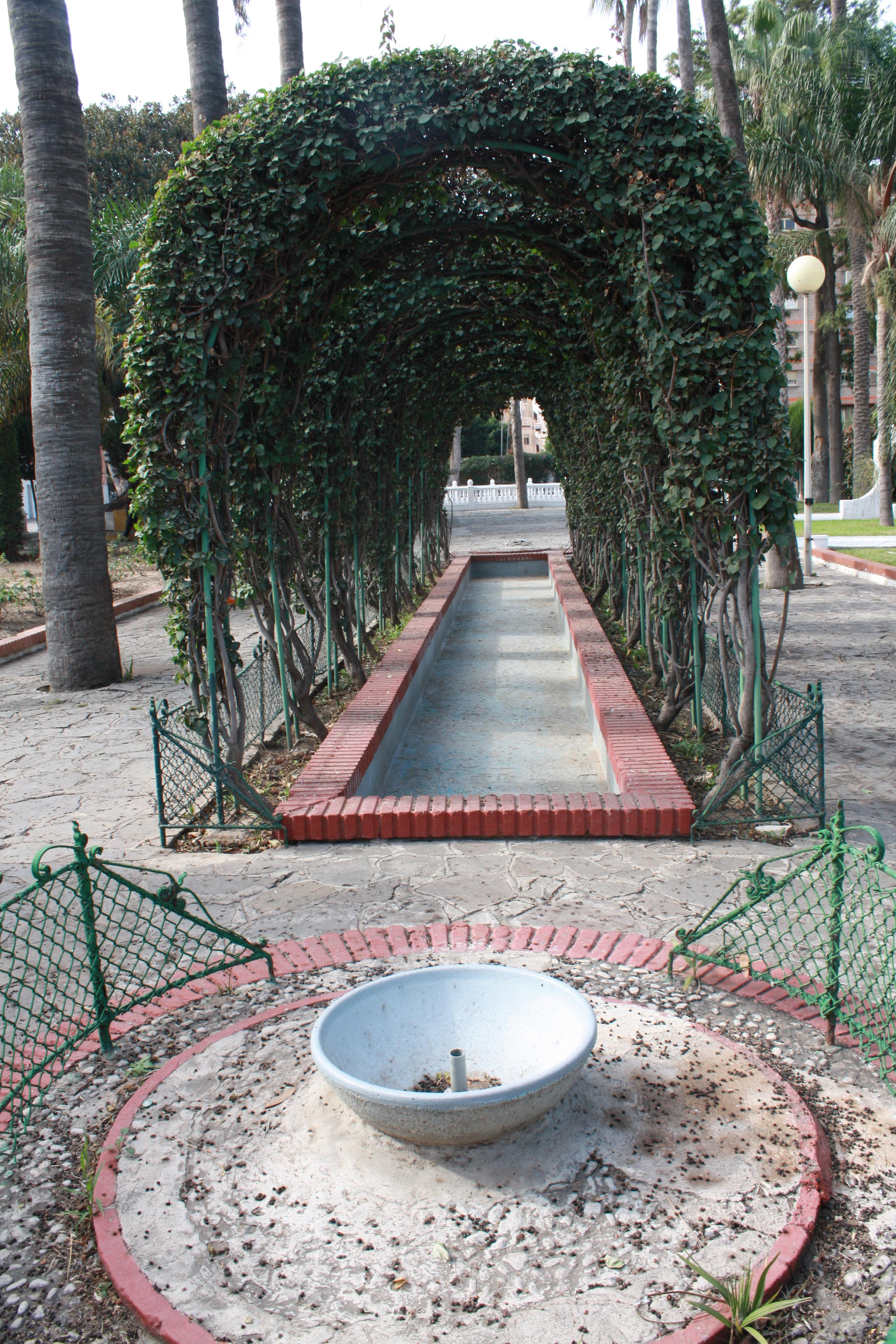
Linear Fountain

Located in the southwest sector of the park, the Linear Fountain is one of its most iconic features. Its modern and stylized design makes it a visual landmark within the park. Restoration efforts have revived its original functionality, incorporating contemporary technology to improve efficiency and sustainability.

==== Calla Lily Fountain ====
Also located in the southwest sector, this fountain stands out for its design inspired by the ornamental calla lily flower. The restoration preserved its original aesthetics while enhancing its visual appeal and ensuring it harmonizes with the park's natural setting.

==== Shell Fountain ====
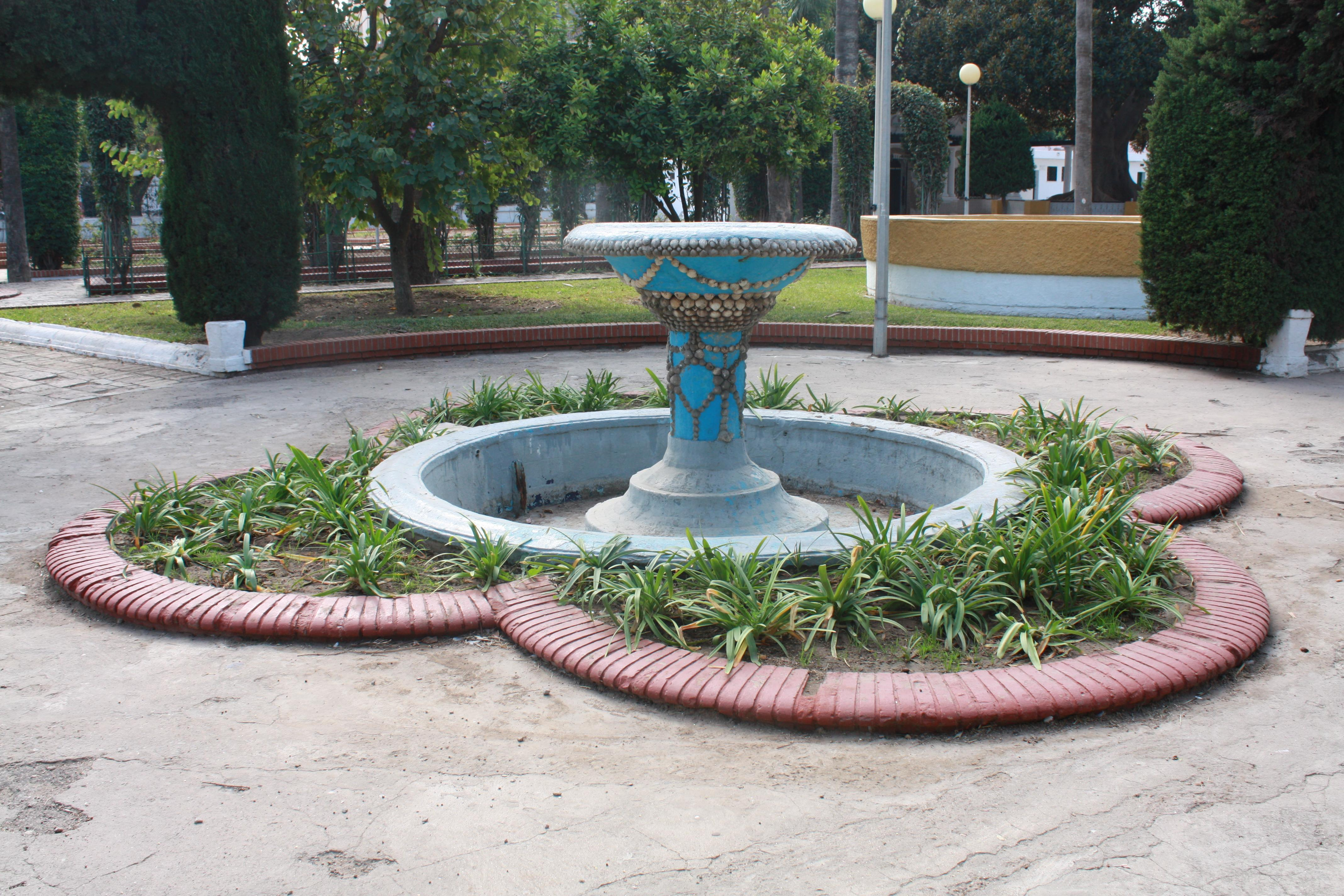
Shell Fountain

The Shell Fountain is another architectural gem of the park, recognized for its design incorporating marine elements such as shells and sea snails. It has been carefully restored to preserve its decorative style and ornamental function.

==== Foam Column Fountain ====
Located in the same sector as the previous fountains, the Foam Column Fountain is known for its vertical structure resembling a column of water. Restoration has recovered its original appearance, ensuring harmonious integration with the surrounding landscape.

==== Musical and Cybernetic Fountains ====
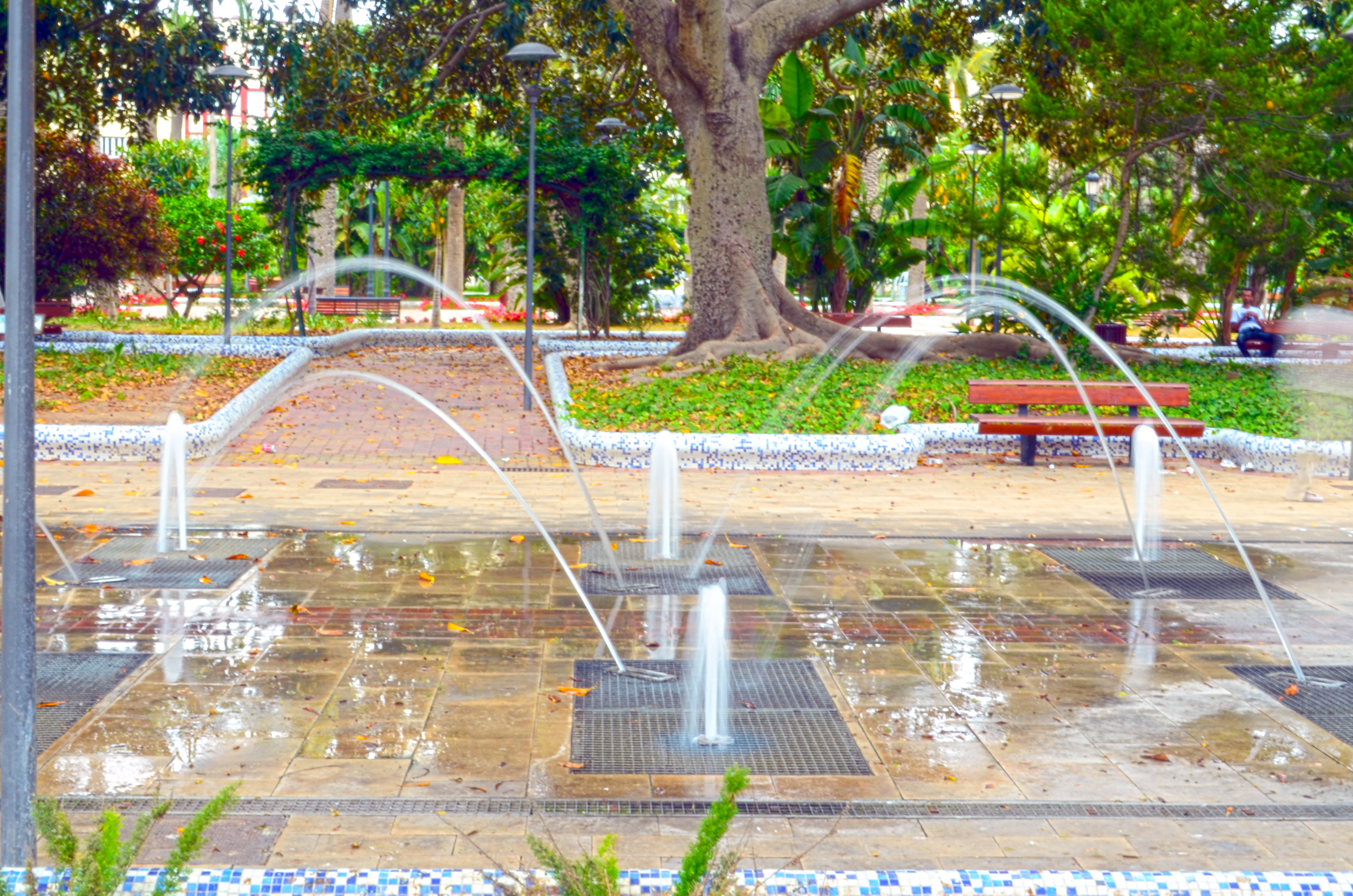
Interactive Fountain

In addition to the historical fountains, the park also features modern fountains equipped with advanced technology:

- Rotunda Fountain: A musical cybernetic fountain that combines water and light with electronically synchronized music.
- Interactive Fountain: Composed of dynamic water jets that allow public interaction, creating a water tunnel and offering a unique sensory experience.

These fountains not only enhance the park's aesthetic appeal but also provide a recreational space for visitors, integrating art, technology, and nature within an urban environment.

The restoration and maintenance of these fountains reflect Melilla's commitment to preserving its historical heritage and improving its public spaces, offering both residents and visitors a place where history and modernity coexist in harmony.

=== Gardens and Walkways ===
==== Main Gardens ====
===== Oval Garden =====
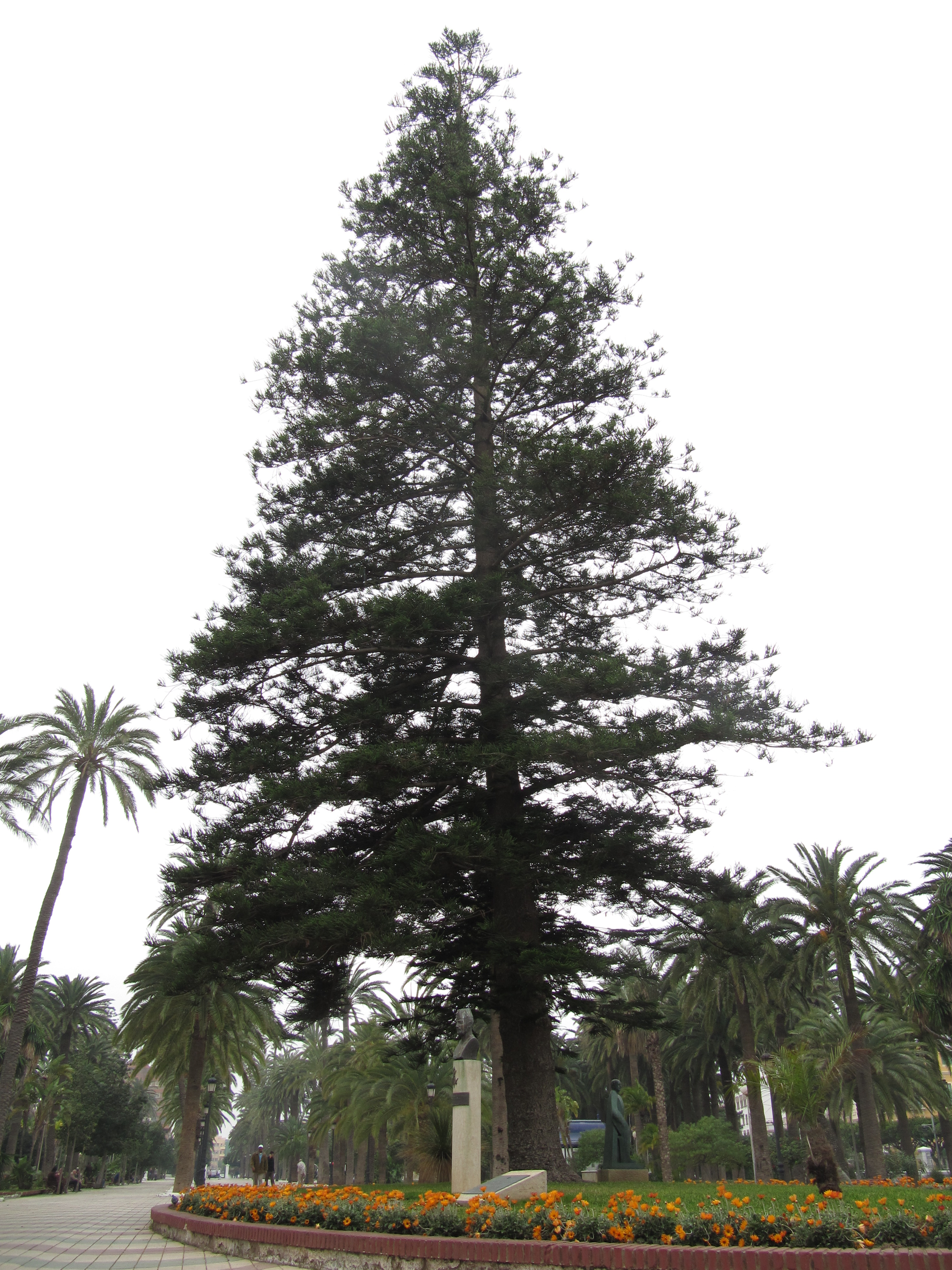
Oval Garden

Located at the eastern end of the park, it stands out for its curvilinear design, which contrasts with the linearity of the central promenade. Its most distinctive element is a large Norfolk Island pine (Araucaria heterophylla), which serves as a botanical landmark within the space.

===== Palm Garden =====
The central axis of the park is dominated by two parallel rows of palm trees (Phoenix canariensis, Phoenix dactylifera, and Washingtonia spp.) running from north to south. This layout visually recalls the gardens of the Alhambra's Generalife and conveys a sense of tropical grandeur.

==== Notable Walkways ====
===== Central Promenade =====
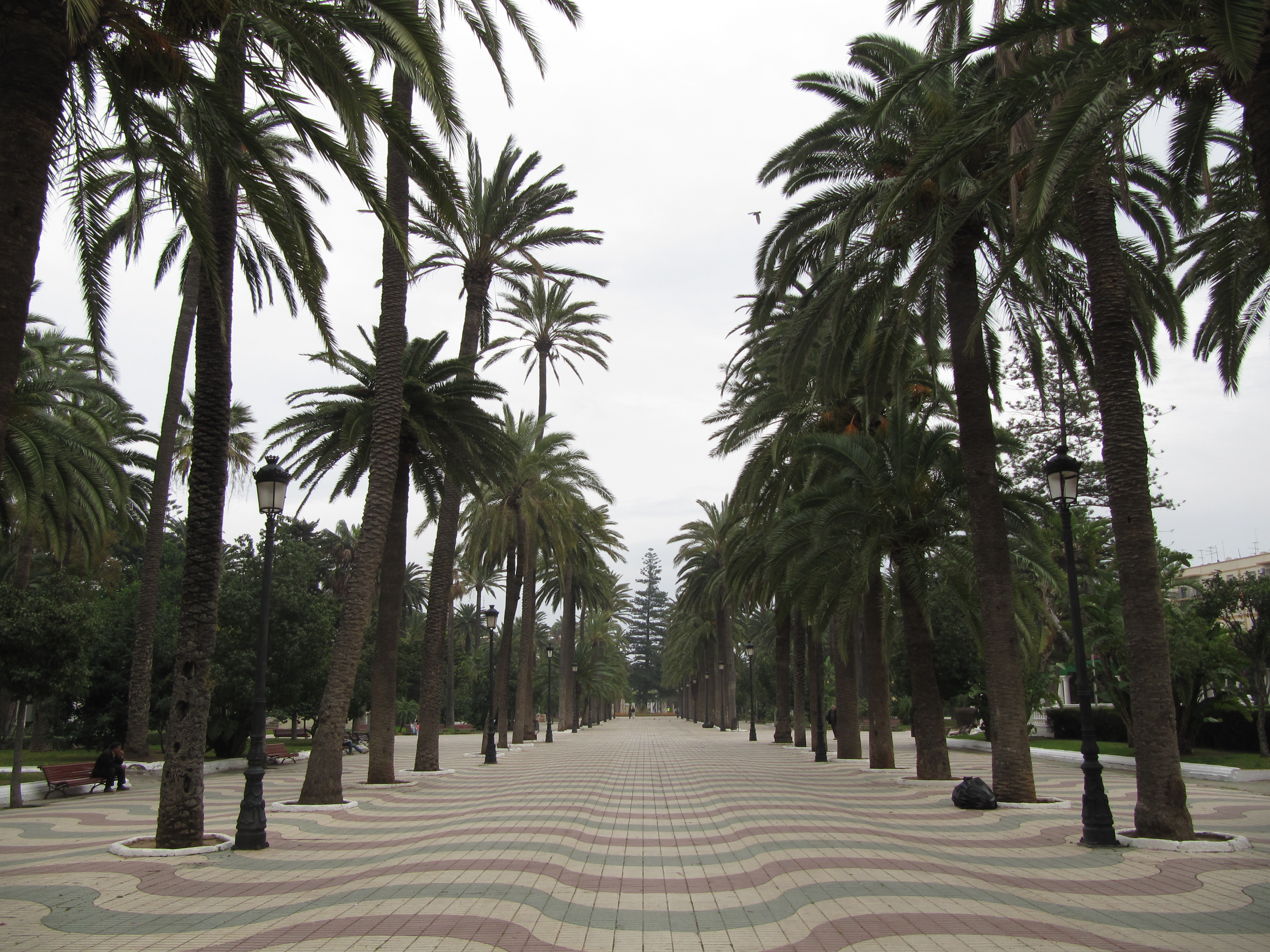
Central Promenade

This is the main spine of the park, flanked by side gardens, pergolas, fountains, and sculptures. It is often used for public events and recreational walking.

===== Lovers’ Walk =====
This walkway runs alongside the elongated pond reminiscent of the Generalife. It is popular for its romantic ambiance, enhanced by the double row of palm trees and the nearby “Foam Column” fountain.

===== Side Walkways =====
These narrower and winding paths connect different areas of the park, passing through sculptural ensembles, play areas, and rest zones. They are paved with materials that blend harmoniously with the surroundings.

== Sculpture ==
Hernández Park is also a significant cultural space due to its collection of sculptures and commemorative monuments honoring historical and cultural figures.

=== Commemorative Monuments ===
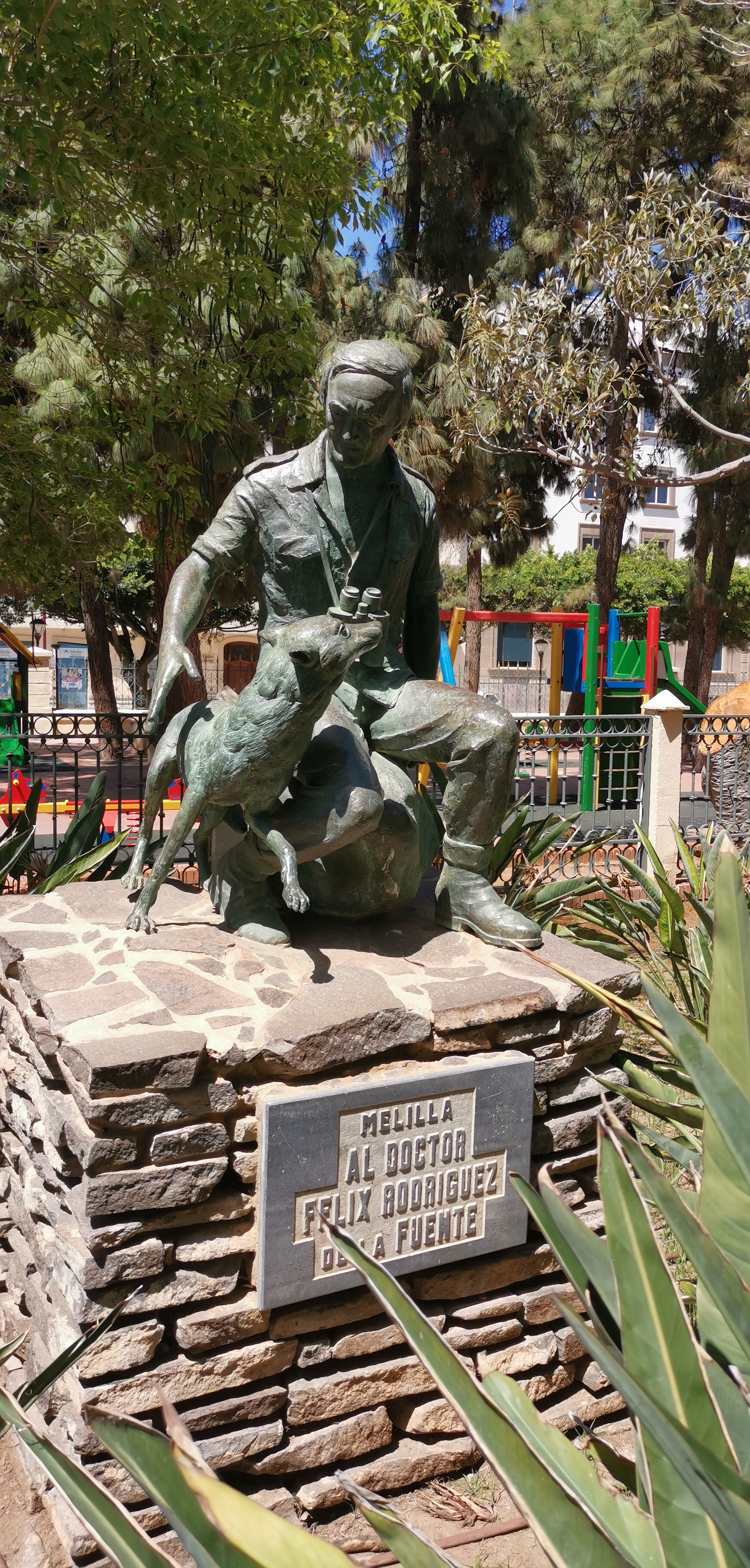

==== Tribute to Félix Rodríguez de la Fuente ====
Inaugurated in 1983 and created by sculptor Vicente Moreira, this statue honors Félix Rodríguez de la Fuente, a well-known Spanish naturalist and wildlife advocate, especially recognized for his work on the Iberian wolf.

==== Monument to the Spanish Legion ====
Located near one of the park’s side entrances, this monument honors the First Regiment “Gran Capitán” of the Spanish Legion for its humanitarian work in Melilla. It features a legionnaire holding a rifle and a flag.

==== Lamppost Honoring General Hernández ====
Built in 1907 through public subscription, this decorative lamppost stands along the central promenade and commemorates General Venancio Hernández Fernández.

==== Monument to Poet Miguel Fernández ====
Inaugurated in 1994, this monument by sculptor Mustafa Arruf honors Melilla-born poet Miguel Fernández, who won Spain’s National Literature Prize in 1977.

==== Monument to Lieutenant Francisco Jesús Aguilar ====
Sculpted by Mustafa Arruf and unveiled in 2001, this monument commemorates Legionnaire Lieutenant Francisco Jesús Aguilar Fernández, who died in 1993 during a humanitarian mission in Bosnia.

==== Monument to Lope de Vega ====
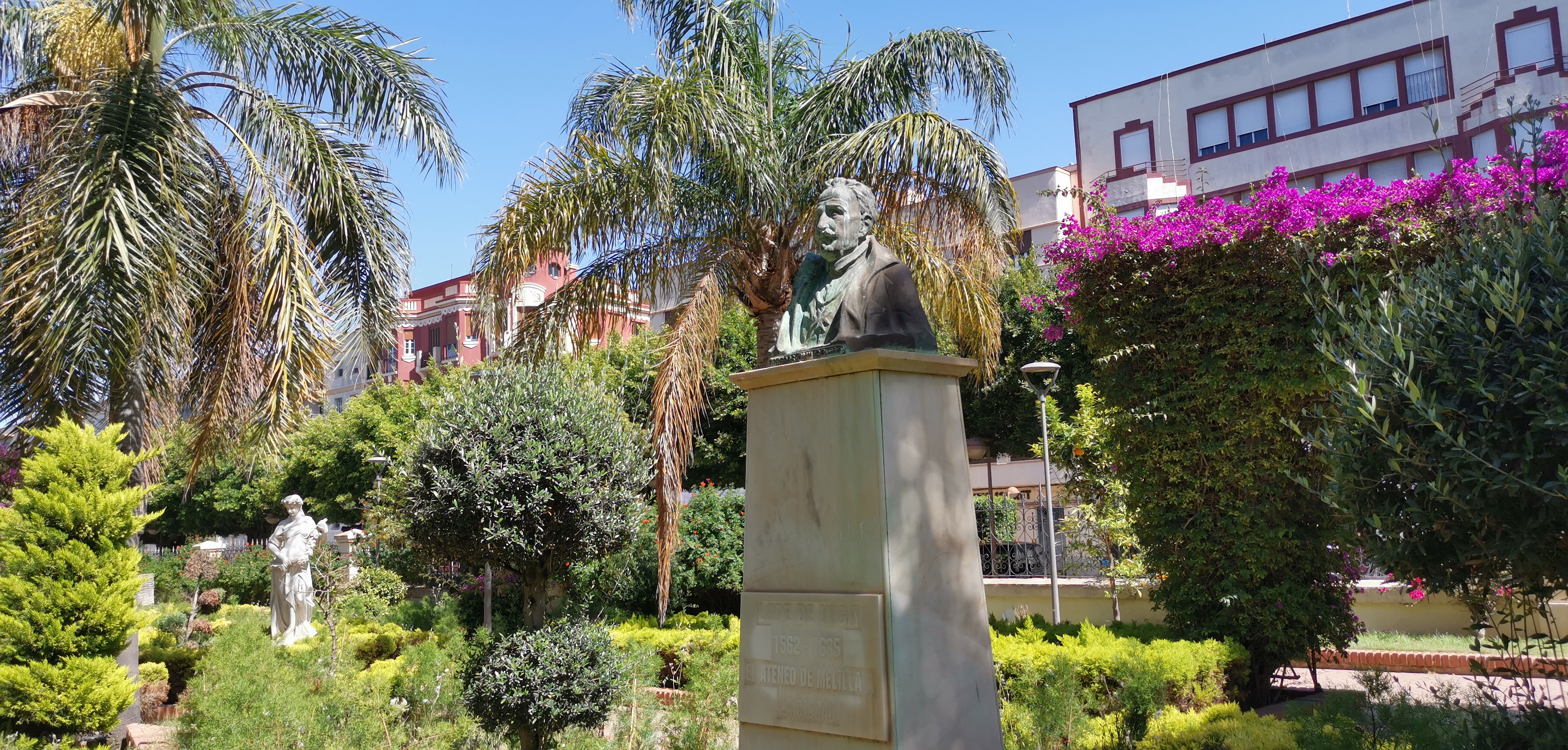
Monument to Lope de Vega

Inaugurated in 1935 by the Scientific and Literary Athenaeum of Melilla, this bronze bust honors playwright Lope de Vega. It has stood in the park since its dedication, though it was relocated in 1951.

=== Other Sculptural Groups ===
In addition to the commemorative monuments, the park features other sculptures and decorative elements:

- The Phoenix of the Engineers, symbolizing regeneration and the spirit of rebuilding, linked to Melilla’s military tradition.
- Busts and reliefs of literary figures and notable locals.

== Flora and Fauna ==
=== Flora ===
Hernández Park features a diverse and representative collection of ornamental and exotic flora, stemming from its original concept as an urban garden in the early 20th century. Since its establishment in 1902, numerous species have been planted to give the park a tropical appearance, in line with the style of major European gardens of the time.

==== Palms ====
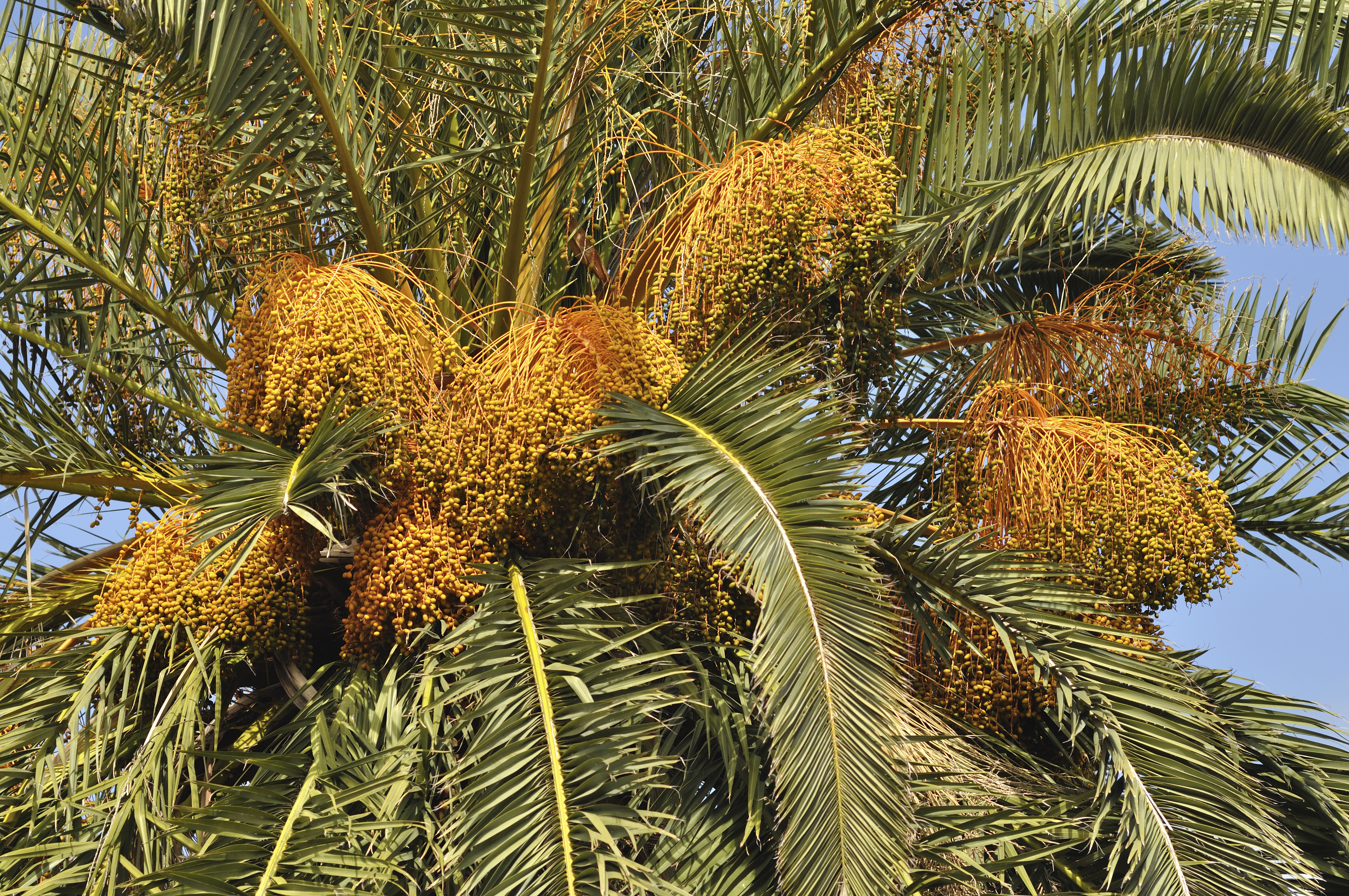
Canary Island date palm

One of the park’s most notable botanical features is its outstanding collection of palm trees, including species such as:

- Phoenix canariensis (Canary Island date palm)
- Phoenix dactylifera (date palm)
- Washingtonia filifera and Washingtonia robusta

These palms are aligned along both sides of the elongated pond reminiscent of the Generalife gardens in Granada, forming one of the most scenic and iconic landscaping elements of the park.

==== Notable Trees and Species ====
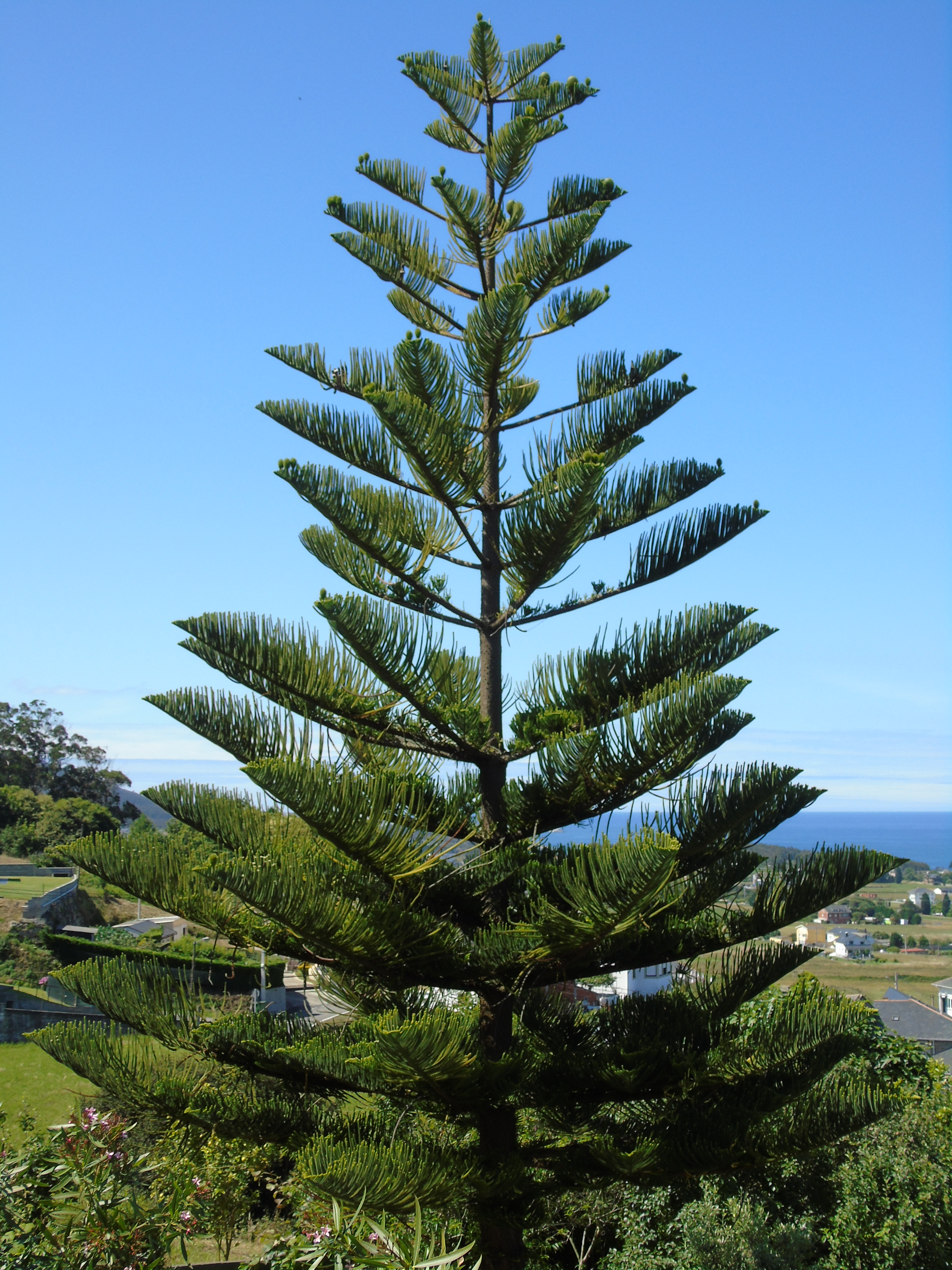
Araucaria

Among the most representative trees are:

- Araucaria (Araucaria heterophylla), located in the oval garden at the eastern end.
- Ficus (Ficus microcarpa and Ficus macrophylla), found in various parts of the park.
- Canary Island pine (Pinus canariensis), mainly used in the children's garden.
- Canary Island dragon tree (Dracaena draco), with three notable specimens. This species is valued for its longevity and distinctive reddish sap.
- Giant yucca (Yucca elephantipes), found along the pergolas of the transversal walkway.
- Sago palm (Cycas revoluta), a frequently used ornamental species.
- Bougainvillea (Bougainvillea spectabilis), commonly used to decorate pergolas, especially prominent in spring.

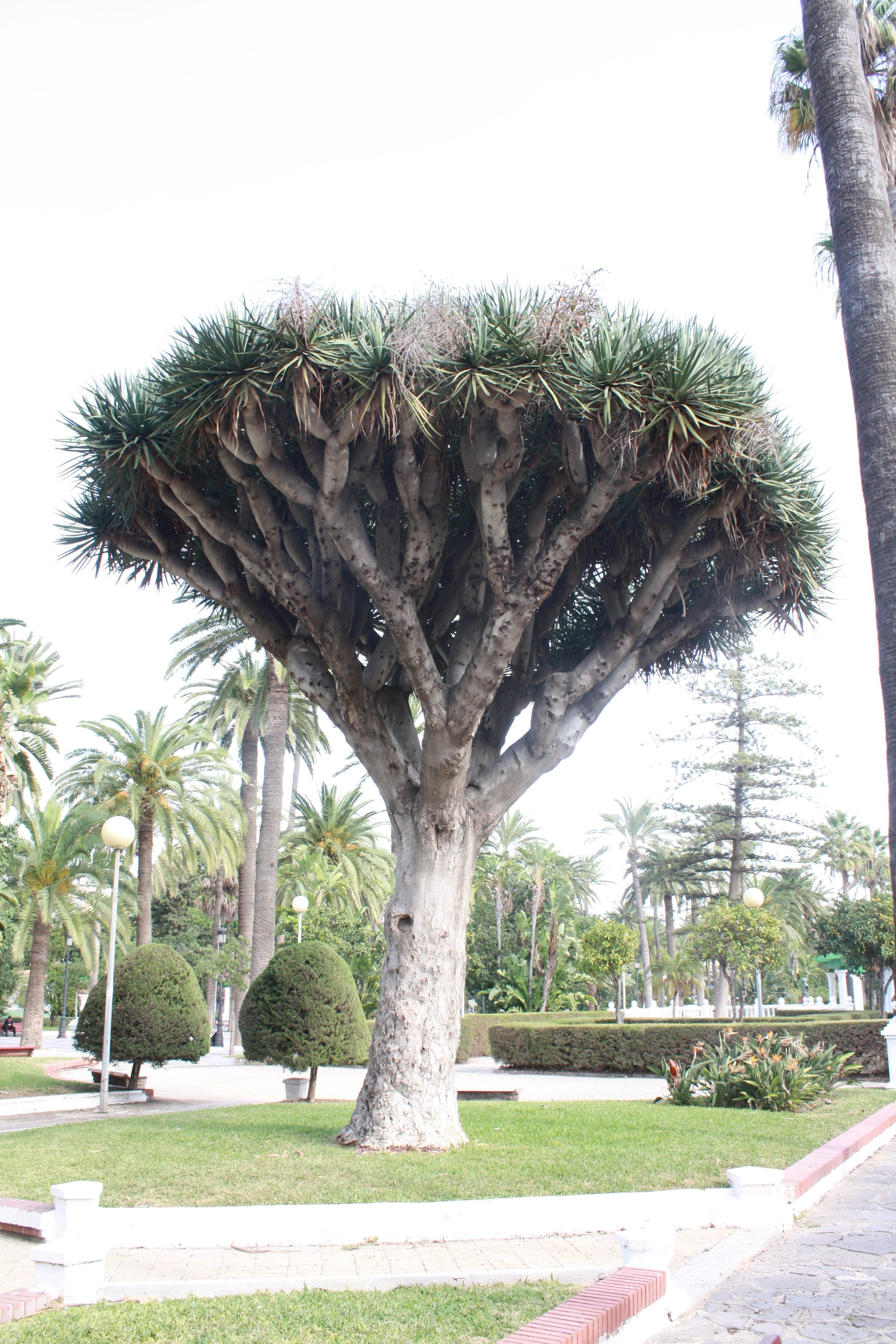
Canary Island dragon tree

The park’s vegetation is structured around gardens and walkways, complemented by ornamental features such as pergolas, sculptures, and fountains. Despite the passage of time and the loss of some original species, Hernández Park remains a botanical landmark in the city of Melilla.

=== Fauna ===
Hernández Park hosts a rich diversity of fauna, especially birds, small mammals, and reptiles. Its lush vegetation, fountains, and ponds create a welcoming habitat for various species.

==== Birds ====
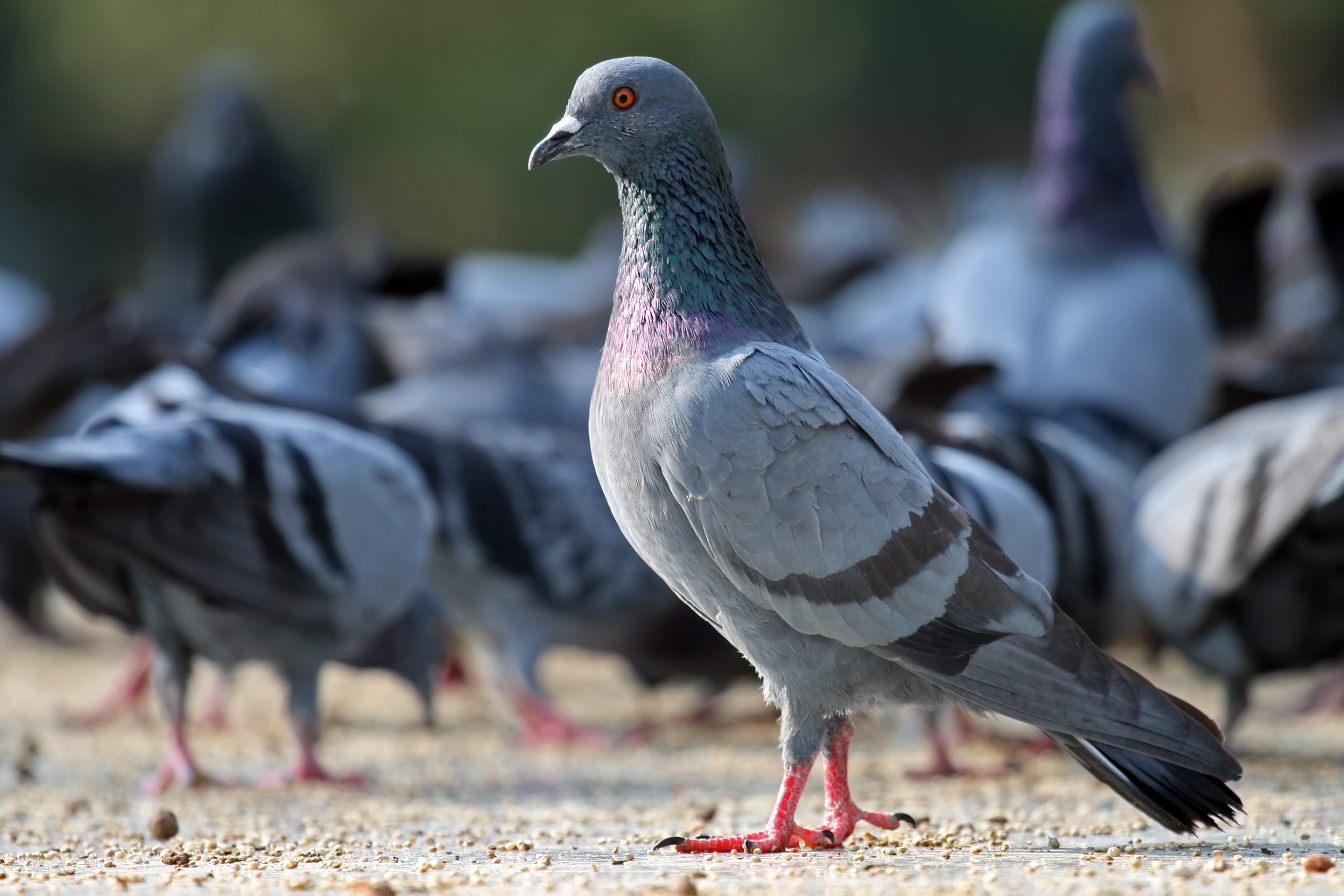
Pigeon

The park is a haven for numerous bird species, both resident and migratory. The variety of trees, shrubs, and water features provides food and shelter, making it an excellent spot for birdwatching. Commonly seen species include blackbirds, pigeons, doves, starlings, and goldfinches. During migration periods, the park also serves as a resting point for birds crossing the Strait of Gibraltar.

==== Reptiles ====
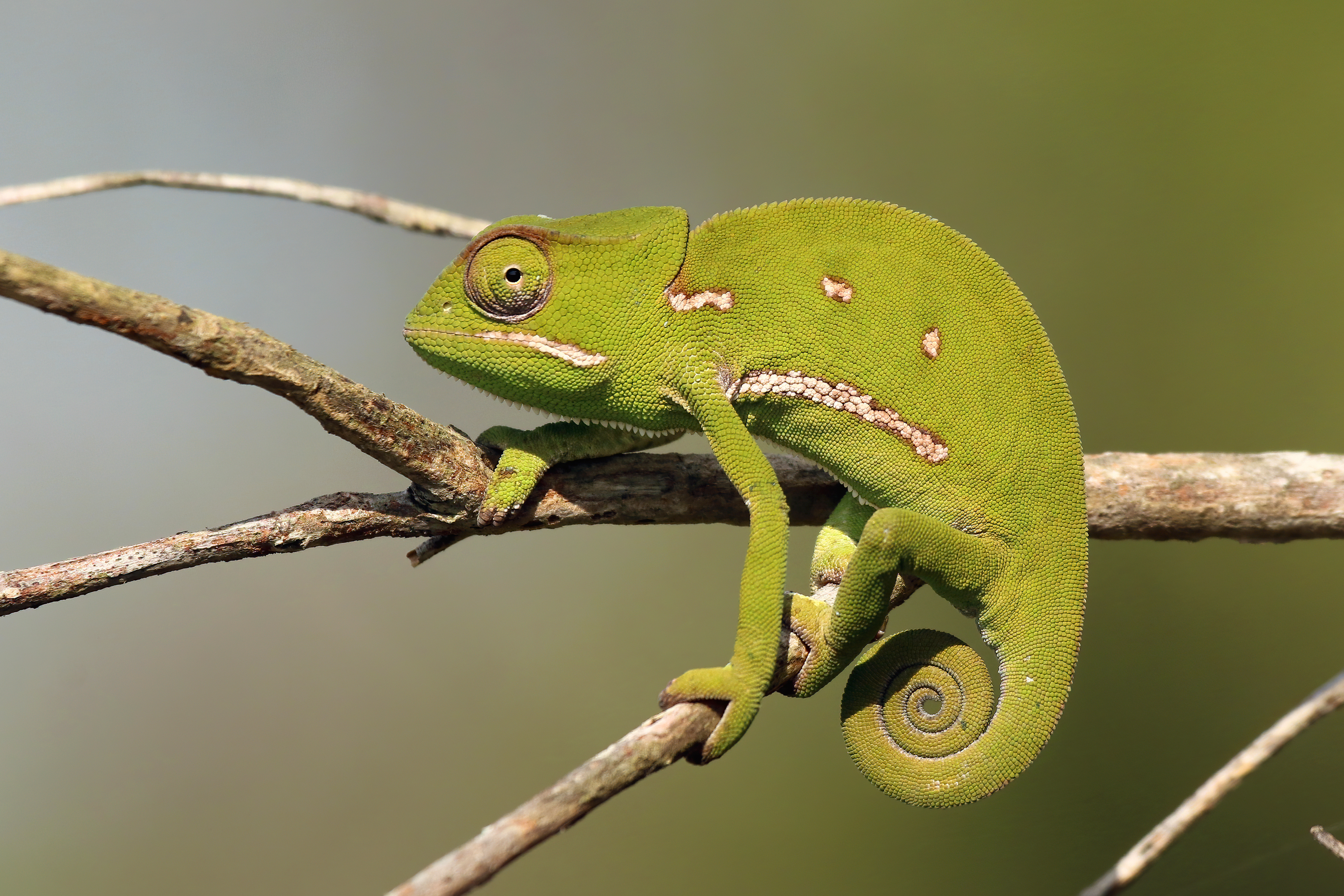
Chameleon

Several lizard species inhabit the park, such as the Moroccan skink (Chalcides viridanus) and the Andalusian wall lizard (Podarcis vaucheri). These reptiles benefit from the park’s warm, sunny microclimate. Common chameleons (Chamaeleo chamaeleon) can also be spotted, especially in dense vegetation and shrubbery.

==== Mammals ====
Though primarily a bird and reptile habitat, the park is also home to small mammals. European hedgehogs (Erinaceus europaeus) and North African hedgehogs (Atelerix algirus) can be found, helping control insect populations. In addition, bats live in the park, contributing to nighttime insect control.

== Culture and Sports ==
=== Cultural Activities ===
Throughout the year, the park hosts a wide range of cultural events, including music, dance, theater, and themed celebrations. In April 2025, an open-air dance performance was held featuring the company of Marina Remartínez and José Sabroso, along with the Ballet Colores and live music by Gonzalo Carmona, in celebration of International Dance Day.

In July 2021, the Melilla School of Flamenco organized a concert in collaboration with the Aspanies Plena Inclusión Center, featuring sevillanas, rumbas, and tangos performed by the center’s participants.

The park has also served as the venue for events such as the 20th edition of the North Africa Pride celebration in 2025, organized by Amlega, which included micro-theater, music, and raffles.

==== Educational Activities ====
The park also offers child-friendly educational activities. In March 2023, workshops on Amazigh culture were held in the park's Cyber Library, where children learned Amazigh calligraphy using recycled materials.

During the 2024–2025 holiday season, the park was transformed into a children's leisure center with ice skating, video games, and board games, organized by Novedades Melilla and Zona Centro.

==== Permanent Cultural Spaces ====
The park features several permanent artistic and cultural elements, such as the Music Pavilion and sculptures honoring figures like Lope de Vega, Félix Rodríguez de la Fuente, Miguel Fernández, and the Spanish Legion.

Additionally, the park’s Cyber Library serves as a youth resource center, offering internet access and hosting cultural workshops and activities.

=== Sports Activities ===
In addition to its botanical and cultural value, Hernández Park also offers various sports facilities and activities for the community.

==== San Silvestre Race ====
This traditional race is held every December 31st, starting from the park. In 2024, it gathered 620 runners in costume, solidifying its reputation as a festive and popular sporting event in the city.

==== Ice Skating Rink ====
During the 2024–2025 holiday season, an ice skating rink was installed in the park, becoming one of its main winter attractions and drawing large numbers of visitors.

=== Sports Facilities ===
==== Outdoor Fitness Area ====
This area features outdoor gym equipment, ideal for adults who want to exercise while their children play nearby. Although it is not located directly next to the children's playground, it is within walking distance and offers a suitable environment for physical activity.

== See also ==
- Plaza de España
- Lobera Park
