= Plaza de España (Melilla) =

Square in Melilla, Spain

- Plaza de España
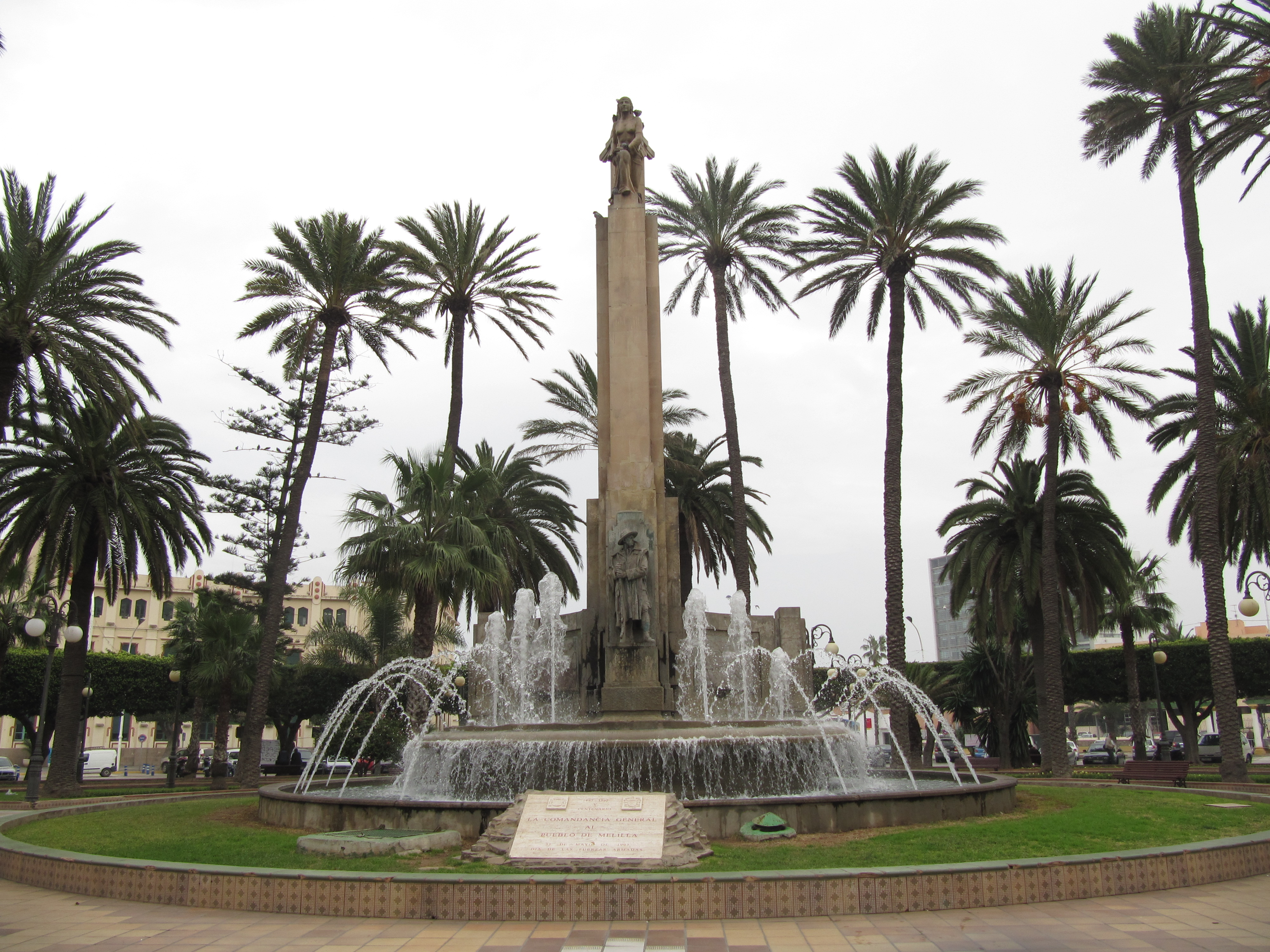

- Location within Spain
- Type: Park and Sculpture garden
- Location: Melilla, Spain
- Coordinates: 35°17′32″N 02°56′16″W
- Area: 116 hectares (290 acres)
- Opened: 1914
- Manager: Department of Environment and Nature of the Autonomous City of Melilla
- Water: Yes
- Vegetation: Yes
- Designation: Jardín histórico and Bien de Interés Cultural
- Parking: Yes

Spanish Cultural Heritage
- Type: Non-movable
- Criteria: Jardín histórico and Bien de Interés Cultural
- Designated: 11 August 2007

Plaza de España is the most important square in the autonomous Spanish city of Melilla. It is located in the Ensanche Modernista, between the old town (Melilla la Vieja) and the new urban centre (Barrio Reina Victoria).

== History ==
Planned as the Urbanization Project of the Puerta de Santa Bárbara in 1910 by José de la Gándara and approved in January 1911, Alfonso XIII began the demolition of the field walls, on April 11 the tower of Santa Bárbara was demolished and in June 1912 the Board of Arbitrations granted it the name of Plaza de España. The project was approved on January 18, 1913, by the president of the Board of Arbitrations General José Villalba Riquelme, and construction began on April 22 of the same year, a process that concluded on January 23, 1914, with the inauguration of the beautiful square by the same General Villalba. In 2007 its gardens obtained, together with the Hernandez Park, the title of Historic Garden.

== Description ==
The square consists of a roundabout with a radius of eighty metres. It has three rings of walkways and two interspersed gardens, with the Monument to the Heroes and Martyrs of the Campaigns located at its centre.

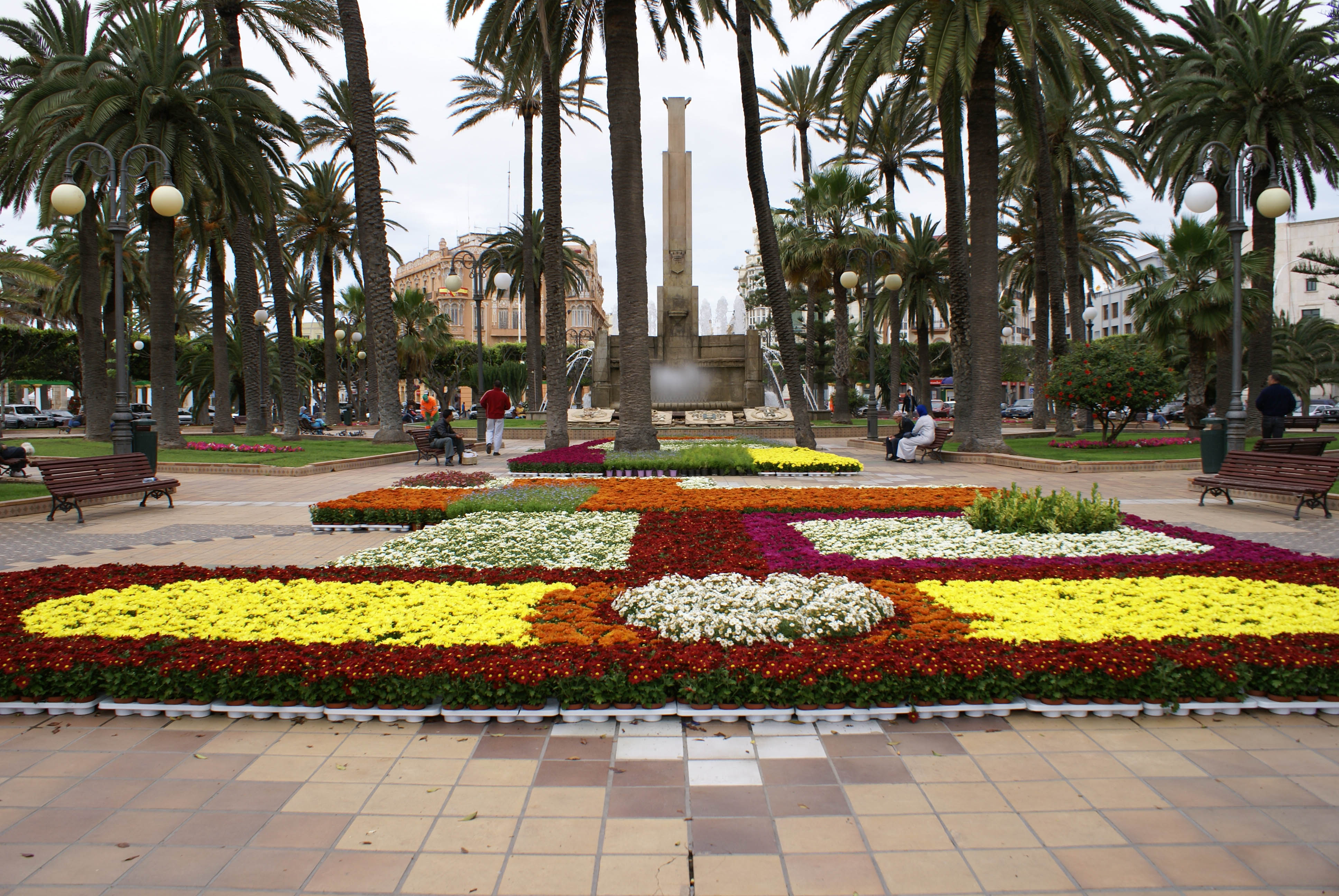

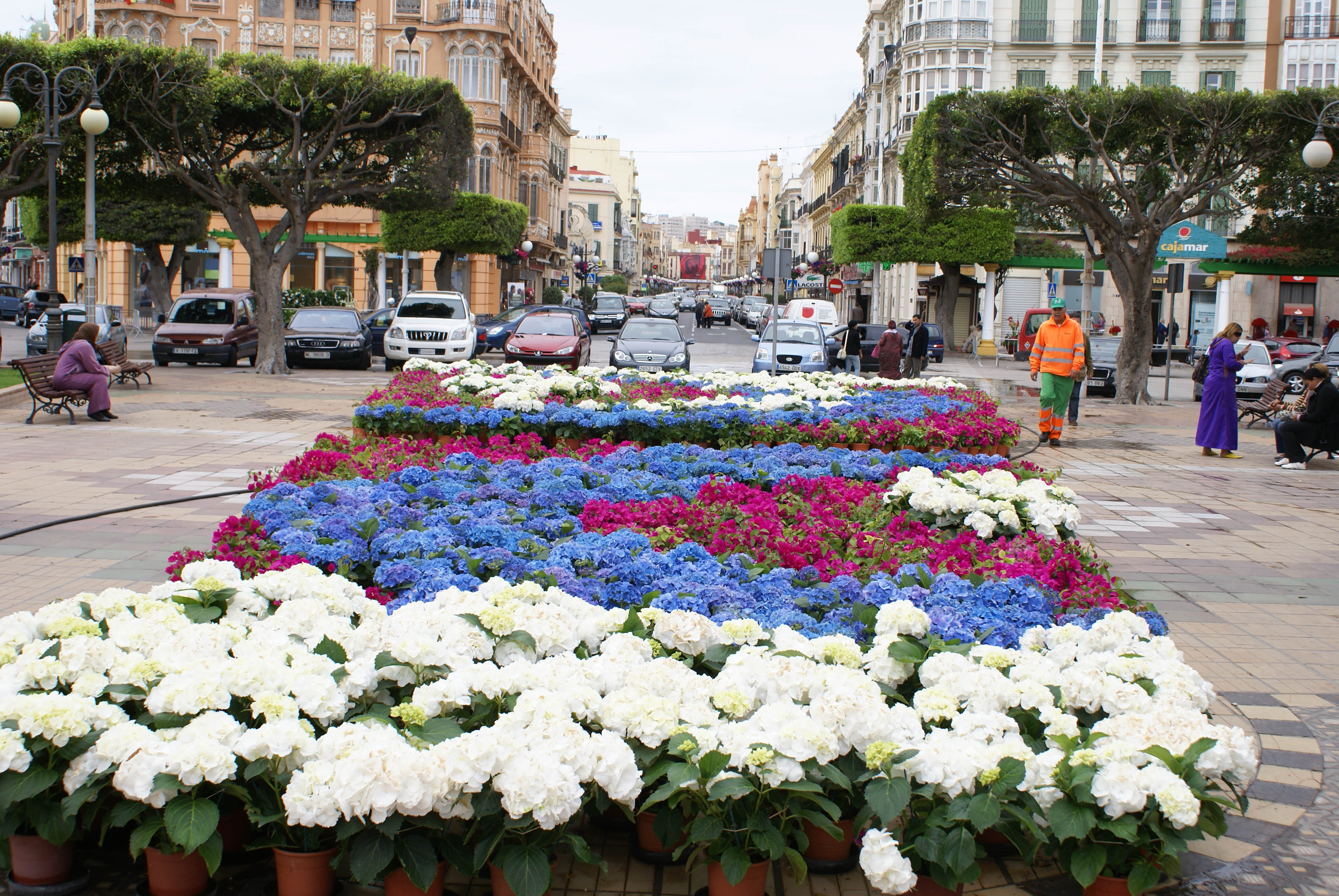

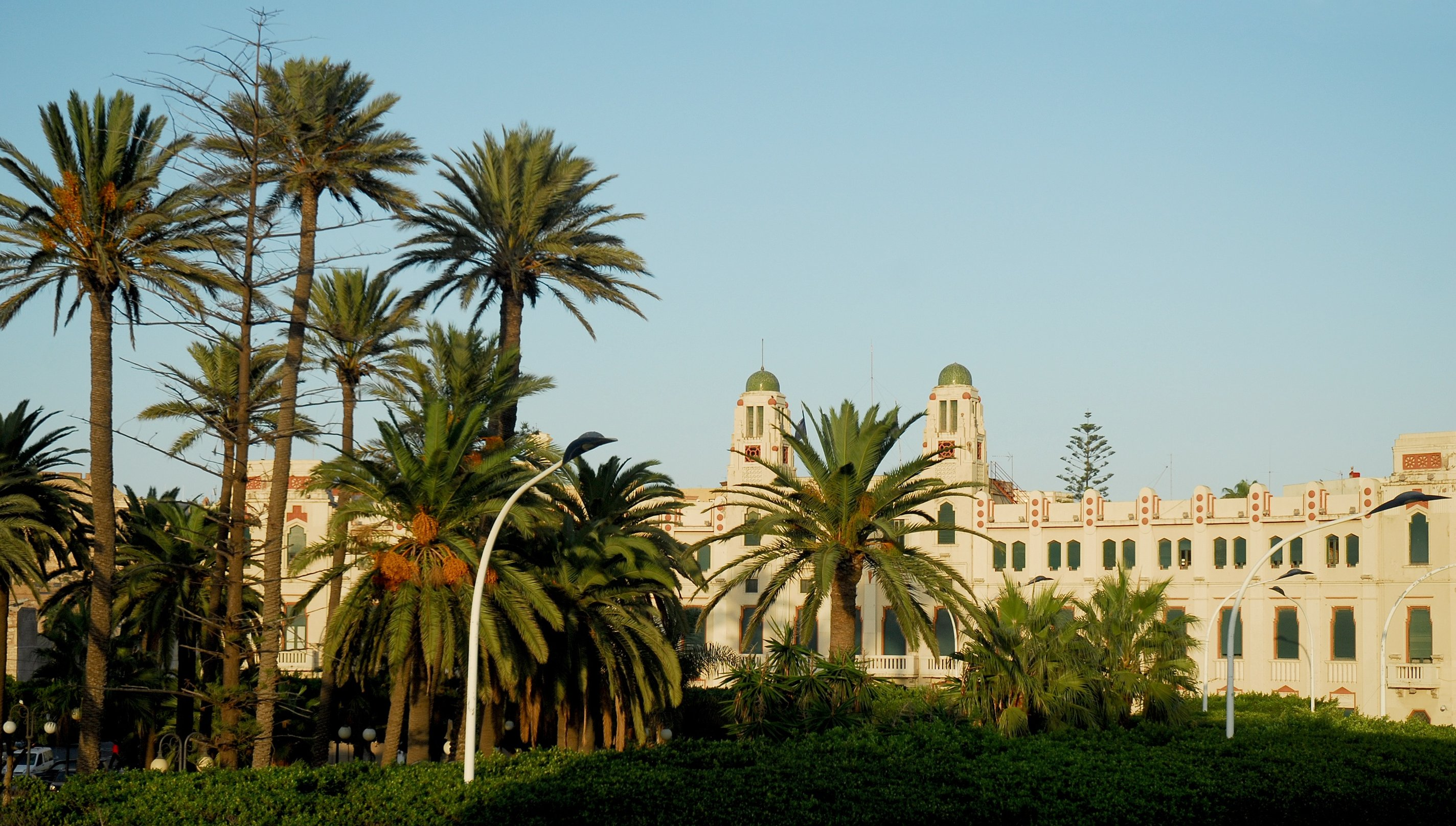
