= History of Soria =

Soria
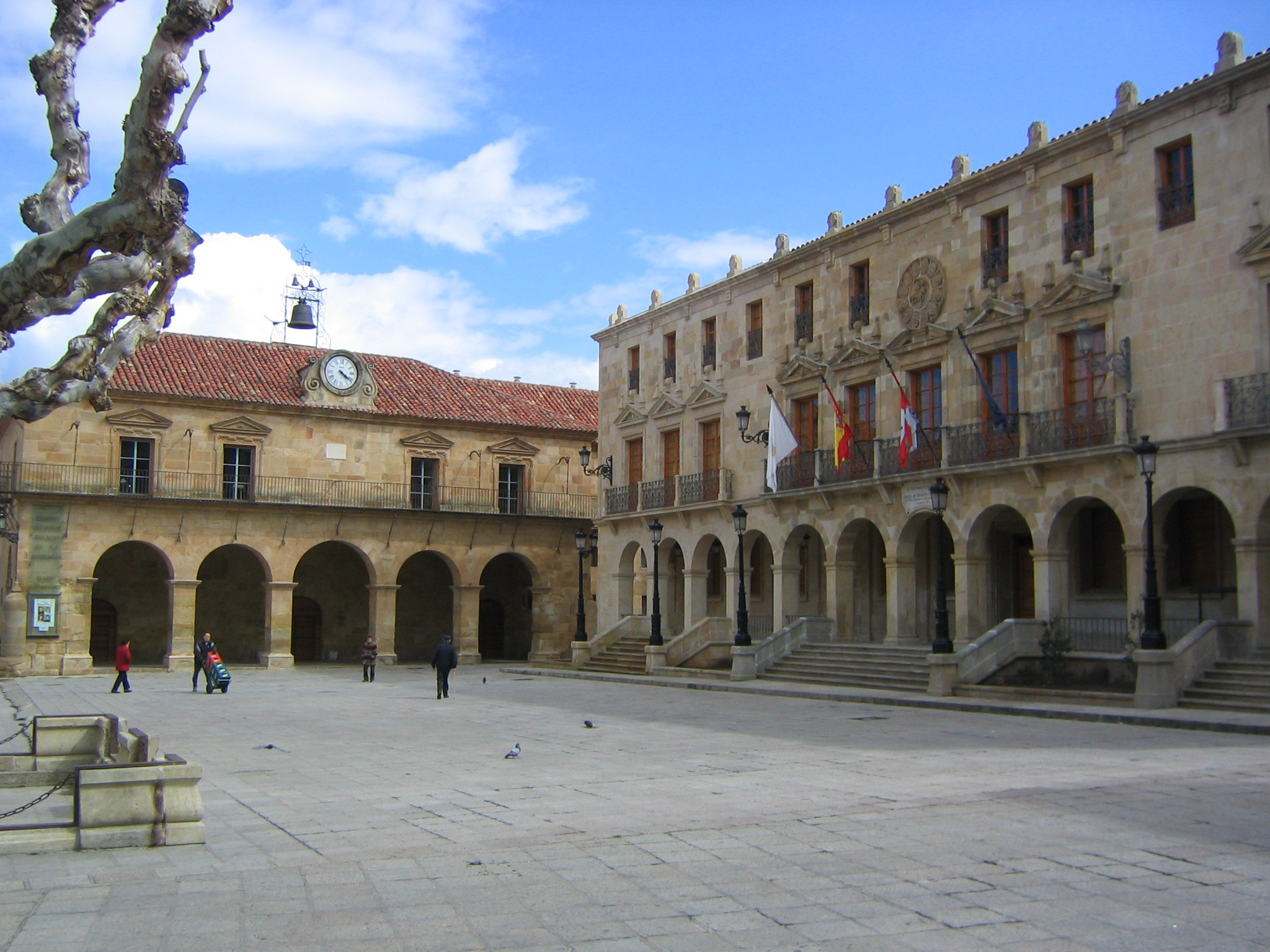
- The main square of Soria

Soria is a city located in modern-day north-central Spain. As of 2010, the municipality has a population of approximately 39,500 inhabitants, nearly 40% of the population of the province.

== Etymology ==
Bartolomé de Torres in his Topografía de la ciudad de Numancia, says that the castle of this city took its name Oria from a Greek knight called Dórico, captain of Dorians, who arrived to Soria from Achaea. From this it is deduced that the first settlers of Soria were Dorians. However, nothing about this has been corroborated by archaeology.

Other researchers defend that Soria derives from dauria or daurius, names that refer to the river Duero

== Early history ==
Just before the Roman conquest, the area of Soria was inhabited by the Arevaci and other Celtiberians. In what is now called Cerro del Castillo, was discovered an ancient settlement related to Numantia, the Arevaci city that resisted Roman conquest for a century and then committed collective suicide in order to escape slavery.

Some experts consider that the Suebi were among first settlers of Soria proper. The Suebi kings, according to Tutor and Malo in their Compedio historial de las dos Numancias, established in it one of their courts.

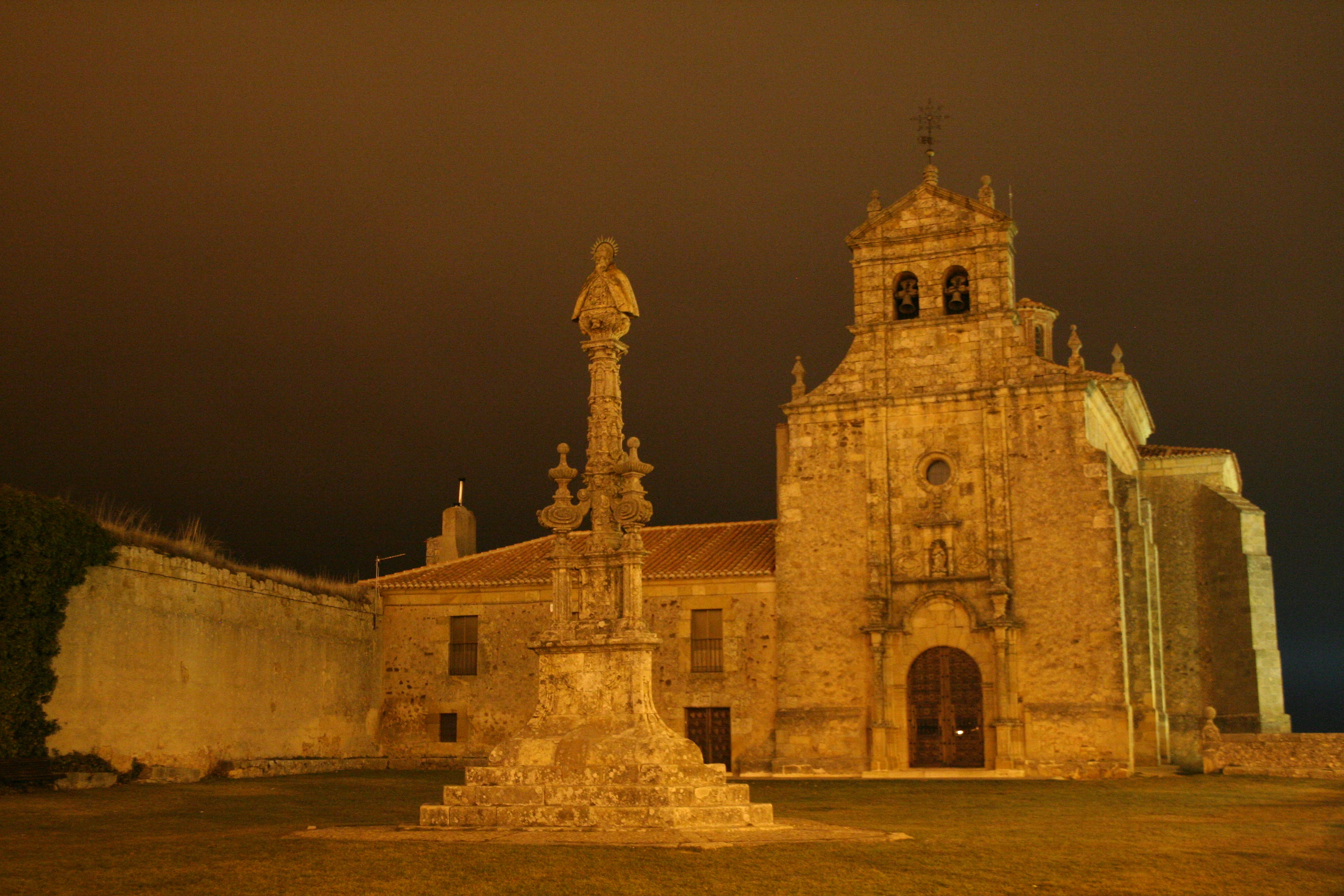
Madonna del Mirón Hermitage, started to be built in the 6th century AD by the Suebi.

== Arab conquest ==
Later, after the Arab conquest of Spain, it grew in importance due to its proximity to the border of the Christian lands, which in the 8th century had settled along the Duero river.

In 869 Soria was the centre of the rebellion of Suleyman ibn-Abus against the emir of Córdoba, who sent his son Hakan to quench it.

== Christian conquest ==
During the 11th century it became an important and strategic enclave due to its situation near Duero and it delimited the Christian and Muslim lands with the so-called "marca del Duero" or "línea del Duero". In the early 12th century the city was conquered by Alfonso I the Battler, being absorbed into the Kingdom of León in 1134. It was repopulated and became the head or main population of those frontier. This reflected in the slogan "Cabeza de Extremadura" present in the coat of arms of the city.

During the 12th century, Soria was an important location due to the battles between the kingdoms of León, Castile, Aragon and Navarre. When Alfonso VII died, the child king Alfonso VIII was protected by the Lara family in Soria. Alfonso VIII of Castile gave the city several privileges which it maintained until modern times as a reward for its support. It is generally believed that Alfonso VIII gave the city its Fuero Extenso, of great importance in the history of medieval law, and that was used as a basis for the Fuero Real (Other researchers, however, defend that the Fuero Real predates the Fuero Extenso). The Fuero Extenso already describes the medieval structure of the city between the local Nobility (Doce Linajes), the commoners (Jurados de Cuadrilla) and the surrounding villages (Sexmeros de la Tierra).

In 1195 the town was stormed by Sancho VII of Navarre, but later recovered and continued to develop its splendor and trades, mostly held by a community of Jews. A big source of revenue, Soria being head of some of the royal cañadas, was the wool industry. A proof of the importance of Soria in this period is its presence among the 16 cities with right of representation in the Castilian Parliament (the Cortes).

At the end of the 14th century, Henry II of Castile gave Soria to Bertrand Du Guesclin, as a reward for his support during the Castilian Civil War. The local population rebelled against the royal decision, and Du Guescin army stormed the city.

== Decline ==
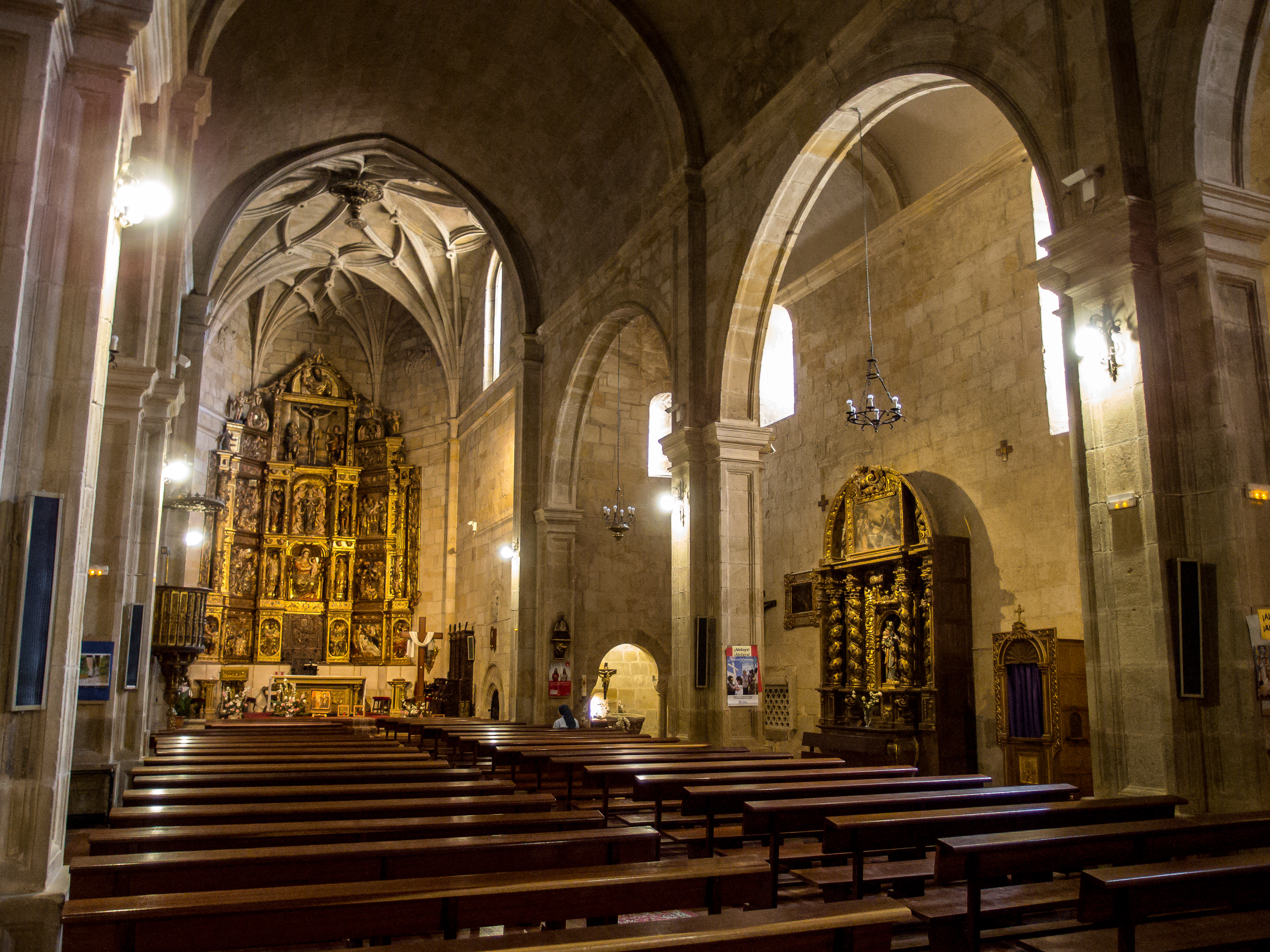
Interior of the church of Nuestra Señora de la Mayor, built in the 16th century.

Soria lost most of its importance after the unification of Aragon and Castile in 1479, and above all after the decree of exile issued against the Jews in 1492.

By 1530 the city would roughly have between 4,000 and 5,500 inhabitants.

In the War of Spanish Succession (1701–1714), Soria sided with Philip V.

In 1808, it was captured and set on fire by the French troops.

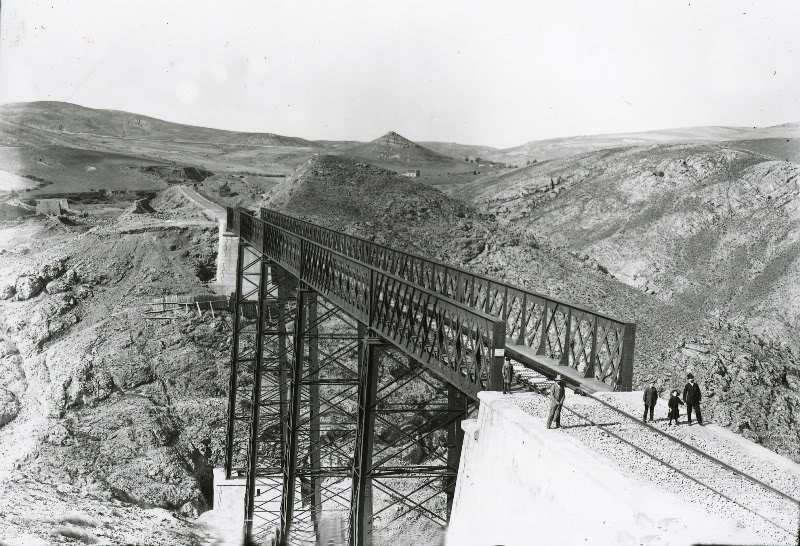
The Soria viaduct (1890)

== Modern ==
The economic and social crisis in Spain in the early 20th century, and the Spanish Civil War during Francisco Franco's dictatorship which followed, had negative effects on Soria and the surrounding area, which became depopulated due to increased emigration.

The policy of the current authorities aims to strengthen the local economy pivoting on Soria's tourism potential, and has also launched a program of reconstruction for the neighboring villages.
