= Melilla Fair =

Annual fair in Spain

Melilla September Fair Feria de Melilla
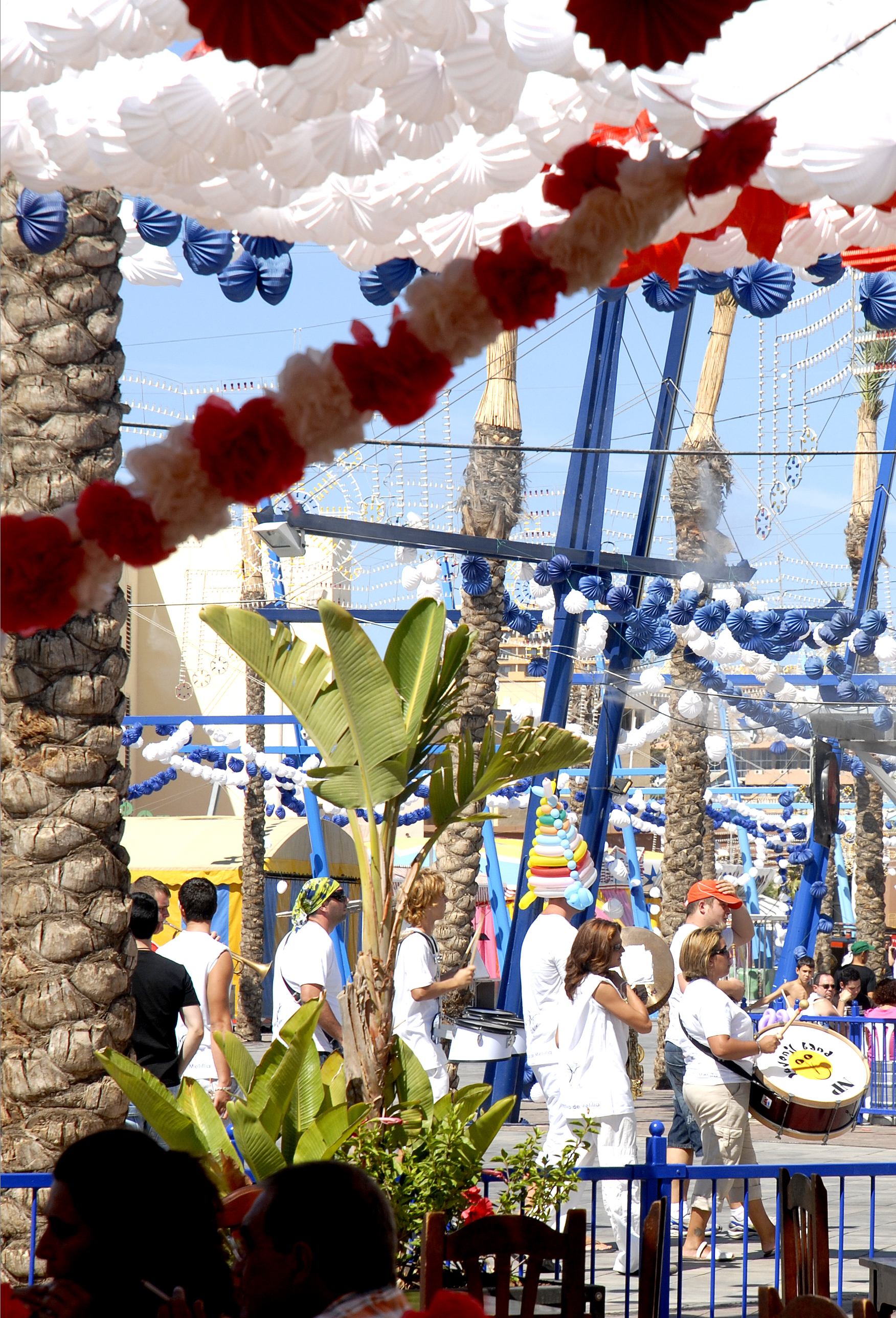
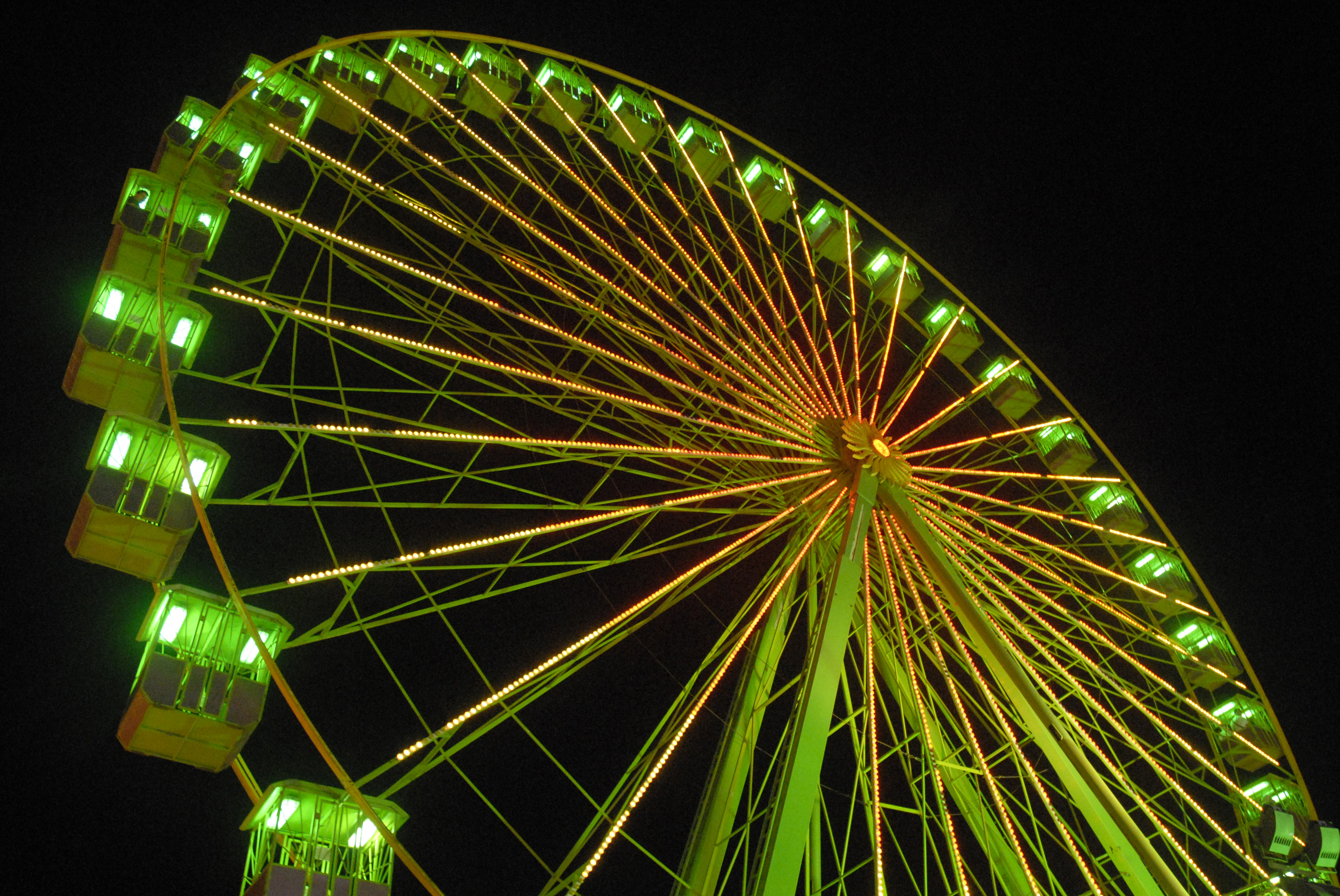
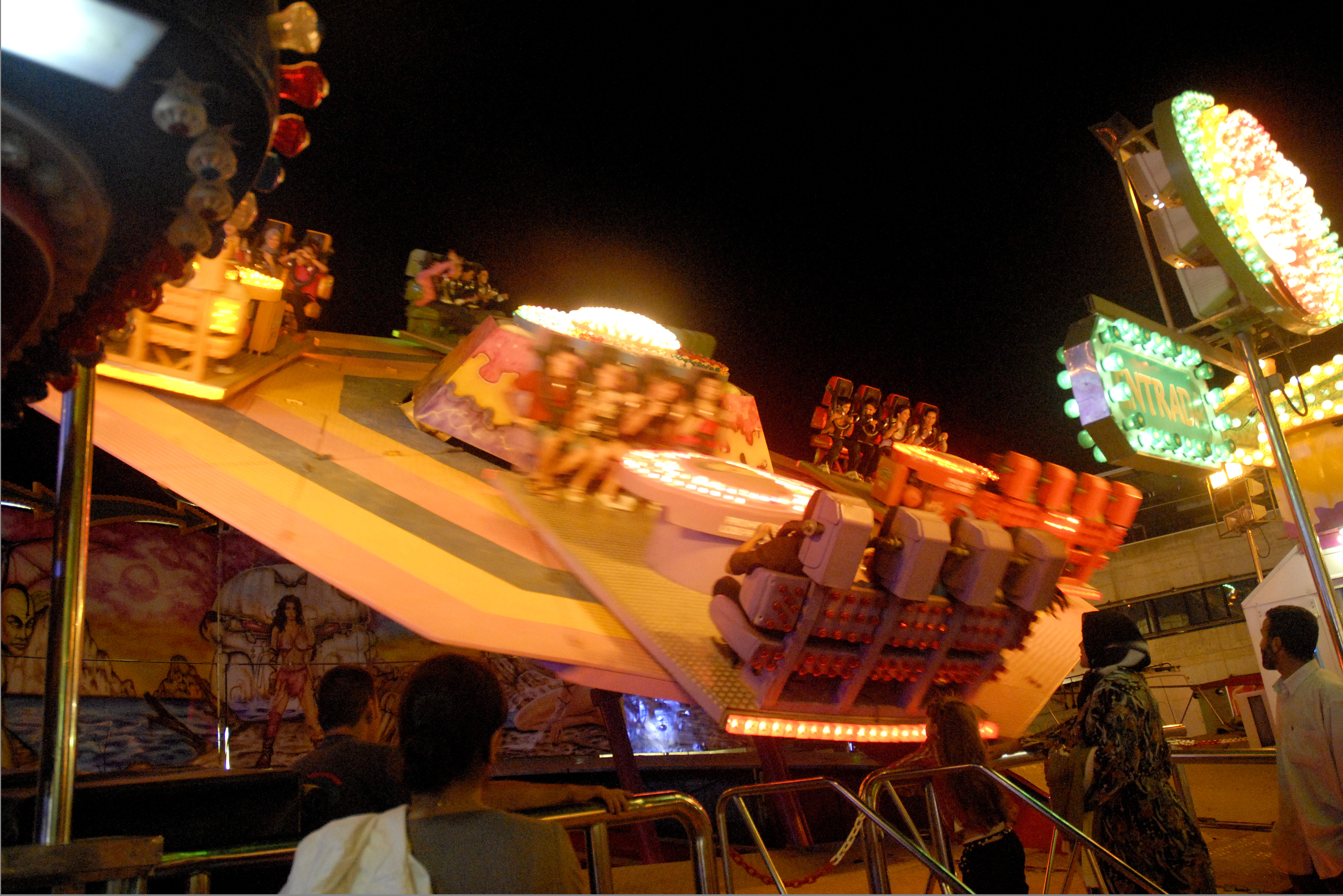
- Locations: Melilla, Spain
- Coordinates: 35°17′40″N 2°56′06″W
- Founded: 1 September 1903

Melilla Fair (officially and in Spanish: Feria de Melilla) is held in Melilla, a Spanish enclave in North Africa and celebrated in honor of its Patron Saint, the Virgin of Victory and whose fairgrounds are located in the Multifunctional Esplanade of San Lorenzo, a modern environment for a traditional fair, close to the marina.

== History ==
The fair was first held in 1903.

== Description ==
In recent years, the Day Fair has become popular, with dozens of private and official stalls and establishments for having an aperitif, with Melilla's gastronomy, as varied and multicultural as its population, to the rhythm of rumbas and sevillanas.

The festival grounds are filled with entertainment, rociero groups, clubs and performances.

The Official Festivities Booth offers musical performances from the Peninsula and from local groups on the rise who are looking for a place in the national artistic scene.

On September 8, the day of the Virgin of Victory, the patron saint of Melilla. The festive atmosphere givesplace above the walls to go down to the Modernist Ensanche.

== Date of celebration ==
The fair has been held since 1903 and lasts eight days.

== The bulls ==
The bulls in the Bullring of Melilla have been linked to the celebration of the fair since the beginning.
