= National monuments of Spain =

The current legislation regarding historical monuments in Spain dates from 1985. However, Monumentos nacionales (to use the original term) were first designated in the nineteenth century. It was a fairly broad category for national heritage sites protecting, for example, the Alhambra. The overarching category for Spanish heritage sites is now Bien de Interés Cultural ("good of cultural interest").

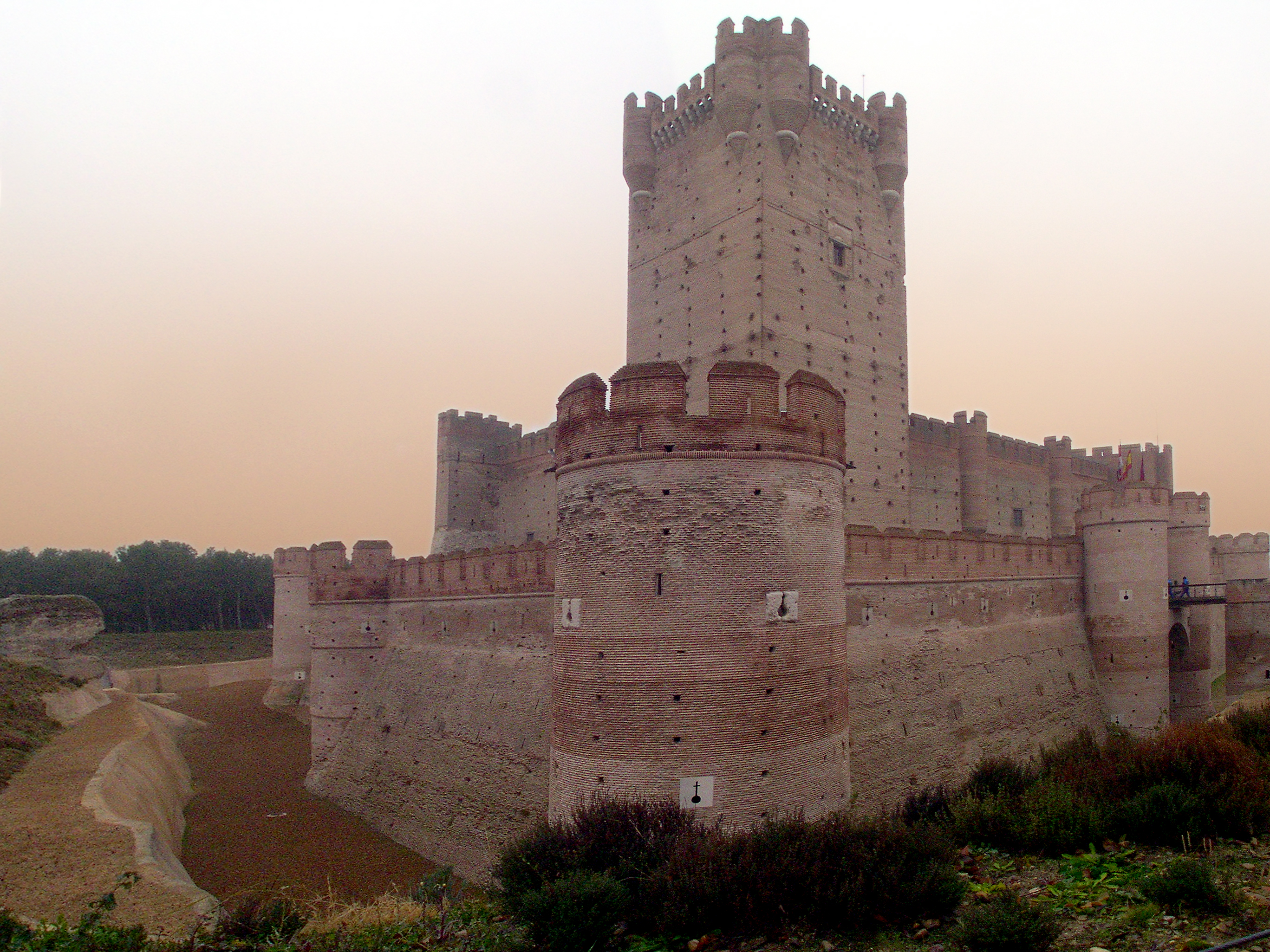
Panoramic view of the Castle of La Mota

Now there are some 13,000 monuments registered by the Ministry of Culture within the wider category of Bien de Interés Cultural. As well as monuments, the category of Bien de Interés Cultural includes the following sub-categories of non-movable heritage:

- Conjunto histórico, a type of conservation area (which may include one or more monuments).
- Jardín histórico, historic garden (for example the gardens of Aranjuez)
- Sitio histórico, which includes cultural landscapes (for example the Bulls of Guisando)
- Zona arqueológica, archaeological zone (for example the Archaeological Site of Atapuerca)

Some Spanish sites are protected under more than one sub-category. For example, the Alhambra and Generalife receive protection as monument, garden and conjunto histórico.

== Examples ==
A few of numerous articles at Wikipedia covering Spanish monuments are:

- Numantia (designated 1882, and protection enhanced by a Zona Arqueológica in 1999)
- Castle of La Mota (1904)
- Church of Nuestra Señora de la Mayor (1929)
- Cuéllar Castle (1931)
- San Sebastian Church, Madrid (1969)
- San Cayetano Church, Madrid (1980)

== See also ==
- Bien de Interés Cultural
