= Plaza de Toros de Melilla =

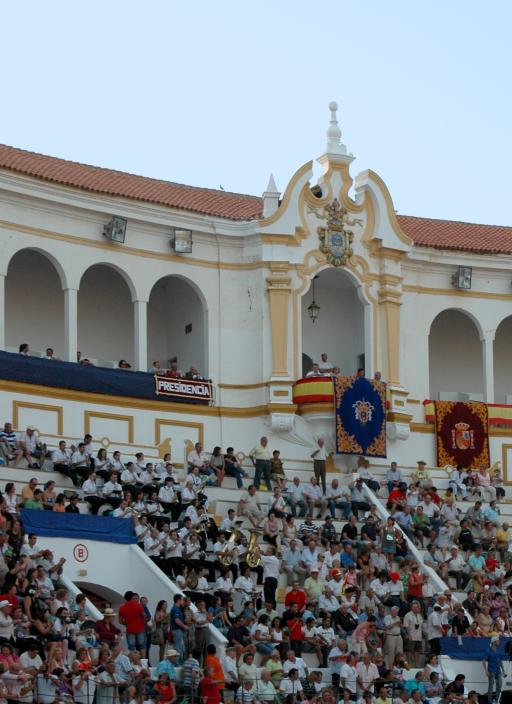
- Interactive map of Plaza de Toros de Melilla
- Location: Melilla, Spain
- Coordinates: 35°17′21″N 2°56′32″W
- Capacity: 8,800

Construction
- Opened: 1947
- Renovated: 2019

Plaza de Toros de Melilla is a bullring in Melilla, Spain. It is currently used for bullfighting. The stadium was built in 1946 and holds 8,800 people.
