= Church of Nuestra Señora de la Mayor, Soria =

Church in Castile and León, Spain

Coordinates: 41°45′49″N 2°27′49″W

The Church of Nuestra Señora de la Mayor is a Roman Catholic church in Soria, Castile and León, Spain.

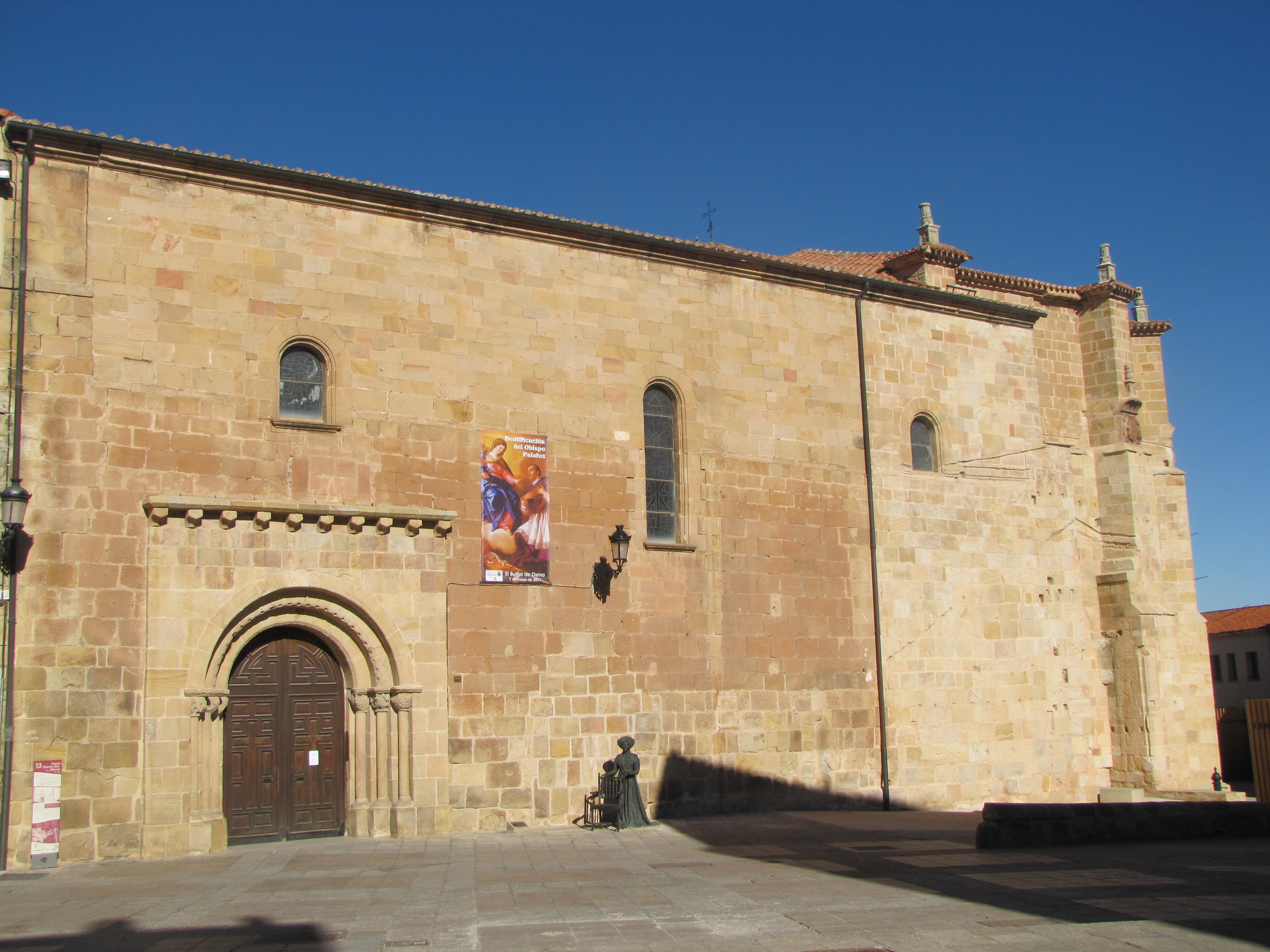
Exterior of the church

It was built in the 16th century on the remains of the Romanesque church of Saint Giles, dating from the 12th or the 13th century. The low, square-shaped tower was part of the original building.

== Exterior ==
The Romanesque doorway in the southern wall is composed of three archivolts and decorated capitals. Next to this entrance stands the bronze sculpture (2012) by Ricardo Gonzalez Gil, representing Leonor Izquierdo Cuevas, dressed in the fashion of her time.

== Interior ==
The interior of the church is composed of a nave, covered by a ribbed vault, and two aisles covered by barrel vaults.

The walnut choir dates from 1523. Its origin is uncertain and probably originated from the collegiate church of San Pedro or from the abbey of La Merced.

The massive altarpiece is the work of Francisco de Agreda (1571), with influences of Juan de Juni. Its style shows a transition between the plateresque style and Mannerism.

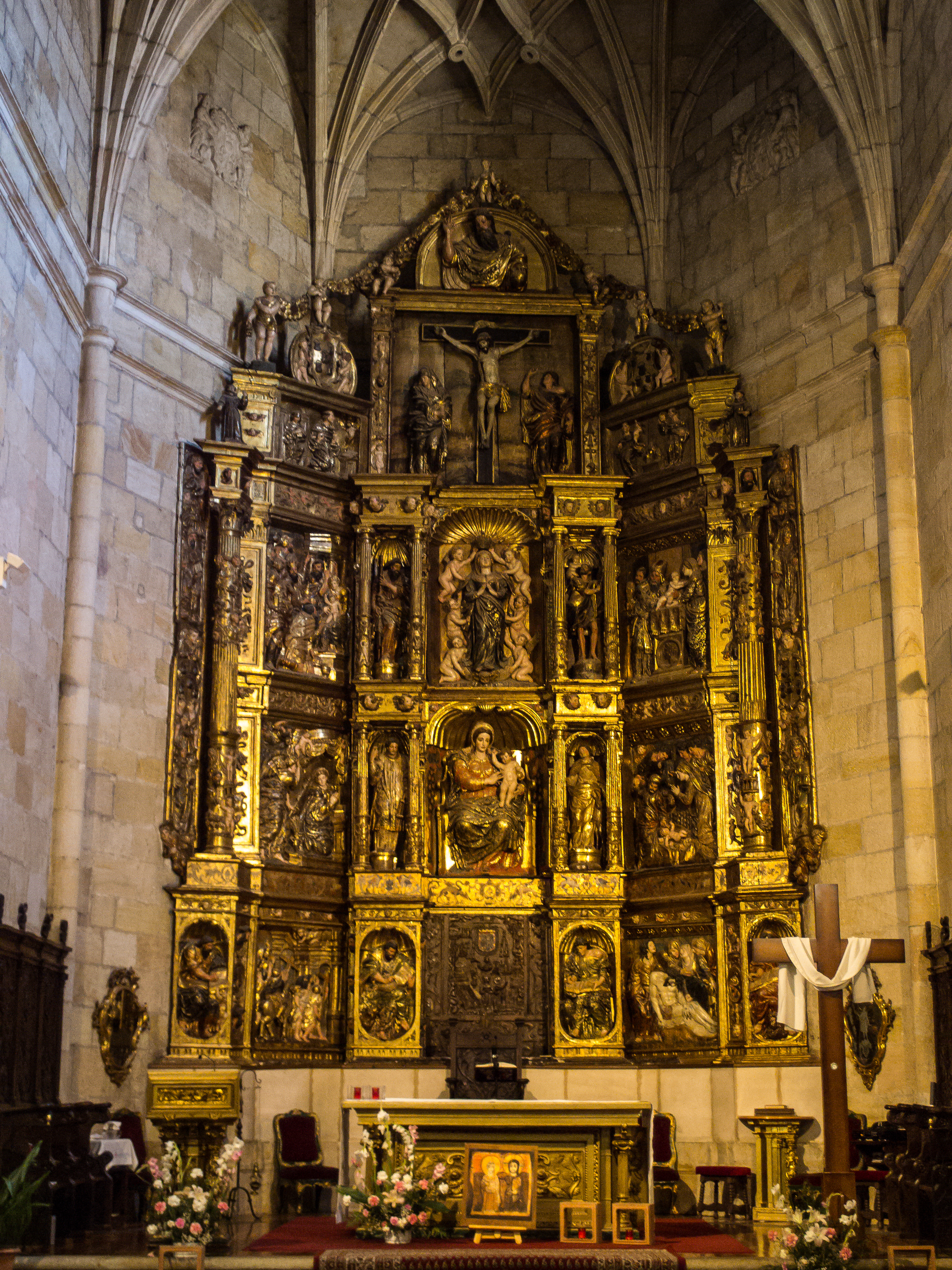
Altarpiece

== Conservation ==
Significantly reconstructed in the 19th century to prevent imminent ruin, the church was subsequently declared a national monument in 1929.
