= Jardín histórico =

A jardín histórico is a Spanish historic garden. In Spain Jardín histórico is a heritage listing which protects historic gardens. (The English equivalent would be the English Heritage 'Register of Historic Parks and Gardens of special historic interest in England'). The Spanish listing was established in 1983, replacing a former heritage category Jardín artístico. It is currently regulated by the Ministry of Education, Culture and Sport.

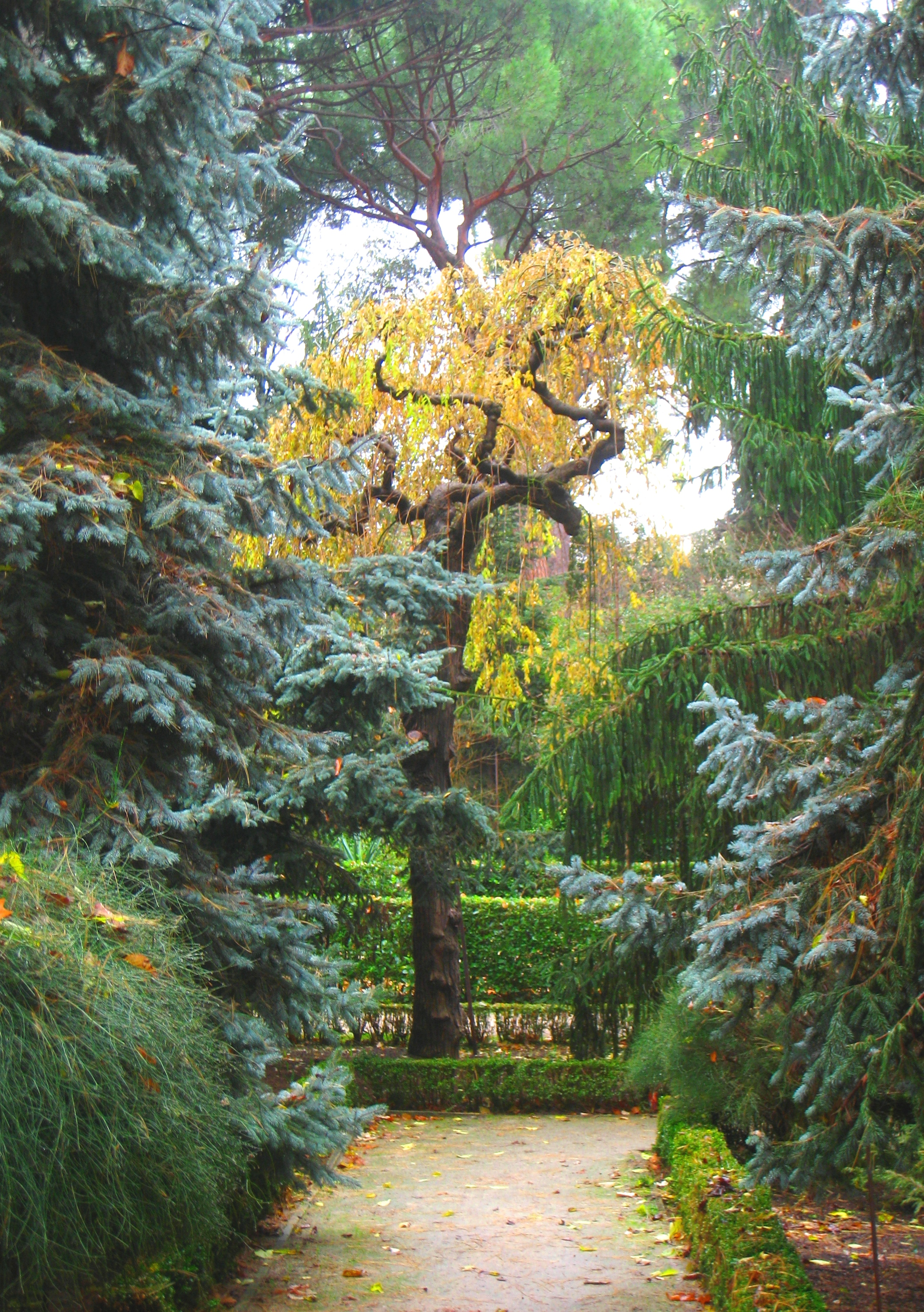
Madrid's Royal Botanical Garden has been at its current location since 1774.

Some of Spain's national heritage sites are protected under more than one classification. For example, the Alhambra and Generalife are designated for buildings and gardens.

Individual trees may be protected by Árbol singular status (the Spanish equivalent of a Tree preservation order). For example, a taxodium mucronatum which is one of the oldest trees in the Buen Retiro Park is catalogued as an arbol singular and can be viewed with other remarkable trees on a trail.

== See also ==
- Bien de Interés Cultural. Jardín histórico is a sub-category within a broader category of Bien de Interés Cultural, which protects Spain's cultural heritage.

As well as gardens, the category of Bien de Interés Cultural includes the following sub-categories of non-movable heritage:

  - Conjunto histórico, a type of conservation area (which may include one or more monuments).
  - Monumento
  - Sitio histórico (for example the Bulls of Guisando)
  - Zona arqueológica, archaeological zone (for example the Archaeological Site of Atapuerca)
- Spanish garden
