= Route of the Temples =

- Ruta de los Templos
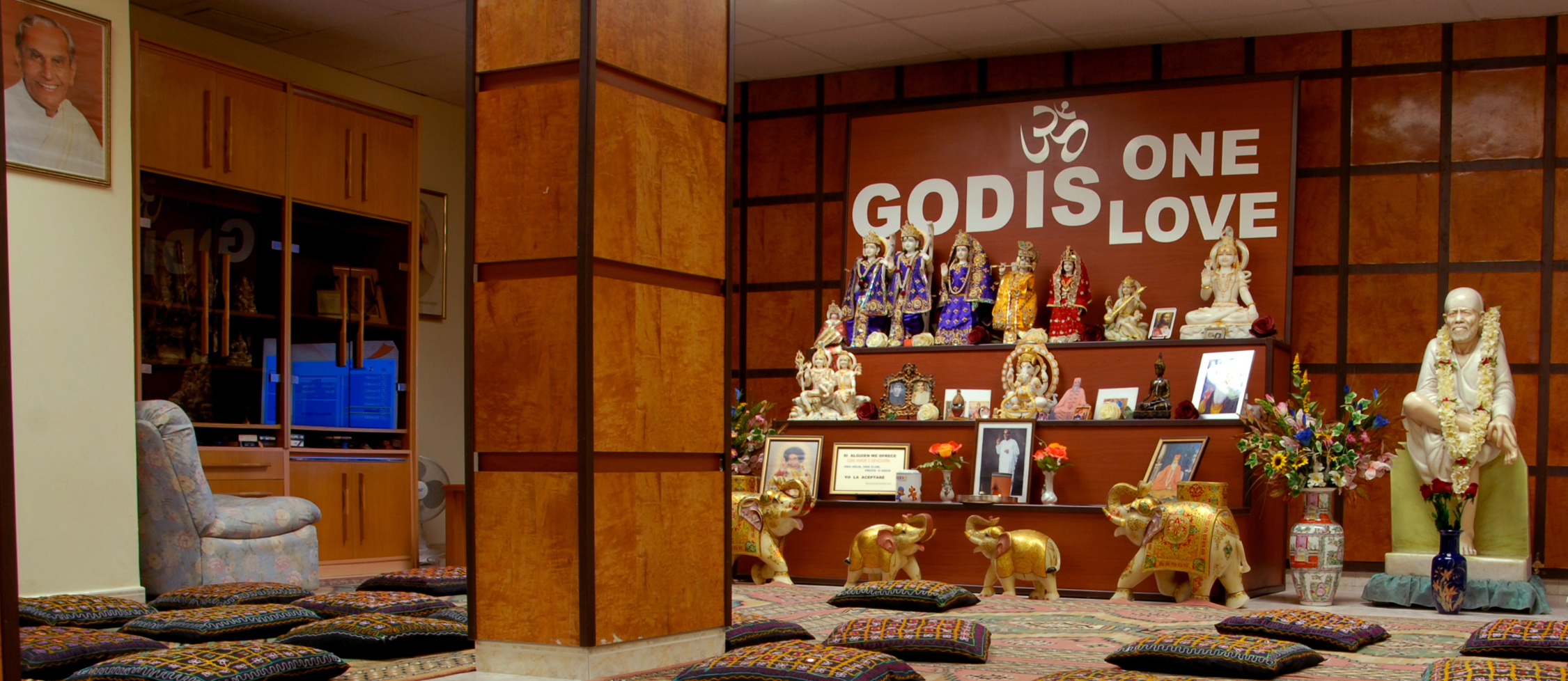
- Established: 2006
- Location: Melilla, Spain
- Coordinates: 35°17′31″N 02°56′27″W
- Type: Tourist route
- Visitors: 3,000 (2011)
- Owners: Ministry of Economy, Trade, Technological Innovation, Tourism and Development
- Website: Official Website

Route of the Temples is a tourist route in Melilla, Spain, which includes a visit to the main 4 temples in the city. The route begins with a visit to the Church of the Immaculate Conception, the oldest in Melilla (1657), in late Romanesque style and with a Baroque interior, on whose altar is the much-venerated image of the city's patron saint, the Virgin of Victory. Next, tourists head to the Or Zaruah Synagogue, a modernist building from 1924. The next temple to visit is the Hindu Temple, also located in a modernist building, and finally the Central Mosque, founded in 1950.

== History ==
The Route of the Temples of Melilla was created in 2006 as an initiative of the Tourism Board in search of a tourist product that would contribute to the economic development of the city, through its cultural and religious projection abroad.

In 2026, Melilla's government granted €40,000 to its Jewish community for cultural activities and synagogue maintenance as part of this tourist route.

== Gallery ==
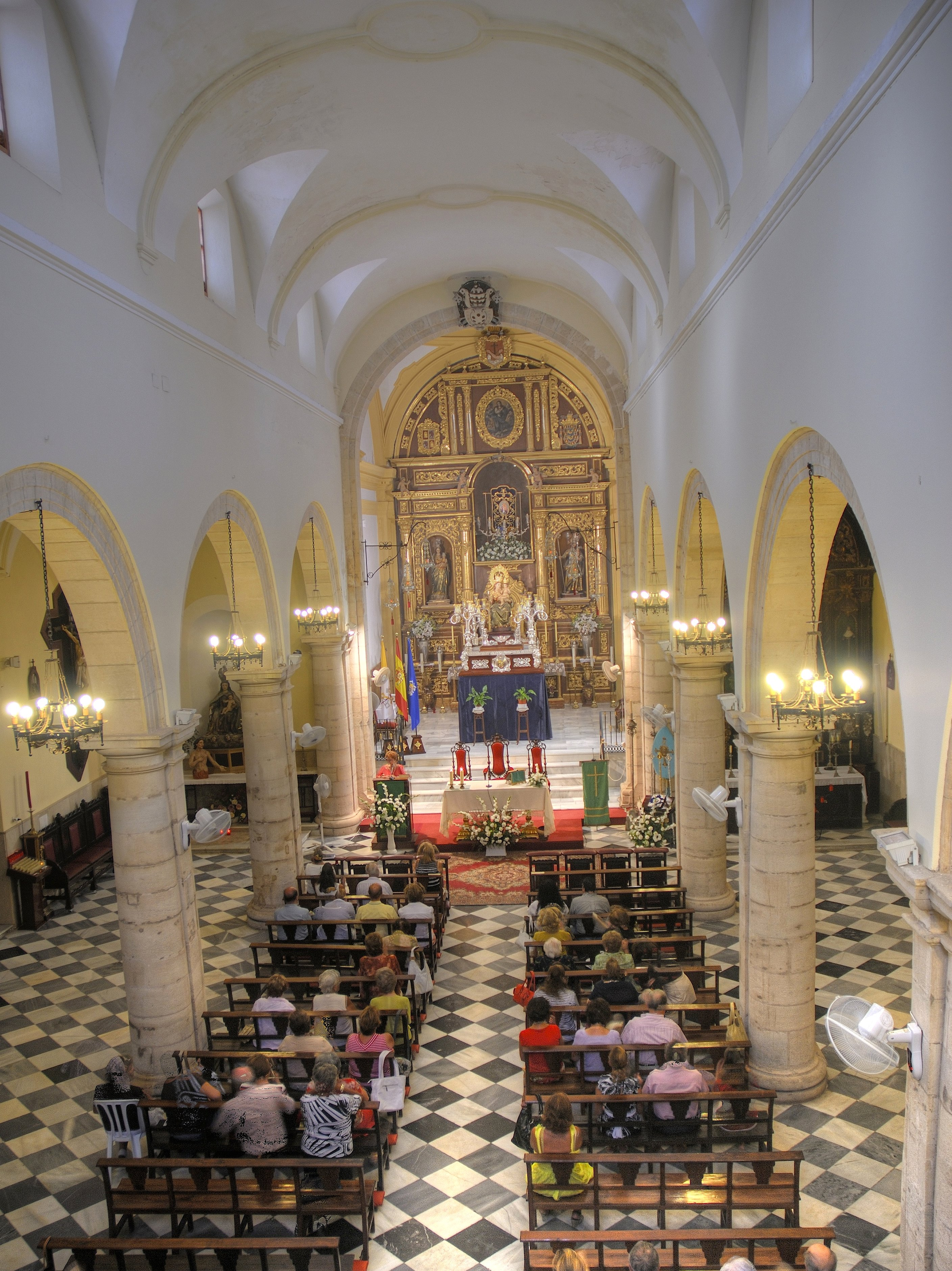
Church of the Immaculate Conception

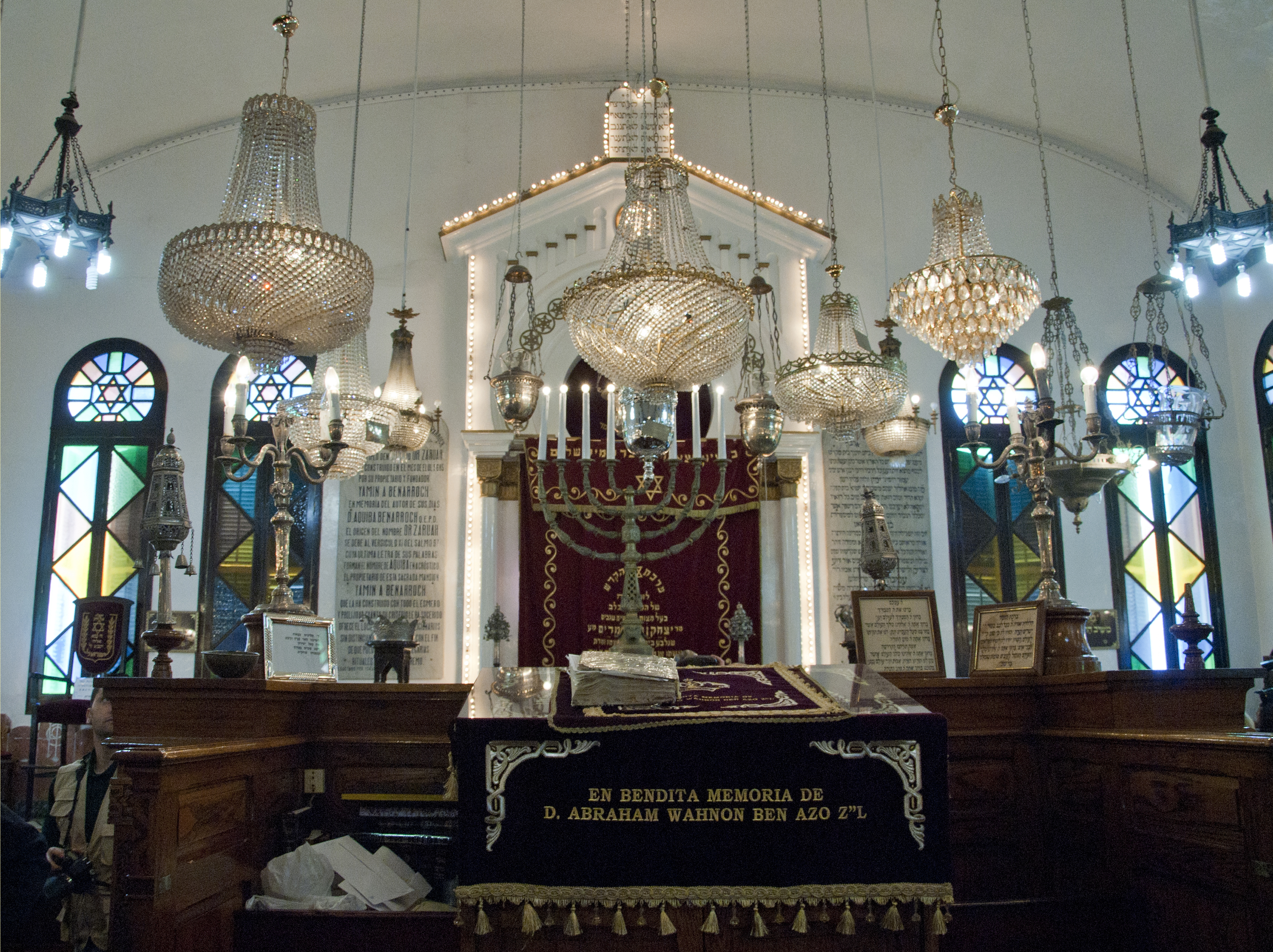
Or Zaruah Synagogue

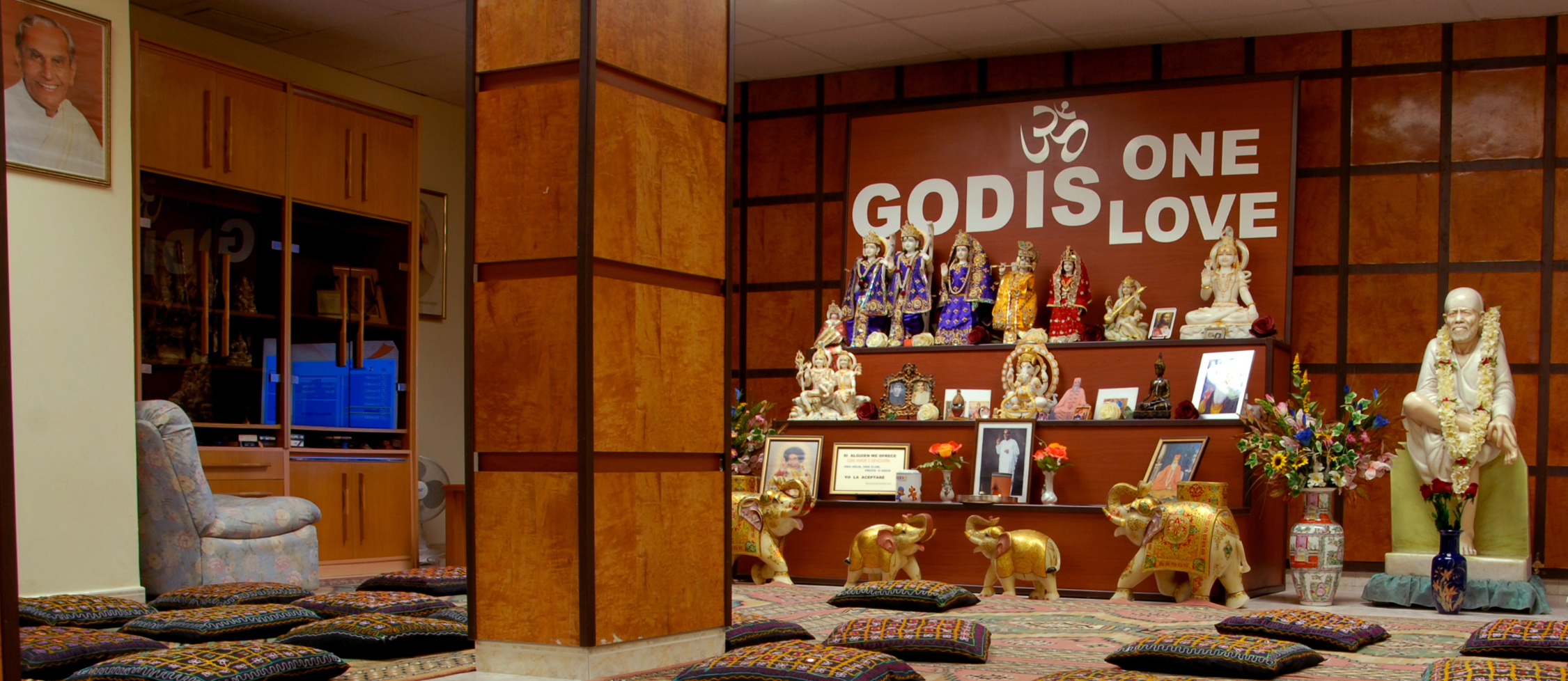
Hindu Temple

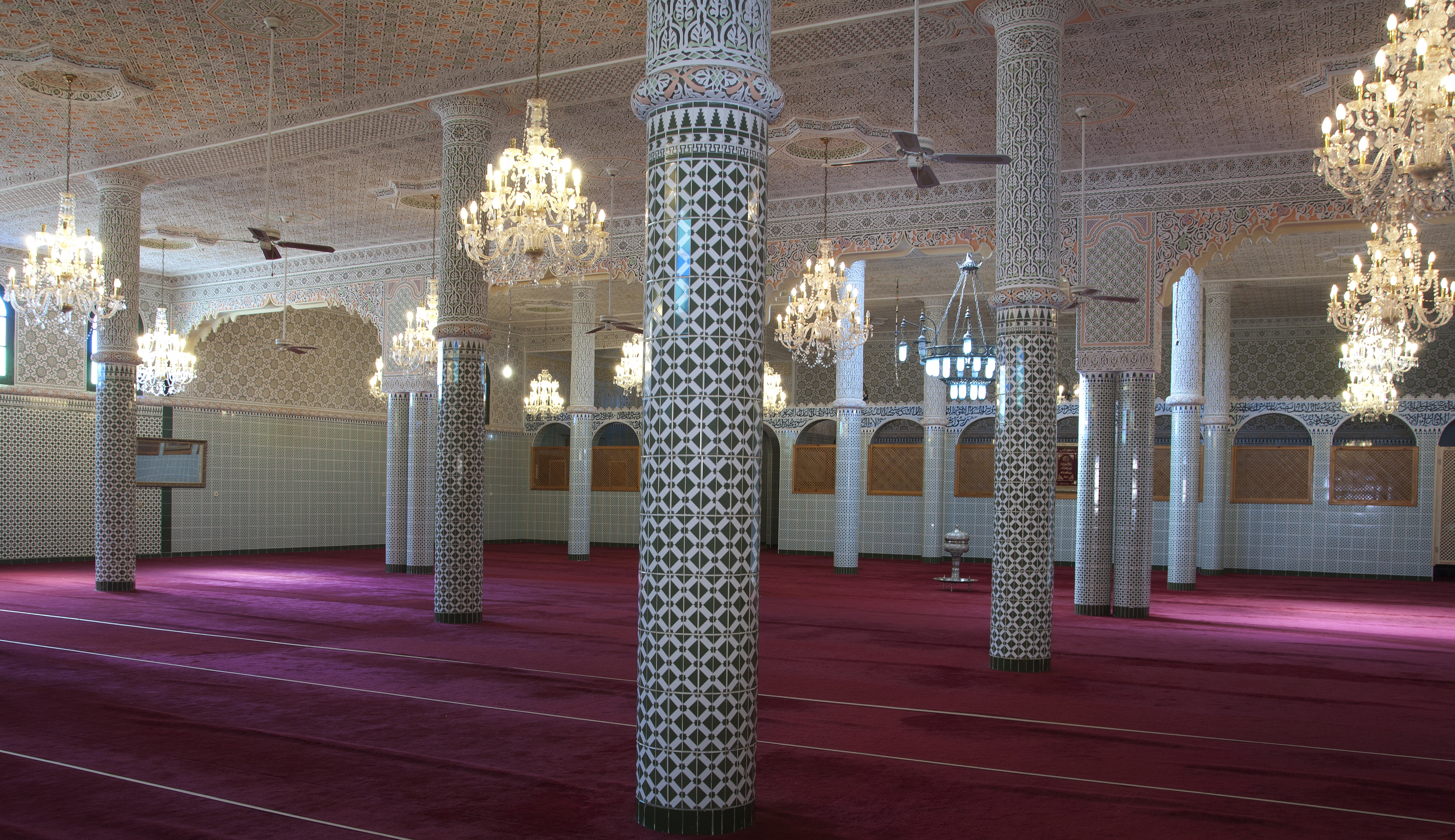
Central Mosque
