= Melilla =

Spanish autonomous city in northwestern Africa

Melilla Mřič
- Autonomous city
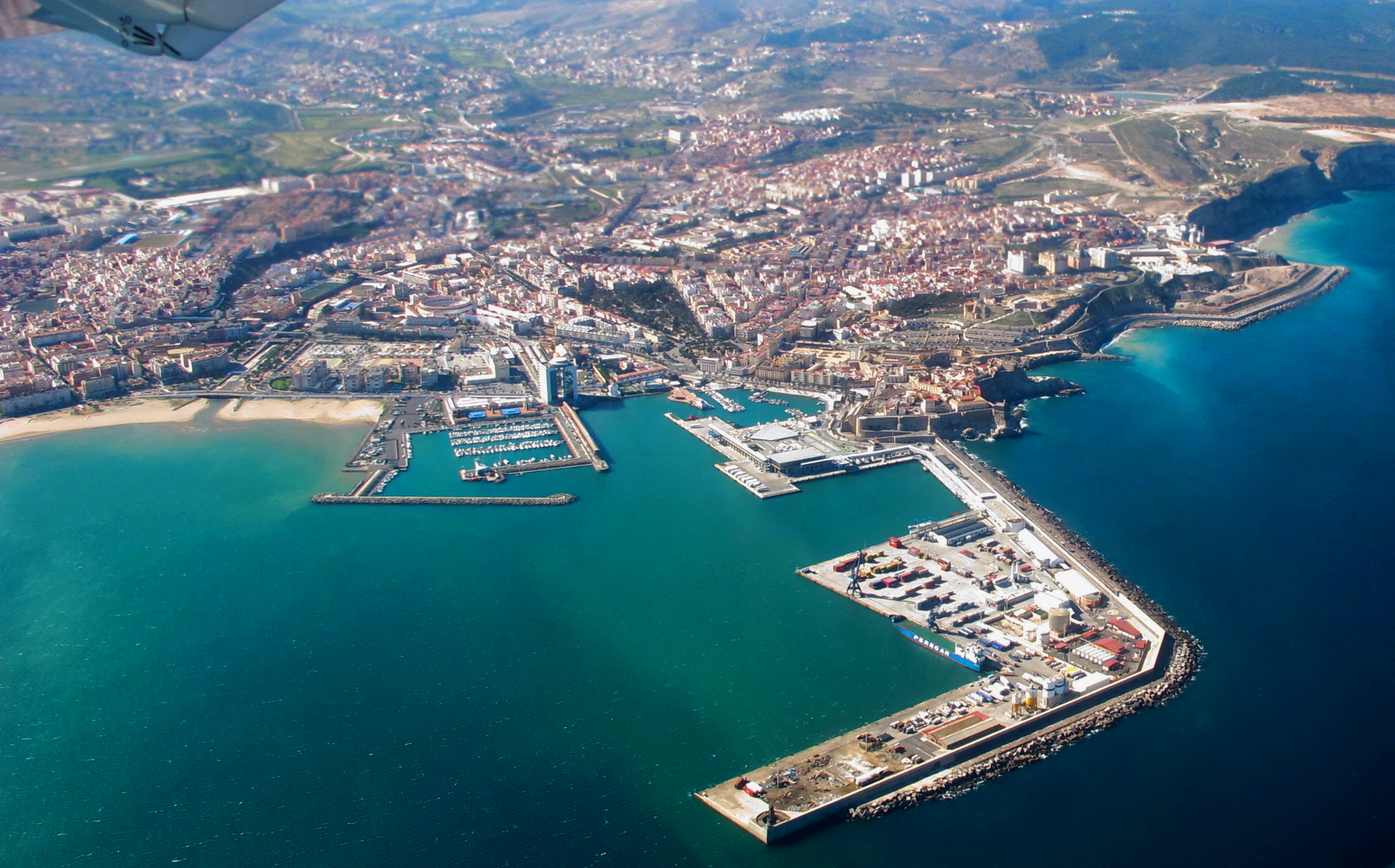
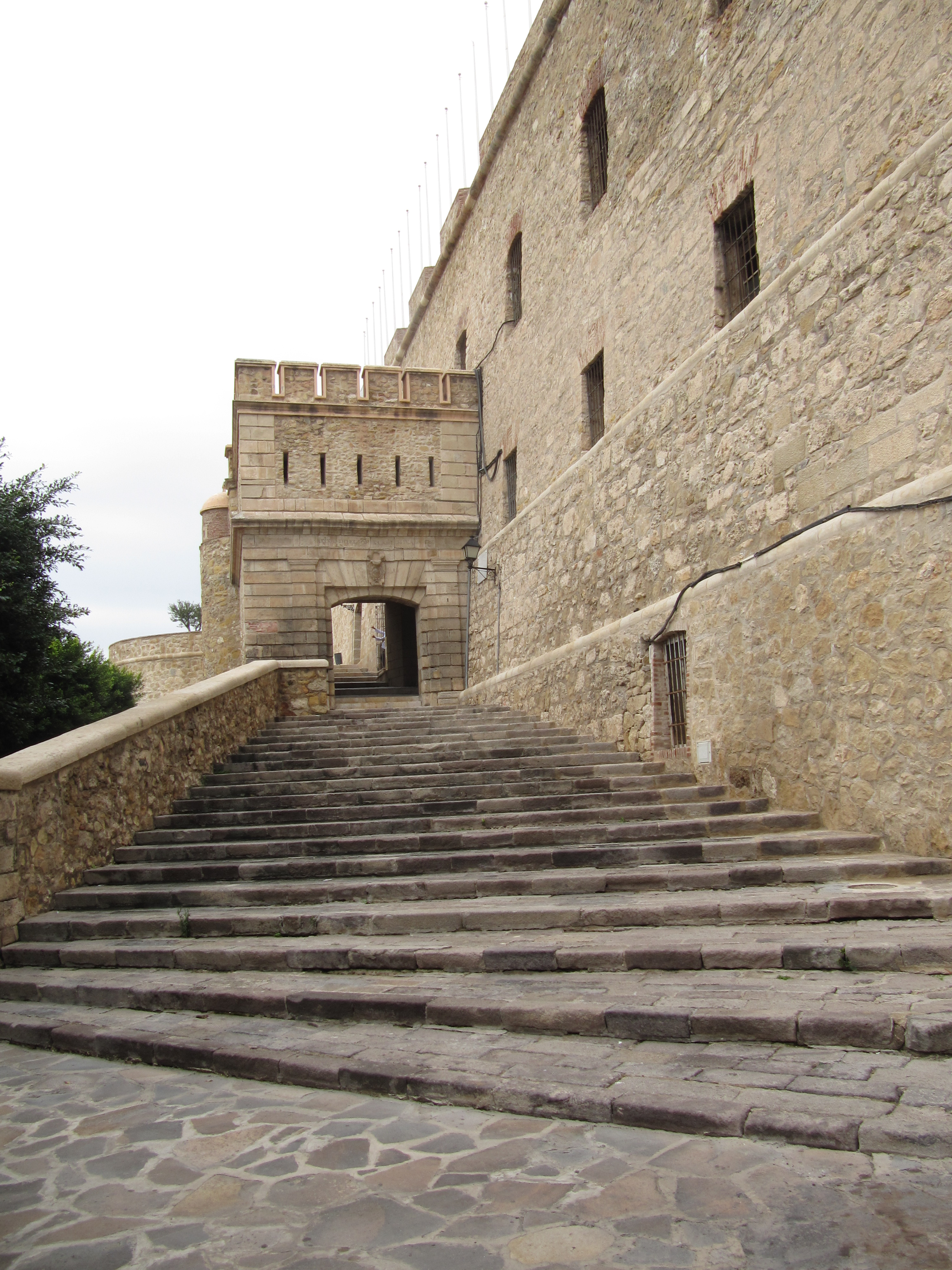
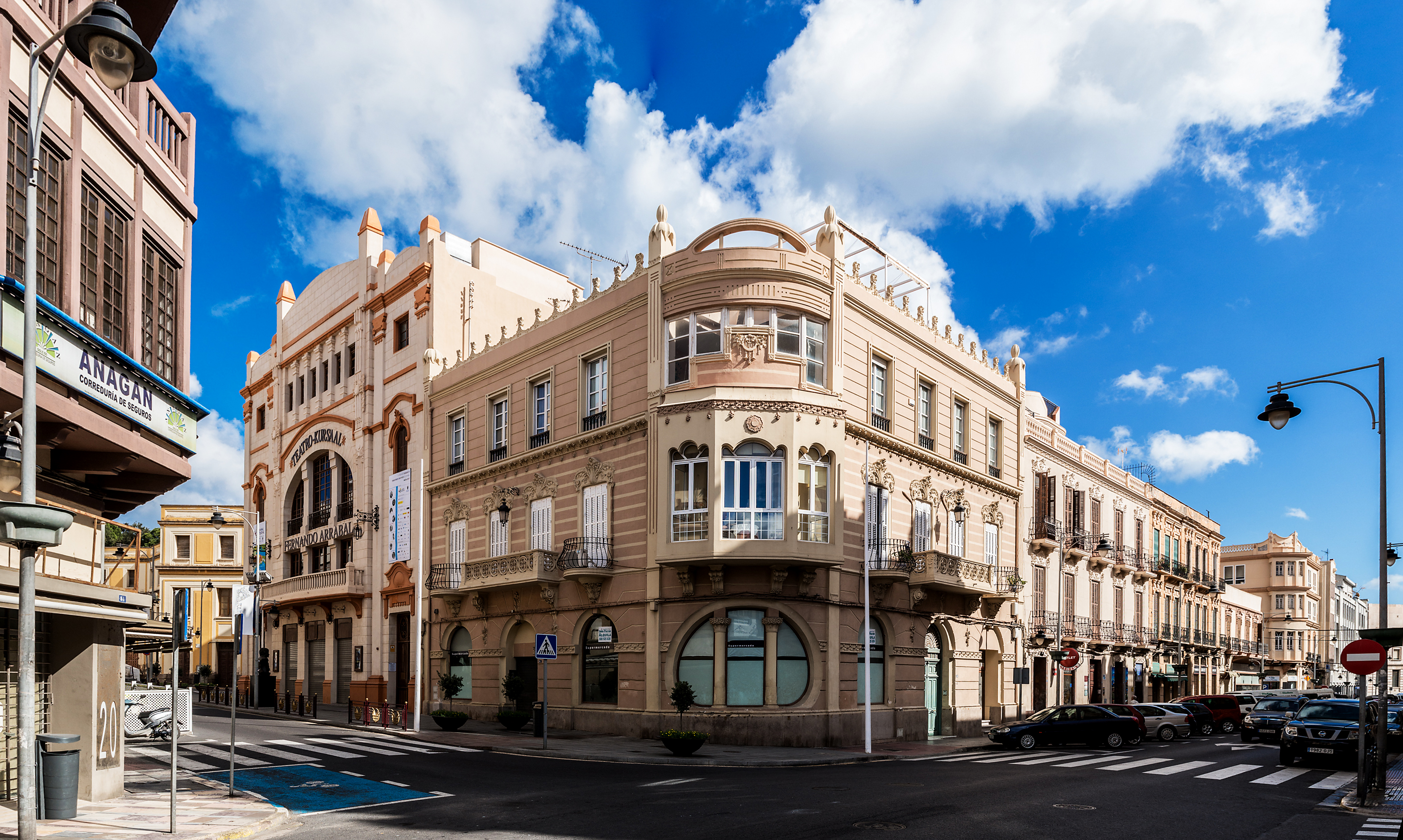
- Aerial view Old city Modernist buildings

- Flag Coat of arms

- Location of Melilla in Spain
- Interactive map of Melilla
- Coordinates: 35°17′32″N 2°56′27″W
- Country: Spain

Government
  - Mayor-President: Juan José Imbroda (PP)
  - Legislature: Assembly of Melilla

Area
  - Total: 14.24 km^{2} (5.50 sq mi)
  - Rank: 19th in Spain
- 0.003% of Spain

Population (2025)
  - Total: 87,067
  - Rank: 18th in Spain
  - Density: 6,114/km^{2} (15,840/sq mi)
  - Rank: 1st in Spain
- 0.2% of Spain
- Demonyms: English: Melillan; Spanish: Melillense

GDP
  - Total: €1.826 billion (2024)
  - Per capita: €20,988 (2024)
- Time zone: UTC+01:00 (CET)
  - Summer (DST): UTC+02:00 (CEST)
- ISO 3166 code: ES-ML
- Official languages: Spanish
- Statute of Autonomy: 14 March 1995
- Congress: 1 deputy (of 350)
- Senate: 2 senators (of 264)
- Currency: Euro (€) (EUR)
- HDI (2022): 0.867 very high · 18th
- Website: melilla.es

Melilla (/mɛˈliːjə/, Spanish: [meˈliʝa]; Tarifit: Mřič) is an autonomous city of Spain on the North African coast. It lies on the eastern side of the Cape Three Forks, on the Morocco–Spain border, adjacent to the Moroccan port town of Beni Ansar, and faces the Mediterranean Sea. It has an area of 14.24 km^{2} (5.50 sq mi).

The trading outpost of Rusadir was established on the current site by seafaring Phoenicians. Passed over among several powers during Antiquity and the middle ages, the place was forsaken amid strife between the Kingdoms of Fez and Tlemcen, and it was seized by Christians in 1497, constituting a condominium between the House of Medina Sidonia and the Crown of Castile until 1556. Integrated in the Hispanic Monarchy, the fortress of Melilla la Vieja remained a military praesidium with limited civilian population for much of the early modern period. After the expansion of Melilla's perimeter to its current limits in the wake of the Treaty of Wad Ras (1860), the area in between Melilla la Vieja and the outer forts was urbanised and populated by mainland Spaniards, Sephardi Jews and Riffians, and the local economy thrived from the mining (iron ore) operations in the eastern Rif. Prior to the passing of its Statute of Autonomy in 1995, Melilla was a regular municipality of the province of Málaga.

Melilla is one of the special territories of the member states of the European Union. Movements to and from the rest of the EU and Melilla are subject to specific rules, provided for in the Accession Agreement of Spain to the Schengen Convention. It has a small airport and its port is connnected to the ports of Málaga, Motril, and Almería via ferry. Its population of 87,067 is chiefly divided between people of Iberian and Riffian extraction. There are also small numbers of Sephardic Jews and Sindhi Hindus. Melilla features a diglossia between the official Spanish and Tarifit. Like the autonomous city of Ceuta and Spain's other territories along the northern African coast, Melilla is subject to an irredentist claim by Morocco.

== Name ==
Borrowed from Spanish, the English name Melilla is pronounced /mɛˈliːjə/ or /məˈliːjə/ to approximate the sound of the Spanish double L, properly [meˈliʝa] in most standard Spanish dialects. The name is attested from the 9th century, deriving from Arabic Malīlya (مَلِيلْيَة, [maˈliːlja]) possibly of Riffian Berber origin. It could come from the Amazigh root M·L·L (meaning 'white'), producing the Amazigh "mlilet" or "Amlal", from which the name was subsequently adopted into Arabic as Malīlya. It would share then a similar etymology with Beni Mellal in the Atlas Mountains. In local Tarifit, the name developed into "Mřič" (Tarifit pronunciation: [mɾɪt͡ʃ]) through the sound changes /l/ → [ɾ] and /lt/ → [t͡ʃ]. The name might also be related to honey (Spanish: miel; Latin: mel; Ancient Greek: μέλι, méli) since Melilla was a notable site for beekeeping in antiquity, a bee appearing prominently on the city's bronze coinage under Mauretanian rule.

== History ==
=== Antiquity and Middle Ages ===
Melilla was a Phoenician and later Punic trade establishment under variations of the name Rusadir (Punic: 𐤓𐤔𐤀𐤃𐤓, ršʾdr), taken from the Phoenician name of the nearby Cape Three Forks. After Carthage's defeat in the Punic Wars, the city fell under the control of the Roman client state Mauretania. After its annexation under Caligula, Claudius organized it as part of the province of Mauretania Tingitana. Pliny mentions it as a native hillfort and port (Latin: oppidum et portus). It was made a Roman colony in AD 46, after which it was sometimes referenced as Flavia. Rusadir was said to have once been the seat of a bishop, but there is no record of any bishop of the purported see, and it is not included in the Catholic Church's list of modern titular sees.

The political history is similar to that of towns in the region of the Moroccan Rif and southern Spain. Melilla was progressively ruled by the Vandals, Byzantines, and the Visigoths. In the early 6th century, it was the main port of the Mauro-Roman Kingdom. After the Islamic conquest of North Africa, it fell under the Umayyads, Cordobans, Idrisids, Almoravids, Almohads, Marinids, and Wattasids.

=== Early Modern period ===
During the 15th century, the city declined, like most Mediterranean cities of the Kingdom of Fez, eclipsed by those on the Atlantic. After the Catholic Monarchs' conquest of the Nasrid Kingdom of Granada in 1492, their Secretary Hernando de Zafra gathered intelligence about the sorry state of the North African coast with territorial expansion in mind. He sent agents to investigate, and subsequently reported to the Catholic Monarchs that, as of 1494, locals had expelled the authority of the Sultan of Fez and had offered to pledge loyalty. While the 1494 Treaty of Tordesillas put Melilla and Cazaza, until then reserved to the Portuguese, under the sphere of Castile, the conquest of the city had to wait, delayed by the French occupation of Naples.

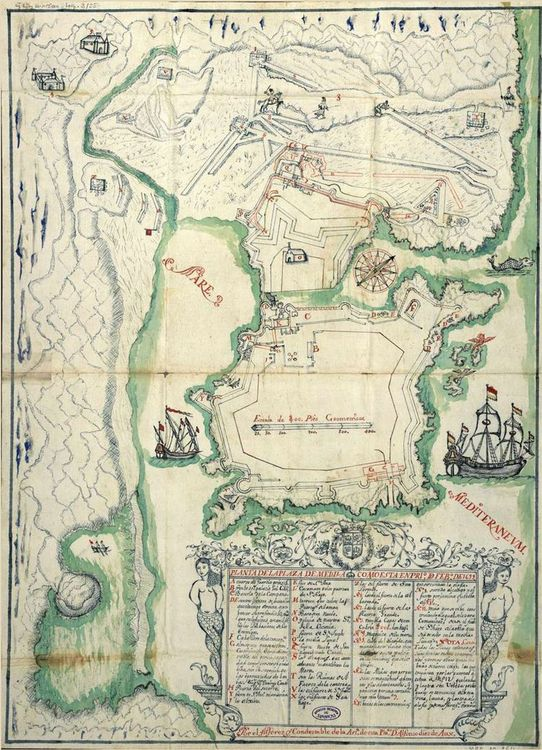
Map of the Melilla fortress by the late 17th-century.

The Duke of Medina Sidonia, Juan Alfonso Pérez de Guzmán, advocated seizing Melilla, to be headed by Pedro de Estopiñán, and the Catholic Monarchs, Isabella I of Castile and Ferdinand II of Aragon, endorsed the initiative and provided the assistance of artillery officer Francisco Ramírez de Madrid. Melilla was occupied on 17 September 1497, virtually without violence as it was on the border between the Kingdom of Tlemcen and the Kingdom of Fez, and as a result had been fought over many times and left abandoned. No large-scale expansion into the Kingdom of Fez ensued, barring the enterprises of the Cardinal Cisneros along the Algerian coast in Mers El Kébir and Oran, and the rock of Badis in the territorial scope of the Kingdom of Fez. The Hispanic monarchy's imperial impetus was eventually directed elsewhere to the Italian Wars against France, and, especially after 1519, to the newly discovered continent across the Atlantic.

Melilla was initially jointly administered by the House of Medina Sidonia and the Crown, and a 1498 settlement required the former to station a 700-man garrison in Melilla and the latter to provide the city with a number of maravedíes and wheat fanegas. The Crown's interest in Melilla decreased during the reign of Charles V. During the 16th century, soldiers stationed in Melilla were badly remunerated, leading to many desertions. The Duke of Medina Sidonia relinquished responsibility over the garrison of the place on 7 June 1556.

During the late 17th century, Alaouite sultan Ismail Ibn Sharif attempted to conquer the presidio, taking the outer fortifications in the 1680s and further unsuccessfully besieging Melilla in the 1690s.

One Spanish officer reflected, "an hour in Melilla, from the point of view of merit, was worth more than thirty years of service to Spain."

=== Late Modern period ===
The current limits of the Spanish territory around the Melilla fortress were fixed by treaties with Morocco in 1859, 1860, 1861, and 1894. In the late 19th century, as Spanish influence expanded in this area, the Crown authorized Melilla as the only centre of trade on the Rif coast between Tetuan and the Algerian border. The value of trade increased, with goat skins, eggs and beeswax the principal exports, and cotton goods, tea, sugar and candles the chief imports.

Melilla's civil population in 1860 still amounted to only 375 estimated inhabitants. In a 1866 Hispano-Moroccan arrangement signed in Fes, both parties agreed to allow for the installment of a customs office near the border with Melilla, to be operated by Moroccan officials. The Treaty of Peace with Morocco that followed the 1859–60 War entailed the acquisition of a new perimeter for Melilla, bringing its area to that where the 12 km^{2} the autonomous city currently stands. Following the declaration of Melilla as a free port in 1863, the population began to increase, chiefly with Sephardi Jews fleeing from Tetouan who fostered trade in and out of the city. The first Jews from Tetouan probably arrived in 1864, and the first rabbi arrived in 1867 and began to operate the first synagogue, located in the Calle de San Miguel. Many Jews arrived fleeing from persecution in Morocco instigated by Roghi Bu Hamara. Following the 1868 lifting of the veto of emigration to Melilla from Peninsular Spain, the population further increased with Spaniards. The Jewish population, who also progressively acquired Spanish citizenship, increased to 572 in 1893. The economic opportunities created in Melilla henceforth favoured the installment of a Berber population.

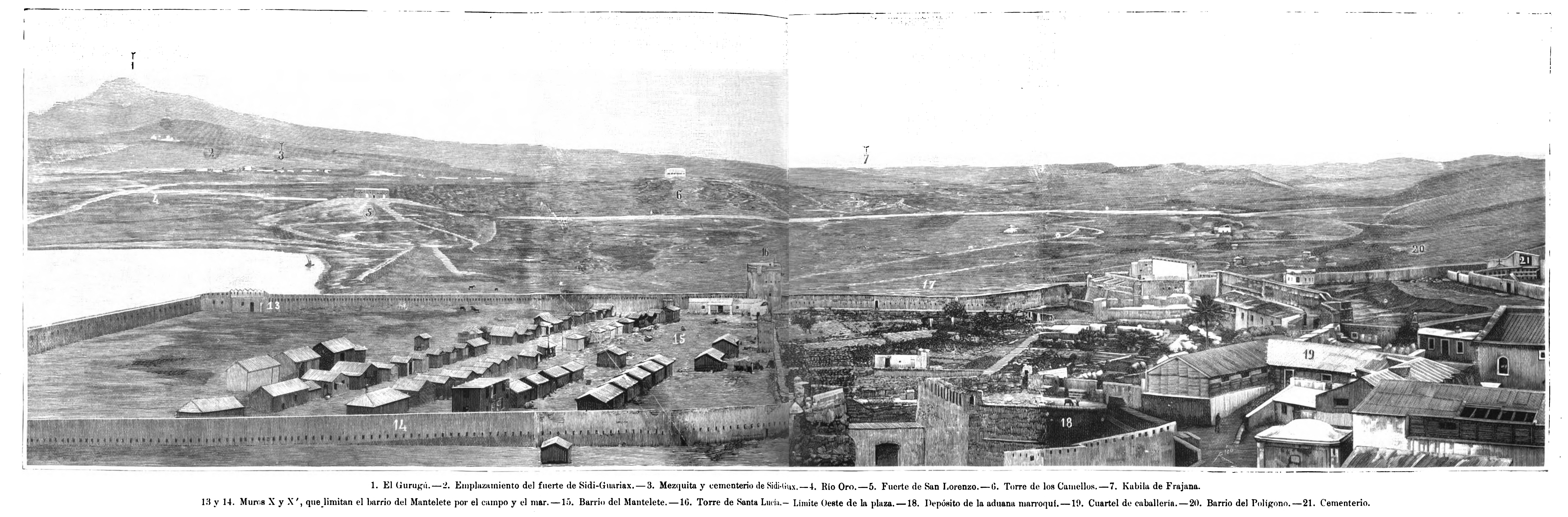

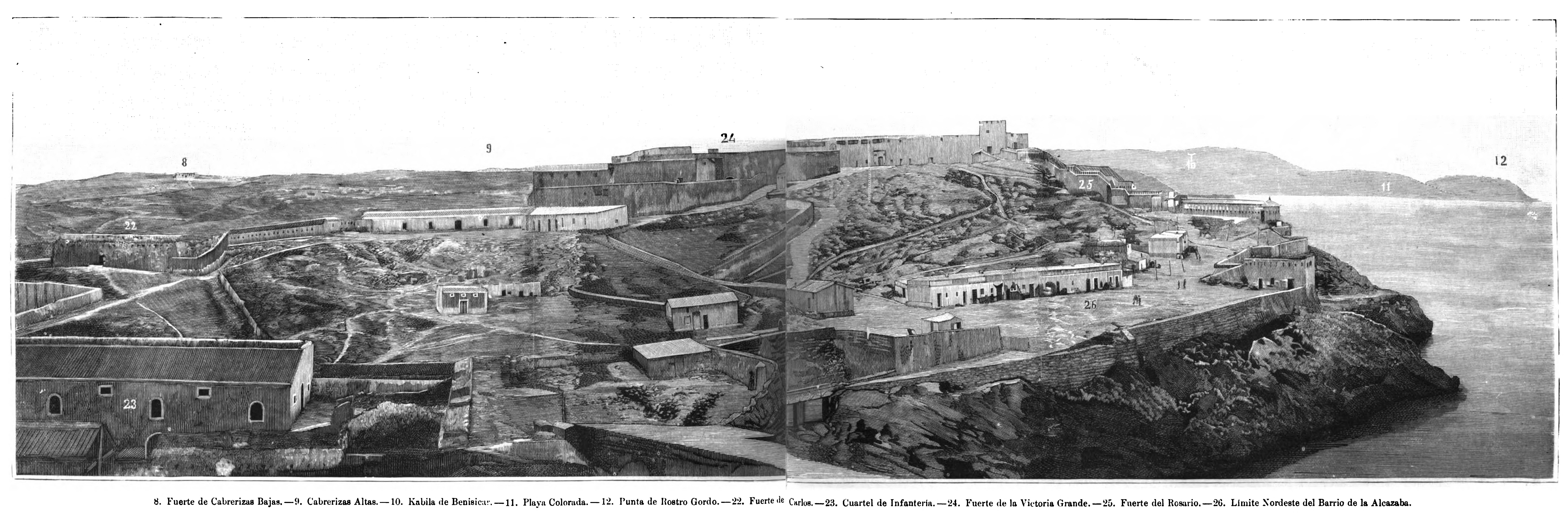

The first body of local government was the junta de arbitrios created in 1879, in which the military enjoy preponderance. The Polígono excepcional de Tiro, the first neighborhood outside the walled core (Melilla la Vieja), began construction in 1888.

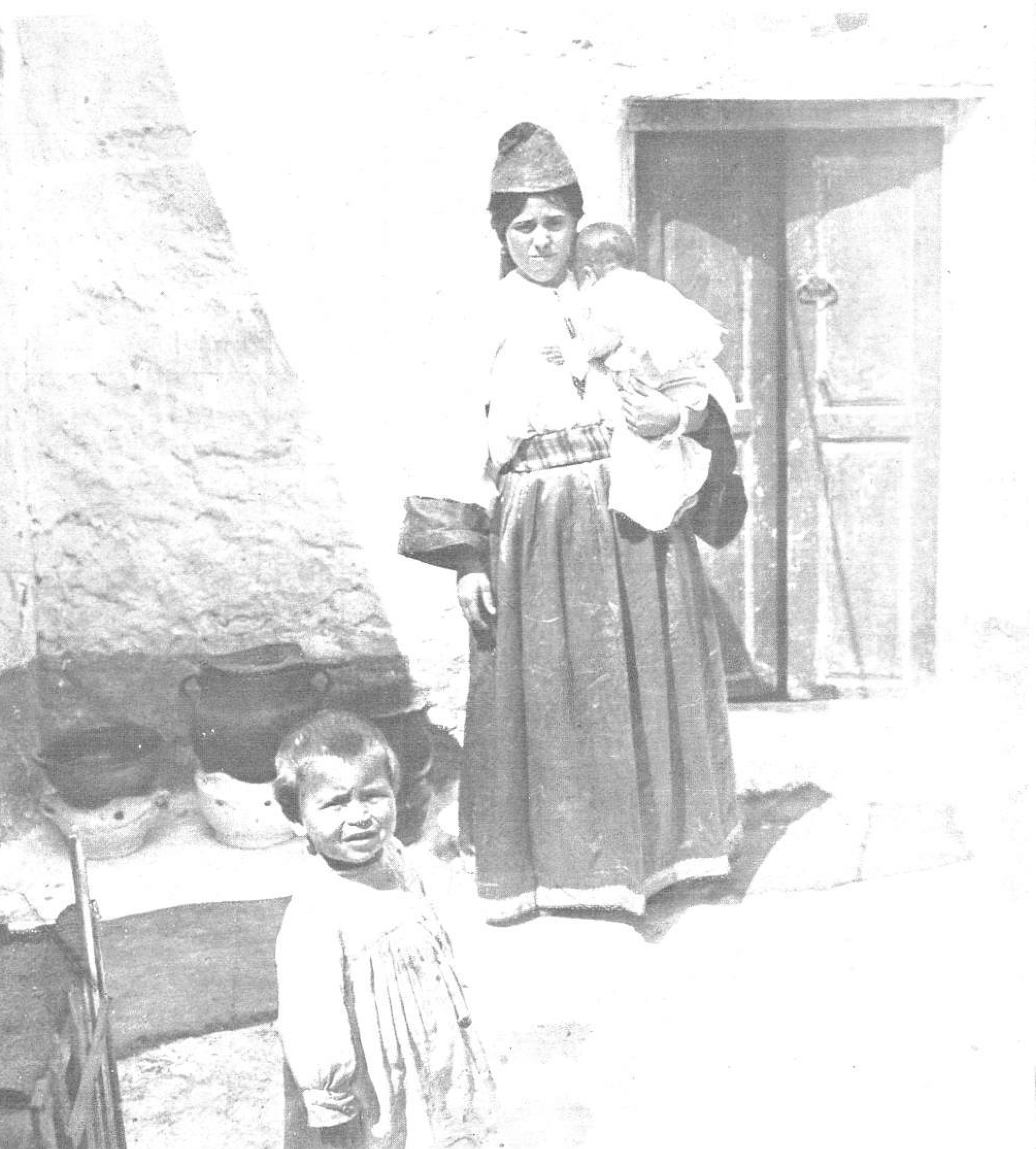
Jewish woman in the Jewish quarter (1909)

In 1893, Riffian tribesmen launched the First Melillan campaign to try to conquer the city; the Spanish government sent 25,000 soldiers to defend it against them. The conflict was also known as the Margallo War, after Spanish General Juan García y Margallo, Governor of Melilla, who was killed in the battle. The new 1894 agreement with Morocco that followed the conflict increased trade with the hinterland, bringing the economic prosperity of the city to a new level. The total population of Melilla amounted to 10,004 inhabitants in 1896.

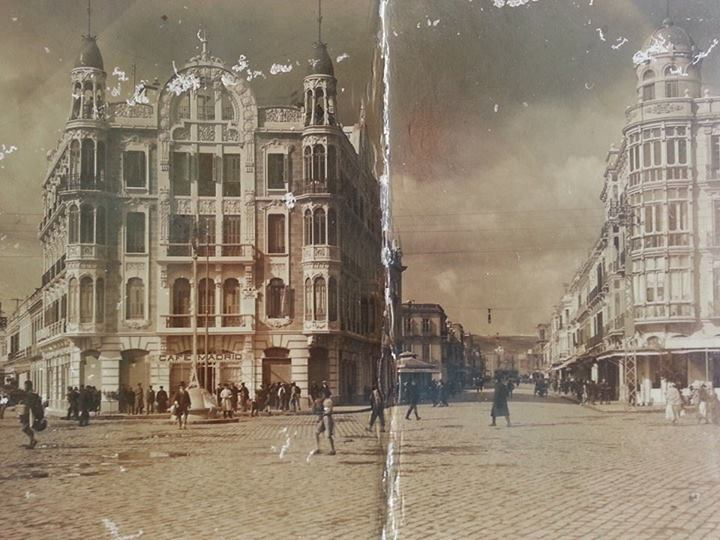
Art Nouveau buildings in the Plaza de España (c. 1917)

The turn of the new century saw attempts by France (based in French Algeria) to profit from their newly acquired sphere of influence in Morocco to counter Melilla's trading prowess by fostering trade links with the Algerian cities of Ghazaouet and Oran. Melilla began to suffer from this, to which the instability brought by revolts against Muley Abdel Aziz in the hinterland also added, although after 1905 Sultan pretender El Rogui (Bou Hmara) carried out a defusing policy in the area that favoured Spain. The French occupation of Oujda in 1907 compromised the Melillan trade with that city, and the enduring instability in the Rif still threatened Melilla. Between 1909 and 1945, the modernista (Art Nouveau) style was prevalent in local architecture, making Melilla's streets a "true museum of modernista-style architecture", second only to Barcelona, mainly stemming from the work of architect Enrique Nieto.

Mining companies began to enter the hinterland of Melilla by 1908. A Spanish company, the Compañía Española de las Minas del Rif, was constituted in July 1908, shared by Clemente Fernández, Enrique Macpherson, the Count of Romanones, the Duke of Tovar and Juan Antonio Güell, who appointed Miguel Villanueva as chairman. Thus two mining companies under the protection of Bou Hmara started mining lead and iron 20 kilometers (12.4 miles) from Melilla. They started to construct a railway between the port and the mines. In October of that year, Bou Hmara's vassals revolted against him and raided the mines, which remained closed until June 1909. By July the workmen were again attacked and several were killed. Severe fighting between the Spaniards and the tribesmen followed, in the Second Melillan campaign that took place in the vicinity of Melilla.

In 1910, the Spaniards restarted the mines and undertook harbor works at Mar Chica, but hostilities broke out again in 1911. On 22 July 1921, the Berbers under the leadership of Abd el Krim inflicted a grave defeat on the Spanish at the Battle of Annual. The Spanish retreated to Melilla, leaving most of the protectorate under the control of the Republic of the Rif.

A royal decree pursuing the creation of an ayuntamiento in Melilla was signed on 13 December 1918 but the regulation did not come into force, and thus the existing government body, the junta de arbitrios, remained in force.

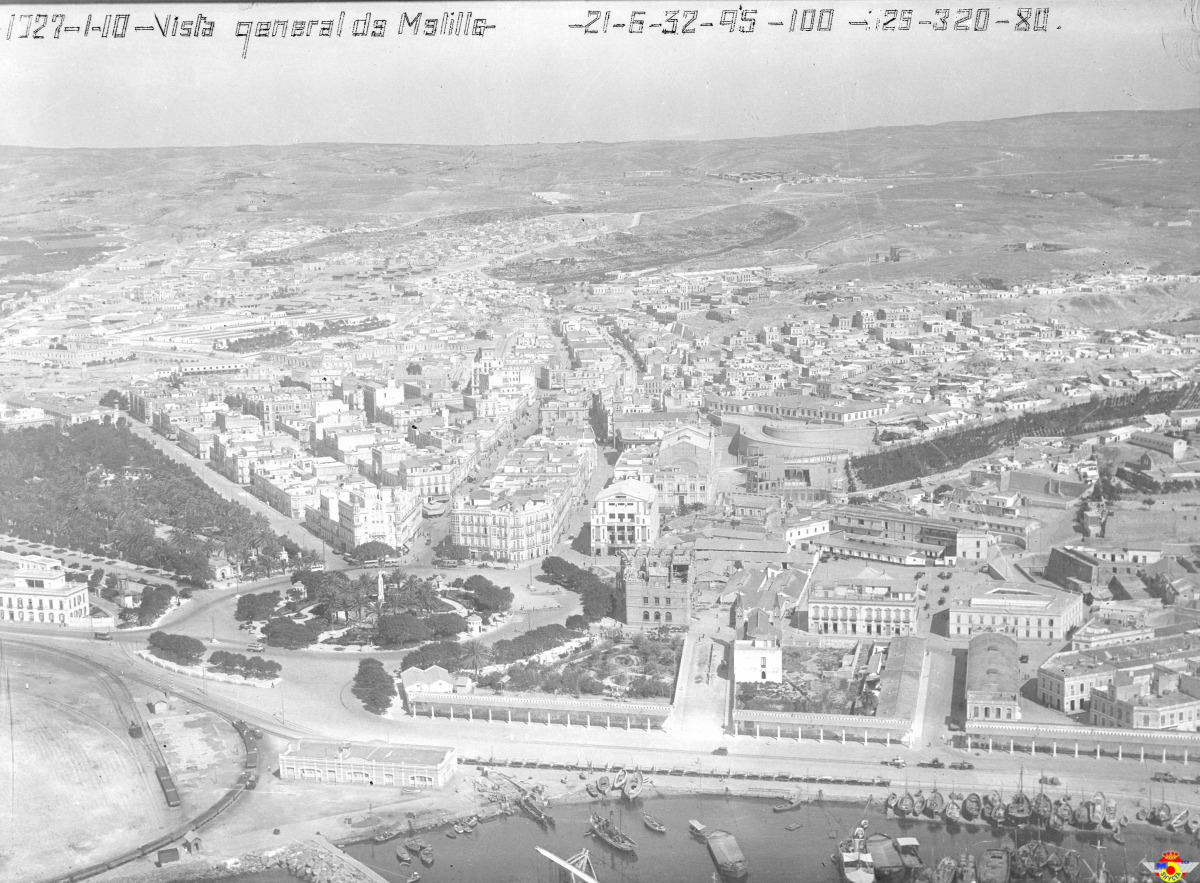
City centre in 1926

A "junta municipal" with a rather civil composition was created in 1927; on 10 April 1930, an ayuntamiento featuring the same membership as the junta was created, equalling to the same municipal regime as the rest of Spain on 14 April 1931, with the arrival of the first democratically elected municipal corporation on the wake of the proclamation of the Second Republic.

The city was used as one of the staging grounds for the July 1936 military coup d'état that started the Spanish Civil War.

Following the Morocco's independence in 1956, the Moroccan government nationalised both the Rif mines and railroads and, although it did not stop outright, the export of iron ore through Melilla's port decreased.

In the context of the passing of the Ley de Extranjería in 1986, and following social mobilization from the Berber community, conditions for citizenship acquisition were flexibilised and allowed for the naturalisation of a substantial number of inhabitants, until then born in Melilla but without Spanish citizenship.

=== Autonomy and late 20th, 21st century ===
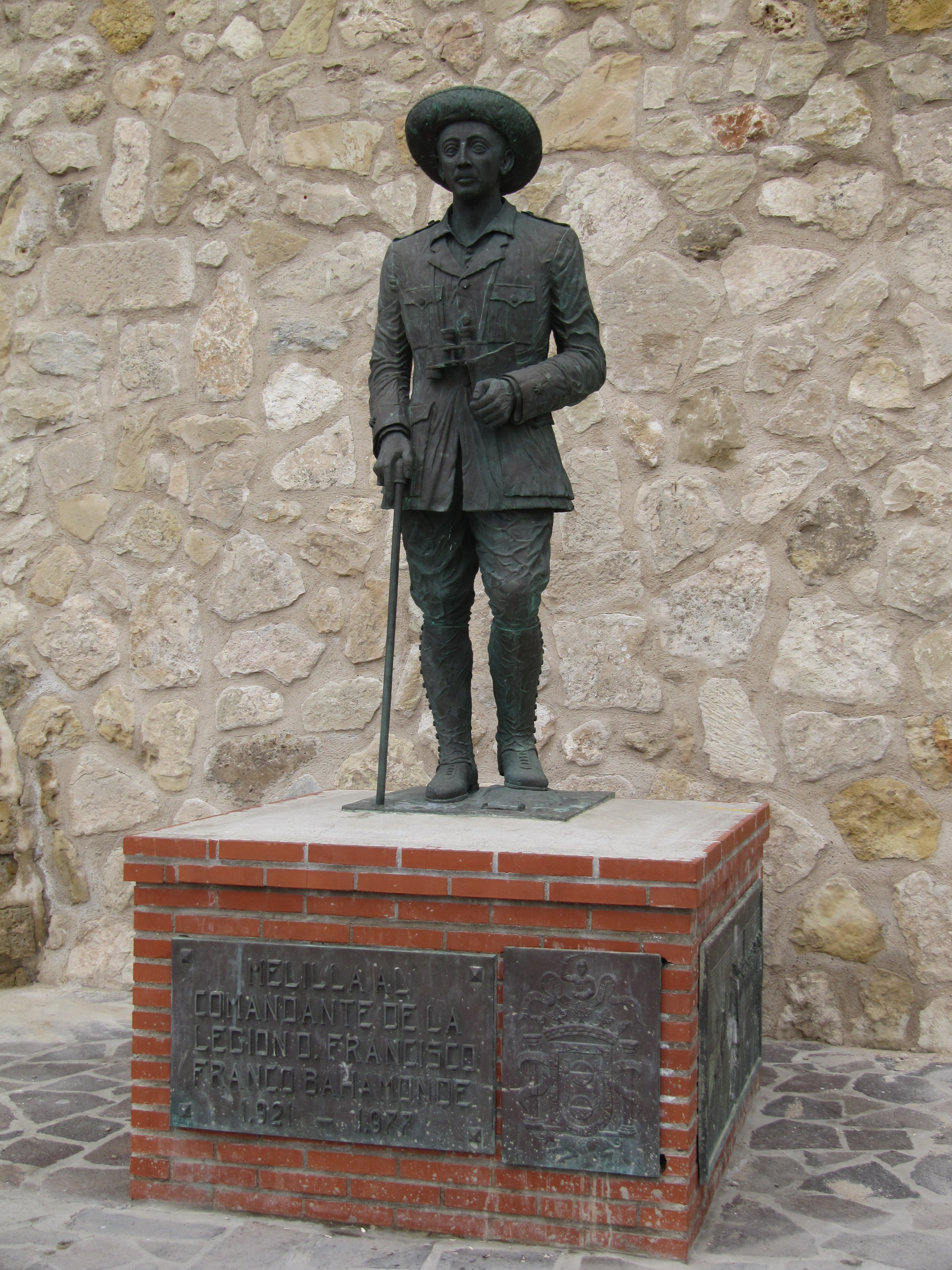
Statue of Francisco Franco in Melilla, removed in 2021.

In 1995, Melilla —until then just another municipality of Málaga— became an autonomous city, as their Statute of Autonomy was passed.

On 6 November 2007, King Juan Carlos and Queen Sofía visited Melilla and Ceuta, sparking enthusiasm from the local population and protests from the Moroccan government, which led to a brief diplomatic conflict. It was the first time a Spanish head of state had visited the two African exclaves since 1927.

Melilla, together with Ceuta, declared the Muslim holiday of Eid al-Adha —Feast of the Sacrifice— an official public holiday from 2010 onward. It is the first time a non-Christian religious festival has been officially celebrated in Spain since the Reconquista.

In 2018, Morocco decided to close the customs office near Melilla, the first time since mid-19th century, without any consultation with Spain. The customs office was expected to reopen in January 2023. As of February 2025, trade was still tentative and limited.

Melilla was the location of the last public statue in Spain to commemorate former dictator Francisco Franco following Spain's Historical Memory Law, passed in 2007, which included provision to the removal of any artefacts which celebrated the Franco regime from all public buildings and spaces. Nonetheless, the statue remained on the Cuesta de la Florentina street until its final removal in 2021.

== Geography ==
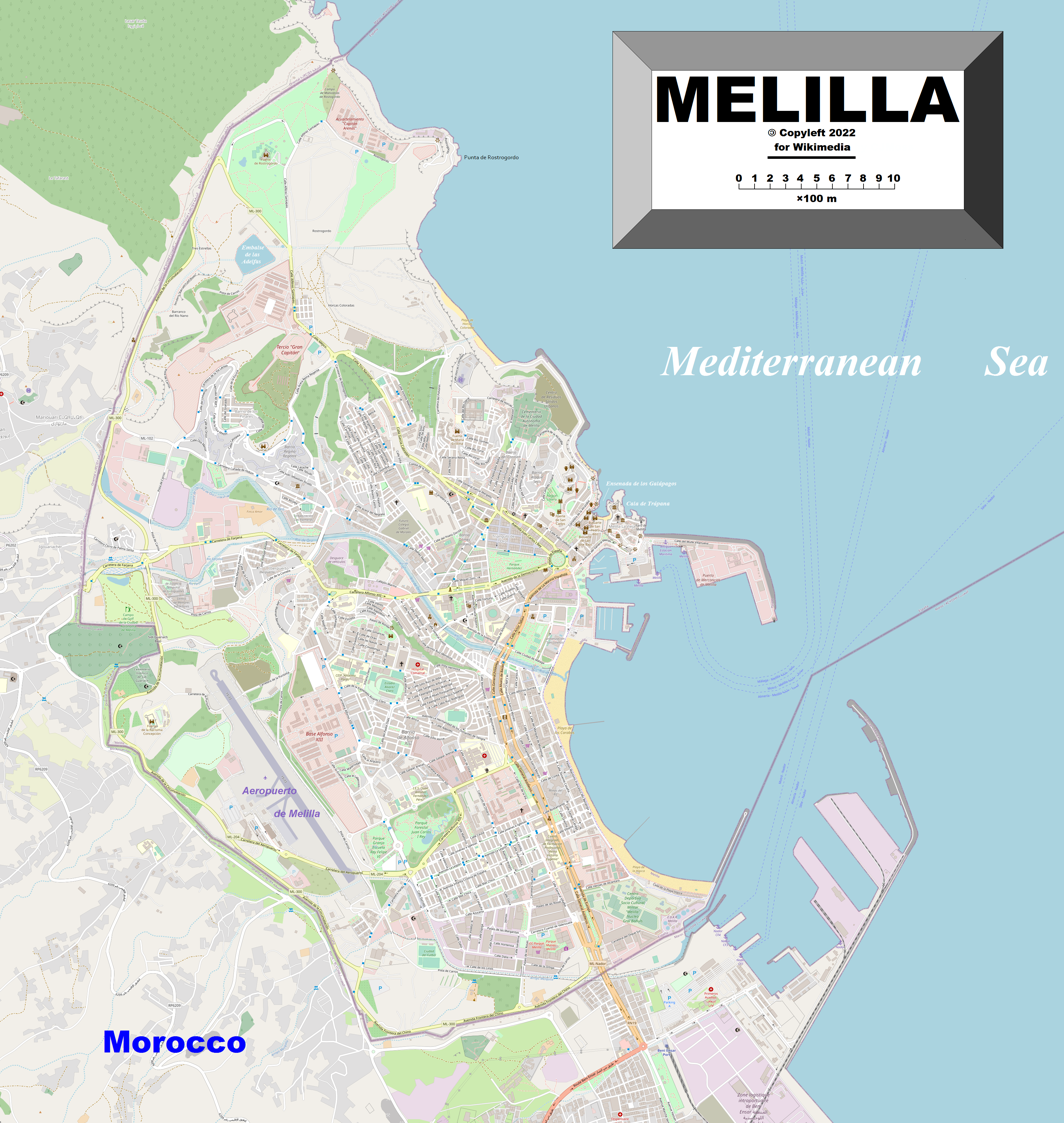
Detailed map of Melilla.

=== Location ===
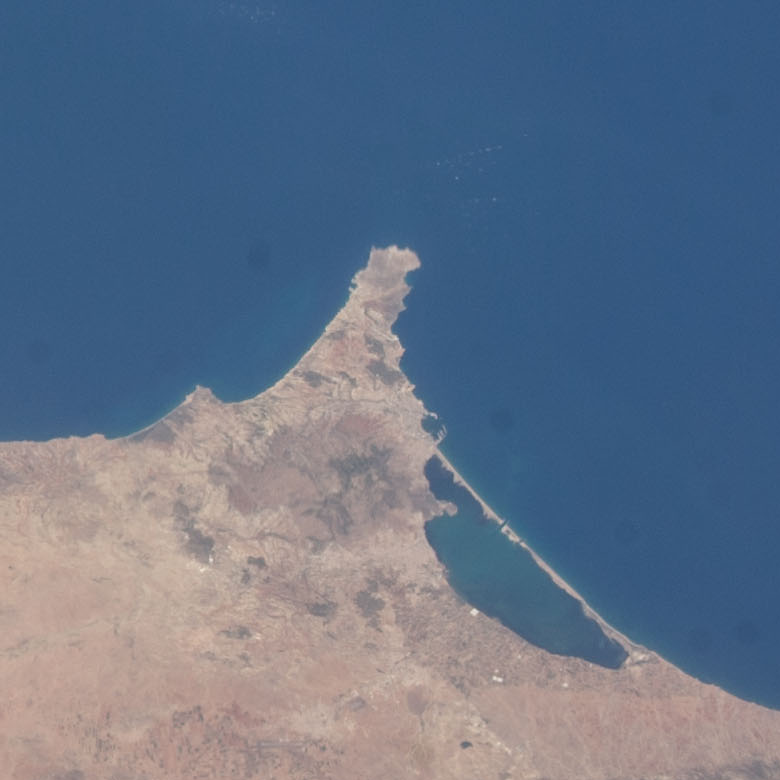
Detail of a satellite photograph of Cape Three Forks (centred on Melilla) taken during the 2013 ISS-36 expedition.

Melilla is in northwest Africa, on the shores of the Alboran Sea, a marginal sea of the Mediterranean, the latter's westernmost portion. The city is arranged in a wide semicircle around the beach and the Port of Melilla, on the eastern side of the peninsula of Cape Tres Forcas, at the foot of Mount Gurugú and around the mouth of the Río de Oro intermittent water stream, 1 meter (3 ft 3 in) above sea level. The urban nucleus was originally a fortress, Melilla la Vieja, built on a peninsular mound about 30 meters (98 ft) in height.

The Moroccan settlement of Beni Ansar lies immediately south of Melilla. The nearest Moroccan city is Nador, and the ports of Melilla and Nador are within the same bay; nearby is the Bou Areg Lagoon.

=== Climate ===
Melilla has a hot Mediterranean climate on the border with a hot Semi-arid climate, influenced by its proximity to the sea, rendering much cooler summers and more precipitation than inland areas deeper into Africa. The climate, in general, is similar to the southern coast of peninsular Spain and the northern coast of Morocco, with relatively small temperature differences between seasons. Minimum temperatures have never been below 0 °C (32 °F) during 1991–2020 period, and only 2.2 days per year have maximum temperature above 35 °C (95 °F).

Climate data for Melilla, altitude: 52 m (1991–2020)
Month	Jan	Feb	Mar	Apr	May	Jun	Jul	Aug	Sep	Oct	Nov	Dec	Year
Record high °C (°F)	27.0 (80.6)	34.2 (93.6)	29.6 (85.3)	30.6 (87.1)	33.0 (91.4)	37.0 (98.6)	41.8 (107.2)	40.0 (104.0)	36.0 (96.8)	35.0 (95.0)	34.0 (93.2)	30.6 (87.1)	41.8 (107.2)
Mean maximum °C (°F)	21.5 (70.7)	22.0 (71.6)	23.8 (74.8)	25.2 (77.4)	28.9 (84.0)	31.4 (88.5)	35.6 (96.1)	35.0 (95.0)	31.7 (89.1)	29.0 (84.2)	26.3 (79.3)	22.4 (72.3)	36.5 (97.7)
Mean daily maximum °C (°F)	16.9 (62.4)	17.1 (62.8)	18.5 (65.3)	20.2 (68.4)	22.9 (73.2)	26.0 (78.8)	29.0 (84.2)	29.6 (85.3)	27.0 (80.6)	23.8 (74.8)	20.2 (68.4)	17.8 (64.0)	22.4 (72.3)
Daily mean °C (°F)	13.6 (56.5)	13.9 (57.0)	15.3 (59.5)	16.9 (62.4)	19.6 (67.3)	22.7 (72.9)	25.6 (78.1)	26.3 (79.3)	23.8 (74.8)	20.6 (69.1)	17.0 (62.6)	14.6 (58.3)	19.2 (66.6)
Mean daily minimum °C (°F)	10.3 (50.5)	10.8 (51.4)	12.1 (53.8)	13.6 (56.5)	16.3 (61.3)	19.4 (66.9)	22.2 (72.0)	23.1 (73.6)	20.7 (69.3)	17.4 (63.3)	13.8 (56.8)	11.4 (52.5)	15.9 (60.6)
Mean minimum °C (°F)	6.2 (43.2)	6.9 (44.4)	7.8 (46.0)	9.9 (49.8)	12.0 (53.6)	15.8 (60.4)	19.0 (66.2)	20.1 (68.2)	17.2 (63.0)	13.3 (55.9)	9.3 (48.7)	7.4 (45.3)	5.6 (42.1)
Record low °C (°F)	0.4 (32.7)	2.8 (37.0)	3.4 (38.1)	6.0 (42.8)	9.4 (48.9)	12.4 (54.3)	16.0 (60.8)	14.6 (58.3)	13.6 (56.5)	9.4 (48.9)	5.0 (41.0)	4.0 (39.2)	0.4 (32.7)
Average precipitation mm (inches)	55.3 (2.18)	48.2 (1.90)	43.6 (1.72)	37.7 (1.48)	15.2 (0.60)	7.2 (0.28)	0.5 (0.02)	3.8 (0.15)	18.9 (0.74)	42.6 (1.68)	53.3 (2.10)	48.2 (1.90)	374.5 (14.75)
Average precipitation days (≥ 1.0 mm)	6.1	5.0	4.9	4.5	2.3	0.6	0.2	0.8	2.6	4.7	5.7	5.6	43
Average relative humidity (%)	73.1	72.9	72.8	70.8	68.5	68	67	69.8	73.6	75.7	74.5	74.4	71.8
Mean monthly sunshine hours	188.9	184.8	203.3	226.2	269.9	295.7	304.2	278.6	220.1	203.4	183	176	2,734.1
Source 1: NCEI, Météo Climat
Source 2: Infoclimat

Climate data for Melilla 47 m (1981–2010)
Month	Jan	Feb	Mar	Apr	May	Jun	Jul	Aug	Sep	Oct	Nov	Dec	Year
Record high °C (°F)	27.0 (80.6)	34.2 (93.6)	29.6 (85.3)	30.6 (87.1)	33.0 (91.4)	37.0 (98.6)	41.8 (107.2)	40.0 (104.0)	36.0 (96.8)	35.0 (95.0)	34.0 (93.2)	30.6 (87.1)	41.8 (107.2)
Mean daily maximum °C (°F)	16.7 (62.1)	17.0 (62.6)	18.5 (65.3)	20.1 (68.2)	22.5 (72.5)	25.8 (78.4)	28.9 (84.0)	29.4 (84.9)	27.1 (80.8)	23.7 (74.7)	20.3 (68.5)	17.8 (64.0)	22.3 (72.1)
Daily mean °C (°F)	13.3 (55.9)	13.8 (56.8)	15.2 (59.4)	16.6 (61.9)	19.1 (66.4)	22.4 (72.3)	25.3 (77.5)	25.9 (78.6)	23.8 (74.8)	20.4 (68.7)	17.0 (62.6)	14.6 (58.3)	18.9 (66.0)
Mean daily minimum °C (°F)	9.9 (49.8)	10.6 (51.1)	11.9 (53.4)	13.2 (55.8)	15.7 (60.3)	19.0 (66.2)	21.7 (71.1)	22.4 (72.3)	20.5 (68.9)	17.2 (63.0)	13.7 (56.7)	11.2 (52.2)	15.6 (60.1)
Record low °C (°F)	0.4 (32.7)	2.8 (37.0)	3.4 (38.1)	6.0 (42.8)	9.4 (48.9)	12.4 (54.3)	16.0 (60.8)	14.6 (58.3)	13.6 (56.5)	9.4 (48.9)	5.0 (41.0)	4.0 (39.2)	0.4 (32.7)
Average precipitation mm (inches)	58 (2.3)	57 (2.2)	44 (1.7)	36 (1.4)	20 (0.8)	7 (0.3)	1 (0.0)	4 (0.2)	16 (0.6)	40 (1.6)	57 (2.2)	50 (2.0)	391 (15.4)
Average precipitation days (≥ 1.0 mm)	6.3	5.5	4.6	4.6	2.8	0.7	0.3	0.8	2.2	3.9	5.8	5.7	43.2
Average snowy days	0.1	0	0	0	0	0	0	0	0	0	0	0	0.1
Average relative humidity (%)	72	74	73	69	67	67	66	69	72	75	74	73	71
Mean monthly sunshine hours	184	170	192	220	258	279	289	268	210	194	176	168	2,607
Source: Agencia Estatal de Meteorología

== Demographics ==
Melilla population pyramid in 2022

Historical population
Year	Pop.	±%
1877	1,009	—
1887	5,432	+438.4%
1900	10,182	+87.4%
1910	40,929	+302.0%
1920	53,577	+30.9%
1930	69,133	+29.0%
1940	69,684	+0.8%
1950	76,247	+9.4%
1960	72,430	−5.0%
1970	60,843	−16.0%
1981	53,593	−11.9%
1991	63,670	+18.8%
2001	66,411	+4.3%
2011	81,323	+22.5%
2021	86,450	+6.3%
Source: INE

As of 2025, the population is 87,067, of which 50.3% are males, and 49.7% are females. Minors make up 23.8% of the population, and seniors make up 12.7%.

=== Religion ===
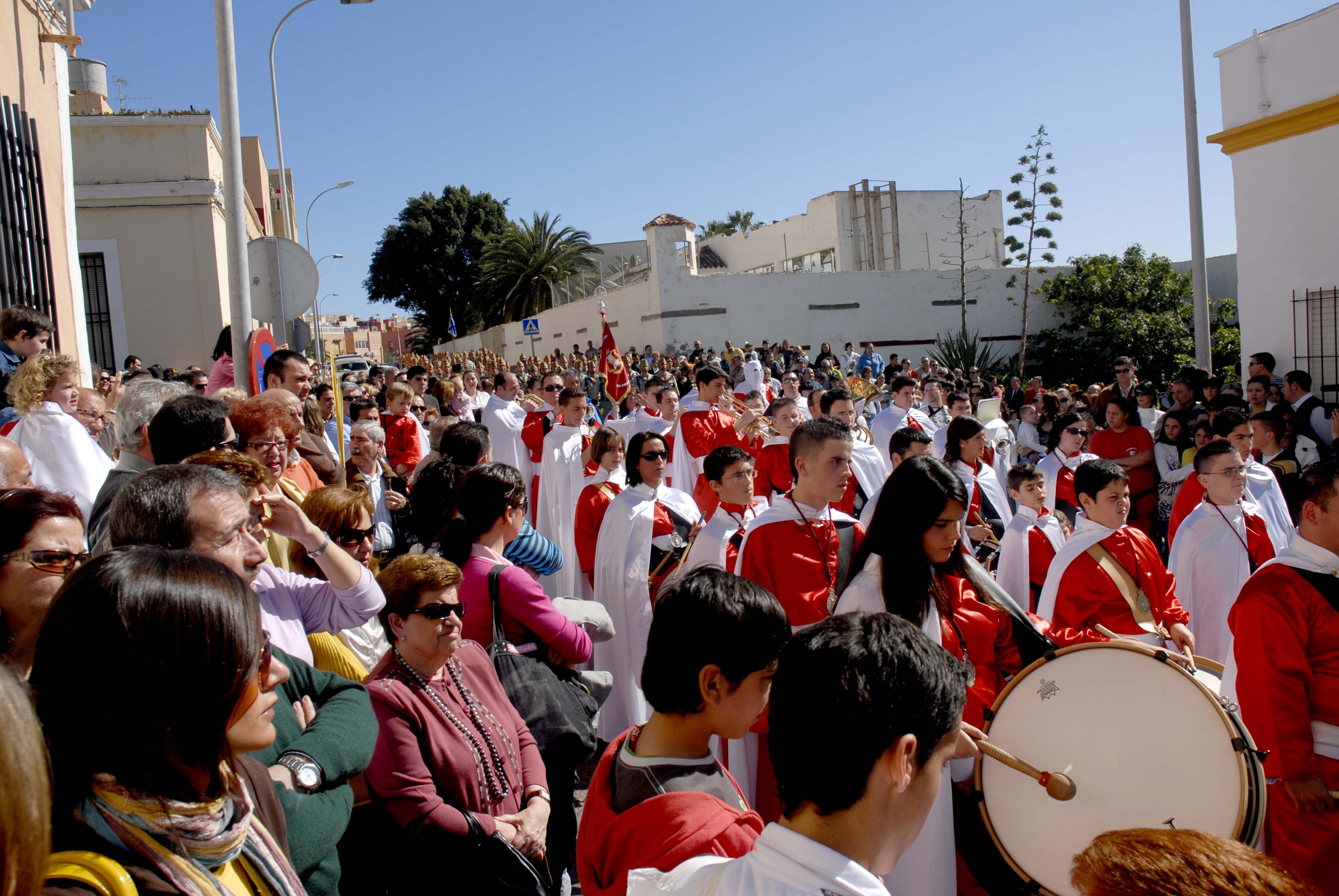
Holy Week procession in Melilla

Melilla has been praised as an example of multiculturalism, being a small city in which one can find Christians, Muslims, Hindus, Buddhists and Jews represented.

==== Judaism ====
Percentagewise, Melilla may be the most Jewish city in Spain with around 1,000 Jews living in the city, down from 7,000 around the year 1930. This is mainly due to economic reasons, as a result of moving to the Spanish mainland, Israel or Venezuela. Melilla plays an important part in the history of Jews in Spain, having been exempt from the expulsion of Jews from Spain. The expelled Spanish Jews were Sephardic Jews and subsequently found a new home in neighboring Morocco, including Melilla. Especially during the second half of the 19th century, many of the expelled Sephardic Jews moved from northern Morocco to Melilla. The first ones were traders from the Moroccan cities who came for economic and safety reasons. Later, impoverished Jews from the rural Riffian areas joined, also due to safety reasons. Melilla's special geographical and political situation has made the city the oldest, and one of the most important centers of Sephardic Judaism in today's Spain, traditional home of the Sephards.

In 2026, Melilla's government granted €40,000 to its Jewish community for cultural activities and synagogue maintenance. This was part of the "Route of the Temples" initiative of the city.

==== Christianity ====
According to the Spanish Center for Sociological Research, Roman Catholicism is the largest religion in Melilla. In 2019, the proportion of Melillans that identify themselves as Roman Catholic was 65.0% (31.7% define themselves as not practising, while 33.3% as practising). 30% identify as followers of other faiths, 2.7% identify as non-believers, and 2.3% identify as atheists.

The Roman Catholic churches in Melilla belong to the Diocese of Málaga.

==== Islam ====
Some sources indicate that Muslims account for roughly half the population in Melilla, which is in conflict with the Spanish Center for Sociological Research reported numbers. According to an estimate by Professor Johanna M. Lems, based on 2020 data from Spain's National Institute of Statistics and the Observatorio Andalusí, Muslims represent the majority or 53.2% of the Melillan population of 84,496 as of January 2020.

==== Hinduism ====
There is a small, autonomous, and commercially important Hindu community present in Melilla, which has fallen over the past decades as its members move to the Spanish mainland. It numbers about 100 members today.

=== Language ===
Melilla features a diglossia, with Spanish as the first and official language and Tarifit as the second language, with limited written codification, and usage restricted to family and domestic relations and oral speech.

The population can be thus divided into monolingual Spanish speakers of European ethnic origin; those descended from Tamazight-speaking parents, usually bilingual in Spanish and Tamazight; and Moroccan immigrants and cross-border workers, with a generally dominant Tamazight language (with some also competent in Arabic) and a L2 competence in Spanish. The Spanish spoken in Melilla is similar to the Andalusian variety from Cádiz, whereas the Berber variant spoken in Melilla is the Tarifit, common with the neighbouring Nador area. Rather than Berber (Spanish: bereber), Berber speakers in Melilla use either the glotonym Tmaziɣt, or, in Spanish, cherja for their language.

The first attempt to legislate a degree of recognition for Berber in Melilla was in 1994, in the context of the elaboration of the Statute of Autonomy, by mentioning the promotion of the linguistic and cultural pluralism (without explicitly mentioning the Berber language). The initiative went nowhere, voted down by PP and PSOE. Reasons cited for not recognizing Tamazight are related to the argument that the variety is not standardized.

=== Immigration ===
Foreign population by country of birth (2025)
Country of birth	Population
Morocco	18,462
Colombia	668
Venezuela	416
Germany	206
France	164
Argentina	114
Peru	110
Belgium	109
Netherlands	102
Cuba	85
China	58
Ecuador	55
United Kingdom	53
Algeria	48
Brazil	47

As of 2025, immigrants make up 24.6% of the population. The five largest foreign countries of birth are Morocco, making up 86.3% of the immigrant population, followed by Colombia, Venezuela, Germany, and France.

== Architecture ==
The dome of the Chapel of Santiago, built in the mid-16th century by Miguel de Perea with help from Sancho de Escalante, is a rare instance of Gothic architecture in the African continent.

Parallel to the urban development of Melilla in the early 20th century, the new architectural style of modernismo (irradiated from Barcelona and associated to the bourgeois class) was imported to the city, granting it a modernista architectural character, primarily through the works of the prolific Catalan architect Enrique Nieto.

Accordingly, Melilla has the second most important concentration of Modernista works in Spain after Barcelona, Mainly concentrated in the city's ensanche. Nieto was in charge of designing the main Synagogue, the Central Mosque and various Catholic Churches.

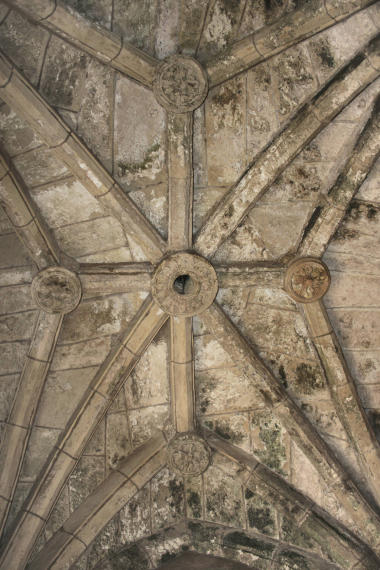
Dome of the Chapel of Santiago

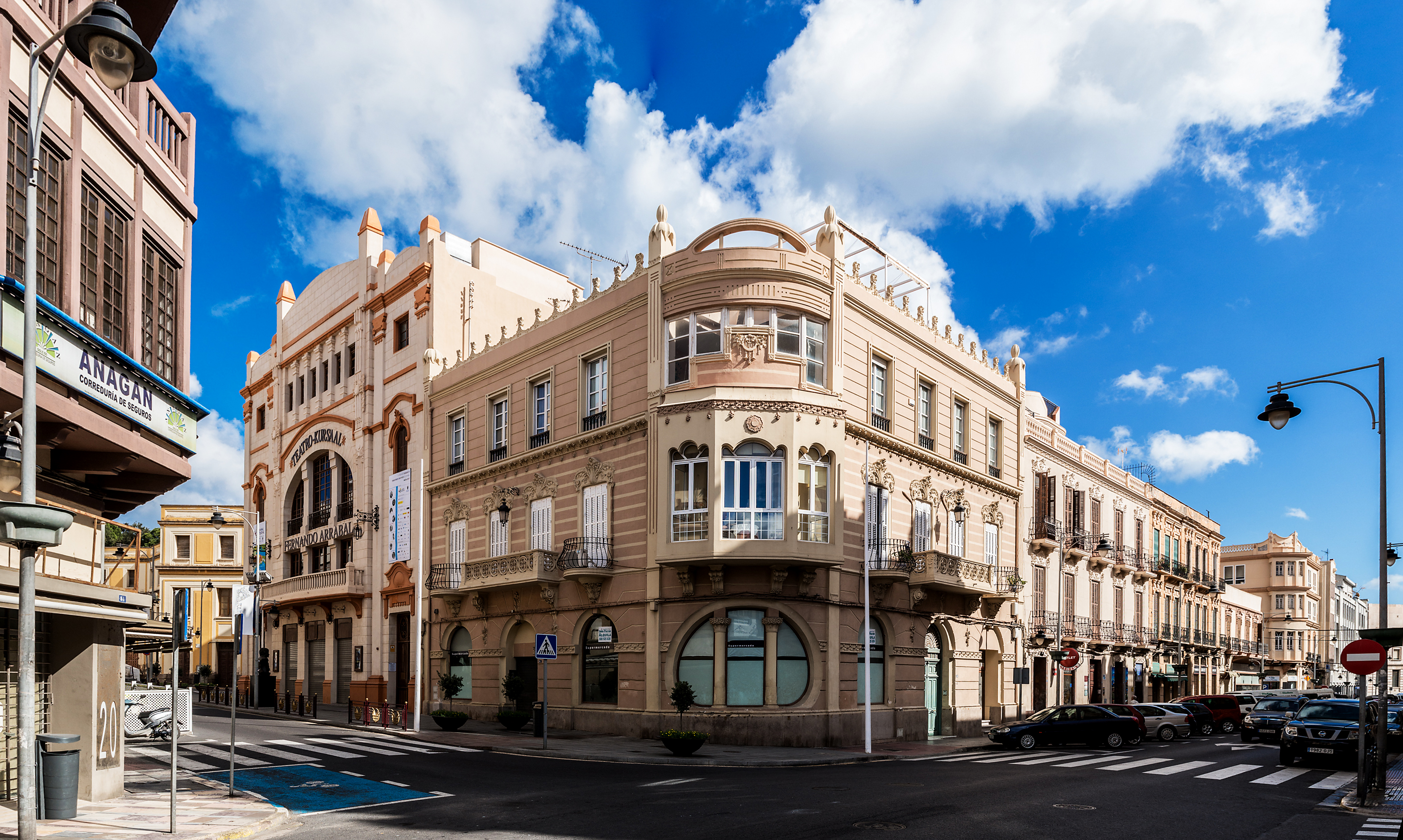
Modernista building, former headquarters of El Telegrama del Rif newspaper.

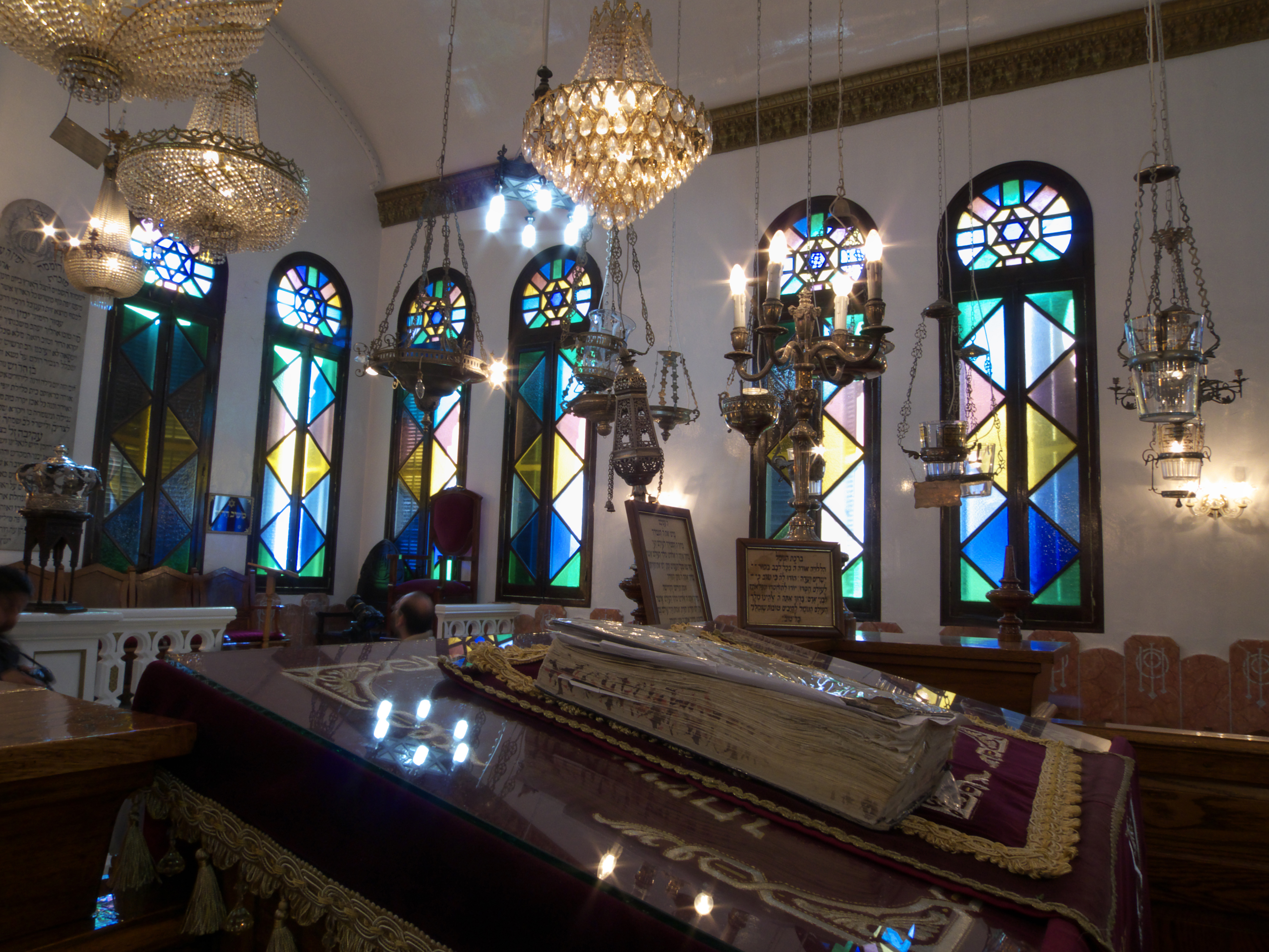
Local synagogue

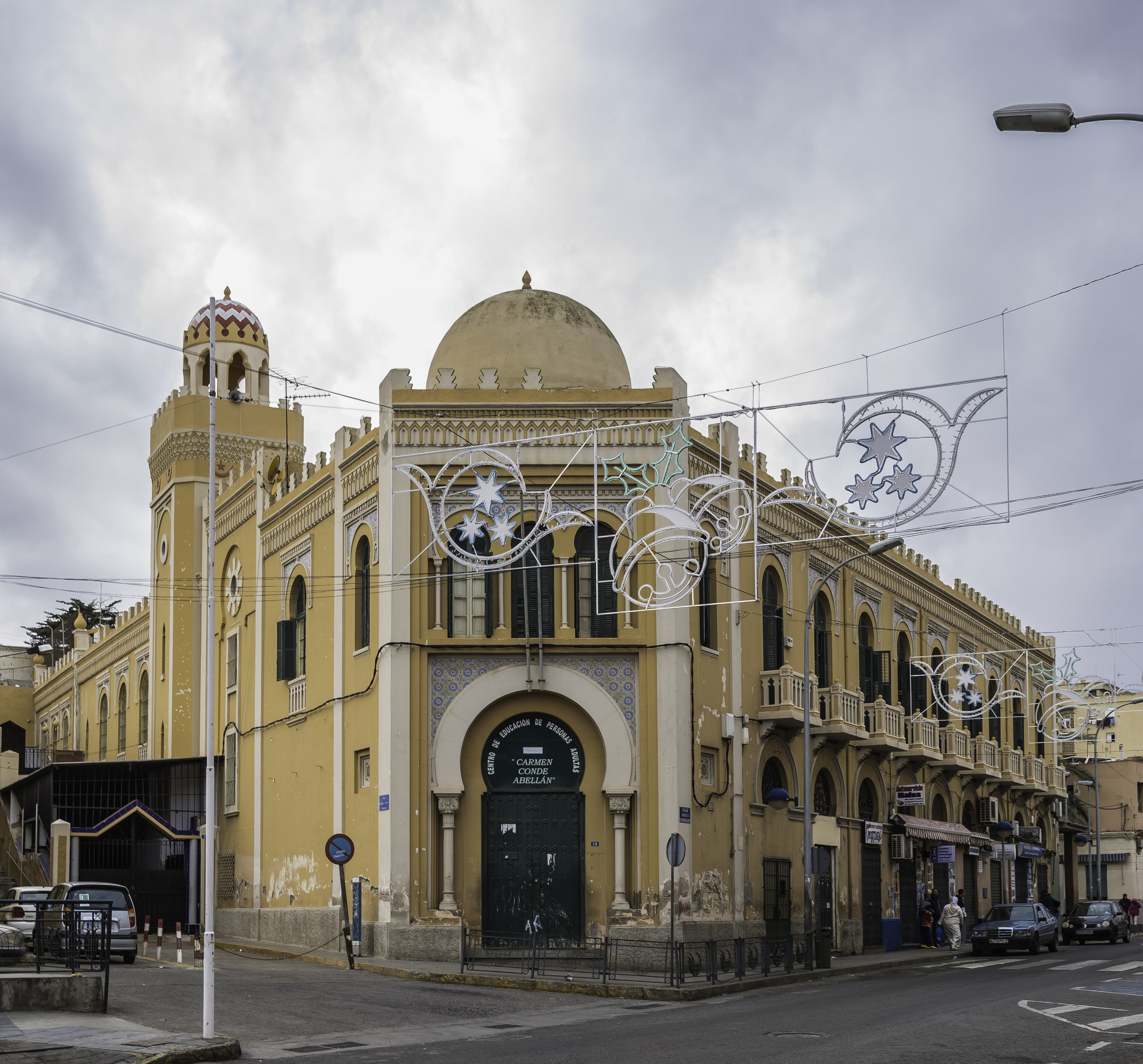
Melilla's central mosque

== Government and administration ==
=== Self-government institutions ===
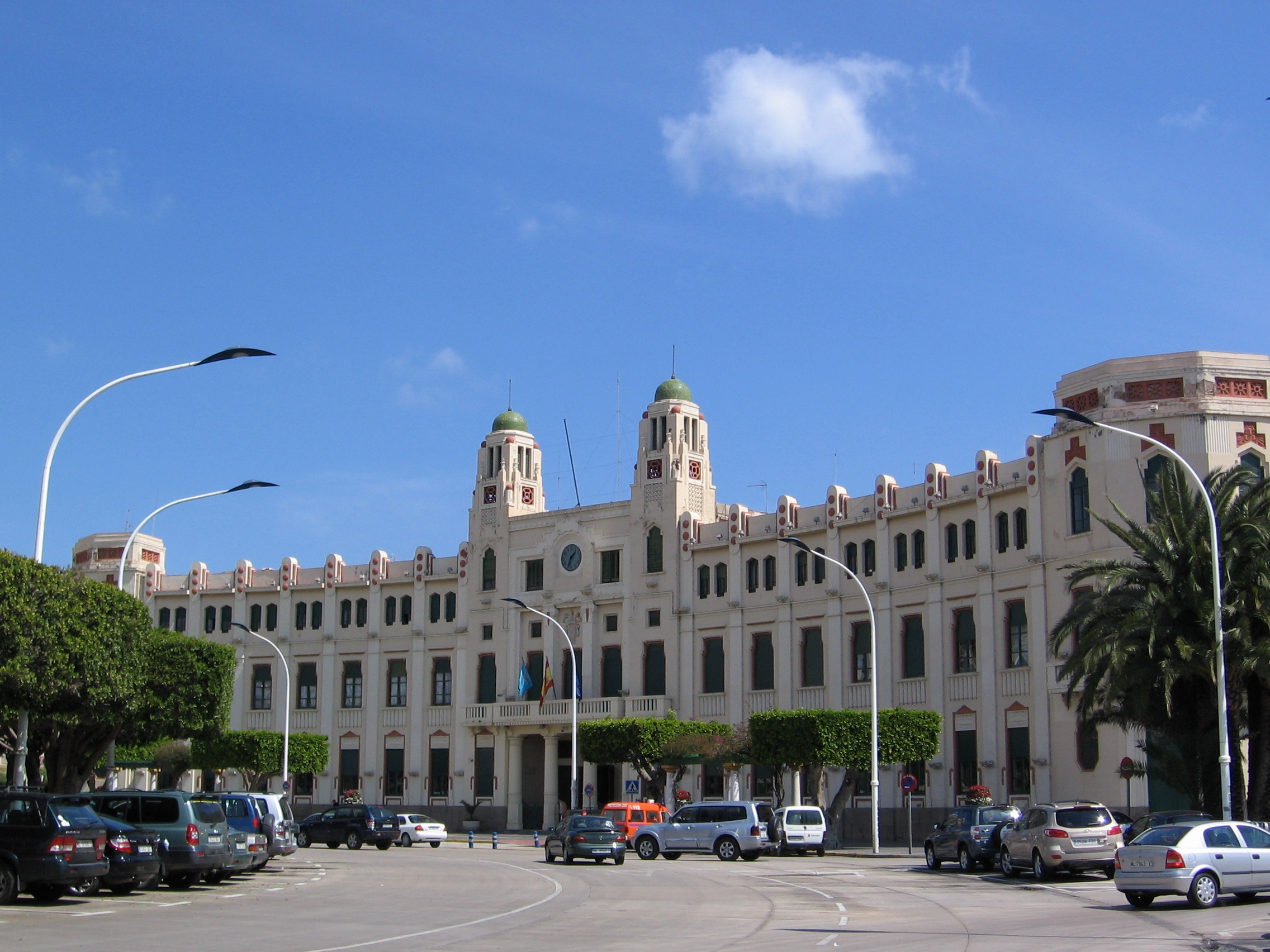
Palace of the Assembly of Melilla

The government bodies stipulated in the Statute of Autonomy are the Assembly of Melilla, the President of Melilla and the Council of Government. The assembly is a 25-member body whose members are elected through universal suffrage every 4 years in closed party lists following the schedule of local elections at the national level. Its members are called "local deputies" but they rather enjoy the status of concejales (municipal councillors). Unlike regional legislatures (and akin to municipal councils), the assembly does not enjoy right of initiative for primary legislation.

The president of Melilla (who, often addressed as Mayor-President, also exerts the roles of Mayor, president of the Assembly, president of the Council of Government and representative of the city) is invested by the Assembly. After local elections, the president is invested through a qualified majority from among the leaders of the election lists, or, failing to achieve the former, the leader of the most voted list at the election is invested to the office. In case of a motion of no confidence the president can only be ousted with a qualified majority voting for an alternative assembly member.

The Council of Government is the traditional collegiate executive body for parliamentary systems. Unlike the municipal government boards in the standard ayuntamientos, the members of the Council of Government (including the vice-presidents) do not need to be members of the assembly.

Melilla is the city in Spain with the highest proportion of postal voting; vote buying (via mail-in ballots) is widely reported to be a common practice in the poor neighborhoods of Melilla. Court cases in this matter had involved the PP, the CPM and the PSOE.

On 15 June 2019, following the May 2019 Melilla Assembly election, the regionalist and left-leaning party of Muslim and Amazigh persuasion Coalition for Melilla (CPM, 8 seats), the Spanish Socialist Workers' Party (PSOE, 4 seats) and Citizens–Party of the Citizenry (Cs, 1 seat) voted in favour of the Cs' candidate (Eduardo de Castro) as the Presidency of the Autonomous City, ousting Juan José Imbroda, from the People's Party (PP, 10 seats), who had been in office since 2000.

Melilla also maintains a local police force known as Policia Local de Melilla (Ciudad Autonoma de Melilla – Policia Local).

=== Administrative subdivisions ===
Melilla is subdivided into eight districts (distritos), which are further subdivided into neighbourhoods (barrios):

- 1st
  - Barrio de Medina Sidonia
  - Barrio del General Larrea
  - Barrio de Ataque Seco
- 2nd
  - Barrio Héroes de España
  - Barrio del General Gómez Jordana
  - Barrio Príncipe de Asturias
- 3rd
  - Barrio del Carmen
- 4th
  - Barrio Polígono Residencial La Paz
  - Barrio Hebreo-Tiro Nacional
- 5th
  - Barrio de Cristóbal Colón
  - Barrio de Cabrerizas
  - Barrio de Batería Jota
  - Barrio de Hernán Cortes y Las Palmeras
  - Barrio de Reina Regente
- 6th
  - Barrio de Concepción Arenal
  - Barrio Isaac Peral (Tesorillo)
- 7th
  - Barrio del General Real
  - Polígono Industrial SEPES
  - Polígono Industrial Las Margaritas
  - Parque Empresarial La Frontera
- 8th
  - Barrio de la Libertad
  - Barrio del Hipódromo
  - Barrio de Alfonso XIII
  - Barrio Industrial
  - Barrio Virgen de la Victoria
  - Barrio de la Constitución
  - Barrio de los Pinares
  - Barrio de la Cañada de Hidum

=== Border security ===
==== Defence and Civil Guard ====
The defence of the enclave is the responsibility of the Spanish Armed Forces' General Command of Melilla. The Spanish Army's combat components of the command include:

- Regulares;
- Tercio "Gran Capitán" No. 1 of the Legion of the Spanish Legion;
- 10th 'Alcántara' Cavalry Regiment equipped with Leopard 2 tanks and ASCOD fighting vehicles;
- 32nd Mixed Artillery Regiment with Grupo de Artillería de Campaña I/32 equipped with Santa Bárbara Sistemas 155/52 towed howitzers and Grupo de Artillería Antiaérea II/32 equipped with Oerlikon GDF anti-aircraft guns; and,
- 8th Engineer Regiment

The command also includes its headquarters battalion as well as logistics elements.

In addition to the defence of Melilla, the garrison is also responsible for the defence of islands and rock formations claimed by Spain off the coast of Morocco. Units of the garrison are deployed to these rock formations to secure them against Moroccan incursions and did so notably during the Perejil Island crisis in 2002. To enhance coastal security, the Spanish Navy based a dedicated patrol boat (Isla Pinto) in Melilla from mid-2023. Melilla itself is about 350 kilometres (220 mi) distant from the main Spanish naval base at Rota on the Spanish mainland while the Spanish Air Force's Morón Air Base is within 300 kilometres (190 mi) proximity.

The Civil Guard is responsible for border security and protects both the territory's fortified land border against frequent, and sometimes significant, migrant incursions.

==== Trans-border relations ====
Melilla forms a sort of trans-border urban conurbation with limited integration together with the neighbouring Moroccan settlements, located at one of the ends of a linear succession of urban sprawl spanning southward in Morocco along the R19 road from Beni Ensar down to Nador and Selouane. The urban system features a high degree of hierarchization, specialization and division of labour, with Melilla as chief provider of services, finance and trade; Nador as an eminently industrial city whereas the rest of Moroccan settlements found themselves in a subordinate role, presenting agro-town features and operating as providers of workforce.

The asymmetry, as reflected for example in the provision of healthcare, has fostered situations such as the large-scale use of the Melillan health services by Moroccan citizens, with Melilla attending a number of urgencies more than four times the standard for its population in 2018. In order to satisfy the workforce needs of Melilla (mainly in areas such as domestic service, construction and cross-border bale workers, often under informal contracts), Moroccan inhabitants of the province of Nador were granted exemptions from visa requirements to enter the autonomous city. This development in turn induced a strong flux of internal migration from other Moroccan provinces to Nador, in order to acquire the aforementioned exemption.

The 'fluid' trans-border relations between Melilla and its surroundings are however not free from conflict, as they are contingent upon the 'tense' trans-national relations between Morocco and Spain.

==== Border securitization ====
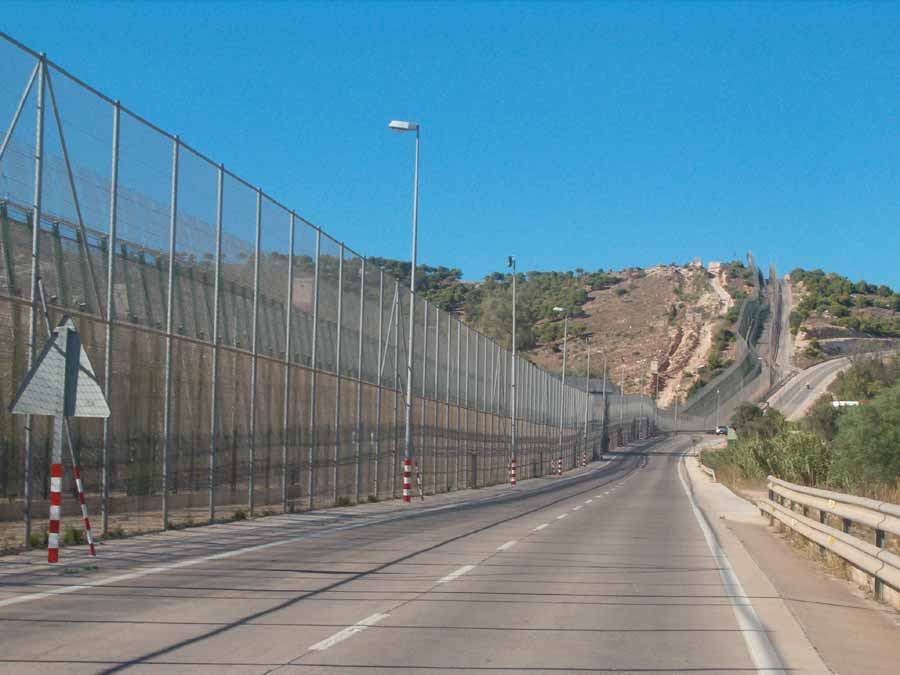
The Melilla border fence aims to curb illegal immigration into the city.

Following the increasing influx of Algerian and sub-Saharan irregular migrants into Ceuta and Melilla in the early 1990s, a process of border fortification in both cities ensued after 1995 to reduce the border's permeability, a target attained to some degree by 1999, although peak level of fortification was reached in 2005.

Melilla's border with Morocco is secured by the Melilla border fence, a 6 metres (20 ft) tall double fence with watch towers; yet migrants (in groups of tens or sometimes hundreds) storm the fence and manage to cross it from time to time. Since 2005, at least 14 migrants have died trying to cross the fence. The Melilla migrant reception centre was built with a capacity of 480. In 2020 works to remove the barbed wire from the top of the fence (meanwhile raising its height up to more than 10 metres (33 ft) in the stretches most susceptible to breaches) were commissioned to Tragsa.

In June 2022, at least 23 sub-Saharan migrants and two Moroccan security personnel were killed when around 2,000 migrants stormed the border. The death toll has been estimated to be as high as 37 by certain NGOs. Around 200 Spanish and Moroccan law enforcement officers and at least 76 migrants were injured. Hundreds of migrants succeeded in breaching the fence, and 133 made it across the border. Widely circulated footage showed dozens of motionless migrants piled together. It was the worst such incident in Melilla's history. The United Nations, the African Union and a number of human rights groups condemned what they deemed excessive force used by Moroccan and Spanish border guards, although no lethal weapons were employed, and the deaths were later attributed to "mechanical asphyxiation".

Morocco has been paid tens of million euros by both Spain and the European Union to outsource the EU migration control. Besides the double fence in the Spanish side of the border, there is an additional 3 metres (9.8 ft) high fence entirely made of razor wire lying on the Moroccan side as well as a moat in between.

== Economy ==
The gross domestic product (GDP) of the autonomous community was 1.6 billion euros in 2018, accounting for 0.1% of Spanish economic output. GDP per capita adjusted for purchasing power was 19,900 euros or 66% of the EU27 average in the same year. Melilla was the NUTS2 region with the lowest GDP per capita in Spain.

Melilla does not participate in the European Union Customs Union (EUCU). There is no VAT (IVA) tax, but a local reduced-rate tax called IPSI is rendered. Preserving the status of a free port, imports are free of tariffs and the only tax concerning them is the IPSI. However, exports to the Customs Union (including Peninsular Spain) are subject to the correspondent customs tariff and are taxed with the correspondent VAT. There are some special manufacturing taxes regarding electricity and transport, as well as complementary charges on tobacco and oil and fuel products.

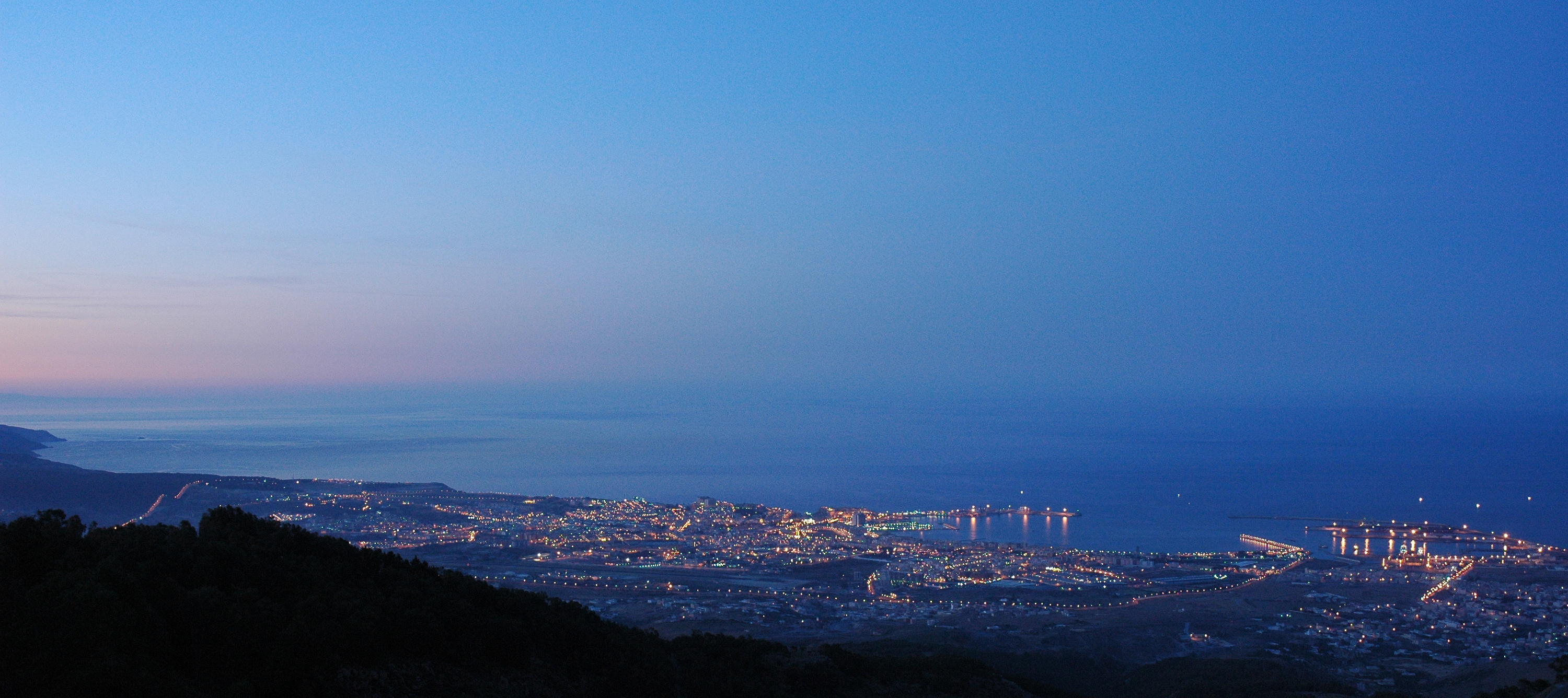
Night view of Melilla (centre) and Beni Ensar in Morocco (right)

The principal industry is fishing. Cross-border commerce (legal or smuggled) and Spanish and European grants and wages are the other income sources.

Melilla is regularly connected to the Iberian peninsula by air and sea traffic. It is also economically connected to Morocco, as most of its fruit and vegetables are imported across the border. Moroccans in the city's hinterland are attracted to it, as 36,000 Moroccans cross the border daily to work, shop or trade goods. The port of Melilla offers several daily connections to Almería and Málaga. Melilla Airport offers daily flights to Almería, Málaga and Madrid. Air Europa and Iberia operate in Melilla's airport.

Many people travelling between Europe and Morocco use the ferry links to Melilla, both for passengers and for freight. Because of this, the port and related companies form an important economic driver for the city.

=== Tourism ===
In order to boost growth and as a measure to promote tourism in the Autonomous City of Melilla, the Tourist Board has developed a Regulatory Decree for bonuses for Tourist Packages to Melilla.

The Tourist Package consists of the application of discounts on return tickets by plane or boat provided that they include accommodation during the stay in Melilla in one of the types of tourist accommodations or at the home of a resident of the city and do not exceed, between the round trip dates, ten days.

== Transport ==
Melilla Airport is serviced by Air Nostrum, flying to the Spanish cities of Málaga, Madrid, Barcelona, Las Palmas de Gran Canaria, Palma de Mallorca, Granada, Badajoz, Sevilla and Almería. In April 2013, a local enterprise set up the short-lived Melilla Airlines, flying from the city to Málaga. The city is linked to Málaga, Almería and Motril by ferry.

Three roads connect Melilla and Morocco but require clearance through border checkpoints.

== Water supply ==
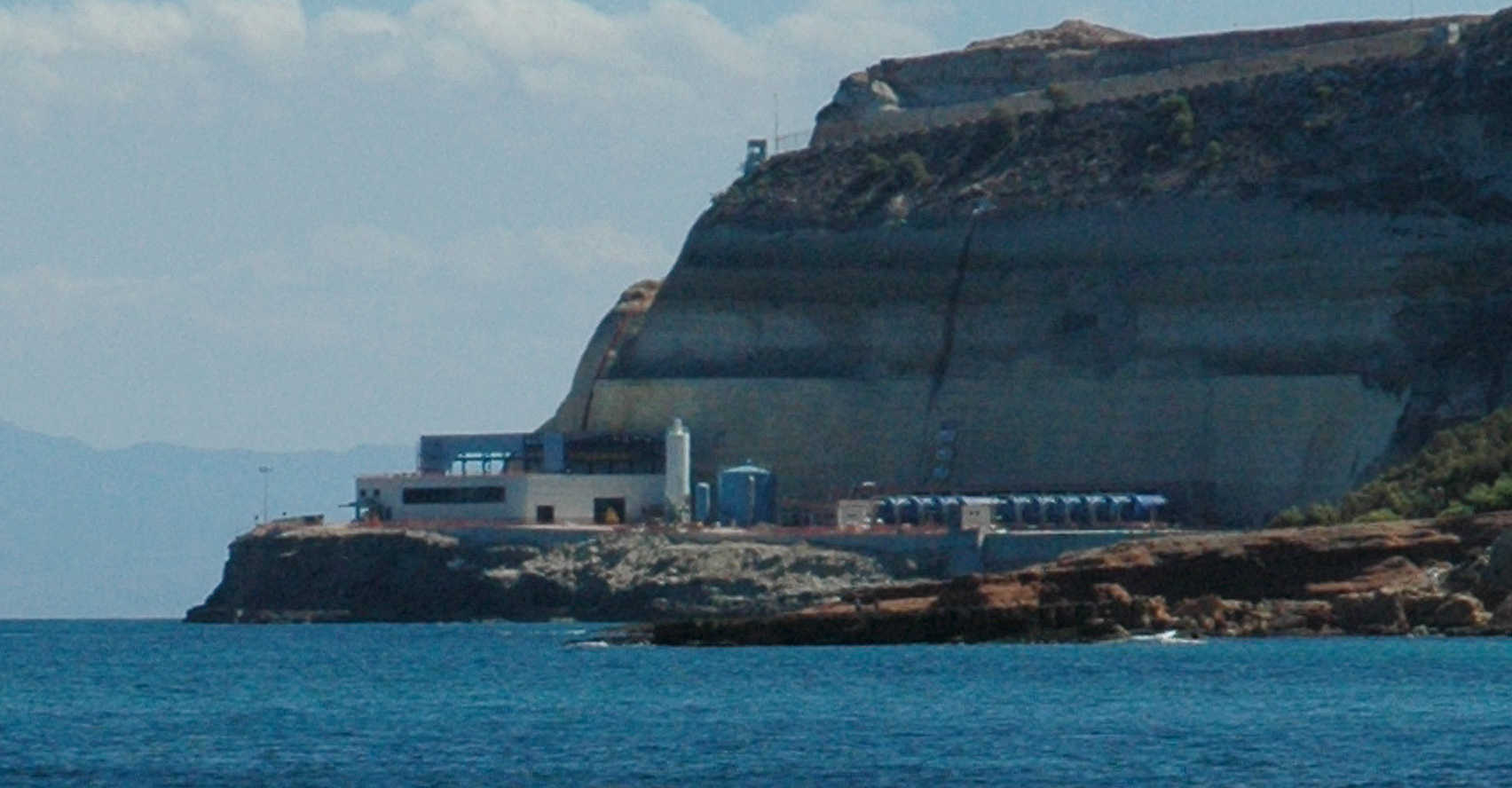
View of the Melilla's desalination plant

Melilla's water supply primarily came from a network of dug wells (which by the turn of the 21st century suffered from overexploitation and had also experienced a degradation of the water quality and the intrusion of seawater), as well as the capture of the Río de Oro's underflow. Seeking to address the water supply problem, works for the construction of a desalination plant in the Aguadú cliffs, projected to produce 22,000 m^{3} (29,000 cu yd) a day, started in November 2003. The plant entered operation in March 2007. Its daily operation is partially funded by the central government. Relative to the Spanish average (and similarly to the Canary and Balearic Islands), the city's population spends a comparatively larger amount of money on bottled water.

Funded by the European Regional Development Fund and the Confederación Hidrográfica del Guadalquivir, works for the expansion of the plant's production capabilities up to 30,000 m^{3} (39,000 cu yd) a day started by September 2020.

== Sport ==
Melilla is a surfing destination. The city's football club, UD Melilla, plays in the third tier of Spanish football, the Segunda División B. The club was founded in 1943 and since 1945 have played at the 12,000-seater Estadio Municipal Álvarez Claro. Until the other club was dissolved in 2012, UD Melilla played the Ceuta-Melilla derby against AD Ceuta. The clubs travelled to each other via the Spanish mainland to avoid entering Morocco. The second-highest ranked club in the city was Casino del Real CF of the fourth-tier Tercera División; until they were dissolved in 2013.

The governing institution of football in the exclave is the Melilla Football Federation.

== International relations ==
=== Twin towns – sister cities ===
Melilla is twinned with:

- Caracas (Venezuela).
- Cavite City (Philippines).
- Ceuta (Spain).
- Toledo (Spain).
- Málaga (Spain).
- Montevideo (Uruguay).
- Motril (Spain); since January 2008.
- Almería (Spain).
- Mantua (Italy); since September 2013.
- Vélez-Málaga (Spain); since January 2014.
- Antequera (Spain); as of 2016, in process.

=== Dispute with Morocco ===
The Moroccan government has repeatedly called for Spain to transfer the sovereignty of Melilla, Ceuta and the plazas de soberanía to Morocco, with Spain's refusal to do so serving as a major source of tension in Morocco–Spain relations. In Morocco, Ceuta is frequently referred to as the "occupied Sebtah", and the Moroccan government has argued that the city, along with other Spanish territories in the region, are colonies. One of the major arguments cited by Morocco in support of its claim to sovereignty over Melilla is the city's geographical position, as Melilla is an exclave surrounded by Moroccan territory and the Mediterranean Sea and has no territorial continuity with the rest of Spain. This argument was originally developed by one of the founders of the Moroccan anti-colonial Istiqlal Party, Alal-El Faasi, who openly advocated for Morocco to invade and occupy Melilla and other North African territories under Spanish rule. Spain, in line with the majority of nations in the rest of the world, has never recognized Morocco's claim over Melilla. The official position of the Spanish government is that Melilla is an integral part of Spain, and has been since the 16th century, centuries prior to Morocco's independence from Spain and France in 1956. The majority of Melilla's population support continued Spanish sovereignty and are opposed to Moroccan control over the territory.

In 1986, Spain joined NATO. However, Melilla is not under NATO protection since Article 6 of the North Atlantic Treaty limits such coverage to Europe and North America and islands north of the Tropic of Cancer. However, French Algeria was explicitly included in the treaty upon France's entry. Legal experts have claimed that other articles of the treaty could cover Spanish territories in North Africa but this interpretation has not been tested in practice. During the 2022 Madrid summit, the issue of the protection of Melilla was raised by Spain, with NATO Secretary General Jens Stoltenberg stating: "On which territories NATO protects and Ceuta and Melilla, NATO is there to protect all Allies against any threats. At the end of the day, it will always be a political decision to invoke Article 5, but rest assured NATO is there to protect and defend all Allies". On 21 December 2020, following statements made by Moroccan Prime Minister Saadeddine Othmani that Melilla is "Moroccan as the Sahara", the Spanish government summoned the Moroccan ambassador, Karima Benyaich, to convey that Spain expects all its partners to respect the sovereignty and territorial integrity of its territory in Africa and asked for an explanation for Othmani's words.

== See also ==
- Fuerte de Cabrerizas Altas
- European enclaves in North Africa before 1830
- Melilla (Congress of Deputies constituency)
