= Río de Oro (Melilla) =

River in Melilla

Coordinates: 35°17′N 2°56′W

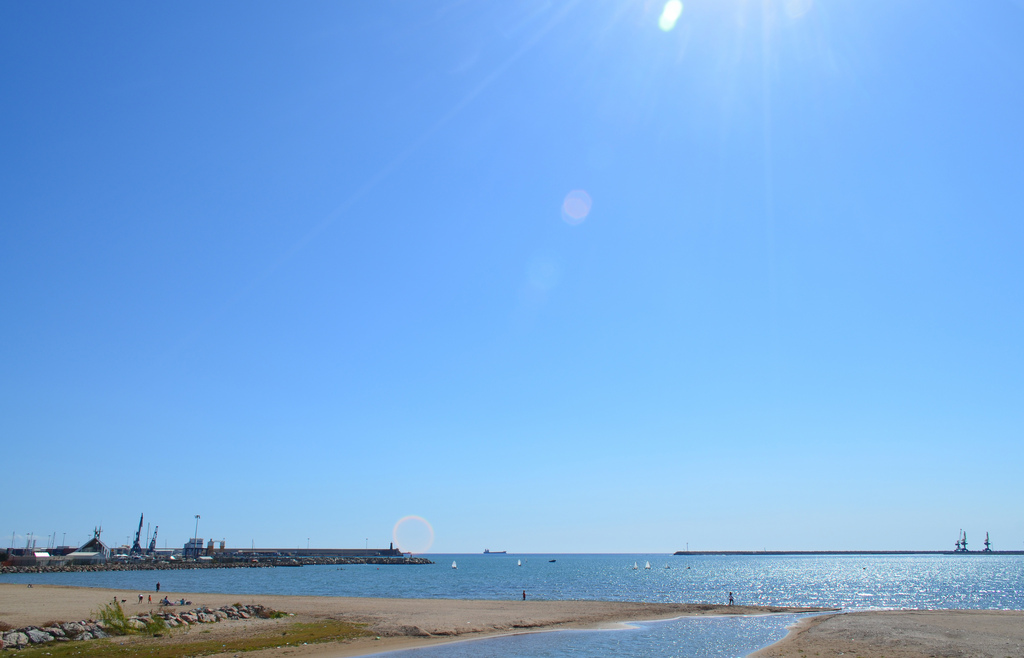
Mouth of the Río de Oro in Melilla.

The Río de Oro (River of Gold) is a river which flows in northeast Morocco to reach the Mediterranean Sea at the harbour of the Spanish exclave of Melilla.
