= Javier López =

Javier or Javi López may refer to:

== Politicians ==
- Javier López (general) (1792–1836), Argentine soldier and several times governor of Tucumán
- Javier López Marcano (1955–2026), Spanish politician
- Javier López Zavala (born 1969), Mexican politician and convicted killer
- Javier López Estrada (born 1981), Spanish politician
- Javi López Fernández (born 1985), Spanish member of the European Parliament

== Sportspeople ==
- Javi López (footballer, born 1964) (Francisco Javier López Castro), Spanish retired footballer and manager
- Javy López (Javier López Torres, born 1970), Puerto Rican former catcher in Major League baseball
- Javier López Vallejo (born 1975), retired Spanish footballer
- Javier López (baseball) (born 1977), Puerto Rican–American baseball player
- Carlos Javier López (born 1980), Argentine footballer
- Arturo López (Javier Arturo López, born 1983), Mexican-American baseball pitcher
- Javi López (footballer, born 1986) (Javier López Rodríguez, born 1986), Spanish footballer
- Javi López (footballer, born 1988) (Francisco Javier López Díaz), Spanish footballer
- Javier López (sport shooter) (born 1989), Spanish sports shooter
- Javi López (footballer, born 1990) (Javier López Muñoz), Spanish footballer
- Javi López (footballer, born 2002) (Javier López Carballo), Spanish footballer

== Others ==
- Francisco Javier López Díaz (theologian) (born 1949), Spanish theologian and a priest of the Catholic Church

== See also ==
- Francisco Javier López (disambiguation)
