= Aja =

Aja, Ajja, or AJA may refer to:

== Abbreviations ==
- AJ Auxerre, a French football club
- Ajaccio Napoleon Bonaparte Airport's IATA airport code
- Al Jazeera America, an American news channel
- American Jewish Archives
- American Journal of Archaeology
- Arbeitskreis gemeinnütziger Jugendaustauschorganisationen, a German organization of non-profit youth exchange groups
- The Association of Japanese Animations
- Australian Jewish Association, an organisation representing Jewish people in Australia
- Australian Journalists Association, part of the Media, Entertainment and Arts Alliance
- Islamic Republic of Iran Army, sometimes called AJA from its Persian name

== Anthropology ==
- Aja people, a people living in Benin
  - Aja language (Niger–Congo), the language of the Aja people, part of the Gbe dialect continuum
- Aja people (South Sudan), an ethnic group living in South Sudan
  - Aja language (Nilo-Saharan), a language spoken in Sudan

== Music ==
- Aja (album), a 1977 Steely Dan album
  - "Aja" (song), the title track of that album
- Aja!, a 2015 Maija Vilkkumaa album

== Religion and mythology ==
- Aja (Hindu mythology), a prince of the Ikshvaku dynasty
- Aja (orisha), or Ajija, a Yoruba spirit of the whirlwind
- Aja, another name of the Hindu god Shiva

== Other uses ==
- Aja (name), including a list of people with the name
- Aja Mountain, a mountain in Ha'il, Saudi Arabia
- Ajja (restaurant), a Middle Eastern restaurant in Raleigh, North Carolina
- Ajjah, a Palestinian village in the northern West Bank

== See also ==
- アジャ (disambiguation)
