= Aja language =

There are two languages called Aja:

- Aja language (Niger-Congo), part of the Gbe dialect continuum, spoken in Benin and Togo
- Aja language (Nilo-Saharan), spoken in South Sudan

== See also ==
- Aja (disambiguation)
