= Gaahmg =

Gaahmg may refer to:

- Gaahmg people, or Ingessana people
- Gaam language, or Ingessana, an Eastern Sudanic language spoken by the Ingessana people
