= Justo de las Cuevas =

Spanish politician (1931–2022)

Deputy of the Congress of Deputies for Cantabria
- In office 15 June 1977 – 31 August 1982

President of the Parliament of Cantabria
- In office 10 September 1979 – 20 February 1982
- Succeeded by: Isaac Aja (as President of the Provisional Parliament of Cantabria)

Personal details
- Born: September 1931 Bárcena de Pie de Concha, Cantabria, Spain
- Died: 25 August 2022 (aged 90) Santander, Cantabria, Spain
- Political party: Union of the Democratic Centre
- Occupation: Cattle farmer

Justo de las Cuevas (September 1931 – 25 August 2022) was a Spanish politician who served as a Deputy. He was born in Bárcena de Pie de Concha, Cantabria, Spain and was a prominent member of the Spanish transition to democracy and of the autonomic process in Cantabria.
