= Javier López Marcano =

Spanish politician (1955–2026)

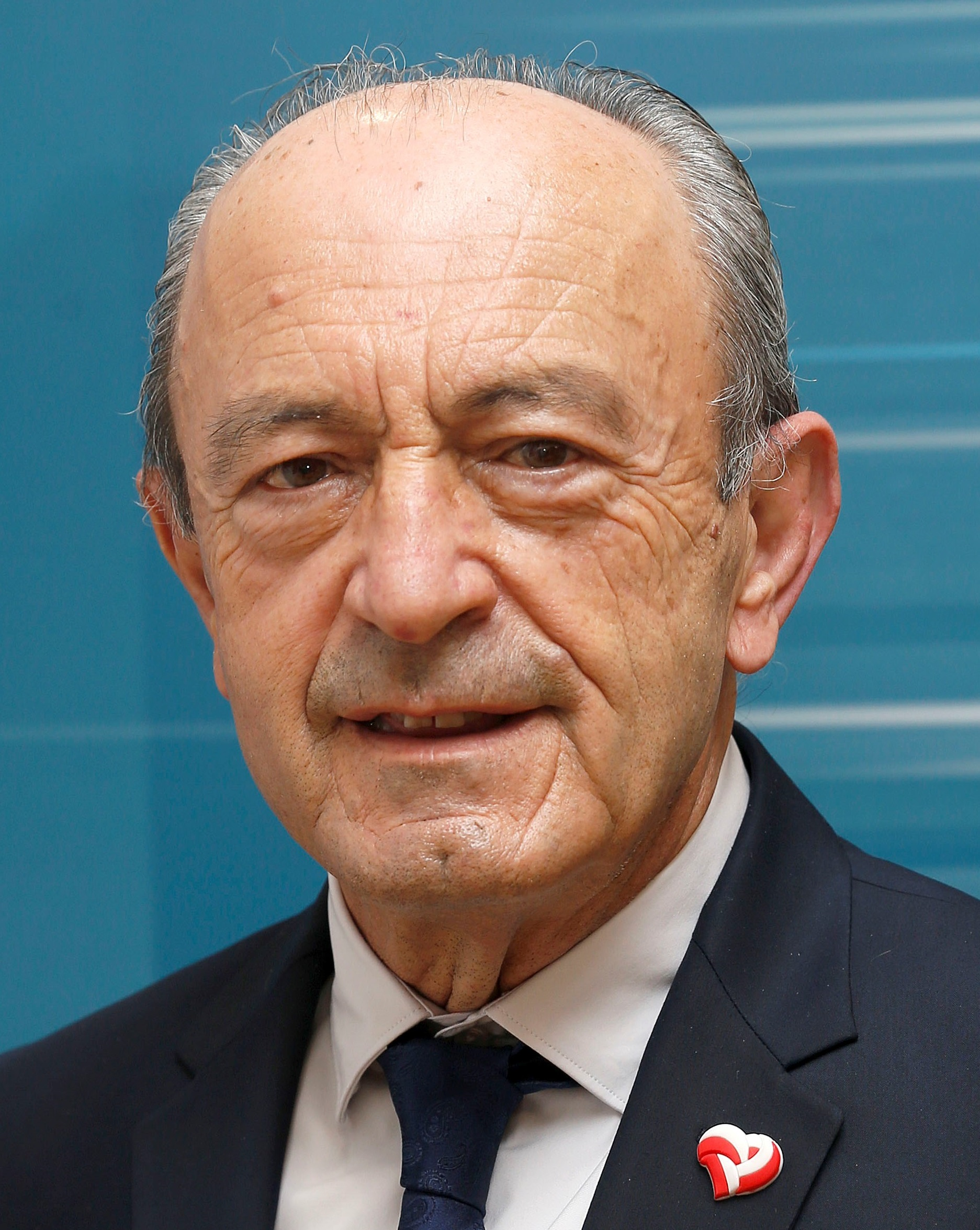
- López Marcano in 2021

Deputy in the Parliament of Cantabria
- In office 22 June 2023 – 2 April 2026
- In office 13 July 1999 – 18 June 2015

Mayor of Torrelavega
- In office 4 July 1999 – 16 June 2003
- Preceded by: Blanca Rosa Gómez Morante
- Succeeded by: Blanca Rosa Gómez Morante

Personal details
- Born: Francisco Javier López Marcano; 26 January 1955 Torrelavega, Spain
- Died: 2 April 2026 (aged 71) Torrelavega, Spain
- Party: Regionalist Party of Cantabria
- Children: Javier López Estrada

Francisco Javier López Marcano (26 January 1955 – 2 April 2026) was a Spanish politician of the Regionalist Party of Cantabria (PRC).

López Marcano was a councillor in his hometown of Torrelavega from 1987 to 1995, and the mayor from 1999 to 2003. Between 1995 and 2023 he had three stints in the Government of Cantabria, in ministry posts relating to tourism. He was a member of the Parliament of Cantabria from 1999 to 2015, when he resigned his seat due to legal cases. Having been cleared of wrongdoing, he was re-elected to the parliament in 2023 and died in office in 2026.

== Early life and education ==
López Marcano was born in Torrelavega in Cantabria on 26 January 1955. He graduated in Hispanic philosophy and letters from the University of Valladolid. He taught Latin at the Marques de Santillana secondary school in his hometown.

== Political career ==
López Marcano began his political activity in the Asociación para la Defensa de los Intereses de Cantabria (ADIC) in 1977. Ten years later, he joined the Regionalist Party of Cantabria and was elected to the council of his hometown of Torrelavega.

=== 1995–2011 ===
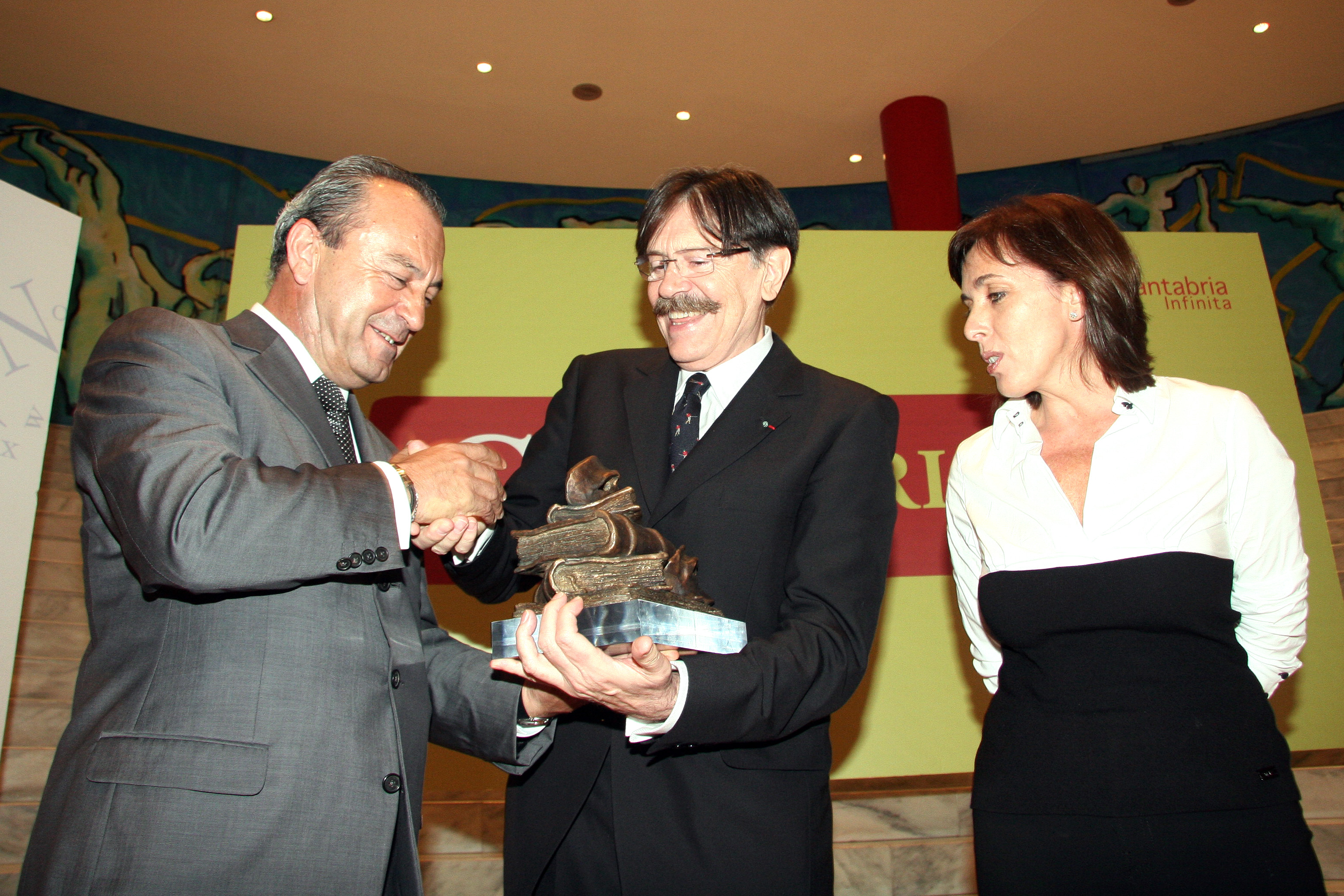
López Marcano awards the Premios Mayte award for theatre to Josep Maria Flotats in 2007

After two terms in local government, López Marcano was put in charge of the Ministry of Culture and Tourism in the Government of Cantabria, from 1995 to 1999. This was the first government with PRC involvement, assisting the People's Party (PP) of the President of Cantabria, José Joaquín Martínez Sieso.

López Marcano was the mayor of his hometown of Torrelavega from 1999 to 2003. According to Gonzalo Sellers of regional newspaper El Diario Montañés, his mayoral term was known for extravagant celebrations of patron saints' days and New Year's Eve. He then returned to regional government until 2011, in charge of the Ministry of Culture, Tourism and Sport. In 2004, López Marcano introduced the slogan "Cantabria Inifinita" (Infinite Cantabria). He oversaw the expansion of services at Santander Airport, and brought Bruce Springsteen to the Palacio de Deportes de Santander on 25 October 2006.

While minister, López Marcano was accused of misconduct in office over the construction of a gorilla exhibit at Cabárceno Natural Park. He was acquitted by the High Court of Justice of Cantabria in April 2014, and the acquittal was confirmed by the Supreme Court of Spain in December.

=== 2011–2021 ===
First elected to the Parliament of Cantabria in 1999, López Marcano was named vice-president of the legislature after the 2011 election. He was re-elected to the Parliament of Cantabria in 2015 but did not take his seat. Podemos would only support PRC leader Miguel Ángel Revilla as regional president if López Marcano would not take his seat, as he was implicated in investigations about the finances of local football club Racing de Santander. The case was closed without charge in January 2017, and three years later an investigation into subsidies to the club was also closed without charge.

While out of office, López Marcano taught Latin. In January 2021, he was named minister of industry and tourism in Revilla's fourth regional government, and resumed his status as secretary general of the PRC.

=== 2023–2026 ===
Ahead of the 2023 Cantabrian regional election, López Marcano was named third on the PRC list, after Revilla and Paula Fernández Viaña. He ran for president of the Parliament of Cantabria, which went to María José González Revuelta of the PP with 18 votes due to support from Vox. López Marcano received 16 votes from his party and the Spanish Socialist Workers' Party, and therefore became vice-president of the legislature again.

== Personal life and death ==
López Marcano and his wife Pilar Estrada had two daughters and a son. Their son, Javier López Estrada, was elected mayor of Torrelavega in 2019 and also sat in the Parliament of Cantabria for the PRC.

López Marcano died of a heart attack in the early hours of 2 April 2026, at the age of 71. His longtime colleague Revilla remembered him as a "fundamental pillar of regionalism". The council in Torrelavega announced three days of official mourning. His funeral was held on 6 April at the town's Iglesia de Nuestra Señora de la Asunción.
