= April 2023 Banyani Kilo massacres =

- Part of Ituri conflict
- Location: Itendeyi, Batata, Sabayido, Djambisse, Carriere Penge, Matete, and Kilo, Banyani Kilo Chiefdom, Djugu Territory, Ituri, Democratic Republic of the Congo
- Date: April 14, 2023
- Deaths: 46-62
- Injuries: 13
- Perpetrator: CODECO

On April 14, 2023, CODECO militants attacked several villages in Banyani Kilo Chiefdom, Ituri, Democratic Republic of the Congo, killing between 46 and 62 people.

== Background ==
CODECO is a Congolese militant group based in Ituri and predominantly composed of Lendus. The group has attacked Hema communities in conflicts over farming and land rights for decades, although CODECO's insurgency in recent years had disproportionately targeted civilians.

== Massacres ==
CODECO militants attacked ten villages in Banyani Kilo chiefdom on April 14; Itendeyi, Batata, Sabayido, Djambisse, Carriere Penge, Matete, and Kilo. The attacks on the towns were intended to seize control of them and exploit the gold mines located there. Jean-Robert Bassiloko, the coordinator of civil society in Kilo, reported that 35 people were killed in Kilo and the surrounding villages, while ten were killed near Matete. Congolese MP Gratien Iracan reported that at least 62 people were killed in the CODECO attacks. Thirteen others were wounded. Both women and men were targeted in the killings, along with five children. The militants also burned homes and destroyed property.

Leaders in Banyani Kilo chiefdom deplored the massacres. The Congolese Army also said on April 15 that the situation was put under control, but did not elaborate.

== Aftermath ==
On April 30, CODECO militants killed eight farmers in the villages of Duvire, Njalo, and Bengi, all three in Djugu territory.
