= Eduardo Obregón =

Spanish politician, writer, and professor (1919–2006)

Eduardo Obregón Barreda

President of the Parliament of Cantabria
- In office 3 July 1987 – 31 December 1989
- Preceded by: Guillermo Gómez Martínez-Conde
- Succeeded by: Adolfo Pajares

Member of the Parliament of Cantabria
- In office 1987–1990

General Secretary of the PRC
- In office 8 December 1979 – 20 March 1988
- Preceded by: Position established
- Succeeded by: Miguel Ángel Revilla

Councillor of the Santander City Council
- In office 1979–1983

Personal details
- Born: 2 October 1919 Santander, Cantabria, Spain
- Died: 17 May 2006 (aged 86) Esles, Cantabria, Spain
- Party: Regionalist Party of Cantabria
- Profession: professor of Greek

Eduardo Obregón Barreda (Santander, 2 October 1919 – Esles, 17 May 2006) was a Spanish professor of Greek, writer, and politician, a founding member of the Regionalist Party of Cantabria (PRC) and President of the Regional Assembly of Cantabria.

He was an opponent of the Francoist dictatorship, active in the Workers' Brotherhood of Catholic Action (Hermandad Obrera de Acción Católica, HOAC by its acronym in Spanish), Christians for Socialism, and the Popular Liberation Front. He was arrested with fourteen others by police for leading a seminar on "Marxist atheism," charged with illegal assembly. During the Spanish Transition, he ran for the Senate in the 1977 general election as an independent under Senators for Democracy.

In 1978, he co-founded the Regionalist Party of Cantabria and served as its general secretary through its first three regional congresses until 1988, when Miguel Ángel Revilla succeeded him. On the PRC's 25th anniversary, he was named honorary president. He ran for the Senate again in the 1979 general election and led the PRC's list in the 1979 municipal elections for Santander City Council, serving as a councillor until 1983. In 1987, he became President of the Regional Assembly of Cantabria, resigning in 1989 after a conviction for prevarication by the High Court of Justice of Cantabria, which disqualified him from public office for six years and one day for improperly removing a convicted deputy's privileged status. The Supreme Court later acquitted him, deeming his actions a non-punishable irregularity.

== Biography ==
=== Education, literary work, and personal life ===
Obregón earned a doctorate in Philosophy and Letters from the Complutense University of Madrid, where he served as an assistant professor for two years. He was a professor of Greek at two institutes in Santander. In 1949, he joined the Santa Clara Institute, serving as head of studies and director in the late 1960s, and retired from the José María Pereda Institute. He authored six books, including Las razones del proletariado, Las clases sociales: qué son y qué significan, El mundo de las palabras, Democracia, and Las autonomías territoriales. He published an article in the Catholic weekly Signo, advocating for Catholics' involvement in politics, and wrote on Cantabrism in regional press.

He married María Luisa Gómez Laiz, with whom he had four children: María Luisa, Eduardo, Javier, and Alicia. His granddaughter, Ana Obregón Abascal, led the PRC's list for Santa María de Cayón in the 2007 municipal elections, becoming the party's youngest candidate and securing three councillors. She ran again in the 2011 municipal elections, achieving the same result.

Obregón died on 17 May 2006, prompting the regional government to declare two days of mourning with flags at half-mast. His funeral was held the next day at Nuestra Señora del Carmen church in Barrio Pesquero, attended by hundreds, including Miguel Ángel Revilla, and he was buried in the family pantheon in Esles, Santa María de Cayón.

=== Political career ===
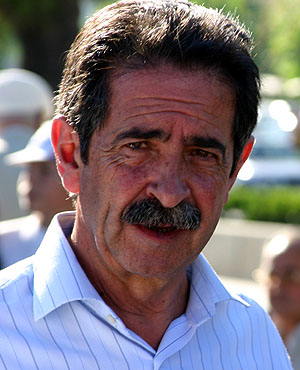
Miguel Ángel Revilla, one of the five founders of the Regionalist Party of Cantabria and Obregón's successor as PRC general secretary.

Obregón opposed the Francoist dictatorship, participating in the HOAC, Christians for Socialism, and the Popular Liberation Front. He wrote an article in Santander's Hoja del Lunes condemning the 1973 Chilean coup against Salvador Allende, earning a reprimand from the provincial governor. On 21 April 1968, he was arrested with fourteen others after a HOAC seminar in Santander on "Marxist atheism," which he led, spending a night in custody for illegal assembly. In the 1977 general election, he ran for the Senate in Cantabria as an independent with Senators for Democracy, but was not elected.

In 1978, he co-founded the Regionalist Party of Cantabria with Miguel Ángel Revilla, Ignacio Gómez Llata, and Torrelavega syndicalists José Somarriba and José Luis Oria, both promoters of the Association for the Defense of the Interests of Cantabria (Asociación para la Defensa de los Intereses de Cantabria, ADIC by its acronym in Spanish). In the 1979 general election, he ran for the Senate with the PRC, alongside Benito Huerta and Ramón Arias Azpiazu, but none were elected.

In the 1979 municipal elections, he led the PRC's list for Santander City Council, securing four of 27 councillors, making the PRC the third-largest force in Santander. Initially, the PRC agreed to support socialist Jesús Cabezón for mayor, but Obregón and the PRC councillors voted for Juan Hormaechea of the UCD, securing his mayoralty. This decision led to protests by about 700 people outside the city hall, forcing PRC councillors to exit under police escort. He served as a councillor until 1983.

Obregón was elected to the Regional Assembly of Cantabria for its second legislature (1987–1991). In the 1987 regional election, People's Alliance won 19 seats, one short of a majority, while the PRC achieved its best result with five deputies. Juan Hormaechea, running as an independent for People's Alliance, was elected president with the abstention of the CDS and opposition from the PSOE and PRC. Obregón was appointed assembly president with opposition party votes, but resigned in December 1989 after a prevarication conviction by the High Court of Justice of Cantabria, disqualifying him for six years and one day. The conviction stemmed from removing deputy José Luis Vallines' privileged status after a social offense conviction, rather than suspending him as required. In March 1988, Obregón had pledged to resign if accusations by Hormaechea of recording private deputy conversations were proven, following an incident where Hormaechea's microphone captured insults to a CDS deputy. In April 1992, the Supreme Court acquitted him, ruling his actions a non-punishable irregularity. Adolfo Pajares succeeded him as assembly president in February 1990.

At the PRC's first regional congress (8–9 December 1979), Obregón was elected general secretary, a role he held through the 1982 and 1985 congresses until Miguel Ángel Revilla succeeded him in 1988. In 2003, Revilla named him honorary president for the PRC's 25th anniversary.

== Eduardo Obregón Foundation ==
On 16 April 2009, the PRC's Executive Committee established the non-profit Eduardo Obregón Foundation, announced publicly the next day by Vice-Secretary General Rafael de la Sierra and Organization Secretary Pedro Hernando. It was formally established on 12 September 2011 in Camargo, with its office at the PRC's Santander headquarters. The board included Miguel Ángel Revilla as president, Rafael de la Sierra and Francisco Javier López Marcano as members, and Ana Obregón Abascal as secretary.

The foundation's statutes aim to promote studies on equality among autonomous communities, defend state unity, combat political corruption, advocate for a research-based economic model, support public infrastructure development, promote regionalist sentiment through cultural and historical studies, publish regionalist and Europeanist materials, preserve national and regional identity for non-residents, and pursue activities aligned with the Spanish Constitution of 1978 and regionalist principles.

== See also ==
- Parliament of Cantabria

== Bibliography ==
- Redondo Gálvez, Gonzalo (2006). Historia de la Iglesia en España (1936–1939) [History of the Church in Spain (1936-1939)] (in Spanish). Rialp. ISBN 84-321-3016-8.
- Moure, Alfonso; Suárez, Manuel (2002). De la montaña a Cantabria: la construcción de una comunidad autónoma [From the mountains to Cantabria: the creation of an autonomous community] (in Spanish). University of Cantabria. ISBN 84-8102-112-1.

Predecessor: Guillermo Gómez Martínez-Conde	President of the Regional Assembly of Cantabria: 1987–1989	Successor: Adolfo Pajares
