= Dongo language (Nilo-Saharan) =

Kresh language of South Sudan

Dongo
- Native to: South Sudan
- Language family: Nilo-Saharan?: Central Sudanic?; Birri–Kresh; Kresh; Dongo

Language codes
- ISO 639-3: None (mis)
- Glottolog: dong1296

Linguistic map of the non-Arab peoples of Darfur, showing the extent of the Kresh languages in Sudan.

Dongo is a Kresh language of South Sudan, distinct enough to not be a dialect of Kresh.

The name Dongo is also used by several Ubangian languages.
