= Sillok =

Sillok can refer to:

- the Sillok people of Sudan
- Sillok is Korean for annual record. See Annals of the Joseon Dynasty
