= Molo language =

Nilo-Saharan language of Sudan

Molo
- Malkan
- Region: Sudan
- Ethnicity: Molo
- Native speakers: (100 cited 1988)
- Language family: Nilo-Saharan?: Eastern Sudanic; Eastern; Eastern Jebel; Aka–Kelo–Molo; Molo

Language codes
- ISO 639-3: zmo
- Glottolog: molo1257
- ELP: Molo
- Molo is classified as Critically Endangered by the UNESCO Atlas of the World's Languages in Danger.

Molo (Malkan) is a moribund Nilo-Saharan language spoken by a few of the Molo people of Sudan. It is considered "Critically Endangered" according to UNESCO's Atlas of the World's Languages in Danger, with around 100 speakers, according to data from 1988.
