= María José González =

María José González may refer to:

- María José González Revuelta (born 1972), Spanish politician
- María José González Ginestre, contestant in Miss Venezuela 2009
