= Kelo language =

Nilo-Saharan language spoken in Sudan

Kelo
- Kelo–Beni Sheko
- Native to: Sudan
- Region: Blue Nile State
- Ethnicity: Tornasi people
- Native speakers: 200 (2009)
- Language family: Nilo-Saharan?: Eastern Sudanic; Southern Eastern; Eastern Jebel; Aka–Kelo–Molo; Kelo
- Dialects: Kelo; Beni-Sheko

Language codes
- ISO 639-3: xel
- Glottolog: kelo1246
- ELP: Kelo
- Kelo is classified as Critically Endangered by the UNESCO Atlas of the World's Languages in Danger.

Kelo is a moribund Nilo-Saharan language spoken by the Tornasi people in Sudan.

A closely related variety called Beni Sheko has been documented by Bender (1997). Beni Sheko speakers consider themselves to be part of the same ethnic groups as Kelo speakers (Bender 1997: 190).
