= Sillok language =

Moribund Nilo-Saharan language of Sudan

Sillok
- Aka
- Region: Sudan
- Ethnicity: Sillok
- Native speakers: (300 cited 1983)
- Language family: Nilo-Saharan?: Eastern Sudanic; Eastern; Eastern Jebel; Aka–Kelo–Molo; Sillok

Language codes
- ISO 639-3: soh
- Glottolog: akaa1242
- ELP: Aka

Sillok (Aka) is a Nilo-Saharan language spoken by the Sillok people of Sudan. It is spoken by around 300 people in Blue Nile state, specifically on Mount Silak (Jebel Silak), southwest of the Ingessana hills.

According to Ethnologue the language is moribund, having been heavily Arabicised and influenced by the nearby Berta language. The Sillok people who speak the language are a remnant group.
