= Aja (name) =

Aja is both a surname and a given name; as the latter, it is sometimes rendered as A'ja. People with the name include:

== Surname ==
- Alexandre Aja (born 1978), French filmmaker
- David Aja, Spanish comic book artist
- Enrique Aja (born 1960), Spanish former professional racing cyclist
- Gonzalo Aja (born 1946), Spanish former road bicycle racer
- Isaac Aja (1936–2024), Spanish businessman and politician
- José Aja (born 1993), Uruguayan professional footballer
- Pablo Aja (born 1986), Mexican footballer

== Given name ==
- Aja Barber, American fashion activist and writer
- Aja Brown (born 1982), American politician
- Aja Evans (born 1988), American bobsledder
- Aja Huang (born 1978), Taiwanese computer scientist
- Aja Jerman (born 1999), Slovenian rhythmic gymnast
- Aja Kim, American singer and songwriter
- Aja Naomi King (born 1985), American actress
- Aja Monet (born 1987), American contemporary poet, writer, lyricist, and activist
- Aja Raden, an author, historian, scientist, and jewelry designer
- Aja Volkman (born 1980), American singer and songwriter
- Aja West, American musician
- A'ja Wilson (born 1996), American basketball player

== Stage name or nickname ==
- Aja (entertainer), stage name of Venus Nadya Oshun, American rapper, reality television personality and drag queen
- Aja Kong (born 1970), Japanese professional wrestler
- Seiya Inoue (baseball), Japanese baseball player

== See also ==
- Aja (disambiguation)
