= Molo people =

Molo is an ethnic group in Blue Nile state in Sudan. They number less than thousand and speak Molo, a Nilo-Saharan language. Most of them or all of them are Muslims.
