= Birri =

Birri may refer to:

- Birri language, a central Sudanic language of the Central African Republic
- Fernando Birri (1925–2017), Argentine filmmaker
- Birri Gubba people, an Aboriginal Australian people of northern Queensland
  - Biri language, their language

== See also ==
- Ouled Birri (Moorish tribe)
