= Ndrulo language =

Central Sudanic language of the DR Congo and Uganda

Ndrulo
- Northern Lendu
- Native to: Congo (DRC), Uganda
- Native speakers: 110,000 (2014–2018)
- Language family: Nilo-Saharan?: Central Sudanic; Eastern; Lenduic; Ndrulo

Language codes
- ISO 639-3: dno
- Glottolog: ndru1234

Ndrulo, or Northern Lendu, is an ethnolinguistic group of the Democratic Republic of the Congo and Uganda. Ndrukpa speakers call their language Ndrulo.
