= Tornasi people =

Sudanese ethnic group

Tornasi is an ethnic group in Sudan. They speak Kelo, an Eastern Sudanic language which has 200 speakers and is critically endangered. A more detailed division is Core languages, then Eastern Sudanic languages, Southern languages, Eastern Jebel languages, then Aka-Kelo-Molo. Beni Sheko speakers consider themselves to be part of the same ethnic group as Kelo speakers. They live in Geissan District, Blue Nile State, Sudan: Jebel Tornasi, Keeli village, and Beni Sheko. They live West of Berta-speaking people. Most are Muslims.
