= Kresh languages =

Central Sudanic language group of South Sudan

Kresh
- Kresh–Aja
- Geographic distribution: South Sudan
- Ethnicity: Kresh
- Linguistic classification: Nilo-Saharan?: Central Sudanic?; Birri–Kresh; Kresh
- Subdivisions: Aja; Kresh–Dongo

Language codes
- Glottolog: kres1240

Linguistic map of the non-Arab peoples of Darfur, showing the extent of the Kresh languages in Sudan.

Kresh is a small language group of South Sudan. It is generally considered to be a branch of the Central Sudanic languages. Boyeldieu (2010) judges that this has yet to be demonstrated satisfactorily, but Starostin (2016) finds convincing evidence, and that its closest relative within that family appears to be Birri.

Kresh is generally considered a dialect cluster, but it is dialectally diverse. Blench (2000 ms) lists five Kresh languages, four of which (Kresh, Gbaya, Woro, and Dongo) Ethnologue counts among seven dialects of Kresh/Gbaya (or eight, counting Aja). Kresh and Gbaya, however, are merely exonym and endonym, not coherent languages; They are equivalent to five varieties listed by Ethnologue. Ethnologue notes that the varieties are not mutually intelligible, but that Kresh-Ndogo (Gbaya-Ndogo) is universally understood as a prestige variety, and that Naka is also commonly understood as the most populous variety. Blench (2000) also includes Furu (Bagero) as a Kresh language, though Ethnologue classifies it as Kara.

In addition, Aja is spoken by ethnic Kresh, but though it remains Kresh grammatically, it has been relexified by the unrelated Banda languages (Santandrea 1976).

== Languages ==
Several Kresh varieties are not mutually intelligible:

- Aja (Gbaya)
- Kresh proper -- Ndogo (Gbaya) + Naka (Boro, Kpara) + Kresh-Hofra (Ngbongbo) + Woro (Orlo) (southernmost).
- Dongo (northernmost, close to Kresh proper)

The names Gbaya, Dongo and Ndogo are ambiguous, as they are also used for unrelated Ubangian languages.

Furu was once classified as Kresh, but is now recognized as Sara.
