= Javier López Estrada =

Spanish politician

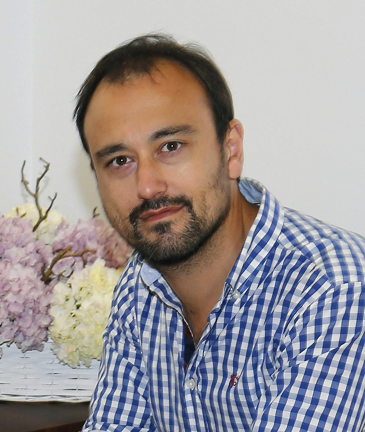
- López Estrada in 2015

Mayor of Torrelavega
- Incumbent
- Assumed office 15 June 2019
- Preceded by: José Manuel Cruz Viadero

Deputy in the Parliament of Cantabria
- Incumbent
- Assumed office 26 May 2019

Personal details
- Born: 28 December 1981 (age 44) Torrelavega, Spain
- Party: Regionalist Party of Cantabria
- Parent: Javier López Marcano (father)

Javier López Estrada (born 28 December 1981) is a Spanish politician of the Regionalist Party of Cantabria (PRC). He was elected mayor of Torrelavega in 2019, the same year as he was elected to the Parliament of Cantabria.

== Early and personal life ==
López Estrada was born in Torrelavega in Cantabria. His parents, Javier López Marcano (1955–2026) and Pilar Estrada, were active in the Regionalist Party of Cantabria (PRC). López Marcano was mayor of Torrelavega, tourism minister in the Government of Cantabria, and a deputy in the Parliament of Cantabria. López Estrada grew up with two sisters, and as of 2023 was married and had two children.

López Estrada qualified as an engineer, and then did a Master of Business Administration degree. He was self-employed before working for a construction company and as director of his own engineering company, and said that he would return to engineering after his political career.

== Political career ==
López Estrada's political activity began in the Juventudes Regionalistas de Cantabria, the youth wing of the PRC. In 2011, he was elected to the council in Torrelavega, and in 2014 his party entered government alongside the Spanish Socialist Workers' Party (PSOE) in a motion of no confidence; he was in charge of local development for the rest of the term. He was his party's mayoral candidate in 2015, becoming deputy mayor and in charge of public works.

In the 2019 local elections, López Estrada became mayor of Torrelavega with the support of the eight councillors of the PRC, the eight of the PSOE, and the one from Torrelavega Sí. Four years later, he was re-elected with the support of his seven councillors, the six of the PSOE and two from Torrelavega Sí; the People's Party received the most votes but also won seven seats in the 25-seat chamber.

In regional politics, López Estrada was fifth on the PRC list in the 2019 Cantabrian regional election, which with 14 deputies became the largest in the Parliament of Cantabria. In the 2023 election, he was in seventh and his father in third; the PRC fell to eight members of parliament while the PP grew to 15.

In March 2025, López Estrada submitted a candidacy to succeed Miguel Ángel Revilla as the PRC lead candidate in the next Cantabrian regional election. He did not achieve enough signatures to validate his candidacy, and Paula Fernández Viaña was ultimately elected.
