= Naomi Baki =

French-South Sudanese author and advocate

- Born: 1985 (age 39–40); Raga, Western Bahr el Ghazal, South Sudan
- Citizenship: South Sudan
- Occupation(s): Author, advocate
- Known for: Advocacy against child trafficking, fund-raising for women's education
- Notable work: Je suis encore vivante (2013)

Naomi Baki (born 1985) is a French-South Sudanese author and advocate for South Sudan. She is a native speaker of the Kresh language.

== Confronting child trafficking ==
Welcomed in France as a refugee in 2011 with her daughter Caroline, she became a French citizen in 2015. She has released an autobiography in 2013 (in French), in which she describes her long and difficult journey from bondage to freedom. This book, reviewed in English by scholar Sebastien Fath, has received a wide media coverage, including French TV France 3 and daily La Croix newspaper. As a motivational speaker, she has been invited in many schools, book fairs and churches to give her testimony. She has also started to travel abroad, including in Hungary and in the United States (Texas), where she is getting known as an advocate against child trafficking.

Naomi also wrote a book which carried the message of not being indifferent to other people. Her book "I am still alive" is based on the life of a young Sudanese girl.

== Fund raising for South Sudan ==
She has also been actively involved in fund-raising events for women's education in Wau, South Sudan (collaborating with the Episcopal Church of South Sudan). These initiatives have been recorded and praised in the Wau Diocese Journal (South Sudan). Not shy to speak about her Christian faith, she has been interviewed by the French Protestant website Regardsprotestants in May 2016, stating that being a refugee is not an identity. It is something transitional.

== Publications ==
As a self biography, she published the book Je suis encore vivante: Dix ans d'errance du Soudan à l'Europe.
