= Miguel Ángel Palacio García =

Spanish politician

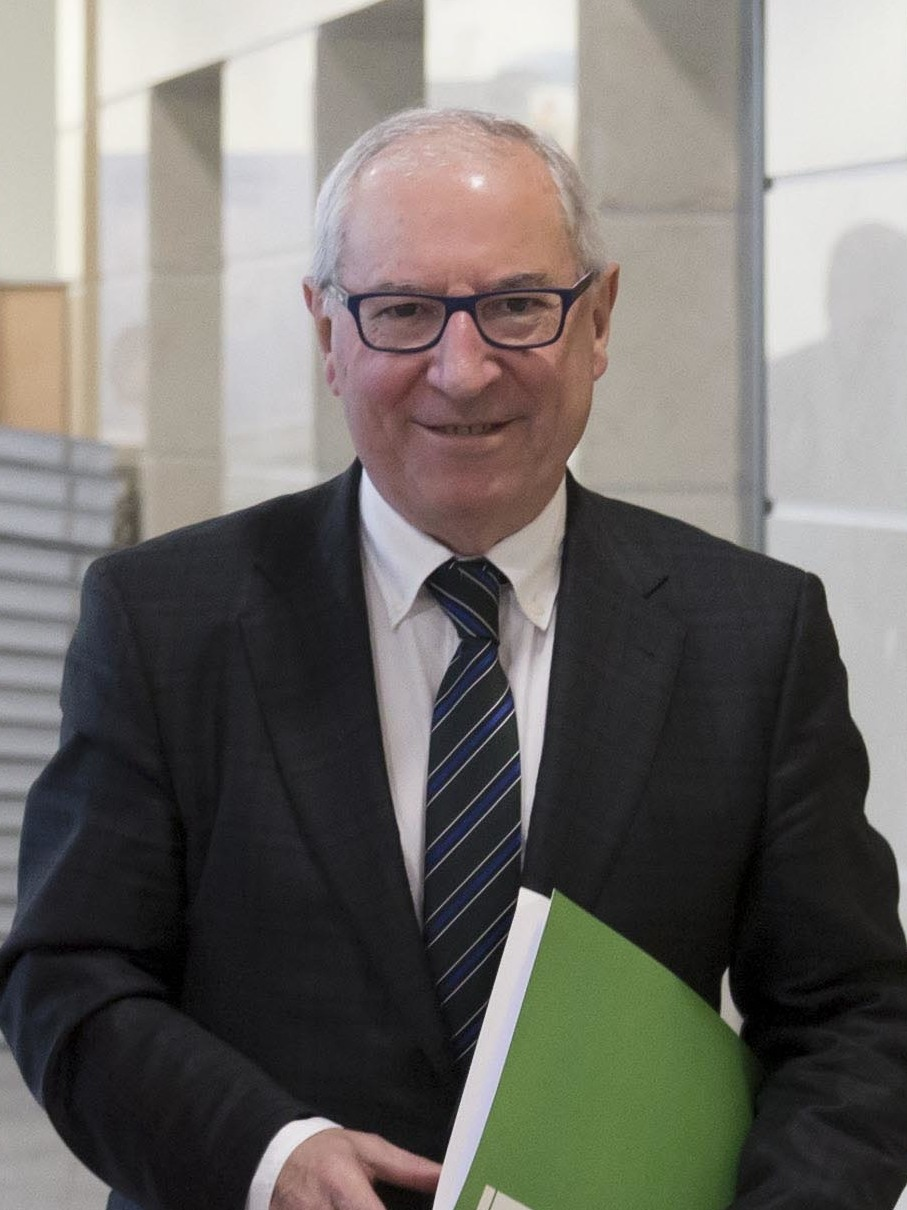
Miguel Ángel Palacio (2017).

Miguel Ángel Palacio García (born 3 March 1949 in Ganzo (Torrelavega) is a Spanish politician. He served as the President of the Parliament of Cantabria from 2003 to 2011, and was succeeded by José Antonio Cagigas.
