= CODECO =

Militia in the Democratic Republic of the Congo

Cooperative for the Development of the Congo
- Coopérative pour le développement du Congo
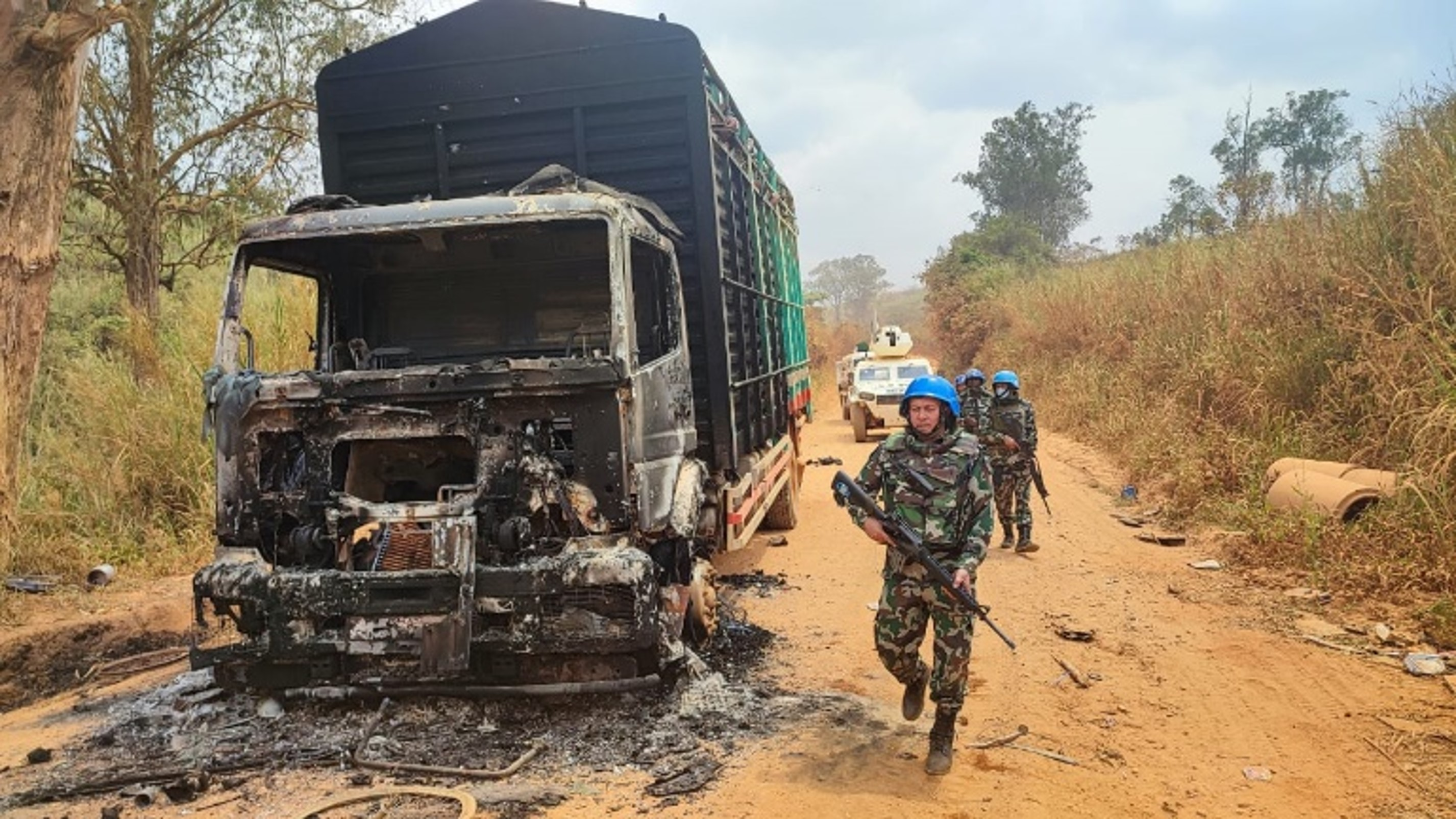
- A truck burnt by a CODECO attack in March 2022.
- Other name: CODECO
- Founding leader: Bernard Kakado until 2003
- Military leader: Justin Ngudjolo † ?–March 2020
- Religious leader: Ali Ngadjole Ngabu ?–present
- Dates active: 1970s–1999 (As agricultural cooperative); 1999–present (As coalition of rebel militias)
- Group: (Lendu)
- Headquarters: Ituri Province, D.R. Congo
- Active regions: Ituri Province, D.R. Congo
- Ideology: Lendu interests
- Status: Active (Ceasefire since August 2020)
- Size: 2,350 armed militiamen (Self-reported in June 2019)
- Wars: Ituri conflict

CODECO (French: Coopérative pour le développement du Congo, lit. 'Cooperative for the development of Congo') is a loose association of various Lendu militia groups operating within the Democratic Republic of the Congo. The name is an abbreviation of the group's lesser-known full name, the Cooperative for Development of the Congo, sometimes also styled the Congo Economic Development Cooperative.

The group was once a peaceful agricultural cooperative, before eventually transforming into an armed rebel movement. The movement was reorganized under different leaders several times, becoming looser and less cohesive as time went on. Several of the militias that claim CODECO affiliation stand accused of massacres and war crimes by United Nations officials. Today it is described variously as an armed political-religious sect, an association of Lendu militias or a political-military sect.

CODECO declared a unilateral ceasefire in August 2020; however, the group increased attacks in 2021–2022, leading the Government of the DRC to declare a State of Siege in the Ituri and North Kivu in response to various CODECO and Islamic State-DRC attacks and massacres.

== Background ==
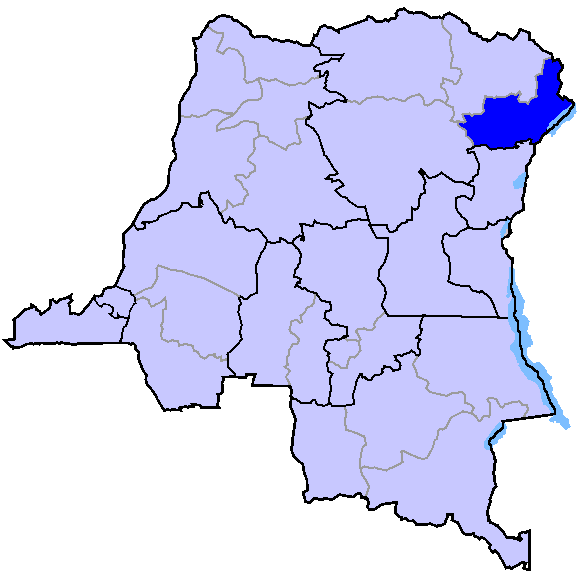
A map of the Ituri region, in which CODECO is active.

The group has its roots in the agriculturist Lendu communities of the Ituri Province. The Lendu are an ethnolinguistic group that found itself at odds with the pastoralist Hema people. The Hema had been favoured over the Lendu and received privileges during the Belgian colonial administration and later also by Zairean dictator Mobutu Sese Seko, leading to resentment amongst the Lendu, who felt that their property rights had been threatened by the Hema and their privileges, as well as discriminated against by the educational policies in place at the time. The Hema, for their part, largely avoided large-scale mobilizations against the Lendu, disbanded most of their armed groups and were generally seen as more inclined to negotiate.

== Religious elements ==
In modern times, CODECO has sometimes been described as a "cult" or "sect", though the UN Security Council notes that not all factions adhered to religious worship.

The UNSC describes the religious side of CODECO, which it calls the "CODECO cult", as a mixture of Animist and Christian rituals, later also sometimes combined with the worship of their late former leader Justin Ngudjolo.

According to a Congolese official cited by TRT World, the group's adherents worship every Monday and Thursday, when they do no farming – adding that the group bans certain vegetables and pork.

Pax, a Dutch NGO, stated that the movement had "discreetly" engaged in mysticism and fetishism. A 2020 AFP investigation concluded that CODECO had "two faces" – a military one, and one "steeped in mysticism and animism".

The religious side of the group is headed by a Ngadjole Ngabu, known as "the Sacrificer", who presented himself as a spiritual leader to a dominant branch of CODECO. He used his position to either order or forbid the carrying out of attacks by fighters under his command. He, alongside other CODECO fighters, met with a government peace delegation led by onetime local warlords from the early years of the conflict – which several sources cited by AFP reported had decreased the rate of massacres.

== History ==
=== Foundation ===
The group was initially founded in what was then Mobutu-led Zaire in the 1970s as a Lendu-based agricultural cooperative by Bernard Kakado, with the intention of promoting agriculture in the Walendu-Bindi chiefdom of the Irumu Territory of Ituri.

The group became a mouthpiece for Lendu demands, namely the reclamation of land allegedly taken by the Hema tribe and the refusal to accept foreign exploitation of local resources.

=== First Ituri War ===
During the 1999–2003 Ituri conflict, CODECO's founder Bernard Kakado instead began organizing an armed Lendu operation, before joining the Patriotic Resistance Front of Ituri (FRPI). At this point, CODECO ceased to exist as an agricultural cooperative. In 2003, the internationally led Operation Artemis succeeded in ending the violence between the Lendu and Hema groups, achieving a period of relative stability in the region. Neither CODECO or the various local militias ever completely dissolved and instead stockpiled weapons.

=== Return as armed group ===
In 2017, armed militia attacks began in Djugu, which local civilians attributed to CODECO. Congolese authorities stated that the group behind the attacks was led by Justin Ngudjolo, who had begun using the CODECO name to describe his militia, despite being linked to the Nationalist and Integrationist Front – another Lendu rebel group.

The reorganized CODECO once more echoed the same demands for property rights that had originally come to define the movement, but met criticism at the hands of prominent Lendu figures, which accused it of unjustified violence and outside manipulation.

=== 2019 disarmament talks ===
In mid 2019, the United Nations accused armed Lendu groups of mass killings of Hema civilians, but did not name CODECO directly. Shortly after one of the group's attacks, Congolese President Félix Tshisekedi pledged in July to "eliminate" it.

In September 2019, the group entered into negotiations with the Ituri regional government to cease its operations and disarm. The group offered to lay down its arms, so long as a disarmament deal gave amnesty to its members, provided CODECO fighters a right to join the Congolese Army with their current rank if they so choose, or disarm and be reintegrated into civilian life as part of a DDR campaign. The Ituri government did not immediately agree to the terms, but agreed to talks with CODECO, which were generally well received by the local communities.

The group's fighters entered into pre-disarmament cantonment shortly thereafter, but the peace process dragged on. Negotiations stalled and CODECO members were subjected to very poor living conditions and food shortages, which led to the formation of anti-ceasefire factions, which once more took up arms. Several hundred CODECO fighters remained in a run-down 'transit centre' for several weeks in January 2020, before they themselves also left, carrying with them the same weapons they entered with.

=== 2020 campaign, splits and ceasefire ===
In 2020, the group launched a series of large-scale attacks concurrently, though not necessarily in coordination, with various Congolese rebel and Islamist groups, which led to several thousand deaths. It and other Lendu militias suffered several setbacks in March, including the killing of its own leader Ngudjolo, In April, they went on the offensive, reasserting control over various localities in North-Eastern Congo. The death of its leader left CODECO splintered into different factions, some of which stood accused of carrying out atrocities against civilians.

In the following months, officials from the United Nations blamed several massacres described as "akin to crimes against humanity" on CODECO. What followed was an appeal by Congolese President Félix Tshisekedi for an end to the inter-ethnic conflict in the country. CODECO agreed and announced a unilateral ceasefire in August 2020.

In September 2020, about 100 heavily armed CODECO fighters entered the city of Bunia and demanded the release of several group members from a local prison. Security forces made no attempt to stop the fighters from entering the town. A UN source cited by Reuters reported that they had entered the city under escort from the Congolese police. An army spokesperson stated that there was no conflict and that the situation was under control, adding the CODECO fighters had only come to ask for better treatment and the release of prisoners. It was later revealed that the actual number of fighters involved was around 200, including video of child combatants, and that they belonged to the CODECO/ALC.

The September 4th gunmen belonging to CODECO enter to the city of Bunia, in the eastern of the country and protested for treatment during a continuing peace process and to demand the release of jailed fighters. The militants wore white headbands to distinguish each other, surrounding the prison to push for the release of their fighters.

Not all of the group's factions accepted the ceasefire. In late October, the CODECO/ALC faction joined forces with another rebel group to attack the town of Bunia. The attack was repelled by the joint forces of the Congolese Army and MONUSCO. MONUSCO reported killing 33 CODECO/ALC fighters and seizing two rebel strongholds, while also accusing CODECO of committing abuses against civilians and their property.

On November 4, militants attacked a military post in the Ezekere area, Ituri province, leaving five soldiers killed and five others seriously wounded. A senior military officer was among the fatalities. Further fighting was reported in nearby Bedu hours later.

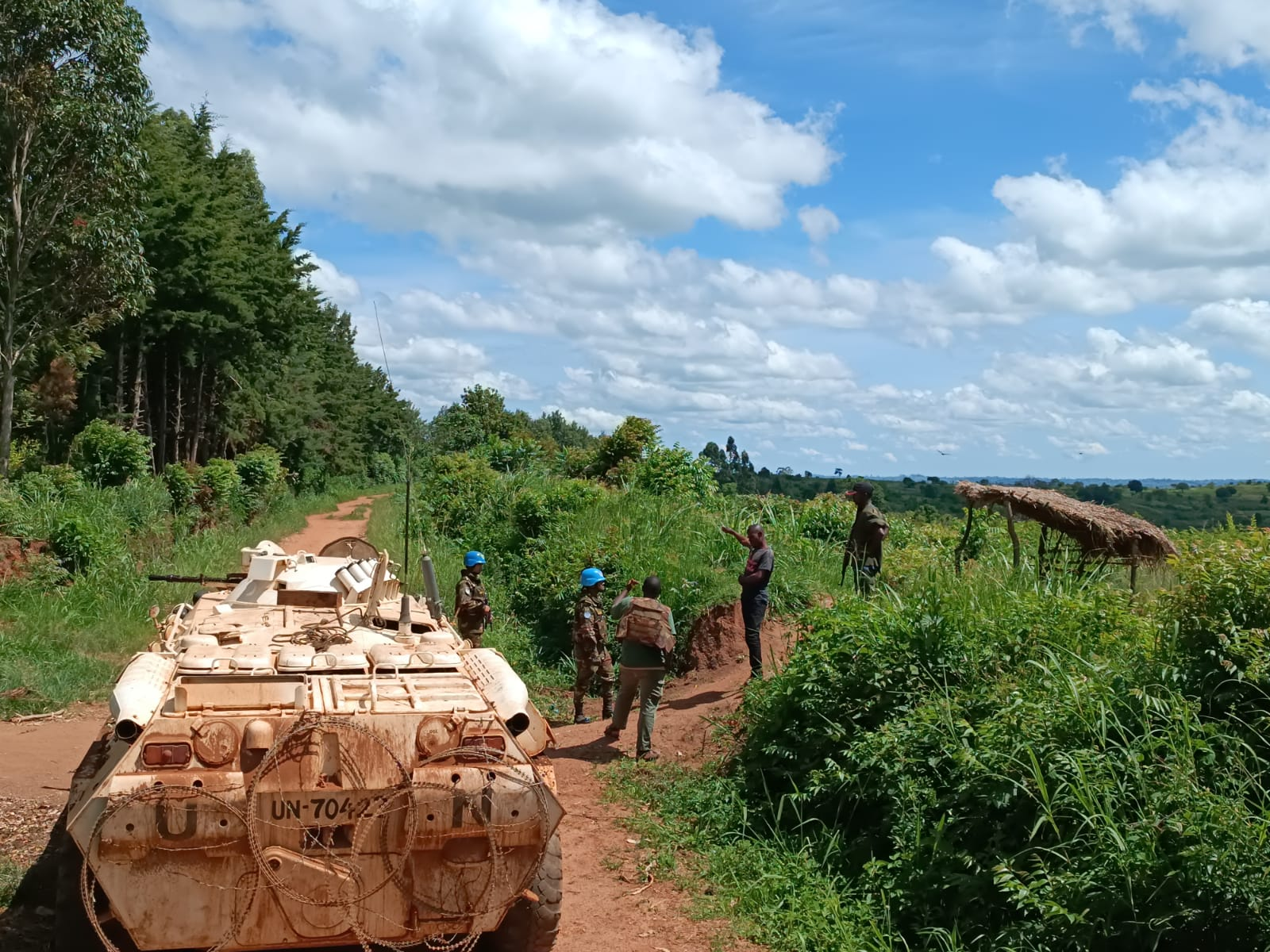
MONUSCO troops engaged against CODECO elements in Djugu Territory, May 2022.

CODECO increased attacks in 2021–2022. By 2023, the group was still clashing with rival militias and the military, and continued to raid villages. In doing so, it exploited the unrest caused by the an M23 offensive in the region. CODECO militiamen committed further war crimes, including the murder of civilians and hostages.

== Factions and splinters ==
Though CODECO was a decentralized organization from the beginning, factions became more common as time went on. Some of these factions split off from CODECO entirely, mostly in 2020, following the group's new campaign, the death of its leader and the subsequent ceasefire.

A UNSC's Security Council Report found that despite the ceasefire and concerted efforts by ex-combatants to demobilize the group's fighters, several of these factions had continued fighting as of December 2020, noting that only "some" of the CODECO's fighters had actually signed peace agreements with the government.

The following is a non-exhaustive list of some of the more notable factions and splinter movements that exist within or originated from CODECO:

- Union of Revolutionaries for the Defence of the Congolese People (URPDC) – formed in September 2018, it is a splinter group that was initially a part of, but later rejected affiliation with CODECO and its late former leader. Congolese authorities refused to recognize this new group and instead consider it only an extension of CODECO as a whole. The group has been led by Charité Nguna Kiza since late March 2020 and generally follows, with the exception of certain internal factions within itself, CODECO's blend of animist and Christian beliefs. It signed the unilateral ceasefire agreement in August 2020. The UN Security Council found that it had used child soldiers, which the group's leadership denied had been used in combat or in any URPDC or CODECO/ALC activities. It has cooperated with the CODECO/ALC.
- CODECO / Alliance for the Liberation of the Congo (CODECO/ALC) – it was the first faction to sign the unilateral peace agreement – on 15 July 2020, but later rejected the agreement, following the events at Bunia, and entered into fighting against Congolese authorities once more. CODECO/ALC rejoined the peace process in November 2020. It is led by a leader known as "Mountain Wolf" – later revealed to be Justin Maki Gesi. It has cooperated with the URPDC and was accused by the UN Security council of employing child soldiers.
- Sambaza (Kiswahili for 'to scatter') – a CODECO faction that became disillusioned with the disarmament process and continued fighting in early 2020, accused of carrying out violence against civilians.
