= Kresh language =

Central Sudanic language of South Sudan

Kresh
- Kresh-Ndogo
- Native to: South Sudan
- Native speakers: unknown: 16,000 including Dongo (2013)
- Language family: Nilo-Saharan?: Central Sudanic?; Birri–Kresh; Kresh languages; Kresh
- Dialects: Ndogo (Gbaya); Naka (Boro, Kpara); Kresh-Hofra (Gbaya-Ngbongbo); Woro (Orlo)

Language codes
- ISO 639-3: krs (Kresh–Gbaya–Woro–Dongo)
- Glottolog: gbay1288
- ELP: Gbaya

Kresh, also known ambiguously as Gbaya, is a Central Sudanic language of South Sudan.

Naomi Baki, a native Kresh speaker who became a French citizen in 2015, has released an autobiography in 2013 in which she describes her Kresh Gbaya environment in Raga County.

== Dialects ==
The Kresh varieties have varying mutual intelligibility, with northernmost Dongo being most distinct and southernmost Woro being next, though mutually intelligible with Kresh proper. 'Kresh' is what the people are called by their neighbors; they call themselves Gbaya, an ambiguous name in English, shared with many of the unrelated Gbaya languages.

- Ndogo (Gbaya)
- Naka (Boro, Kpara)
- Kresh-Hofra (Gbaya-Ngbongbo)
- Woro (Orlo)

Ndogo is the prestige dialect, and Naka the most populous.

== Locations ==
A 2013 survey reported that ethnic Kresh reside in Dar Seid Bandas and Kata Bomas, Ringi Payam, Raja County, South Sudan.
