= Sillok people =

Ethnic group in Sudan

Sillok are an ethnic group of Sudan, living in Blue Nile state. They speak the Sillok language (Aka), a Nilo-Saharan language, however most also speak Arabic. They are a subgroup of the Berta people and live on Mount Silak (Jebel Silak), also spelt Mount Sillok, which is south of the Ingessana hiills, near Keti.
