= Aja language (Nilo-Saharan) =

Central Sudanic language

Aja
- Native to: South Sudan, Central African Republic
- Ethnicity: Aja people
- Native speakers: (200 cited 1993)
- Language family: Nilo-Saharan?: Central Sudanic?; Birri–Kresh; Kresh; Aja

Language codes
- ISO 639-3: aja
- Glottolog: ajas1235
- ELP: Aja
- Linguistic map of the non-Arab peoples of Darfur, showing the extent of the Kresh languages in Sudan.

Aja is a Central Sudanic language spoken in the southern South Sudanese province of Bahr el Ghazal and along the South Sudanese border in the Central African Republic. Although the Aja are ethnically Kresh, their language is unintelligible to other Kresh languages. It is largely Banda in vocabulary, though it remains Kresh in structure. Most members of the tribe are bilingual in Kresh. Alternate spellings are Adja and Ajja.

== Phonology ==
Aja consonants
	Bilabial	Labiodental	Dental	Alveolar	Postalveolar	Retroflex	Palatal	Velar	Pharyngeal	Glottal
Plosive	p b ɓ			t d ɗ		ʈ ɖ	c ɟ	k ɡ		
Nasal	m			n			ɲ	ŋ		
Trill				r						
Tap or Flap		ⱱ		ɾ						
Affricate				ts			tɕ dʑ			
Fricative		f v	θ	s	ʃ ʒ			x ɣ	ħ ʕ	h
Approximant							j	w		
Lateral approximant				l						

=== Vowels ===
Aja vowels
	Front	Near-front	Central	Near-back	Back
Close	i				u
Near-close		ɪ		ʊ	
Close-mid	e				o
Mid					
Open-mid	ɛ				ɔ
Near-open			ɐ		
Open	a				
