= Kresh people =

Ethnic group

Kresh
Languages
- Kresh • Gbaya

Religion
- Predominantly; Islam; Minorities; Christianity and others

Linguistic map of the non-Arab peoples of Darfur, showing the extent of the Kresh languages in Sudan.

Kresh is the name of an ethnic minority in South Sudan, Sudan, and the Central African Republic (CAR). The Kresh is a grouping of many different ethnic groups originating from Western Bahr el Ghazal abd CAR. The Kresh speak various Kresh languages of the Nilo-Saharan phylum. The Kresh are mostly Muslims.

Kresh mainly live around Raga in the Kafia Kingi exclave and belong to the Fertit group.
