= Eastern Jebel languages =

Eastern Jebel
- Geographic distribution: Blue Nile, Sudan
- Linguistic classification: Nilo-Saharan?: Eastern Sudanic?; Southern Eastern?; Eastern Jebel
- Proto-language: Proto-Eastern Jebel
- Subdivisions: Gaam; Aka–Kelo–Molo

Language codes
- Glottolog: east2386
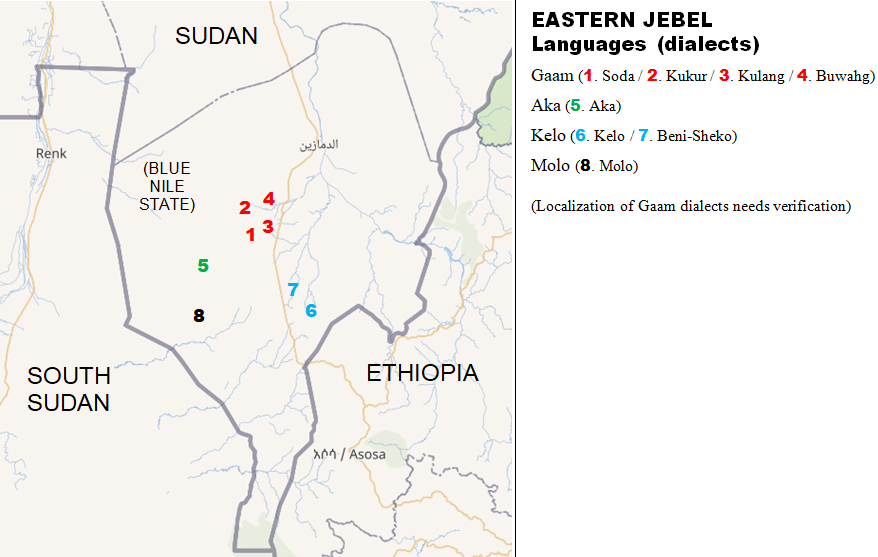
- Map of the Eastern Jebel Languages and dialects, in An Nil al Azraq province

The Eastern Jebel languages are a small subfamily belonging to the Eastern Sudanic subgroup of Nilo-Saharan. They are spoken in the hills of An Nil al Azraq province in eastern Sudan (the name "Jebel" is simply Arabic for "mountain".)

== Languages ==
The Eastern Jebel languages are:

- Gaam (also called "Ingassana" or "Tabi")
- Aka (Silak) †
- Kelo (Tornasi) †
- Molo (Malkan) †

Gaam has some 40,000–80,000 speakers, whereas the other three are threatened languages with far fewer speakers. Gaam was believed to be the only member of this group until more information about Aka, Kelo, and Molo was obtained by Bender; the latter three languages have been significantly influenced by Berta. Gaam is spoken in a compact area around the towns of Bau, Bobuk, Kukur, Gabanit, and Sawda in the Tabi Hills, roughly 11°15′–30′ N by 33°55′–34°10′ E.

The other three were spoken in isolated pockets to its south, but are now probably extinct: Aka in the Sillok Hills, Kelo in the Tornasi Hills on jebels Tornasi (Kayli village) and Beni Sheko, and Molo at Jebel Malkan near the Ethiopian border.

== Reconstruction ==
Proto-Eastern Jebel has been reconstructed by Bender (1998).

== See also ==
- List of Proto-Eastern Jebel reconstructions (Wiktionary)

== Bibliography ==
- Malik Agaar Ayre & M. Lionel Bender, Preliminary Gaam-English-Gaam Dictionary. Addis Abeba 1980.
- M. Lionel Bender. "The Eastern Jebel Languages of Sudan". Afrika und Übersee 80 (1997), 81 (1998):189-215, 39-64.
- W. J. Crewe. "The Phonological Features of the Ingessana Language". 1975
- E. E. Evans-Pritchard, "Ethnological Observations in Dar Fung", Sudan Notes and Records 15.1, 1932. pp. 1–61.
- F. S. & J. Lister. "The Ingessana Language: A Preliminary Description", Journal of Ethiopian Studies 4.1, 1966. pp. 41–44.
- B. Z. Seligman. "Notes on Two Languages Spoken in the Sennar Province of the Anglo-Egyptian Sudan", Zeitschrift für Kolonialsprachen 2.4, 1912. pp. 297–308.
- Timothy M. Stirtz. "Phonology and Orthography in Gaahmg", in ed. Leoma C. Gilley, Occasional Papers in the Study of Sudanese Languages No. 9, Entebbe: SIL-Sudan 2004.
- Sisto Verri. "Il Linguaggio degli Ingessana nell'Africa Occidentale", Anthropos 50, 1955. pp. 282–318.
