= Aja people (South Sudan) =

Ethnic group in South Sudan

Total population
- 200 (1993)

Regions with significant populations
- Western Bahr el Ghazal

Languages
- Aja

Religion
- Sunni Islam

Related ethnic groups
- Kresh

Aja are an ethnic group in the South Sudan state of Western Bahr el Ghazal. They mostly live along the upper reaches of the Sopo River.
