= List of presidents of the Parliament of Cantabria =

President of the Parliament of Cantabria
- Presidenta del Parlamento de Cantabria
- Flag of Cantabria
- Incumbent; María José González Revuelta since 22 June 2023
- Member of: Parliament of Cantabria
- Formation: 20 February 1982
- First holder: Isaac Aja

This article lists the presidents of the Parliament of Cantabria, the regional legislature of Cantabria.

== Presidents ==
No.	Name	Portrait	Party	Took office	Left office	^{Legs.}	^{Refs.}
1	Isaac Aja		Socialist Party of Cantabria	20 February 1982	27 May 1983	Prov.	
2	Guillermo Gómez		People's Coalition	27 May 1983	2 July 1987	1st	
3	Eduardo Obregón		Regionalist Party of Cantabria	3 July 1987	31 December 1989	2nd	
4	Adolfo Pajares		People's Party of Cantabria	2 February 1990	18 June 1991	2nd	
4	Adolfo Pajares		People's Party of Cantabria	18 June 1991	1 July 1995	3rd	
4	Adolfo Pajares		People's Party of Cantabria	1 July 1995	8 July 1999	4th	
5	Rafael de la Sierra		Regionalist Party of Cantabria	8 July 1999	19 June 2003	5th	
6	Miguel Ángel Palacio		Socialist Party of Cantabria	19 June 2003	21 June 2007	6th	
6	Miguel Ángel Palacio		Socialist Party of Cantabria	21 June 2007	16 June 2011	7th	
7	José Antonio Cagigas		People's Party of Cantabria	16 June 2011	18 June 2015	8th	
8	Lola Gorostiaga		Socialist Party of Cantabria	18 June 2015	20 June 2019	9th	
9	Joaquín Gómez		Socialist Party of Cantabria	20 June 2019		10th	
