= Arbeitskreis gemeinnütziger Jugendaustauschorganisationen =

- Abbreviation: AJA
- Formation: 1993
- Type: Umbrella organisation of non-profit youth exchange organisations
- Purpose: Promotion of long-term student exchange as a means for intercultural understanding
- Headquarters: Berlin
- Location: Germany
- Website: www.aja-org.de

Regardless of political or religious convictions, the Arbeitskreis gemeinnütziger Jugendaustauschorganisationen (AJA) is the umbrella organisation of non-profit youth exchange organisations in Germany that engage in the promotion of long-term student exchange as a means for intercultural understanding. In IJAB, the German department of international youth work, AJA is the only organisation that represents long-term student exchange.

== Development ==
AJA was founded in 1993. At that time, the organisations AFS Interkulturelle Begegnungen (see AFS Intercultural Programs), Deutsches Youth For Understanding (YFU) Komitee e.V.(see Youth For Understanding), Experiment e.V. and Partnership International e.V. aligned with each other on the basis of common quality criteria. In an annual job rotation, one of the directors of the AJA organisations acts as the official AJA Speaker. Since 2004, AJA has an own office in Berlin. Its director and AJA representative is Rita Stegen. On 1 July 2008 Rotary Jugenddienst e.V. (see Rotary International) joined AJA as its fifth member.

== Activities ==
AJA calls attention to the educational effects of one year high school student exchanges and actively assists its promotion. It decisively advocates quality control in international student exchange and generates, together with its members, common criteria that serve as a means of orientation for all those interested in youth exchange. In the context of enhancing general conditions of exchange programmes as well as improving recognition guidelines of school exchange years abroad, AJA closely cooperates with national and international actors of politics. In order to make student exchange possible in all countries and for all students, AJA distinctively emphasizes the importance to extend youth exchange with the new EU members and to launch financial support that is provided by political initiatives. Acting as an umbrella organisation, AJA's work always includes coordinating the cooperation and the communication among its members and representing them before media and politics. Furthermore, AJA works with various schools throughout Germany in order to promote intercultural learning as an integral part of school education. In the course of its work, AJA publishes statements, catalogues and information brochures with regard to different topics and continuously conducts various projects and conferences either as an organiser or as a cooperation partner. Extracts of publications and documentations are available on the AJA Homepage.

== Youth Exchange in AJA ==
By working both with its members and with external partners from different fields of social, political or economical life, AJA generally intends to accentuate and unfold the potentials of youth exchange in public awareness. In AJA, youth exchange means:

- personal development and professional qualification by acquiring social and intercultural skills,
- intercultural learning by reflecting thoroughly upon one's own and upon foreign cultural identities,
- international understanding by promoting a deeper comprehension and responsibility towards one's own and the foreign culture, and,
- finally, a contribution to foreign cultural politics since every young student may also be considered an ambassador of his/her host- and home country who accounts for a better intercultural dialogue in the future.

== Quality in Youth exchange ==
Based on the support of volunteers, all AJA members conduct worldwide, long-term, educational high school student exchange programmes. Regardless of the colour of the skin, of religious and political conviction, they intend to promote intercultural learning, understanding, responsibility, tolerance and respect for a different life style in order to contribute to peace and democracy in the world. AJA members cooperate on the basis of common criteria that shape the profile of each organisation. Quality in international youth exchange to AJA and its members means:

- to promote exchange worldwide by means of both sending and hosting programmes,
- to spend all financial resources in strict accordance with the principal of public utility, that is solely to the benefit of programme development, educational offers and scholarships,
- to execute volunteer work as an essential organisational principle,
- to guarantee careful selection and guidance before, during and after the exchange year for all program participants, and
- to provide for a complete transparency of costs and conditions.

These criteria are available as a Download.
