= Paula Fernández Viaña =

Spanish politician

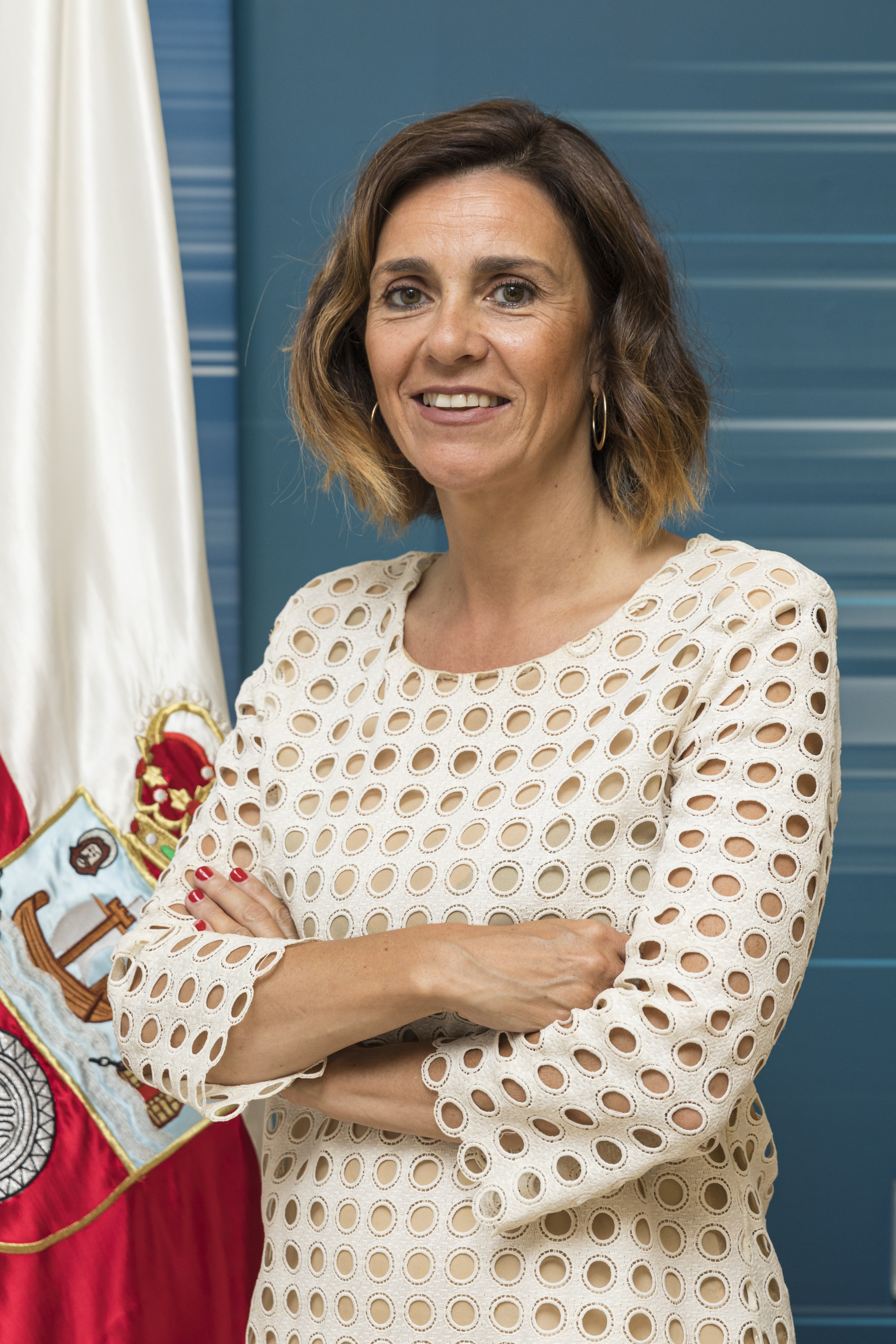

Paula Fernández Viaña (born 1971) is a Spanish politician of the Regionalist Party of Cantabria (PRC).

She was a town councillor in Bárcena de Pie de Concha (1999–2011) and was elected to the Parliament of Cantabria in 2015. She succeeded her mentor Rafael de la Sierra as Minister of the Presidency and Justice in 2019, becoming the first woman from her party to hold a ministry. In 2025, she was elected as her party's lead autonomous candidate.

== Biography ==
Born in Bárcena de Pie de Concha in Cantabria, Fernández Viaña graduated with a law degree from the University of Cantabria. Her father was a bullfighter and farmer who had briefly been a member of the Union of the Democratic Centre (UCD). When he was approached to stand for the Regionalist Party of Cantabria (PRC) in the 1999 local elections in the town, he turned down the opportunity but recommended her; the PRC won an absolute majority.

Also in 1999, Rafael de la Sierra wanted a secretary with legal qualifications and Fernández Viaña was hired to work for the PRC in the Parliament of Cantabria. In the 2015 Cantabrian regional election, she was elected, but resigned three days later as the party formed the government under its leader and President of Cantabria, Miguel Ángel Revilla; she was De la Sierra's Chief of Cabinet as he was Minister of the Presidency and Justice. At the end of 2018, she was elected the PRC's secretary of organisation.

In April 2019, Fernández Viaña succeeded De la Sierra due to his final illness, becoming the first woman to be a minister from the PRC. The party had held 15 prior ministries over 20 years in government, all held by men. Revilla remained regional president after the 2019 regional election, and named Fernández Viaña in the same ministry as before.

On 21 April 2025, Fernández Viaña launched her campaign to lead the PRC in the next Cantabrian regional election. She won the primary on 4 May with 65.3% of the votes against the mayor of Reocín, Pablo Diestro.

== Personal life ==
As of 2025, Fernández Viaña is married and has two children. She is a member at her hometown football club, SD Torina.
