= Ingessana people =

Ethnic group in Sudan

Total population
- 40,000-80,000 in 1997

Regions with significant populations
- Blue Nile

Languages
- Gaam

Religion
- Sunni Islam

Ingessana (Gaam, Gaahmg, Tabi) are the members of an African ethnic group of Sudan who speak the Gaam language. They live around the Tabi Hills, southwest of Ad-Damazin and northwest of Kurmuk in the Blue Nile Province. The capital of the Ingessana area is Bao, and the government offices are in Soda.

== Subgroups ==
There are 5 major subgroups of the Ingessana: the Jok Kulelek, Jok Gabanit or Bawoak, Jok Bulek, Jok Gor, and the Jok Tau. Each of these major subgroups of the Ingessana has an economic specialisation: the Jok Kulelek own great herds of livestock, the Jok Bulek are known for their farming capabilities, the Jok Gor are skilled weavers, the Jok Tau specialise in iron blacksmithing, and the Jok Gabanit or Bawoak which know by chilly planeting hard test called shada Gabanit which means chilly of Gabanit people.

== History ==
As Jedrej (1995) explains, the Gaahmg (Ingessana) have historically protected themselves and their hills from many invasions by outsiders. As a result, their culture is much more resistant to change than that of other ethnic groups of the southern Blue Nile region. Mainly self-sustaining in what they cultivate in the hill area, the Gaahmg are slow to grow cash crops or to migrate for wages. As a result of past conflict with Arabs and other invaders, they have a reputation of being hostile towards strangers and even refugees.

Although the origins of the Gaahmg are unclear, the Ingessena hills were alternately raided for several hundred years by the Funj sultans of Sennar to the northwest or by the Abyssinian kings of Gondar to the northeast, the Ingessena hills being a borderland between these kingdoms that plundered for slaves and gold. The Dinka and Nuer to the southwest raided the Gaahmg for cattle during times of drought or flooding in their own areas.

From 1820-1855, the ruling Turkish-Egyptian administration demanded heavy tributes of slaves and gold. When they did not receive their demands, they attacked and imprisoned the Gaahmg, taking several hundred prisoners at a time. The Gaahmg fought back with speed and surprise attacks, causing many attacks on them to be unsuccessful.

In 1888-1889, the Mahdist government raided the Funj area and the Ingessena hills in particular, to provide for Khartoum during a severe and widespread famine, taking 1000 head of cattle from the Gaahmg on one occasion. The Gaahmg made counter attacks and held Arabs captive for ransom at ten head of cattle per person.

From 1903-1934, the Anglo-Egyptian government continued a similar pattern of collecting tribute and squelching resistance. When the Gaahmg attacked tax patrols in protest to tribute collections, the Anglo-Egyptian government conducted ‘military operations’ which, although they did not involve taking slaves, seized livestock and killed those deemed responsible.

Since the 1980s, the state has become a major battleground for the ideological competition between two opposed models: Khartoum’s attempts at unifying and centralising the country with a dominant Arab-Islamic identity, which South Sudan’s separation is paradoxically reviving, versus the rebel SPLM/A’s and now SRF’s agenda for a more inclusive and devolved Sudan. Attempts to resolve Blue Nile’s past and current conflicts thus very much reflect Sudan’s existential dilemma as to how best it should define itself.

By the 1980s, land grabbing and exploitation by the centre led some in Blue Nile State to identify more with the South. In 1985, the newly formed SPLM/A was quick to send Southern troops and recruit from among local communities, including many Ingessana. Some of the most prominent leaders of SPLA-North are Ingessana, including Malik Agar.

As a result of on-going conflict, most of the Ingessana have since 2011 been displaced as refugees to South Sudan.

== Lifestyle ==
The main occupations of the Gaahmg relate to livestock, cultivation, or craftmaking. In particular, the Gaahmg grow sorghum, sesame, maize, peppers, gourds, and tobacco. They keep cattle, goats, pigs, sheep, hens, donkeys, mules, and camels. During the dry season, young men and boys take herds of up to 50 head of cattle a hundred miles south to the Yabus River for water and pasture.

The Gaahmg are also famous for their throwing knives, called koleth. There are two types of these, called "Sai" and "Muder".The designs on the blade are fixed and different for both the varieties. The "Muder" features a scorpion (deit) on the left side and an insect called fil on the other. Fil is a water insect and often stings people who are bathing but the pain is slight relative to that inflicted by a scorpion. The "Sai" also carries two creatures from nature, the snake (der) and the spider (maras) Both are represented on each side of the blade and spider four times in all, twice on each side. The shank and hilt of each variety are engraved with either pairs of small incisions (representing the footprints of a small deer, mofor) or parallel zig-zag lines called 'the millipede' (dongole) and sometimes combinations of both. The design here reflects the preference of the client or smith.

There are reported to be 78 hills in the area, some rising 300 meters above the surrounding flat plains. While the plains are grassland with occasional acacia trees, the vegetation in the hills has a much greater variety of plants and trees, with water sources even in the dry season. Their traditional religion is thought to be based on worship of the Sun, but there is a distinction from the physical phenomenon of the Sun ("tel") and the creator-deity "Tel". This confusion may be based on the fact that the Gaahmg language is tonal (that is, relative pitch is used to contrast between different words and/or different grammatical forms). Extensive research on the Gaahmg has been done by anthropologists Charles Jȩdrej and Akira Okazaki, the latter referring to them as "Gâmk".

Writing in 1941, the journalist George Steer, then an officer in the colonial British military force attempting to oust the Italians from Ethiopia, described the Ingessana in his account of the campaign:

Their hills are a freak outcrop of giant boulders piled one on top of the other to make an unfinished doll's house for the Ingessana. They themselves have pasted their particular cells out of a grey camouflage plaster on to this substructure, like a law-abiding colony of weaverbirds or wasps. But the Ingessana are superior to these social animals in that they have a sense of both humour and affection. When they see one they smile charmingly, one is not quite sure from which motive. Their skin is black and they are happy, but besides that they have few characteristics of the negro, for their features are regular and small like the mixture of Amhara and Galla that one meets in the Shoan countryside. They have their own tribal uniform which they do not abandon for the ways of Britain, Greece or Syria. Their long skirt or sarong is rolled tight over their buttocks and their hair is plaited back to fit the turn of their heads. Round their necks and plump, well-formed armes they wear thick plain bracelets and rings of bronze and a braided leather necklace with a sharp bronze bar pointing behind them and another long trailing necklace hanging in ingenious reverse down their backs. Their hair sometimes concludes in a Nelsonian queue, cased in leather and bronze. They carry two spears and balance on their easy shoulders, blade towards the sky, a magnificent curved and formal sword concave to the front of them. Their women are as free and sleek as they. They live round waterholes like dewponds in the rocks, ringed by the same grey clay as they sentryboxes they sleep in.

— George L. Steer, "Chapter VIII: The Route of Rolle", Sealed and Delivered (1942)

== Notable people ==
- Malik Agar
