= Lenduic languages =

Central Sudanic language cluster

Lenduic
- Geographic distribution: Democratic Republic of Congo
- Linguistic classification: Nilo-Saharan?: Central Sudanic; Eastern; Lenduic
- Subdivisions: Lendu (Balendru); Ngiti; Ndrulo

Language codes
- ISO 639-3: –
- Glottolog: lend1246

The Lenduic or Lendu–Ngiti languages of the Central Sudanic language family are a cluster of closely related languages spoken in the Democratic Republic of Congo, and slightly over the border into Uganda.

The languages are Lendu (Balendru), with over a million speakers, and the smaller Ngiti and Ndrulo, as well as perhaps an additional language or two among the 'dialects' of Balendru.

== See also ==
- Central Sudanic word lists (Wiktionary)
