= Gaam language =

Language

Gaam
- Ingessana
- Native to: Sudan
- Region: Blue Nile State
- Ethnicity: Ingessana
- Native speakers: 110,000 (2022)
- Language family: Nilo-Saharan?: Eastern Sudanic; Southern Eastern; Eastern Jebel; Gaam
- Writing system: Latin

Language codes
- ISO 639-3: tbi
- Glottolog: gaam1241

Gaam (Gaahmg), also known as Ingessana, (Me/Mun) Tabi, Kamanidi, or Mamedja/Mamidza, is an Eastern Sudanic language spoken by the Ingessana people in the Tabi Hills in Blue Nile State in eastern Sudan, near Ethiopia. It was considered an isolate within Eastern Sudanic until the other Eastern Jebel languages were discovered in the late 20th century. Dialects are Soda (Tao), Kukur (Gor), Kulang (Kulelek, Bau), Buwahg (Buek).

An early record of this language is a short wordlist dated February 1883 by Juan Maria Schuver. His informant came from the east side of the Tabi Hills, but was hard to understand because he was chewing tobacco.

== Phonology ==
=== Consonants ===
There are 21 distinct consonant phonemes. The fricative, nasal, lateral and rhotic consonants also distinguish length.

	Labial		Dental		Alveolar		Palatal		Velar	
Plosives	p	b	t̪	d̪	t	d	c	ɟ	k	ɡ
Fricatives	f, fː				s, sː					
Nasals		m, mː				n, nː		ɲ, ɲː		ŋ, ŋː
Laterals						l, lː				
Rhotics						r, rː				
Approximants		w				ð	j			

=== Vowels ===
There are six distinct vowel phonemes. All six can also occur in sequential (and thus lengthened) form but may change phonetic quality. Stirtz (2012) proposes the following system:

	[-round]		[+round]
	[-back]	[+back]	
[+ATR]	i	ə	u
[-ATR]	ɛ	a	ɔ

=== Tone ===
Gaam is a tonal language. There are three level tones, High, Mid and Low, which can be combined to form rising and falling tones. A total of nine tone melodies is possible, all of them contrastive.

== Bibliography ==
- Stirtz, Timothy (2004). "Phonology and orthography in Gaahmg". Occasional Papers in the Study of Sudanese Languages. 9: 127–144.
- Stirtz, Timothy (2012). A grammar of Gaahmg, a Nilo-Saharan language of Sudan (Ph.D. thesis). Rijksuniversiteit te Leiden. hdl:1887/18452. ISBN 978-94-6093-078-2.
