= Rafael de la Sierra =

Spanish politician (1948–2019)

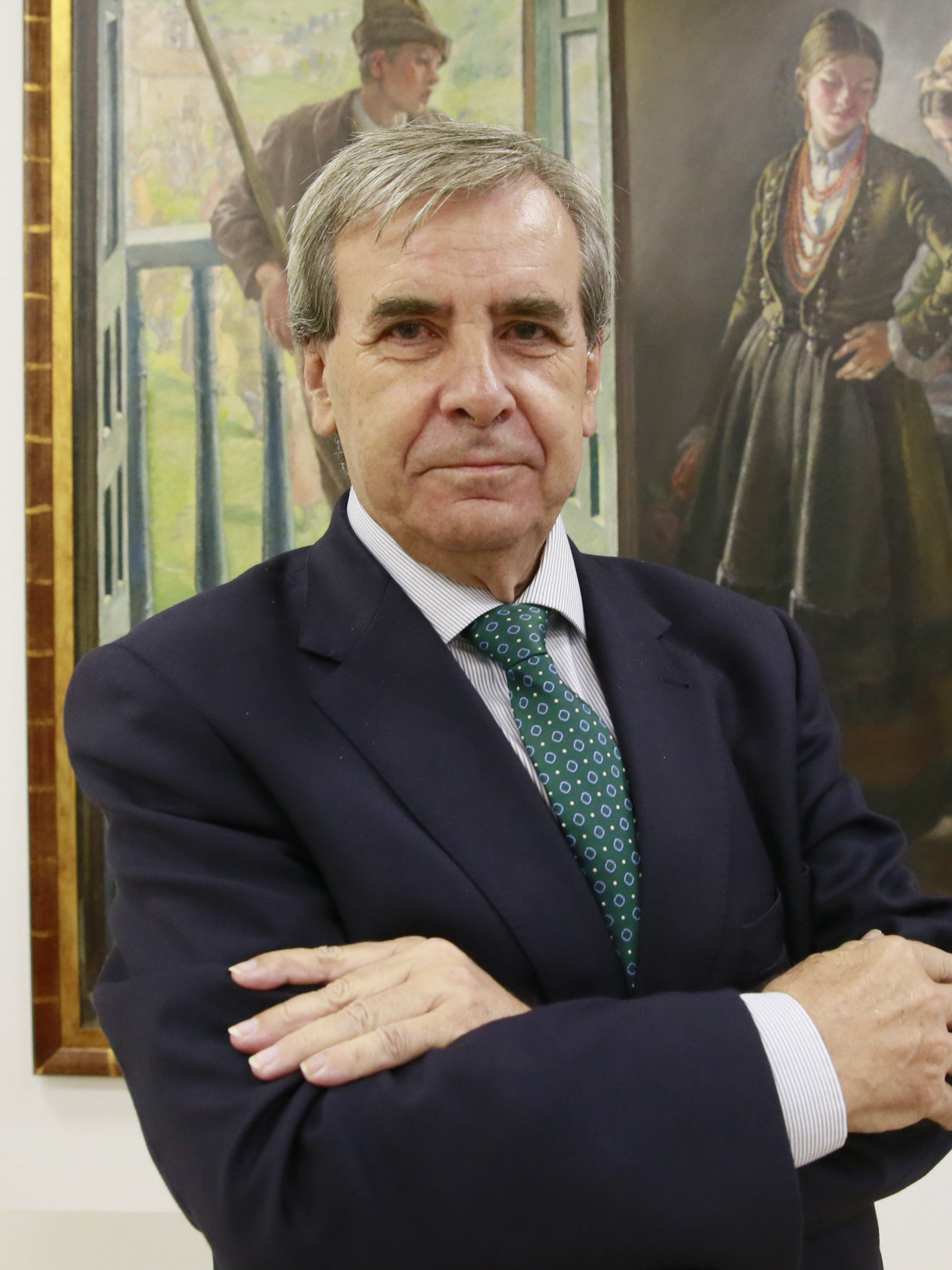
Sierra in 2017

Rafael de la Sierra González (20 September 1948 – 19 June 2019) was a Spanish politician for the Regionalist Party of Cantabria. A member of the Parliament of Cantabria, he served as the parliamentary president from 1999 to 2003. He was Minister of the Presidency and Justice of Cantabria from 2015 until resigning in April 2019 due to illness.

Sierra was born in Vioño de Piélagos, Piélagos, Cantabria. He was married and was the father of two children. He died on 19 June 2019, at the age of 70.
