= María José González Revuelta =

Spanish politician (born 1972)

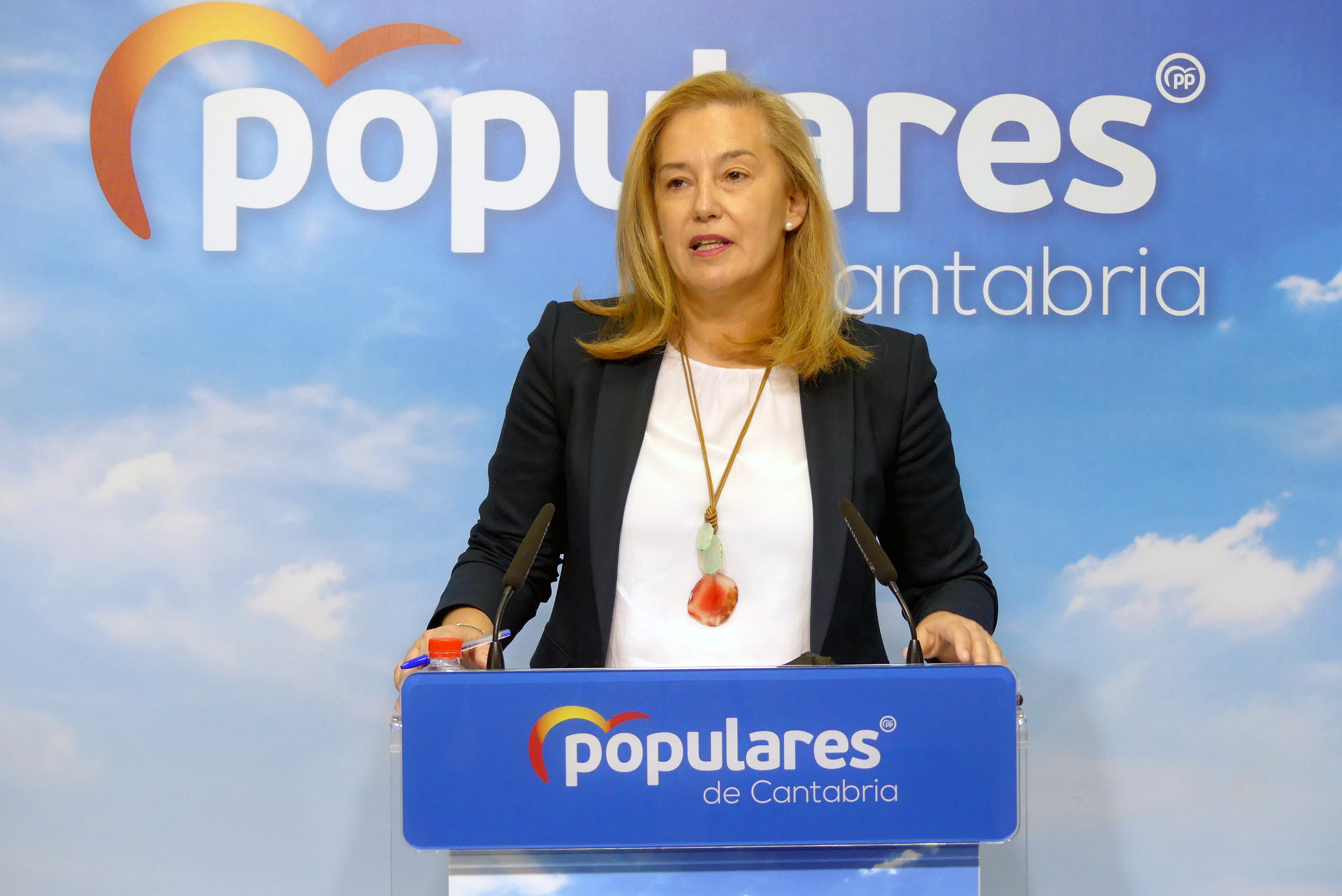
- González in 2022

President of the Parliament of Cantabria
- Incumbent
- Assumed office 22 June 2023
- Preceded by: Joaquín Gómez Gómez

Personal details
- Born: 26 April 1972 (age 53)
- Party: People's Party

María José González Revuelta (born 26 April 1972) is a Spanish politician serving as a member of the Parliament of Cantabria since 2019. She has served as president of the parliament since 2023.
