= Isaac Aja =

Spanish businessman and politician (1936–2024)

Member of the Senate of Spain for Cantabria
- In office 11 July 1986 – 29 October 1987

Personal details
- Born: Isaac Aja Muela; 2 March 1936 Santoña, Spain
- Died: 8 February 2024 (aged 87) San Vicente de la Barquera, Spain
- Party: PSC-PSOE
- Occupation: Businessman

Isaac Aja Muela (2 March 1936 – 8 February 2024) was a Spanish businessman and politician. A member of the Socialist Party of Cantabria, he served in the Senate from 1986 to 1987. He previously was president of the Provisional Assembly of Cantabria, between 1982 and 1983, during the constitution of the Cantabrian Autonomy.

Aja died in San Vicente de la Barquera on 8 February 2024, at the age of 87.
