= Birri language =

Language of the CAR

Birri
- Native to: Central African Republic
- Region: Haut-Mbomou
- Ethnicity: 5,000 in CAR (no date)
- Native speakers: (200 cited 1996) extinct in Sudan (1993)
- Language family: Nilo-Saharan?: Central Sudanic; Birri–Kresh; Birri
- Dialects: Mboto; Munga
- Writing system: Unwritten

Language codes
- ISO 639-3: bvq
- Glottolog: birr1240
- ELP: Birri

Birri (Bviri) is a nearly extinct, possibly Central Sudanic language of the Central African Republic (CAR) and South Sudan. According to Boyeldieu (2010), its classification as Central Sudanic has yet to be demonstrated, but Starostin (2016) finds its closest relative to be Kresh.

There are two main varieties of Birri, Mboto and Munga. In 1911, a few thousand people were reported in Rafaï, Central African Republic, with a marginal population further to the east in Obo. Stefano Santandrea (1966) wrote a lexicon and grammatical sketch of the Mboto dialect in Deim Zubeir, South Sudan. The Birri were not included in the maps of the old travellers. Schweinfurths's (1870-1872), Potago's (1876-1877) Buchta's. Birri name was included for the first time in Junker- Casati's map, drawn by F. Gessi, the son of the famous Pascha, Ramolo (1880-1888). De Calonne-Beaufaict in "Azande" (published in 1921) put the Birri in at the same place, as does in the British War Office map 1933, the spelling is seen as "Biri".

In the Birri language the morphological is very important which will lead to some part of speech necessary for usage in this language and how they compliment each other. However, nouns in the Birri language are pluralised by adding the suffix to the end of the word. The example is "ngu" the word 'ngura' (house) becomes 'ngurangu' houses in its plural form. Snntandrea (pg65-69) In some cases noun is used without prefix because i defers according to gender example in Kresh and Woro, owner = lukpu (plural). Meanwhile there is another word for owner = αgba which is always used in the normal meaning. e.g where is the owner of this house? εti bεbi (=αgbi) momα αɖé? (plural) yɔmi mɔmα ig(i) αɖé? In Aja it is 'prefix' αɲi, (plural) ä'bä.

Birri language does inflect verbs based on tense, aspect and mood. The verb can be classify into two Typical and Non-typical. Typical may have consonant combination representing just one sound. e.g ɔʃɔ, ɔjɔ. Non -typical is always consonant, vowel, consonant and vowel are usually at the first. It has the characteristics of typical verbs apart from the general behaviour. g place before the infinitive; (α)y(α) is a good example. Prefixes in Kresh and Woro -g(e), in Dongo it is I. Santandrea (pg129) The suffixes in Kresh are nine not in all constructions, αnda, αyα, αtα, αlα,αdα are the auxiliary verbs. In terms of mood the infinitive is always formed by the prefix g e.g to insult = g-ɔzo; to lick g-imi; the boy wants to break that pot = εti litά εbadi gɔƒi εti kαrα.

The system of independent subject pronouns in the birri language refers to the pronouns used to indicate the subject of a sentence without being attached to verb. These been told n and g need to be examined. 'n' this is connected to so many part of speech mostly in Aja and Baka. 'g' stylishly appear in Kresh affix igi, it is not common and it may be easily overlooked. The common in this language are ama-ngama; ume- ngumu; εte-ngete, αge-ngάgά; igέ-ngigi (igi-ngigi); igẻ-ngigi (igi-ngigi).

Birri does have adverb, it always decide the verbs, adjectives or other adverbs. The words give more information about where, when, or to what extent an action is happening. Most of the adjectives function as adverbs if it place after verb. Examples: ɔbi tέndε gɔzo = wash clothes well; gɔzɔ = good Santandrea (pg212)

Adjectives agree with the head noun in terms of number and gender, if the noun is plural the adjective will also be plural. If the noun is masculine or feminine, the adjective will match that gender as well. Adjective also canbe classified into two just like the verbs they are Typical and Non-typical. It could change the construction of the phrase within the same function.In a case where the case ends with ni the attributes determined the noun. As a predicate = stem + ne (=nε); g + stem (=ni) or (=nε). Santandrea(pg189).The Kresh prefer to say 'this is an old man" ɔzine?= is he good?; yes = yɔɔ, ɔzine; udjα ʖzinε = udjα gɔzi ndαkpα = the man is good.

The prepositions and postpositions helps to indicate relationships between different parts of a sentence. In this language Postpositions are that come before a noun or pronoun to show its relationship to another word in the sentence. Example in Kresh = 'bi, or bi. ɔdi 'bì άgbεdε (yα) = "(you) told (it) to whom?"; mɔɖi bi ng εri - ni ʃi = I told (it) to the chief; iɖji 'bi agbεɖε yα? = (you) gave (it) to whom?; bi g εs-εnɖe ni = to the girl. The declension of bi with personal pronouns: sing. bɑmɑ, bumu, bɛtɛ; pl. bαgα, bigi. Postpositions are similar to prepositions, but they come after the noun or pronoun. Example in Kresh = εɖε; rɔgi ύgu kά kɔwʖ = sweep place with broom. έnὶ kʖwi-ni, rʖgi ugu εɖε = take a broom and sweep the place.

Numerals: The numerals are very important when talking about languages and that is why we would be seeing some of the numbers in Biri and how it is pronounced. In Kresh: 1= 'bɑlɑ; 2 = rɔmo; 3 = tɔtʖ; 4 = sɔsɔ; 5 = sάlα; 6 = sάlèm'bɑlɑ; 7 = sάlèmrɔmo; 8 = sάlèmtɔtʖ; 9 = sάlèmsɔsɔ; 10 = kpúu; 11 = kpulem'bɑlɑ; 12 = kpulemrɔmo; 13 = kpulemtɔtʖ; 14 = kpulemsɔsɔ; 15 = kpuiʃisaluje; 16 = kpuiʃisalujelem'bɑlɑ; 17 = kpuiʃisalujelemrɔmo; 18 = kpuiʃisalujelemtɔtʖ; 19 = kpuiʃisalujelemsɔsɔ; 20 = gufu'bɑlɑ; 30 = gufurɔmo; 40 = gufurʖmo; 50 = gufusɑlɑ; 60 = gufusάlèm'bɑlɑ; 70 = gufusάlèmrɔmo; 80 = gufusάlèmtɔtʖ; 90 = gufusάlèmsɔsɔ.

Consonants: Consonants are speech sounds that involve blocking the air before it leaves the mouth, such as with the tongue, lips, or throat. In this context we have to start from Liabel 'b It is the plosion that is different in energy from language to another language. It is strong in Aja and Kresh, compared to Aja and Ndogo where it is weaker. e.g earth = Kresh - Gbaya: bubu; Kresh-Naka - bubu; Woro = 'bu'bu. br is a compound symbol adopted for Baka, because it represent a peculiar sound with no relationship with in the kindred languages like Bongo, Yulu-Biηa and Kara. Santandrea (pg46-47). ƒ p is a common words example; ƒ for fire, lung(s), shoulder (=ƒundu). Only one word with p, lẻpẻ, "to open", but possibly are more.There is distinction between two consonants. ṿ is a voiced labio-dental flapped consonant pronounced by thrusting the lower lip under the upper teeth, it is found languages, in Baka where the language are scarce. e.g kuṿi = to pop out; ɖέṿẻ kesi = (he) broke an iron. ɖ, t these two are dental but not really in Ndogo, Italian and so on. It is carefully checked, it can be commonly disregarded in ordinary writing. Example of the words that are dental are tέdέ = different; tεndε = clothe(s); utύ = stop, on = tread on; tɔƒo = bowel(s). s. We should look at this consonant in Kresh and Aja where it has the usual sound, it is uncertain in some languages like Baka and Bongo. It is pronounced in some words, s and c are interchangeable, in few cases ʃ is pronounced instead of s weak thou. Some are pronounced e.g. c: 'dici = hut; cikά = smoke; cikα = story, fable; s: sili = hand; sili = shade; wind = sili, ʃili, ʃilα. d, ɖ. this two consonants are dental - alveolar and the relationship or comparison could be seen here, they are partly mixed up. examples are: ɖ = Kresh, Golo-Banda; mɔɖɔ. ɖy, ty are classified as palatal- plosive they have same sound a ɖ and t as in due and tune, z(=ɖz) it is common in all the languages, ts also same sound as z (=ɖz). Santandrea (pg48-49). A vowel sound is a speech sound that is pronounced without the lips, tongue, teeth or throat blocking the air produced when uttering the letters. The vowel sounds are α, u, i, e, o; α, u, i are pronounced as exactly in Italian; e is pronounced as ε clearly open "e" in monosyllables and in the first syllable of disyllable s, whenever it is accented it sound moderately close, it also sound o in some cases. e and o closeness of vowels does not guaranty the distinction between the words in some languages. Santandrea (pg29) "The degeneration in the pronunciation of vowels must have started in old times, for reason unknown to us, then gradually developed by itself, as phenomena do.

CONSONANTS
	BILABIAL	LABIO- DENTAL	DENTAL	ALVEOLA	POST-ALVEOLA	RETROFLEX
PLOSIVE	Ρ b			ʈ d		ʈ ɖ
NASAL	m	ɱ		n		
TRILL	B			r		
TAP OR FLAP				ɾ		
FERICATIVE	ɸ β	f v	θ ð	S Z	ʃ ӡ	
LATERAL FRICATIVE				ɬ ɮ		
APPROXIMANT		ʋ		ɹ		ɻ
LATERAL APPROXIMANT				l		ɭ

VOWELS
	Front	Central	Back
close	i		u
close-mid			
Open-mid			
Open	ɛ(e)	o	α
