= 2003 Spanish local elections in Cantabria =

This article presents the results breakdown of the local elections held in Cantabria on 25 May 2003. The following tables show detailed results in the autonomous community's most populous municipalities, sorted alphabetically.

== City control ==
The following table lists party control in the most populous municipalities, including provincial capitals (highlighted in bold). Gains for a party are highlighted in that party's colour.

Municipality	Population	Previous control	New control
**Santander**	184,661	People's Party (PP)	People's Party (PP)
Torrelavega	56,180	Regionalist Party of Cantabria (PRC)	Spanish Socialist Workers' Party (PSOE)

== Municipalities ==
=== Santander ===
Population: 184,661

← Summary of the 25 May 2003 City Council of Santander election results →
Parties and alliances	Popular vote			Seats	
Parties and alliances	Votes	%	±pp	Total	+/−
People's Party (PP)	48,602	47.68	+1.36	**15**	±0
Spanish Socialist Workers' Party (PSOE)	31,295	30.70	−1.16	**9**	−1
Regionalist Party of Cantabria (PRC)	12,732	12.49	+4.98	**3**	+1
United Left of Cantabria (IUC)	4,070	3.99	−0.73	0	±0
Cantabrian Unity (UCn)	659	0.65	New	0	±0
Cantabrian Nationalist Council (CNC)	640	0.63	+0.08	0	±0
Democratic and Social Centre (CDS)	229	0.22	−0.25	0	±0
Independent Spanish Phalanx–Phalanx 2000 (FEI–FE 2000)	166	0.16	New	0	±0
Humanist Party (PH)	121	0.12	−0.02	0	±0
Blank ballots	3,427	3.36	−1.36		
**Total**	**101,941**			**27**	**±0**
Valid votes	101,941	99.30	+0.11		
Invalid votes	715	0.70	−0.11		
**Votes cast / turnout**	**102,656**	**63.60**	**+4.68**		
Abstentions	58,747	36.40	−4.68		
**Registered voters**	**161,403**				

=== Torrelavega ===
Population: 56,180

← Summary of the 25 May 2003 City Council of Torrelavega election results →
Parties and alliances	Popular vote			Seats	
Parties and alliances	Votes	%	±pp	Total	+/−
Spanish Socialist Workers' Party (PSOE)	13,827	38.89	+1.58	**11**	+1
Regionalist Party of Cantabria (PRC)	8,234	23.16	−1.01	**7**	±0
People's Party (PP)	8,166	22.97	−2.47	**6**	−1
United Left of Cantabria (IUC)	2,081	5.85	+0.80	**1**	±0
Cantabrian Unity (UCn)	1,619	4.55	New	0	±0
Independent Citizens (CCII)	290	0.82	−1.78	0	±0
Democratic and Social Centre (CDS)	290	0.82	−0.82	0	±0
Cantabrian Nationalist Council (CNC)	194	0.55	New	0	±0
Humanist Party (PH)	57	0.16	−0.01	0	±0
Blank ballots	799	2.25	−0.20		
**Total**	**35,557**			**25**	**±0**
Valid votes	35,557	98.95	−0.05		
Invalid votes	379	1.05	+0.05		
**Votes cast / turnout**	**35,936**	**74.54**	**+2.26**		
Abstentions	12,277	25.46	−2.26		
**Registered voters**	**48,213**				

== See also ==
- 2003 Cantabrian regional election
