= 2007 Spanish local elections in Cantabria =

This article presents the results breakdown of the local elections held in Cantabria on 27 May 2007. The following tables show detailed results in the autonomous community's most populous municipalities, sorted alphabetically.

== City control ==
The following table lists party control in the most populous municipalities, including provincial capitals (shown in bold). Gains for a party are displayed with the cell's background shaded in that party's colour.

Municipality	Population	Previous control	New control
**Santander**	182,926	People's Party (PP)	People's Party (PP)
Torrelavega	56,143	Spanish Socialist Workers' Party (PSOE)	Spanish Socialist Workers' Party (PSOE)

== Municipalities ==
=== Santander ===
Population: 182,926

← Summary of the 27 May 2007 City Council of Santander election results →
Parties and alliances	Popular vote			Seats	
Parties and alliances	Votes	%	±pp	Total	+/−
People's Party (PP)	51,177	51.95	+4.27	**15**	±0
Spanish Socialist Workers' Party (PSOE)	25,174	25.55	−5.15	**7**	−2
Regionalist Party of Cantabria (PRC)	16,977	17.23	+4.74	**5**	+2
United Left (IU)	1,822	1.85	−2.14	0	±0
The Union (LU)	503	0.51	New	0	±0
Council (Conceju)	328	0.33	−0.30	0	±0
Internationalist Solidarity and Self-Management (SAIn)	199	0.20	New	0	±0
Humanist Party (PH)	139	0.14	+0.02	0	±0
Liberal Democratic Centre (CDL)	107	0.11	New	0	±0
Communist Party of the Peoples of Spain (PCPE)	107	0.11	New	0	±0
Blank ballots	1,984	2.01	−1.35		
**Total**	**98,517**			**27**	**±0**
Valid votes	98,517	99.41	+0.11		
Invalid votes	585	0.59	−0.11		
**Votes cast / turnout**	**99,102**	**64.22**	**+0.62**		
Abstentions	55,219	35.78	−0.62		
**Registered voters**	**154,321**				

=== Torrelavega ===
Population: 56,143

← Summary of the 27 May 2007 City Council of Torrelavega election results →
Parties and alliances	Popular vote			Seats	
Parties and alliances	Votes	%	±pp	Total	+/−
Spanish Socialist Workers' Party (PSOE)	12,556	38.34	−0.55	**10**	−1
People's Party (PP)	8,526	26.03	+3.06	**7**	+1
Regionalist Party of Cantabria (PRC)	8,047	24.57	+1.41	**7**	±0
Citizens' Assembly for Torrelavega (ACPT)	1,681	5.13	New	**1**	+1
Assembly for Cantabria (IU–BR)^{1}	823	2.51	−3.34	0	−1
Liberal Democratic Centre (CDL)	142	0.43	New	0	±0
Council (Conceju)	128	0.39	−0.16	0	±0
Engine and Sports Alternative (AMD)	94	0.29	New	0	±0
Humanist Party (PH)	49	0.15	−0.01	0	±0
Blank ballots	704	2.15	−0.10		
**Total**	**32,750**			**25**	**±0**
Valid votes	32,750	99.06	+0.11		
Invalid votes	310	0.94	−0.11		
**Votes cast / turnout**	**33,060**	**71.39**	**−3.15**		
Abstentions	13,248	28.61	+3.15		
**Registered voters**	**46,308**				
Sources
Footnotes: ^{1} Assembly for Cantabria results are compared to United Left of Cantabria totals in the 2003 election.

== See also ==
- 2007 Cantabrian regional election
