= 1999 Spanish local elections in Cantabria =

This article presents the results breakdown of the local elections held in Cantabria on 13 June 1999. The following tables show detailed results in the autonomous community's most populous municipalities, sorted alphabetically.

== City control ==
The following table lists party control in the most populous municipalities, including provincial capitals (highlighted in bold). Gains for a party are highlighted in that party's colour.

Municipality	Population	Previous control	New control
**Santander**	184,165	People's Party (PP)	People's Party (PP)
Torrelavega	57,493	Spanish Socialist Workers' Party (PSOE)	Regionalist Party of Cantabria (PRC)

== Municipalities ==
=== Santander ===
Population: 184,165

← Summary of the 13 June 1999 City Council of Santander election results →
Parties and alliances	Popular vote			Seats	
Parties and alliances	Votes	%	±pp	Total	+/−
People's Party (PP)	42,659	46.32	+9.25	**15**	+4
Spanish Socialist Workers' Party (PSOE)	29,344	31.86	+8.29	**10**	+3
Regionalist Party of Cantabria (PRC)	6,914	7.51	−5.29	**2**	−1
United Left of Cantabria (IUC)	4,350	4.72	−5.09	0	−3
Union for the Progress of Cantabria (UPCA)	2,588	2.81	−9.42	0	−3
Cantabrian Nationalist Council (CNC)	504	0.55	New	0	±0
Centrist Union–Democratic and Social Centre (UC–CDS)	430	0.47	+0.04	0	±0
Unemployed Collective of Cantabria (COPARCA)	402	0.44	New	0	±0
Spanish Democratic Party (PADE)	271	0.29	New	0	±0
The Phalanx (FE)	164	0.18	New	0	±0
Humanist Party (PH)	125	0.14	New	0	±0
Blank ballots	4,350	4.72	+2.29		
**Total**	**92,101**			**27**	**±0**
Valid votes	92,101	99.19	+0.05		
Invalid votes	751	0.81	−0.05		
**Votes cast / turnout**	**92,852**	**58.92**	**−5.79**		
Abstentions	64,727	41.08	+5.79		
**Registered voters**	**157,579**				

=== Torrelavega ===
Population: 57,493

← Summary of the 13 June 1999 City Council of Torrelavega election results →
Parties and alliances	Popular vote			Seats	
Parties and alliances	Votes	%	±pp	Total	+/−
Spanish Socialist Workers' Party (PSOE)	12,868	37.31	+2.85	**10**	±0
People's Party (PP)	8,775	25.44	−4.96	**7**	−1
Regionalist Party of Cantabria (PRC)	8,338	24.17	+10.27	**7**	+3
United Left of Cantabria (IUC)	1,743	5.05	−5.19	**1**	−1
Independent Citizens (CCII)	898	2.60	+0.82	0	±0
Centrist Union–Democratic and Social Centre (UC–CDS)	565	1.64	−0.27	0	±0
Union for the Progress of Cantabria (UPCA)	403	1.17	−3.92	0	−1
Humanist Party (PH)	60	0.17	New	0	±0
Blank ballots	844	2.45	+0.52		
**Total**	**34,494**			**25**	**±0**
Valid votes	34,494	99.00	−0.37		
Invalid votes	347	1.00	+0.37		
**Votes cast / turnout**	**34,841**	**72.28**	**−7.08**		
Abstentions	13,362	27.72	+7.08		
**Registered voters**	**48,203**				

== See also ==
- 1999 Cantabrian regional election
