= 1995 Spanish local elections in Cantabria =

This article presents the results breakdown of the local elections held in Cantabria on 28 May 1995. The following tables show detailed results in the autonomous community's most populous municipalities, sorted alphabetically.

== City control ==
The following table lists party control in the most populous municipalities, including provincial capitals (highlighted in bold). Gains for a party are highlighted in that party's colour.

Municipality	Population	Previous control	New control
**Santander**	194,822	People's Party (PP)	People's Party (PP)
Torrelavega	59,759	Spanish Socialist Workers' Party (PSOE)	Spanish Socialist Workers' Party (PSOE)

== Municipalities ==
=== Santander ===
Population: 194,822

← Summary of the 28 May 1995 City Council of Santander election results →
Parties and alliances	Popular vote			Seats	
Parties and alliances	Votes	%	±pp	Total	+/−
People's Party (PP)	37,679	37.07	+17.96	**11**	+5
Spanish Socialist Workers' Party (PSOE)	23,961	23.57	−8.55	**7**	−3
Regionalist Party of Cantabria (PRC)	13,014	12.80	+7.85	**3**	+3
Union for the Progress of Cantabria (UPCA)	12,435	12.23	−18.40	**3**	−7
United Left of Cantabria (IUC)	9,975	9.81	+4.77	**3**	+2
Independents of Cantabria (INCA)	909	0.89	New	0	±0
Cantabria Renewal Coalition (CR–CA)	627	0.62	New	0	±0
Democratic and Social Centre (CDS)	438	0.43	−1.69	0	±0
Spanish Phalanx of the CNSO (FE–JONS)	143	0.14	New	0	±0
Neighbourhood Group of Cantabria (AAVV–C)	0	0.00	−1.88	0	±0
Blank ballots	2,473	2.43	−0.19		
**Total**	**101,654**			**27**	**±0**
Valid votes	101,654	99.14	+0.12		
Invalid votes	878	0.86	−0.12		
**Votes cast / turnout**	**102,532**	**64.71**	**+3.19**		
Abstentions	55,911	35.29	−3.19		
**Registered voters**	**158,443**				

=== Torrelavega ===
Population: 59,759

← Summary of the 28 May 1995 City Council of Torrelavega election results →
Parties and alliances	Popular vote			Seats	
Parties and alliances	Votes	%	±pp	Total	+/−
Spanish Socialist Workers' Party (PSOE)	12,383	34.46	−5.90	**10**	−2
People's Party (PP)	10,926	30.40	+13.52	**8**	+3
Regionalist Party of Cantabria (PRC)	4,994	13.90	+6.35	**4**	+2
United Left (IU)	3,679	10.24	+2.30	**2**	±0
Union for the Progress of Cantabria (UPCA)	1,828	5.09	−8.57	**1**	−3
Democratic and Social Centre (CDS)	688	1.91	−3.03	0	±0
Independent Citizens (CCII)	640	1.78	New	0	±0
Independents of Cantabria (INCA)	107	0.30	New	0	±0
Blank ballots	694	1.93	−0.04		
**Total**	**35,939**			**25**	**±0**
Valid votes	35,939	99.37	+0.21		
Invalid votes	228	0.63	−0.21		
**Votes cast / turnout**	**36,167**	**79.36**	**+7.60**		
Abstentions	9,407	20.64	−7.60		
**Registered voters**	**45,574**				

== See also ==
- 1995 Cantabrian regional election
