= 2015 Spanish local elections in Cantabria =

This article presents the results breakdown of the local elections held in Cantabria on 24 May 2015. The following tables show detailed results in the autonomous community's most populous municipalities, sorted alphabetically.

== City control ==
The following table lists party control in the most populous municipalities, including provincial capitals (shown in bold). Gains for a party are displayed with the cell's background shaded in that party's colour.

Municipality	Population	Previous control	New control
**Santander**	175,736	People's Party (PP)	People's Party (PP)
Torrelavega	54,196	Spanish Socialist Workers' Party (PSOE)	Spanish Socialist Workers' Party (PSOE)

== Municipalities ==
=== Santander ===
Population: 175,736

← Summary of the 24 May 2015 City Council of Santander election results →
Parties and alliances	Popular vote			Seats	
Parties and alliances	Votes	%	±pp	Total	+/−
People's Party (PP)	36,040	40.77	−15.47	**13**	−5
Spanish Socialist Workers' Party (PSOE)	15,518	17.55	+0.60	**5**	±0
Regionalist Party of Cantabria (PRC)	13,616	15.40	+0.76	**4**	±0
Citizens–Party of the Citizenry (C's)	7,370	8.34	New	**2**	+2
Let's Win Santander Can (GSSP)	6,029	6.82	New	**2**	+2
United Left (IU)	4,863	5.50	+1.04	**1**	+1
Union, Progress and Democracy (UPyD)	1,048	1.19	−1.58	0	±0
Commitment to Cantabria (CxCAN)	786	0.89	New	0	±0
Vox (Vox)	611	0.69	New	0	±0
For Santander Yes (Sí)	512	0.58	New	0	±0
Engine and Sports Alternative (AMD)	217	0.25	+0.01	0	±0
Internationalist Solidarity and Self-Management (SAIn)	143	0.16	−0.15	0	±0
The National Coalition (LCN)	138	0.16	New	0	±0
Humanist Party (PH)	136	0.15	−0.10	0	±0
Blank ballots	1,381	1.56	−1.04		
**Total**	**88,408**			**27**	**±0**
Valid votes	88,408	98.76	+0.38		
Invalid votes	1,114	1.24	−0.38		
**Votes cast / turnout**	**89,522**	**64.30**	**−2.57**		
Abstentions	49,694	35.70	+2.57		
**Registered voters**	**139,216**				

=== Torrelavega ===
Population: 54,196

← Summary of the 24 May 2015 City Council of Torrelavega election results →
Parties and alliances	Popular vote			Seats	
Parties and alliances	Votes	%	±pp	Total	+/−
People's Party (PP)	7,182	24.48	−10.46	**7**	−3
Spanish Socialist Workers' Party (PSOE)	5,874	20.02	−7.64	**6**	−2
Regionalist Party of Cantabria (PRC)	5,192	17.69	−5.26	**5**	−1
Torrelavega Yes (Torrelavega Sí)	3,689	12.57	New	**4**	+4
Citizens' Assembly for Torrelavega (ACPT)	2,382	8.12	+1.46	**2**	+1
Torrelavega Can (Torrelavega Puede)	1,570	5.35	New	**1**	+1
Citizens–Party of the Citizenry (C's)	1,349	4.60	New	0	±0
United Left (IU)	1,151	3.92	+1.68	0	±0
Equo (Equo)	259	0.88	New	0	±0
Union, Progress and Democracy (UPyD)	153	0.52	−0.72	0	±0
Engine and Sports Alternative (AMD)	101	0.34	+0.04	0	±0
Blank ballots	441	1.50	−0.82		
**Total**	**29,343**			**25**	**±0**
Valid votes	29,343	97.97	−0.08		
Invalid votes	607	2.03	+0.08		
**Votes cast / turnout**	**29,950**	**69.71**	**−2.88**		
Abstentions	13,014	30.29	+2.88		
**Registered voters**	**42,964**				

== See also ==
- 2015 Cantabrian regional election
