= 2011 Spanish local elections in Cantabria =

This article presents the results breakdown of the local elections held in Cantabria on 22 May 2011. The following tables show detailed results in the autonomous community's most populous municipalities, sorted alphabetically.

== City control ==
The following table lists party control in the most populous municipalities, including provincial capitals (shown in bold). Gains for a party are displayed with the cell's background shaded in that party's colour.

Municipality	Population	Previous control	New control
**Santander**	181,589	People's Party (PP)	People's Party (PP)
Torrelavega	55,888	Spanish Socialist Workers' Party (PSOE)	People's Party (PP) (PSOE in 2014)

== Municipalities ==
=== Santander ===
Population: 181,589

← Summary of the 22 May 2011 City Council of Santander election results →
Parties and alliances	Popular vote			Seats	
Parties and alliances	Votes	%	±pp	Total	+/−
People's Party (PP)	52,657	56.24	+4.29	**18**	+3
Spanish Socialist Workers' Party (PSOE)	15,874	16.95	−8.60	**5**	−2
Regionalist Party of Cantabria (PRC)	13,703	14.64	−2.59	**4**	−1
United Left (IU)	4,175	4.46	+2.61	0	±0
Union, Progress and Democracy (UPyD)	2,596	2.77	New	0	±0
National Front (FrN)	661	0.71	New	0	±0
The Union (LU)	503	0.54	+0.03	0	±0
Internationalist Solidarity and Self-Management (SAIn)	294	0.31	+0.11	0	±0
For a Fairer World (PUM+J)	270	0.29	New	0	±0
Humanist Party (PH)	232	0.25	+0.11	0	±0
Engine and Sports Alternative (AMD)	229	0.24	New	0	±0
Blank ballots	2,436	2.60	+0.59		
**Total**	**93,630**			**27**	**±0**
Valid votes	93,630	98.38	−1.03		
Invalid votes	1,542	1.62	+1.03		
**Votes cast / turnout**	**95,172**	**66.87**	**+2.65**		
Abstentions	47,150	33.13	−2.65		
**Registered voters**	**142,322**				

=== Torrelavega ===
Population: 55,888

← Summary of the 22 May 2011 City Council of Torrelavega election results →
Parties and alliances	Popular vote			Seats	
Parties and alliances	Votes	%	±pp	Total	+/−
People's Party (PP)	10,968	34.94	+8.91	**10**	+3
Spanish Socialist Workers' Party (PSOE)	8,683	27.66	−10.68	**8**	−2
Regionalist Party of Cantabria (PRC)	7,203	22.95	−1.62	**6**	−1
Citizens' Assembly for Torrelavega (ACPT)	2,092	6.66	+1.53	**1**	±0
United Left (IU)^{1}	702	2.24	−0.27	0	±0
Union, Progress and Democracy (UPyD)	388	1.24	New	0	±0
Torrelavega Matters Policy (TI)	245	0.78	New	0	±0
National Front (FrN)	240	0.76	New	0	±0
Engine and Sports Alternative (AMD)	95	0.30	+0.01	0	±0
Humanist Party (PH)	46	0.15	±0.00	0	±0
Blank ballots	729	2.32	+0.17		
**Total**	**31,391**			**25**	**±0**
Valid votes	31,391	98.05	−1.01		
Invalid votes	624	1.95	+1.01		
**Votes cast / turnout**	**32,015**	**72.59**	**+1.20**		
Abstentions	12,087	27.41	−1.20		
**Registered voters**	**44,102**				
Sources
Footnotes: ^{1} United Left results are compared to Assembly for Cantabria totals in the 2007 election.

== See also ==
- 2011 Cantabrian regional election
