= 1991 Spanish local elections in Cantabria =

This article presents the results breakdown of the local elections held in Cantabria on 26 May 1991. The following tables show detailed results in the autonomous community's most populous municipalities, sorted alphabetically.

== City control ==
The following table lists party control in the most populous municipalities, including provincial capitals (highlighted in bold). Gains for a party are highlighted in that party's colour.

Municipality	Population	Previous control	New control
**Santander**	194,221	People's Party (PP)	People's Party (PP)
Torrelavega	59,997	Spanish Socialist Workers' Party (PSOE)	Spanish Socialist Workers' Party (PSOE)

== Municipalities ==
=== Santander ===
Population: 194,221

← Summary of the 26 May 1991 City Council of Santander election results →
Parties and alliances	Popular vote			Seats	
Parties and alliances	Votes	%	±pp	Total	+/−
Spanish Socialist Workers' Party (PSOE)	28,808	32.12	+0.07	**10**	±0
Union for the Progress of Cantabria (UPCA)	27,472	30.63	New	**10**	+10
People's Party (PP)^{1}	17,141	19.11	−25.63	**6**	−7
United Left (IU)	4,519	5.04	+1.19	**1**	+1
Regionalist Party of Cantabria (PRC)	4,443	4.95	−2.96	0	−2
Democratic and Social Centre (CDS)	1,897	2.12	−6.06	0	−2
Neighbourhood Group of Cantabria (AAVV–C)	1,688	1.88	New	0	±0
Ecologist–Humanist List (LE–H)^{2}	720	0.80	+0.42	0	±0
Communist Party of the Peoples of Spain (PCPE)	348	0.39	New	0	±0
Nationalist Party of Cantabria (PNC)	293	0.33	New	0	±0
Blank ballots	2,352	2.62	+0.91		
**Total**	**89,681**			**27**	**±0**
Valid votes	89,681	99.02	+0.35		
Invalid votes	891	0.98	−0.35		
**Votes cast / turnout**	**90,572**	**61.52**	**−9.20**		
Abstentions	56,640	38.48	+9.20		
**Registered voters**	**147,212**				
Sources
Footnotes: ^{1} People's Party results are compared to the combined totals of People's Alliance and People's Democratic Party in the 1987 election.; ^{2} Ecologist–Humanist List results are compared to Humanist Platform totals in the 1987 election.

=== Torrelavega ===
Population: 59,997

← Summary of the 26 May 1991 City Council of Torrelavega election results →
Parties and alliances	Popular vote			Seats	
Parties and alliances	Votes	%	±pp	Total	+/−
Spanish Socialist Workers' Party (PSOE)	13,125	40.36	+3.03	**12**	+1
People's Party (PP)^{1}	5,491	16.88	−5.37	**5**	±0
Union for the Progress of Cantabria (UPCA)	4,441	13.66	New	**4**	+4
United Left (IU)	2,583	7.94	−0.08	**2**	±0
Regionalist Party of Cantabria (PRC)	2,456	7.55	−3.75	**2**	−1
Torrelavega Assembly Bloc (BAT)	1,624	4.99	−1.29	0	−1
Democratic and Social Centre (CDS)	1,607	4.94	−6.02	0	−3
Ecologist–Humanist List (LE–H)^{2}	555	1.71	+1.15	0	±0
Blank ballots	640	1.97	+0.39		
**Total**	**32,522**			**25**	**±0**
Valid votes	32,522	99.16	+0.73		
Invalid votes	275	0.84	−0.73		
**Votes cast / turnout**	**32,797**	**71.76**	**−5.43**		
Abstentions	12,909	28.24	+5.43		
**Registered voters**	**45,706**				
Sources
Footnotes: ^{1} People's Party results are compared to the combined totals of People's Alliance and People's Democratic Party in the 1987 election.; ^{2} Ecologist–Humanist List results are compared to Humanist Platform totals in the 1987 election.

== See also ==
- 1991 Cantabrian regional election
