= 1979 Spanish local elections in Cantabria =

This article presents the results breakdown of the local elections held in Cantabria on 3 April 1979. The following tables show detailed results in the autonomous community's most populous municipalities, sorted alphabetically.

== City control ==
The following table lists party control in the most populous municipalities, including provincial capitals (highlighted in bold).

Municipality	Population	New control
**Santander**	174,809	Union of the Democratic Centre (UCD)
Torrelavega	54,512	Spanish Socialist Workers' Party (PSOE)

== Municipalities ==
=== Santander ===
Population: 174,809

Summary of the 3 April 1979 City Council of Santander election results →
Parties and alliances	Popular vote			Seats	
Parties and alliances	Votes	%	±pp	Total	+/−
Union of the Democratic Centre (UCD)	25,266	33.78	n/a	**10**	n/a
Spanish Socialist Workers' Party (PSOE)	17,556	23.47	n/a	**7**	n/a
Regionalist Party of Cantabria (PRC)	10,416	13.93	n/a	**4**	n/a
Right Independent Group (AID)	8,941	11.95	n/a	**3**	n/a
Communist Party of Spain (PCE)	6,476	8.66	n/a	**2**	n/a
Party of Labour of Cantabria (PTC)	4,486	6.00	n/a	**1**	n/a
Spanish Socialist Workers' Party (historical) (PSOEh)	977	1.31	n/a	0	n/a
Spanish Phalanx of the CNSO (Authentic) (FE–JONS(A))	432	0.58	n/a	0	n/a
Revolutionary Communist League (LCR)	246	0.33	n/a	0	n/a
Blank ballots	0	0.00	n/a		
**Total**	**74,796**			**27**	**n/a**
Valid votes	74,796	98.83	n/a		
Invalid votes	882	1.17	n/a		
**Votes cast / turnout**	**75,678**	**59.17**	**n/a**		
Abstentions	52,222	40.83	n/a		
**Registered voters**	**127,900**				

=== Torrelavega ===
Population: 54,512

Summary of the 3 April 1979 City Council of Torrelavega election results →
Parties and alliances	Popular vote			Seats	
Parties and alliances	Votes	%	±pp	Total	+/−
Spanish Socialist Workers' Party (PSOE)	7,543	28.71	n/a	**7**	n/a
Union of the Democratic Centre (UCD)	5,017	19.10	n/a	**5**	n/a
Independent Popular Candidacy (CPI)	4,828	18.38	n/a	**5**	n/a
Communist Party of Spain (PCE)	2,535	9.65	n/a	**2**	n/a
Democratic Coalition (CD)	2,383	9.07	n/a	**2**	n/a
Workers' Revolutionary Organization (ORT)	2,004	7.63	n/a	**2**	n/a
Regionalist Party of Cantabria (PRC)	1,963	7.47	n/a	**2**	n/a
Party of Labour of Cantabria (PTC)	0	0.00	n/a	0	n/a
Blank ballots	0	0.00	n/a		
**Total**	**26,273**			**25**	**n/a**
Valid votes	26,273	98.99	n/a		
Invalid votes	268	1.01	n/a		
**Votes cast / turnout**	**26,541**	**64.29**	**n/a**		
Abstentions	14,742	35.71	n/a		
**Registered voters**	**41,283**				
