= 1983 Spanish local elections in Cantabria =

This article presents the results breakdown of the local elections held in Cantabria on 8 May 1983. The following tables show detailed results in the autonomous community's most populous municipalities, sorted alphabetically.

== City control ==
The following table lists party control in the most populous municipalities, including provincial capitals (highlighted in bold). Gains for a party are highlighted in that party's colour.

Municipality	Population	Previous control	New control
**Santander**	179,694	Union of the Democratic Centre (UCD)	People's Coalition (AP–PDP–UL)
Torrelavega	56,490	Spanish Socialist Workers' Party (PSOE)	Spanish Socialist Workers' Party (PSOE)

== Municipalities ==
=== Santander ===
Population: 179,694

← Summary of the 8 May 1983 City Council of Santander election results →
Parties and alliances	Popular vote			Seats	
Parties and alliances	Votes	%	±pp	Total	+/−
People's Coalition (AP–PDP–UL)^{1}	52,994	57.35	+45.40	**17**	+14
Spanish Socialist Workers' Party (PSOE)	30,390	32.89	+9.42	**10**	+3
Communist Party of Spain (PCE)	3,504	3.79	−4.87	0	−2
Regionalist Party of Cantabria (PRC)	2,113	2.29	−11.64	0	−4
Democratic and Social Centre (CDS)	1,077	1.17	New	0	±0
Independents (INDEP)	822	0.89	New	0	±0
Independents (INDEP)	785	0.85	New	0	±0
Cantabrian Liberal Democratic Party (PDLC)	412	0.45	New	0	±0
Ecologist Movement of Spain (MEE)	301	0.33	New	0	±0
Union of the Democratic Centre (UCD)	n/a	n/a	−33.78	0	−10
Party of Labour of Cantabria (PTC)	n/a	n/a	−6.00	0	−1
Blank ballots	0	0.00	±0.00		
**Total**	**92,398**			**27**	**±0**
Valid votes	92,398	100.00	+1.17		
Invalid votes	0	0.00	−1.17		
**Votes cast / turnout**	**92,398**	**68.78**	**+9.61**		
Abstentions	41,943	31.22	−9.61		
**Registered voters**	**134,341**				
Sources
Footnotes: ^{1} People's Coalition results are compared to Right Independent Group totals in the 1979 election.

=== Torrelavega ===
Population: 56,490

← Summary of the 8 May 1983 City Council of Torrelavega election results →
Parties and alliances	Popular vote			Seats	
Parties and alliances	Votes	%	±pp	Total	+/−
Spanish Socialist Workers' Party (PSOE)	13,646	46.30	+17.59	**15**	+8
People's Coalition (AP–PDP–UL)^{1}	7,142	24.23	+15.16	**7**	+5
Communist Party of Spain (PCE)	2,807	9.52	−0.13	**3**	+1
Independents (INDEP)	1,469	4.98	New	0	±0
Democratic and Social Centre (CDS)	1,033	3.50	New	0	±0
Independents (INDEP)	813	2.76	New	0	±0
Regionalist Party of Cantabria (PRC)	662	2.25	−5.22	0	−2
Independents (INDEP)	643	2.18	New	0	±0
Cantabrian Liberal Democratic Party (PDLC)	627	2.13	New	0	±0
Independents (INDEP)	482	1.64	New	0	±0
Ecologist Movement of Spain (MEE)	150	0.51	New	0	±0
Union of the Democratic Centre (UCD)	n/a	n/a	−19.10	0	−5
Independent Popular Candidacy (CPI)	n/a	n/a	−18.38	0	−5
Workers' Revolutionary Organization (ORT)	n/a	n/a	−7.63	0	−2
Blank ballots	0	0.00	±0.00		
**Total**	**29,474**			**25**	**±0**
Valid votes	29,474	100.00	+1.01		
Invalid votes	0	0.00	−1.01		
**Votes cast / turnout**	**29,474**	**73.15**	**+8.86**		
Abstentions	10,819	26.85	−8.86		
**Registered voters**	**40,293**				
Sources
Footnotes: ^{1} People's Coalition results are compared to Democratic Coalition totals in the 1979 election.

== See also ==
- 1983 Cantabrian regional election
