= 2023 Spanish local elections in Cantabria =

This article presents the results breakdown of the local elections held in Cantabria on 28 May 2023. The following tables show detailed results in the autonomous community's most populous municipalities, sorted alphabetically.

== City control ==
The following table lists party control in the most populous municipalities, including provincial capitals (shown in bold). Gains for a party are displayed with the cell's background shaded in that party's colour.

Municipality	Population	Previous control	New control
**Santander**	171,693	People's Party (PP)	People's Party (PP)
Torrelavega	51,142	Regionalist Party of Cantabria (PRC)	Regionalist Party of Cantabria (PRC)

== Municipalities ==
=== Santander ===
Population: 171,693

← Summary of the 28 May 2023 City Council of Santander election results →
Parties and alliances	Popular vote			Seats	
Parties and alliances	Votes	%	±pp	Total	+/−
People's Party (PP)	37,785	43.37	+8.02	**14**	+3
Spanish Socialist Workers' Party (PSOE)	18,179	20.87	−2.54	**6**	−1
Vox (Vox)	10,638	12.21	+6.88	**3**	+2
Regionalist Party of Cantabria (PRC)	9,650	11.08	−8.04	**3**	−2
United Left–We Can (IU–Podemos)	4,600	5.28	−0.77	**1**	±0
Citizens–Party of the Citizenry (CS)	2,037	2.34	−6.44	0	−2
Cantabrists (Cantabristas)	1,584	1.82	New	0	±0
Greens Equo (Equo)	574	0.66	New	0	±0
Cantabria Wave (OlaCantabria)	269	0.31	−0.15	0	±0
Different Cantabria (Cantabria Distanta)	262	0.30	New	0	±0
Communist Party of the Workers of Spain (PCTE)	151	0.17	New	0	±0
Blank ballots	1,390	1.60	+0.59		
**Total**	**87,119**			**27**	**±0**
Valid votes	87,119	98.77	−0.57		
Invalid votes	1,083	1.23	+0.57		
**Votes cast / turnout**	**88,202**	**65.02**	**+0.30**		
Abstentions	47,447	34.98	−0.30		
**Registered voters**	**135,649**				

=== Torrelavega ===
Population: 51,142

← Summary of the 28 May 2023 City Council of Torrelavega election results →
Parties and alliances	Popular vote			Seats	
Parties and alliances	Votes	%	±pp	Total	+/−
People's Party (PP)	6,921	25.55	+9.69	**7**	+2
Regionalist Party of Cantabria (PRC)	6,303	23.27	−3.56	**7**	−1
Spanish Socialist Workers' Party (PSOE)	6,062	22.38	−3.99	**6**	−2
Vox (Vox)	2,230	8.23	+3.60	**2**	+2
Torrelavega Yes (Torrelavega Sí)	2,180	8.05	+1.87	**2**	+1
United Left–We Can (IU–Podemos)	1,798	6.64	+3.10	**1**	+1
Citizens–Party of the Citizenry (CS)	1,090	4.02	−2.23	0	−1
Citizens' Assembly for Torrelavega (ACPT)	n/a	n/a	−8.56	0	−2
Blank ballots	501	1.85	+0.75		
**Total**	**27,085**			**25**	**±0**
Valid votes	27,085	97.59	−1.21		
Invalid votes	668	2.41	+1.21		
**Votes cast / turnout**	**27,753**	**67.79**	**−0.98**		
Abstentions	13,187	32.21	+0.98		
**Registered voters**	**40,940**				

== See also ==
- 2023 Cantabrian regional election
