= 2019 Spanish local elections in Cantabria =

This article presents the results breakdown of the local elections held in Cantabria on 26 May 2019. The following tables show detailed results in the autonomous community's most populous municipalities, sorted alphabetically.

== City control ==
The following table lists party control in the most populous municipalities, including provincial capitals (shown in bold). Gains for a party are displayed with the cell's background shaded in that party's colour.

Municipality	Population	Previous control	New control
**Santander**	172,044	People's Party (PP)	People's Party (PP)
Torrelavega	51,687	Spanish Socialist Workers' Party (PSOE)	Regionalist Party of Cantabria (PRC)

== Municipalities ==
=== Santander ===
Population: 172,044

← Summary of the 26 May 2019 City Council of Santander election results →
Parties and alliances	Popular vote			Seats	
Parties and alliances	Votes	%	±pp	Total	+/−
People's Party (PP)	31,297	35.35	−5.42	**11**	−2
Spanish Socialist Workers' Party (PSOE)	20,723	23.41	+5.86	**7**	+2
Regionalist Party of Cantabria (PRC)	16,927	19.12	+3.72	**5**	+1
Citizens–Party of the Citizenry (Cs)	7,773	8.78	+0.44	**2**	±0
United for Santander (UxS (IU–Podemos–SSP–Equo))^{1}	5,357	6.05	−6.27	**1**	−2
Vox (Vox)	4,715	5.33	+4.64	**1**	+1
Cantabria Wave (OlaCantabria)	407	0.46	New	0	±0
Let's Win Santander (Ganemos)	283	0.32	New	0	±0
Humanist Party (PH)	99	0.11	−0.04	0	±0
Libertarian Party (P–LIB)	64	0.07	New	0	±0
Blank ballots	890	1.01	−0.55		
**Total**	**88,535**			**27**	**±0**
Valid votes	88,535	99.34	+0.58		
Invalid votes	591	0.66	−0.58		
**Votes cast / turnout**	**89,126**	**64.72**	**+0.42**		
Abstentions	48,594	35.28	−0.42		
**Registered voters**	**137,720**				
Sources
Footnotes: ^{1} United for Santander results are compared to the combined totals of Let's Win Santander Can and United Left in the 2015 election.

=== Torrelavega ===
Population: 51,687

← Summary of the 26 May 2019 City Council of Torrelavega election results →
Parties and alliances	Popular vote			Seats	
Parties and alliances	Votes	%	±pp	Total	+/−
Regionalist Party of Cantabria (PRC)	7,571	26.83	+9.14	**8**	+3
Spanish Socialist Workers' Party (PSOE)	7,443	26.37	+6.35	**8**	+2
People's Party (PP)	4,475	15.86	−8.62	**5**	−2
Citizens' Assembly for Torrelavega (ACPT)	2,415	8.56	+0.44	**2**	±0
Citizens–Party of the Citizenry (Cs)	1,764	6.25	+1.65	**1**	+1
Torrelavega Yes (Torrelavega Sí)	1,745	6.18	−6.39	**1**	−3
Vox (Vox)	1,307	4.63	New	0	±0
United We Can–United Left (Podemos–IU)^{1}	998	3.54	−5.73	0	−1
Union for the Progress of Cantabria (UPCA)	103	0.36	New	0	±0
Cantabria Wave (OlaCantabria)	92	0.33	New	0	±0
Blank ballots	310	1.10	−0.40		
**Total**	**28,223**			**25**	**±0**
Valid votes	28,223	98.80	+0.83		
Invalid votes	342	1.20	−0.83		
**Votes cast / turnout**	**28,565**	**68.77**	**−0.94**		
Abstentions	12,973	31.23	+0.94		
**Registered voters**	**41,538**				
Sources
Footnotes: ^{1} United We Can–United Left results are compared to the combined totals of Torrelavega Can and United Left in the 2015 election.

== See also ==
- 2019 Cantabrian regional election
