= 1987 Spanish local elections in Cantabria =

This article presents the results breakdown of the local elections held in Cantabria on 10 June 1987. The following tables show detailed results in the autonomous community's most populous municipalities, sorted alphabetically.

== City control ==
The following table lists party control in the most populous municipalities, including provincial capitals (highlighted in bold). Gains for a party are highlighted in that party's colour.

Municipality	Population	Previous control	New control
**Santander**	186,145	People's Alliance (AP)	People's Alliance (AP)
Torrelavega	58,539	Spanish Socialist Workers' Party (PSOE)	Spanish Socialist Workers' Party (PSOE)

== Municipalities ==
=== Santander ===
Population: 186,145

← Summary of the 10 June 1987 City Council of Santander election results →
Parties and alliances	Popular vote			Seats	
Parties and alliances	Votes	%	±pp	Total	+/−
People's Alliance (AP)^{1}	41,978	43.56	−13.79	**13**	−4
Spanish Socialist Workers' Party (PSOE)	30,889	32.05	−0.84	**10**	±0
Democratic and Social Centre (CDS)	7,887	8.18	+7.01	**2**	+2
Regionalist Party of Cantabria (PRC)	7,621	7.91	+5.62	**2**	+2
United Left (IU)^{2}	3,713	3.85	+0.06	0	±0
People's Democratic Party (PDP)	1,136	1.18	New	0	±0
Workers' Party of Spain–Communist Unity (PTE–UC)	1,134	1.18	New	0	±0
Humanist Platform (PH)	369	0.38	New	0	±0
Blank ballots	1,649	1.71	+1.71		
**Total**	**96,376**			**27**	**±0**
Valid votes	96,376	98.67	−1.33		
Invalid votes	1,299	1.33	+1.33		
**Votes cast / turnout**	**97,675**	**70.72**	**+1.94**		
Abstentions	40,447	29.28	−1.94		
**Registered voters**	**138,122**				
Sources
Footnotes: ^{1} People's Alliance results are compared to People's Coalition totals in the 1983 election.; ^{2} United Left results are compared to Communist Party of Spain totals in the 1983 election.

=== Torrelavega ===
Population: 58,539

← Summary of the 10 June 1987 City Council of Torrelavega election results →
Parties and alliances	Popular vote			Seats	
Parties and alliances	Votes	%	±pp	Total	+/−
Spanish Socialist Workers' Party (PSOE)	12,241	37.33	−8.97	**11**	−4
People's Alliance (AP)^{1}	6,674	20.36	−3.87	**5**	−2
Regionalist Party of Cantabria (PRC)	3,705	11.30	+9.05	**3**	+3
Democratic and Social Centre (CDS)	3,592	10.96	+7.46	**3**	+3
United Left (IU)^{2}	2,629	8.02	−1.50	**2**	−1
Torrelavega Assembly Bloc (BAT)	2,058	6.28	New	**1**	+1
People's Democratic Party (PDP)	621	1.89	New	0	±0
Workers' Party of Spain–Communist Unity (PTE–UC)	566	1.73	New	0	±0
Humanist Platform (PH)	184	0.56	New	0	±0
Blank ballots	517	1.58	+1.58		
**Total**	**32,787**			**25**	**±0**
Valid votes	32,787	98.43	−1.57		
Invalid votes	523	1.57	+1.57		
**Votes cast / turnout**	**33,310**	**77.19**	**+4.04**		
Abstentions	9,841	22.81	−4.04		
**Registered voters**	**43,151**				
Sources
Footnotes: ^{1} People's Alliance results are compared to People's Coalition totals in the 1983 election.; ^{2} United Left results are compared to Communist Party of Spain totals in the 1983 election.

== See also ==
- 1987 Cantabrian regional election
