= 2007 Spanish regional elections =

- 27 May 2007

812 seats in the regional parliaments of Aragon, Asturias, Balearic Islands, Canary Islands, Cantabria, Castile and León, Castilla–La Mancha, Extremadura, La Rioja, Madrid, Murcia, Navarre and Valencian Community
Regional administrations by leading party in 2007
National parties
PSOE (7)
PP (5+2)
Regional parties
PSC (Note: PSOE's sister party in Catalonia.) (1)
EAJ/PNV (1)
CC (1)
UPN (Note: PP's sister party in Navarre.) (1)
PRC (1)

Regional elections were held in Spain during 2007 to elect the regional parliaments of thirteen of the seventeen autonomous communities: Aragon, Asturias, the Balearic Islands, the Canary Islands, Cantabria, Castile and León, Castilla–La Mancha, Extremadura, La Rioja, Madrid, Murcia, Navarre and the Valencian Community. 812 of 1,206 seats in the regional parliaments were up for election. The elections were held on 27 May (concurrently with local elections all across the country).

The results saw few changes overall, with most incumbent governments remaining in power. The only exception was the People's Party (PP) government in the Balearic Islands, which was replaced by a coalition led by the Spanish Socialist Workers' Party (PSOE).

== Election date ==
Determination of election day varied depending on the autonomous community. Typically, most autonomous communities held their elections on the fourth Sunday of May every four years, concurrently with nationwide local elections, while others had their own, separate electoral cycles. In some cases, regional presidents had the prerogative to dissolve parliament and call for extra elections at a different time, but newly elected assemblies were restricted to serving out what remained of their previous four year-terms without altering the period to their next ordinary election. In other cases—Andalusia (since 1994), Aragon (2007), the Balearic Islands (2007), the Basque Country (1981), Catalonia (1985), Galicia (1985) and the Valencian Community (2006)—the law granted regional presidents the power to call snap elections resulting in fresh four-year parliamentary terms.

== Regional governments ==
The following table lists party control in autonomous communities. Gains for a party are highlighted in that party's colour.

Election day	Region	Previous control	New control
27 May	Aragon	Spanish Socialist Workers' Party (PSOE)	Spanish Socialist Workers' Party (PSOE)
27 May	Asturias	Spanish Socialist Workers' Party (PSOE)	Spanish Socialist Workers' Party (PSOE)
27 May	Balearic Islands	People's Party (PP)	Spanish Socialist Workers' Party (PSOE)
27 May	Canary Islands	Canarian Coalition (CC)	Canarian Coalition (CC)
27 May	Cantabria	Regionalist Party of Cantabria (PRC)	Regionalist Party of Cantabria (PRC)
27 May	Castile and León	People's Party (PP)	People's Party (PP)
27 May	Castilla–La Mancha	Spanish Socialist Workers' Party (PSOE)	Spanish Socialist Workers' Party (PSOE)
27 May	Extremadura	Spanish Socialist Workers' Party (PSOE)	Spanish Socialist Workers' Party (PSOE)
27 May	La Rioja	People's Party (PP)	People's Party (PP)
27 May	Madrid	People's Party (PP)	People's Party (PP)
27 May	Murcia	People's Party (PP)	People's Party (PP)
27 May	Navarre	Navarrese People's Union (UPN)	Navarrese People's Union (UPN)
27 May	Valencian Community	People's Party (PP)	People's Party (PP)

== Summary by region ==
=== May (13 regions) ===
==== Aragon ====
Parties and alliances	Votes	%	±pp	Seats	+/−
PSOE	276,415	41.14	+3.20	30	+3
PP	208,642	31.06	+0.33	23	+1
PAR	81,135	12.08	+0.90	9	+1
CHA	54,752	8.15	−5.56	4	−5
IU	27,440	4.08	+1.02	1	±0
Others	8,562	1.27		0	±0
Blank ballots	14,890	2.22	+0.13		
Valid votes	671,836	99.31	−0.05		
Invalid votes	4,655	0.69	+0.05		
Votes cast / turnout	676,491	66.51	−3.85		
Registered voters	1,017,085				

==== Asturias ====
Parties and alliances	Votes	%	±pp	Seats	+/−
PSOE	252,201	42.04	+1.56	21	−1
PP	248,907	41.50	+2.32	20	+1
IU–BA–LV	58,114	9.69	−2.42	4	±0
URAS–PAS	13,314	2.22	−2.46	0	±0
Others	12,844	2.14		0	±0
Blank ballots	14,458	2.41	+0.12		
Valid votes	599,838	99.20	−0.09		
Invalid votes	4,844	0.80	+0.09		
Votes cast / turnout	604,682	61.59	−2.25		
Registered voters	981,802				

==== Balearic Islands ====
Parties and alliances	Votes	%	±pp	Seats	+/−
PP	192,577	46.02	+1.32	28	−1
PSIB–PSOE	115,477	27.60	+3.06	16	+1
Bloc	37,572	8.98	−3.14	4	−1
UM	28,178	6.73	−0.72	3	±0
PSOE–ExC	19,094	4.56	+0.61	6	+1
PSM–EN	3,292	0.79	+0.10	1	±0
AIPF	1,795	0.43	+0.05	1	±0
Others	11,846	2.83		0	±0
Blank ballots	8,613	2.06	+0.40		
Valid votes	418,444	99.41	+0.06		
Invalid votes	2,497	0.59	−0.06		
Votes cast / turnout	420,941	60.14	−2.70		
Registered voters	699,947				

==== Canary Islands ====
Parties and alliances	Votes	%	±pp	Seats	+/−
PSOE	322,833	34.51	+9.09	26	+9
CC–PNC	225,878	24.15	−12.12	19	−4
PP	224,883	24.04	−6.57	15	−2
NC	50,749	5.43	New	0	±0
CCN	46,676	4.99	+3.58	0	−3
LV	17,793	1.90	−0.08	0	±0
Others	33,411	3.57		0	±0
Blank ballots	13,237	1.42	+0.14		
Valid votes	935,460	99.43	−0.01		
Invalid votes	5,392	0.57	+0.01		
Votes cast / turnout	940,852	60.44	−4.18		
Registered voters	1,556,587				

==== Cantabria ====
Parties and alliances	Votes	%	±pp	Seats	+/−
PP	143,610	41.48	−1.01	17	−1
PRC	99,159	28.64	+9.40	12	+4
PSOE	84,982	24.54	−5.45	10	−3
IU–BR	6,511	1.88	−1.82	0	±0
Others	6,059	1.75		0	±0
Blank ballots	5,923	1.71	−0.37		
Valid votes	346,244	99.06	−0.12		
Invalid votes	3,276	0.94	+0.12		
Votes cast / turnout	349,520	71.97	−1.08		
Registered voters	485,624				

==== Castile and León ====
Parties and alliances	Votes	%	±pp	Seats	+/−
PP	748,746	49.17	+0.68	48	±0
PSOE	574,596	37.73	+0.96	33	+1
IU–LV–CyL	46,878	3.08	−0.37	0	±0
UPL–UZ	41,519	2.73	−1.28	2	±0
ACAL	17,496	1.15	−0.19	0	±0
CI–PCL	16,435	1.08	+0.37	0	±0
Others	46,921	3.08		0	±0
Blank ballots	30,200	1.98	−0.32		
Valid votes	1,522,791	99.20	+0.06		
Invalid votes	12,305	0.80	−0.06		
Votes cast / turnout	1,535,096	70.70	−1.96		
Registered voters	2,171,192				

==== Castilla–La Mancha ====
Parties and alliances	Votes	%	±pp	Seats	+/−
PSOE	572,849	51.96	−5.87	26	−3
PP	467,319	42.38	+5.72	21	+3
IU–ICAM	37,753	3.42	+0.37	0	±0
Others	10,562	0.96		0	±0
Blank ballots	14,080	1.28	−0.05		
Valid votes	1,102,563	99.25	−0.07		
Invalid votes	8,322	0.75	+0.07		
Votes cast / turnout	1,110,885	73.74	−2.50		
Registered voters	1,506,504				

==== Extremadura ====
Parties and alliances	Votes	%	±pp	Seats	+/−
PSOE–r	352,342	53.00	+1.34	38	+2
PP–EU	257,392	38.71	−1.83	27	+1
IU–SIEx	30,028	4.52	−1.75	0	−3
IPEx	8,389	1.26	New	0	±0
Others	8,777	1.32		0	±0
Blank ballots	7,926	1.19	−0.18		
Valid votes	664,854	99.27	+0.08		
Invalid votes	4,898	0.73	−0.08		
Votes cast / turnout	669,752	74.95	−0.68		
Registered voters	893,547				

==== La Rioja ====
Parties and alliances	Votes	%	±pp	Seats	+/−
PP	84,382	48.81	+0.21	17	±0
PSOE	69,858	40.41	+2.23	14	±0
PR	10,369	6.00	+0.81	2	±0
IZQ	5,292	3.06	−1.30	0	±0
Blank ballots	2,977	1.72	−0.18		
Valid votes	172,878	99.21	+0.04		
Invalid votes	1,379	0.79	−0.04		
Votes cast / turnout	174,257	73.30	−1.80		
Registered voters	237,745				

==== Madrid ====
Parties and alliances	Votes	%	±pp	Seats	+/−
PP	1,592,162	53.29	+4.81	67	+10
PSOE	1,002,862	33.57	−5.43	42	−3
IUCM	264,782	8.86	+0.36	11	+2
LV, LVM, LVCM, LV–GV	33,044	1.11	+0.14	0	±0
Others	43,231	1.45		0	±0
Blank ballots	51,665	1.73	−0.01		
Valid votes	2,987,746	99.55	−0.06		
Invalid votes	13,454	0.45	+0.06		
Votes cast / turnout	3,001,200	67.31	+4.73		
Registered voters	4,458,989				

==== Murcia ====
Parties and alliances	Votes	%	±pp	Seats	+/−
PP	379,011	58.30	+1.64	29	+1
PSOE	207,998	32.00	−2.11	15	−1
IU–LV–RM	40,633	6.25	−0.98	1	±0
CCR	8,139	1.25	New	0	±0
Others	5,648	0.87		0	±0
Blank ballots	8,642	1.33	−0.20		
Valid votes	650,071	99.24	+0.04		
Invalid votes	4,972	0.76	−0.04		
Votes cast / turnout	655,043	68.01	−1.97		
Registered voters	963,221				

==== Navarre ====
Parties and alliances	Votes	%	±pp	Seats	+/−
UPN	139,132	42.19	+0.71	22	−1
NaBai	77,872	23.62	+5.80	12	+4
PSN–PSOE	74,158	22.49	+1.34	12	+1
CDN	14,412	4.37	−3.28	2	−2
IUN/NEB	14,337	4.35	−4.43	2	−2
RCN/NOK	4,705	1.43	New	0	±0
PC	541	0.16	−0.17	0	±0
Blank ballots	4,581	1.39	−0.99		
Valid votes	329,738	94.74	+1.22		
Invalid votes	18,301	5.26	−1.22		
Votes cast / turnout	348,039	73.79	+3.09		
Registered voters	471,653				

==== Valencian Community ====
Parties and alliances	Votes	%	±pp	Seats	+/−
PP	1,277,458	52.52	+5.35	54	+6
PSPV–PSOE	838,987	34.49	−1.47	38	+3
Compromís PV	195,116	8.02	−3.02	7	+1
Others	86,545	3.56		0	±0
Blank ballots	34,348	1.41	−0.14		
Valid votes	2,432,454	99.33	−0.02		
Invalid votes	16,376	0.67	+0.02		
Votes cast / turnout	2,448,830	70.14	−1.37		
Registered voters	3,491,365				

== Bibliography ==
- Ley Orgánica 5/1985, de 19 de junio, del Régimen Electoral General (Organic Law 5/1985). Official State Gazette (in Spanish). 19 June 1985 [version as of 20 April 2007]. BOE-A-1985-11672.
