= Opinion polling for the 2015 Spanish local elections (Cantabria) =

In the run up to the 2015 Spanish local elections, various organisations carried out opinion polling to gauge voting intention in local entities in Spain. Results of such polls for municipalities in Cantabria are displayed in this article. The date range for these opinion polls is from the previous local elections, held on 22 May 2011, to the day the next elections were held, on 24 May 2015.

Polls are listed in reverse chronological order, showing the most recent first and using the dates when the survey fieldwork was done, as opposed to the date of publication. Where the fieldwork dates are unknown, the date of publication is given instead. The highest percentage figure in each polling survey is displayed with its background shaded in the leading party's colour. If a tie ensues, this is applied to the figures with the highest percentages. The "Lead" columns on the right shows the percentage-point difference between the parties with the highest percentages in a given poll.

== Municipalities ==
=== Castro Urdiales ===
Polling firm/Commissioner	Fieldwork date	Sample size	Turnout	PP	PSOE	CV	PRC	AxC	AAV	IU	GT	LU	Podemos	Lead
2015 municipal election	24 May 2015	—N/a	61.8	19.4; 5	15.5; 4	29.7; 7	18.7; 4	4.9; 0	5.8; 1	2.5; 0	–	1.0; 0	–	10.3
MuchoCastro	17 May 2015	386	?	19.6; 4/5	13.0; 3	29.9; 7/8	14.9; 3	6.9; 1	8.0; 2	2.3; 0	–	2.2; 0	–	10.3
MuchoCastro	7 May 2015	533	?	22.2; 5/6	9.8; 2	21.8; 5/6	21.5; 5	3.8; 0	9.0; 2	6.0; 1	–	3.8; 0	–	0.4
MuchoCastro	12 Apr 2015	490	?	15.1; 3/4	15.7; 4	26.9; 6/7	21.4; 5	5.0; 0/1	8.4; 1/2	–	–	3.8; 0	–	5.5
MuchoCastro	31 Jan 2015	474	?	18.6; 5	13.4; 3	27.4; 7	5.6; 1	7.3; 1	4.0; 0	1.3; 0	3.6; 0	–	15.6; 4	8.8
MuchoCastro	10 Oct 2014	393	?	18.9; 4/5	13.7; 3	20.3; 5	16.6; 4	8.4; 2	–	–	4.8; 0/1	–	11.3; 2/3	1.4
MuchoCastro	7 Sep 2014	523	?	20.7; 5	20.7; 5	20.4; 4/5	12.7; 3	7.6; 1/2	–	–	–	–	10.6; 2	Tie
2011 municipal election	22 May 2011	—N/a	60.7	24.2; 7	20.1; 5	15.8; 4	11.0; 3	6.7; 1	5.8; 1	3.8; 0	2.4; 0	1.9; 0	–	4.1

=== Santander ===
Polling firm/Commissioner	Fieldwork date	Sample size	Turnout	PP	PSOE	PRC	IU	UPyD	C's	GSSP	Lead
2015 municipal election	24 May 2015	—N/a	64.3	40.8; 13	17.6; 5	15.4; 4	5.5; 1	1.2; 0	8.3; 2	6.8; 2	23.2
Ikerfel/El Diario Montañés	5–9 May 2015	700	?	46.1; 14	15.8; 5	11.8; 3	4.6; 0	1.5; 0	11.2; 3	6.9; 2	30.3
Ikerfel/El Diario Montañés	23 Feb–3 Mar 2015	600	?	47.5; 14/15	12.1; 3	9.6; 2/3	6.6; 2	–	11.3; 3	8.8; 2	35.4
PP	14 Nov 2014	?	?	? 14	? 5	? 3	–	–	–	? 5	?
PP	14 Nov 2014	?	?	? 16	? 5/6	? 4/5	–	–	–	–	?
2011 municipal election	22 May 2011	—N/a	66.9	56.2; 18	17.0; 5	14.6; 4	4.5; 0	2.8; 0	–	–	39.2

=== Torrelavega ===
Polling firm/Commissioner	Fieldwork date	Sample size	Turnout	PP	PSOE	PRC	ACPT	IU	TP	C's	TSí	Lead
2015 municipal election	24 May 2015	—N/a	69.7	24.5; 7	20.0; 6	17.7; 5	8.1; 2	3.9; 0	5.4; 1	4.6; 0	12.6; 4	4.5
Ikerfel/El Diario Montañés	5–9 May 2015	500	?	23.3; 6/7	20.3; 6	19.5; 5/6	4.4; 0	1.7; 0	5.3; 1	10.2; 3	12.9; 3/4	3.0
Ikerfel/El Diario Montañés	23 Feb–3 Mar 2015	500	65.1	24.8; 7	23.2; 7	17.2; 5	6.0; 1	–	9.9; 2/3	6.5; 1/2	6.4; 1/2	1.6
2011 municipal election	22 May 2011	—N/a	72.6	34.9; 10	27.7; 8	22.9; 6	6.7; 1	2.2; 0	–	–	–	7.2
