= 1995 Cantabrian regional election =

Election in the Spanish region of Cantabria

- 28 May 1995

All 39 seats in the Regional Assembly of Cantabria 20 seats needed for a majority
- Opinion polls
- Registered: 435,752 ▲5.7%
- Turnout: 322,654 (74.0%) ▲1.7 pp
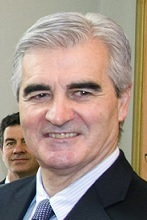

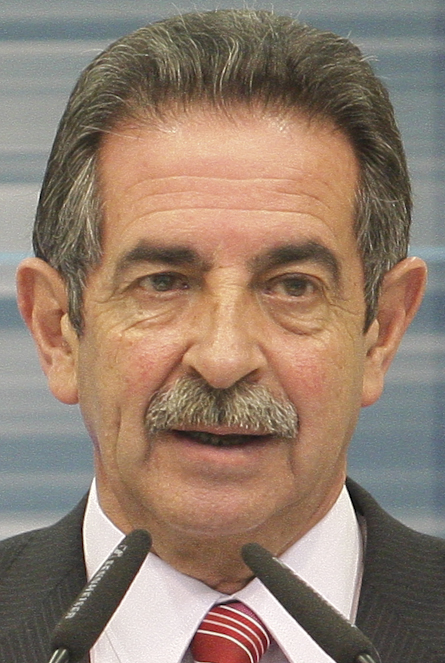

	First party	Second party	Third party
Leader	José Joaquín Martínez Sieso	Julio Neira	Vicente de la Hera
Party	PP	PSOE	UPCA
Leader since	1995	23 February 1995	13 December 1994
Last election	6 seats, 14.4%	16 seats, 34.8%	15 seats, 33.5%
Seats won	13	10	7
Seat change	▲7	▼6	▼8
Popular vote	104,008	80,464	53,191
Percentage	32.5%	25.1%	16.6%
Swing	▲18.1 pp	▼9.7 pp	▼16.9 pp
	Fourth party	Fifth party
Leader	Miguel Ángel Revilla	Ángel Agudo
Party	PRC	IU
Leader since	1983	1983
Last election	2 seats, 6.4%	0 seats, 4.4%
Seats won	6	3
Seat change	▲4	▲3
Popular vote	46,587	23,563
Percentage	14.6%	7.4%
Swing	▲8.2 pp	▲3.0 pp
President before election
None
(Juan Hormaechea as acting)
Elected President
José Joaquín Martínez Sieso
PP

The 1995 Cantabrian regional election was held on 28 May 1995 to elect the 4th Regional Assembly of the autonomous community of Cantabria. All 39 seats in the Regional Assembly were up for election. It was held concurrently with regional elections in 12 other autonomous communities and local elections all throughout Spain.

The People's Party won the election, recovering much of the vote it had lost in 1991 to Hormaechea's Union for the Progress of Cantabria (UPCA), which fell to third place and lost over half of its seats and votes. The Spanish Socialist Workers' Party (PSOE), which in 1991 had won the regional election, collapsed and obtained its worst result until that time. The Regionalist Party of Cantabria (PRC) recovered and scored fourth with nearly 15% of the vote, while United Left (IU) entered the Assembly for the first time.

As a result of the election, José Joaquín Martínez Sieso from the People's Party was able to be elected as regional President thanks to a PP-PRC coalition agreement.

== Overview ==
=== Electoral system ===
The Regional Assembly of Cantabria was the devolved, unicameral legislature of the autonomous community of Cantabria, having legislative power in regional matters as defined by the Spanish Constitution and the Cantabrian Statute of Autonomy, as well as the ability to vote confidence in or withdraw it from a President of the Regional Deputation. Voting for the Parliament was on the basis of universal suffrage, which comprised all nationals over 18 years of age, registered in Cantabria and in full enjoyment of their political rights.

The 39 members of the Regional Assembly of Cantabria were elected using the D'Hondt method and a closed list proportional representation, with an electoral threshold of five percent of valid votes—which included blank ballots—being applied regionally.

The electoral law provided that parties, federations, coalitions and groupings of electors were allowed to present lists of candidates. However, groupings of electors were required to secure the signature of at least 1 percent of the electors registered in Cantabria. Electors were barred from signing for more than one list of candidates. Concurrently, parties and federations intending to enter in coalition to take part jointly at an election were required to inform the relevant Electoral Commission within ten days of the election being called.

=== Election date ===
The term of the Regional Assembly of Cantabria expired four years after the date of its previous election. Elections to the Regional Assembly were fixed for the fourth Sunday of May every four years. The previous election was held on 26 May 1991, setting the election date for the Parliament on 28 May 1995.

The Regional Assembly of Cantabria could not be dissolved before the expiration date of parliament except in the event of an investiture process failing to elect a regional President within a two-month period from the first ballot. In such a case, the Regional Assembly was to be automatically dissolved and a snap election called, with elected lawmakers serving the remainder of its original four-year term.

== Opinion polls ==
The table below lists voting intention estimates in reverse chronological order, showing the most recent first and using the dates when the survey fieldwork was done, as opposed to the date of publication. Where the fieldwork dates are unknown, the date of publication is given instead. The highest percentage figure in each polling survey is displayed with its background shaded in the leading party's colour. If a tie ensues, this is applied to the figures with the highest percentages. The "Lead" column on the right shows the percentage-point difference between the parties with the highest percentages in a poll. When available, seat projections determined by the polling organisations are displayed below (or in place of) the percentages in a smaller font; 20 seats were required for an absolute majority in the Regional Assembly of Cantabria.

Color key:

Exit poll

Polling firm/Commissioner	Fieldwork date	Sample size	Turnout	PSOE	UPCA	PP	PRC	IU	Lead
1995 regional election	28 May 1995	—N/a	74.0	25.1; 10	16.6; 7	32.5; 13	14.6; 6	7.4; 3	7.4
Eco Consulting/RTVE	28 May 1995	?	?	22.8; 9/10	14.6; 5/7	35.3; 15/16	12.6; 5/6	8.6; 3/4	12.5
Vox Pública–ODEC/Antena 3	28 May 1995	?	?	? 9/10	? 6/7	? 14/15	? 6/7	? 2/3	?
Demoscopia/El País	10–15 May 1995	500	?	22.0; 9	19.4; 8	32.7; 13	12.5; 5	11.3; 4	10.7
CIS	24 Apr–10 May 1995	500	67.6	31.3	22.0	29.7	10.8	5.5	1.6
1994 EP election	12 Jun 1994	—N/a	61.9	32.2 (13)	–	49.5 (21)	–	12.3 (5)	17.3
1993 general election	6 Jun 1993	—N/a	79.0	37.2 (16)	8.2 (3)	37.0 (15)	5.7 (2)	7.4 (3)	0.2
1991 regional election	26 May 1991	—N/a	72.3	34.8; 16	33.5; 15	14.4; 6	6.4; 2	4.4; 0	1.3

== Results ==
← Summary of the 28 May 1995 Regional Assembly of Cantabria election results →
Parties and alliances	Popular vote			Seats	
Parties and alliances	Votes	%	±pp	Total	+/−
People's Party (PP)	104,008	32.50	+18.06	13	+7
Spanish Socialist Workers' Party (PSOE)	80,464	25.14	−9.67	10	−6
Union for the Progress of Cantabria (UPCA)	53,191	16.62	−16.91	7	−8
Regionalist Party of Cantabria (PRC)	46,587	14.56	+8.21	6	+4
United Left (IU)	23,563	7.36	+2.96	3	+3
Independents of Cantabria (INCA)	3,182	0.99	New	0	±0
Democratic and Social Centre (CDS)	1,267	0.40	−2.28	0	±0
Cantabria Renewal Coalition (CR–CA)	879	0.27	New	0	±0
Communist Party of the Peoples of Spain (PCPE)	705	0.22	−0.08	0	±0
Neighborhood Group of Cantabria (AAVV–C)	0	0.00	−0.49	0	±0
Blank ballots	6,186	1.93	+0.24		
Total	320,032			39	±0
Valid votes	320,032	99.19	+0.04		
Invalid votes	2,622	0.81	−0.04		
Votes cast / turnout	322,654	74.05	+1.71		
Abstentions	113,098	25.95	−1.71		
Registered voters	435,752				

Popular vote
PP	32.50%
PSOE	25.14%
UPCA	16.62%
PRC	14.56%
IU	7.36%
Others	1.89%
Blank ballots	1.93%

Seats
PP	33.33%
PSOE	25.64%
UPCA	17.95%
PRC	15.38%
IU	7.69%

== Aftermath ==
Investiture; José Joaquín Martínez Sieso (PP)
Ballot →	11 July 1995	13 July 1995
Required majority →	20 out of 39	Simple
Yes: • PP (13); • UPCA (7) (on 13 Jul); • PRC (6)	19 / 39	26 / 39
No: • PSOE (10); • UPCA (7) (on 11 Jul); • IU (3) (on 11 Jul)	20 / 39	10 / 39
Abstentions: • IU (3) (on 13 Jul)	0 / 39	3 / 39
Absentees	0 / 39	0 / 39
