= 1999 Cantabrian regional election =

Election in the Spanish region of Cantabria

- 13 June 1999

All 39 seats in the Parliament of Cantabria 20 seats needed for a majority
- Opinion polls
- Registered: 465,168 ▲6.8%
- Turnout: 319,947 (68.8%) ▼5.2 pp
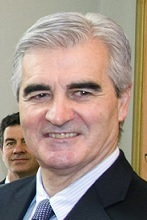

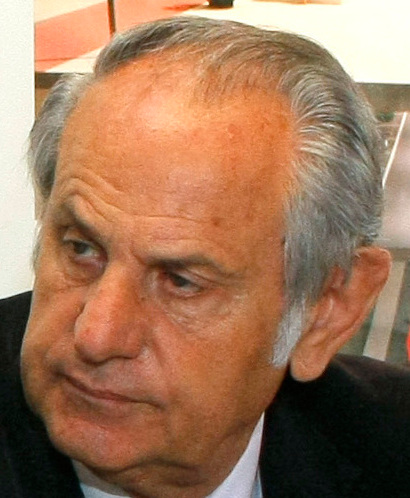

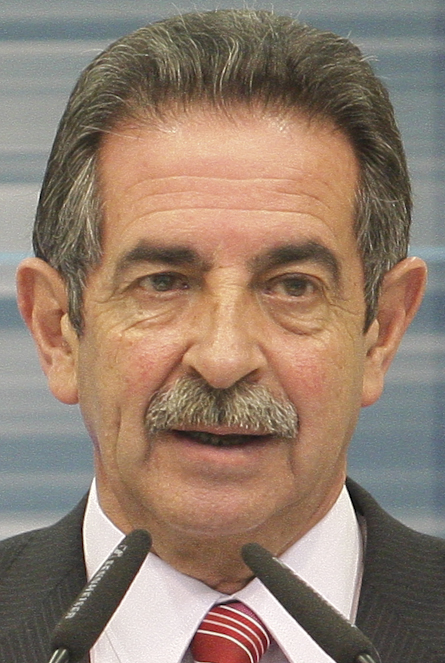
	First party	Second party	Third party
Leader	José Joaquín Martínez Sieso	Ángel Duque	Miguel Ángel Revilla
Party	PP	PSOE–p	PRC
Leader since	1995	28 June 1998	1983
Last election	13 seats, 32.5%	10 seats, 25.1%	6 seats, 14.6%
Seats won	19	14	6
Seat change	▲6	▲4	0
Popular vote	134,924	105,004	42,896
Percentage	42.5%	33.1%	13.5%
Swing	▲10.0 pp	▲8.0 pp	▼1.1 pp
President before election
José Joaquín Martínez Sieso
PP
Elected President
José Joaquín Martínez Sieso
PP

The 1999 Cantabrian regional election was held on 13 June 1999 to elect the 5th Parliament of the autonomous community of Cantabria. All 39 seats in the Parliament were up for election. It was held concurrently with regional elections in 12 other autonomous communities and local elections all throughout Spain, as well as the 1999 European Parliament election.

== Overview ==
=== Electoral system ===
The Parliament of Cantabria was the devolved, unicameral legislature of the autonomous community of Cantabria, having legislative power in regional matters as defined by the Spanish Constitution and the Cantabrian Statute of Autonomy, as well as the ability to vote confidence in or withdraw it from a President of the Autonomous Community. Voting for the Parliament was on the basis of universal suffrage, which comprised all nationals over 18 years of age, registered in Cantabria and in full enjoyment of all political rights, entitled to vote.

The 39 members of the Parliament of Cantabria were elected using the D'Hondt method and a closed list proportional representation, with an electoral threshold of five percent of valid votes—which included blank ballots—being applied regionally.

The electoral law provided that parties, federations, coalitions and groupings of electors were allowed to present lists of candidates. However, groupings of electors were required to secure the signature of at least 1 percent of the electors registered in Cantabria. Electors were barred from signing for more than one list of candidates. Concurrently, parties and federations intending to enter in coalition to take part jointly at an election were required to inform the relevant Electoral Commission within ten days of the election being called.

=== Election date ===
The term of the Parliament of Cantabria expired four years after the date of its previous election. Elections to the Parliament were fixed for the fourth Sunday of May every four years. Legal amendments introduced in 1998 allowed for these to be held together with European Parliament elections, provided that they were scheduled for within a four month-timespan. The previous election was held on 28 May 1995, setting the election date for the Parliament concurrently with a European Parliament election on 13 June 1999.

After legal amendments in 1998, the President of the Autonomous Community was granted the prerogative to dissolve the Parliament of Cantabria and call a snap election, provided that no motion of no confidence was in process, no nationwide election was due and some time requirements were met: namely, that dissolution did not occur either during the first legislative session or within the legislature's last year ahead of its scheduled expiry, nor before one year has elapsed since a previous dissolution. In the event of an investiture process failing to elect a regional President within a two-month period from the first ballot, the Parliament was to be automatically dissolved and a fresh election called. Any snap election held as a result of these circumstances would not alter the period to the next ordinary election, with elected lawmakers serving the remainder of its original four-year term.

== Opinion polls ==
The table below lists voting intention estimates in reverse chronological order, showing the most recent first and using the dates when the survey fieldwork was done, as opposed to the date of publication. Where the fieldwork dates are unknown, the date of publication is given instead. The highest percentage figure in each polling survey is displayed with its background shaded in the leading party's colour. If a tie ensues, this is applied to the figures with the highest percentages. The "Lead" column on the right shows the percentage-point difference between the parties with the highest percentages in a poll. When available, seat projections determined by the polling organisations are displayed below (or in place of) the percentages in a smaller font; 20 seats were required for an absolute majority in the Parliament of Cantabria.

Polling firm/Commissioner	Fieldwork date	Sample size	Turnout	PP	PSOE	UPCA	PRC	IU	Lead
1999 regional election	13 Jun 1999	—N/a	68.8	42.5; 19	33.1; 14	3.1; 0	13.5; 6	3.7; 0	9.4
Eco Consulting/ABC	24 May–2 Jun 1999	?	?	38.9; 16/17	29.8; 12/13	7.8; 3	13.2; 5/6	6.7; 2/3	9.1
Demoscopia/El País	26 May–1 Jun 1999	?	71	42.3; 18/19	29.2; 11/12	4.0; 0	16.7; 7	6.8; 2	13.1
Sigma Dos/El Mundo	18–25 May 1999	600	?	43.8; 18/20	32.1; 13/14	–	11.3; 4/5	6.2; 2	11.7
CIS	3–19 May 1999	615	73.0	39.5; 16/17	26.3; 10/11	6.5; 2	18.8; 7/8	6.6; 2	13.2
PSOE	30 Mar 1999	?	?	? 18	? 12/13	–	–	–	?
1996 general election	3 Mar 1996	—N/a	79.3	50.5 (21)	35.6 (14)	–	–	11.4 (4)	14.9
1995 regional election	28 May 1995	—N/a	74.0	32.5; 13	25.1; 10	16.6; 7	14.6; 6	7.4; 3	7.4

== Results ==
← Summary of the 13 June 1999 Parliament of Cantabria election results →
Parties and alliances	Popular vote			Seats	
Parties and alliances	Votes	%	±pp	Total	+/−
People's Party (PP)	134,924	42.50	+10.00	19	+6
Spanish Socialist Workers' Party–Progressives (PSOE–p)	105,004	33.08	+7.94	14	+4
Regionalist Party of Cantabria (PRC)	42,896	13.51	−1.05	6	±0
United Left of Cantabria (IUC)	11,707	3.69	−3.67	0	−3
Union for the Progress of Cantabria (UPCA)	9,743	3.07	−13.55	0	−7
Centrist Union–Democratic and Social Centre (UC–CDS)	1,479	0.47	+0.07	0	±0
Cantabrian Nationalist Council (CNC)	1,179	0.37	New	0	±0
Independent Citizens of Cantabria (CCII)	924	0.29	New	0	±0
Unemployed Collective of Cantabria (COPARCA)	761	0.24	New	0	±0
Spanish Democratic Party (PADE)	650	0.20	New	0	±0
Spanish Phalanx of the CNSO (FE–JONS)	449	0.14	New	0	±0
Blank ballots	7,717	2.43	+0.50		
Total	317,433			39	±0
Valid votes	317,433	99.21	+0.02		
Invalid votes	2,514	0.79	−0.02		
Votes cast / turnout	319,947	68.78	−5.27		
Abstentions	145,221	31.22	+5.27		
Registered voters	465,168				

Popular vote
PP	42.50%
PSOE–p	33.08%
PRC	13.51%
IUC	3.69%
UPCA	3.07%
Others	1.71%
Blank ballots	2.43%

Seats
PP	48.72%
PSOE–p	35.90%
PRC	15.38%

== Aftermath ==
Investiture; José Joaquín Martínez Sieso (PP)
Ballot →	22 July 1999
Required majority →	20 out of 39
Yes: • PP (19); • PRC (6)	25 / 39
No: • PSOE (14)	14 / 39
Abstentions	0 / 39
Absentees	0 / 39
