= 2007 Cantabrian regional election =

Election in the Spanish region of Cantabria

- 27 May 2007

All 39 seats in the Parliament of Cantabria 20 seats needed for a majority
- Opinion polls
- Registered: 485,624 ▲1.8%
- Turnout: 349,520 (72.0%) ▼1.0 pp
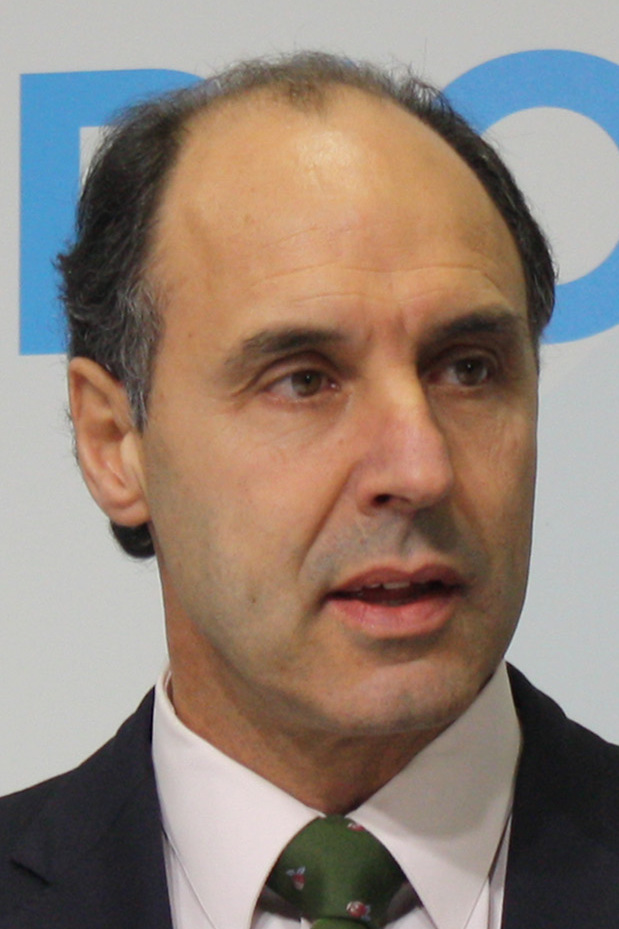

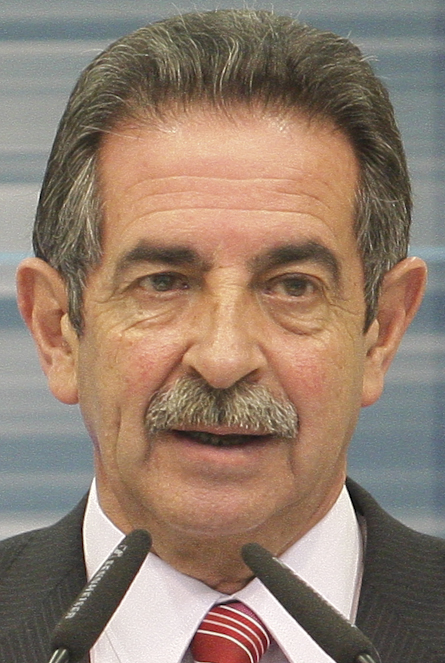

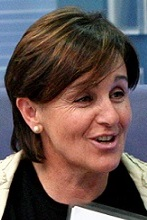
| | First party | Second party | Third party |
|---|---|---|---|
| Leader | Ignacio Diego | Miguel Ángel Revilla | Dolores Gorostiaga |
| Party | PP | PRC | PSOE |
| Leader since | 13 November 2004 | 1984 | 16 December 2000 |
| Last election | 18 seats, 42.5% | 8 seats, 19.2% | 13 seats, 30.0% |
| Seats won | 17 | 12 | 10 |
| Seat change | ▼1 | ▲4 | ▼3 |
| Popular vote | 143,610 | 99,159 | 84,982 |
| Percentage | 41.5% | 28.6% | 24.5% |
| Swing | ▼1.0 pp | ▲9.4 pp | ▼5.5 pp |
President before election
Miguel Ángel Revilla
PRC
Elected President
Miguel Ángel Revilla
PRC

The 2007 Cantabrian regional election was held on 27 May 2007 to elect the 7th Parliament of the autonomous community of Cantabria. All 39 seats in the Parliament were up for election. It was held concurrently with regional elections in 12 other autonomous communities and local elections all throughout Spain.

== Overview ==
=== Electoral system ===
The Parliament of Cantabria was the devolved, unicameral legislature of the autonomous community of Cantabria, having legislative power in regional matters as defined by the Spanish Constitution and the Cantabrian Statute of Autonomy, as well as the ability to vote confidence in or withdraw it from a President of the Autonomous Community. Voting for the Parliament was on the basis of universal suffrage, which comprised all nationals over 18 years of age, registered in Cantabria and in full enjoyment of their political rights.

The 39 members of the Parliament of Cantabria were elected using the D'Hondt method and a closed list proportional representation, with an electoral threshold of five percent of valid votes—which included blank ballots—being applied regionally.

The electoral law provided that parties, federations, coalitions and groupings of electors were allowed to present lists of candidates. However, groupings of electors were required to secure the signature of at least 1 percent of the electors registered in Cantabria. Electors were barred from signing for more than one list of candidates. Concurrently, parties and federations intending to enter in coalition to take part jointly at an election were required to inform the relevant Electoral Commission within ten days of the election being called.

=== Election date ===
The term of the Parliament of Cantabria expired four years after the date of its previous election. Elections to the Parliament were fixed for the fourth Sunday of May every four years. The previous election was held on 25 May 2003, setting the election date for the Parliament on 27 May 2007.

The President of the Autonomous Community had the prerogative to dissolve the Parliament of Cantabria and call a snap election, provided that no motion of no confidence was in process, no nationwide election was due and some time requirements were met: namely, that dissolution did not occur either during the first legislative session or within the legislature's last year ahead of its scheduled expiry, nor before one year has elapsed since a previous dissolution. In the event of an investiture process failing to elect a regional President within a two-month period from the first ballot, the Parliament was to be automatically dissolved and a fresh election called. Any snap election held as a result of these circumstances would not alter the period to the next ordinary election, with elected lawmakers serving the remainder of its original four-year term.

== Opinion polls ==
The table below lists voting intention estimates in reverse chronological order, showing the most recent first and using the dates when the survey fieldwork was done, as opposed to the date of publication. Where the fieldwork dates are unknown, the date of publication is given instead. The highest percentage figure in each polling survey is displayed with its background shaded in the leading party's colour. If a tie ensues, this is applied to the figures with the highest percentages. The "Lead" column on the right shows the percentage-point difference between the parties with the highest percentages in a poll. When available, seat projections determined by the polling organisations are displayed below (or in place of) the percentages in a smaller font; 20 seats were required for an absolute majority in the Parliament of Cantabria.

Color key:

Exit poll

| Polling firm/Commissioner | Fieldwork date | Sample size | Turnout | PP | PSOE | PRC | IU | Lead |
|---|---|---|---|---|---|---|---|---|
| 2007 regional election | 27 May 2007 | —N/a | 72.0 | 41.5; 17 | 24.5; 10 | 28.6; 12 | 1.9; 0 | 12.9 |
| Ipsos/RTVE–FORTA | 27 May 2007 | ? | ? | ? 13/14 | ? 12/14 | ? 10/12 | ? 0 | ? |
| Thalassa/El Diario Montañés | 20 May 2007 | 2,012 | ? | 38.9; 16/17 | 30.3; 12/13 | 23.4; 10/11 | 2.5; 0 | 8.6 |
| Celeste-Tel/Terra | 9–15 May 2007 | ? | ? | 40.6; 17/18 | 28.8; 12/13 | 22.3; 9 | 3.6; 0 | 11.8 |
| Sigma Dos/El Mundo | 27 Apr–8 May 2007 | 400 | ? | 41.3; 17/18 | 31.4; 12/13 | 21.9; 9 | – | 9.9 |
| CIS | 9 Apr–6 May 2007 | 1,000 | ? | 39.5; 16/17 | 29.0; 12 | 25.4; 10/11 | 3.3; 0 | 10.5 |
| Thalassa/El Diario Montañés (Note: Undecided and/or abstentionists excluded.) | 29 Apr 2007 | 660 | ? | 38.4; 15/17 | 30.9; 13/14 | 22.9; 9/10 | 2.9; 0 | 7.5 |
| P&I/Alerta | 8–16 Feb 2007 | 405 | 66.7 | 36.2; 15 | 31.4; 13 | 26.1; 11 | 1.3; 0 | 4.8 |
| Sigma Dos/El Mundo | 16–24 Nov 2006 | ? | ? | ? 18/20 | ? 12/13 | ? 7/8 | – | ? |
| 2004 EP election | 13 Jun 2004 | —N/a | 51.8 | 52.5 (22) | 42.3 (17) | – | 2.5 (0) | 10.2 |
| 2004 general election | 14 Mar 2004 | —N/a | 77.2 | 51.9 (22) | 40.9 (17) | – | 3.3 (0) | 11.0 |
| 2003 regional election | 25 May 2003 | —N/a | 73.0 | 42.5; 18 | 30.0; 13 | 19.2; 8 | 3.7; 0 | 12.5 |

== Results ==
← Summary of the 27 May 2007 Parliament of Cantabria election results →
| Parties and alliances | Popular vote | | | Seats | |
| Parties and alliances | Votes | % | ±pp | Total | +/− |
|---|---|---|---|---|---|
| People's Party (PP) | 143,610 | 41.48 | −1.01 | 17 | −1 |
| Regionalist Party of Cantabria (PRC) | 99,159 | 28.64 | +9.40 | 12 | +4 |
| Spanish Socialist Workers' Party (PSOE) | 84,982 | 24.54 | −5.45 | 10 | −3 |
| Assembly for Cantabria (IU–BR)^{1} | 6,511 | 1.88 | −1.82 | 0 | ±0 |
| Council (Conceju) | 1,262 | 0.36 | −0.12 | 0 | ±0 |
| The Union (LU) | 1,206 | 0.35 | New | 0 | ±0 |
| Anti-Bullfighting Party Against Mistreatment of Animals (PACMA) | 965 | 0.28 | New | 0 | ±0 |
| Communist Party of the Peoples of Spain (PCPE) | 728 | 0.21 | New | 0 | ±0 |
| Liberal Democratic Centre (CDL) | 656 | 0.19 | New | 0 | ±0 |
| Spanish Phalanx of the CNSO (FE–JONS) | 483 | 0.14 | New | 0 | ±0 |
| Engine and Sports Alternative (AMD) | 416 | 0.12 | New | 0 | ±0 |
| Humanist Party (PH) | 343 | 0.10 | New | 0 | ±0 |
| Blank ballots | 5,923 | 1.71 | −0.37 | | |
| Total | 346,244 | | | 39 | ±0 |
| Valid votes | 346,244 | 99.06 | −0.12 | | |
| Invalid votes | 3,276 | 0.94 | +0.12 | | |
| Votes cast / turnout | 349,520 | 71.97 | −1.08 | | |
| Abstentions | 136,104 | 28.03 | +1.08 | | |
| Registered voters | 485,624 | | | | |
Sources
Footnotes: ^{1} Assembly for Cantabria results are compared to United Left of Cantabria totals in the 2003 election.

Popular vote
| PP | 41.48% |
| PRC | 28.64% |
| PSOE | 24.54% |
| IU–BR | 1.88% |
| Others | 1.75% |
| Blank ballots | 1.71% |

Seats
| PP | 43.59% |
| PRC | 30.77% |
| PSOE | 25.64% |

== Aftermath ==
Investiture; Miguel Ángel Revilla (PRC)
| Ballot → | 30 June 2007 |
| Required majority → | 20 out of 39 |
| Yes: • PRC (12); • PSOE (10) | 22 / 39 |
| No: • PP (17) | 17 / 39 |
| Abstentions | 0 / 39 |
| Absentees | 0 / 39 |
