= 2003 Cantabrian regional election =

Election in the Spanish region of Cantabria

- 25 May 2003

All 39 seats in the Parliament of Cantabria 20 seats needed for a majority
- Opinion polls
- Registered: 476,924 ▲2.5%
- Turnout: 348,377 (73.0%) ▲4.2 pp
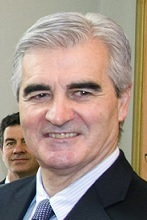

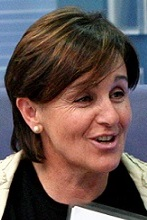

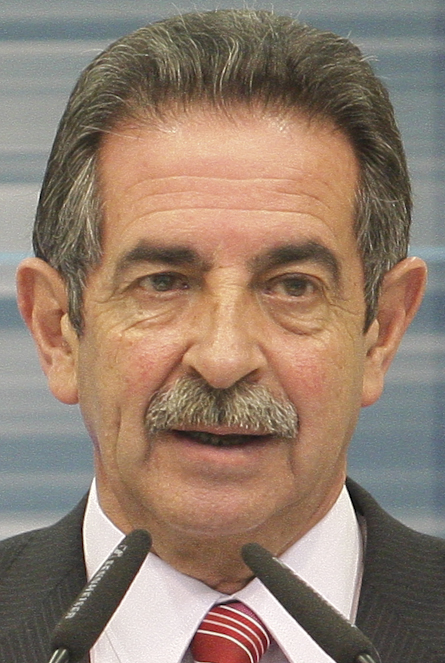
| | First party | Second party | Third party |
|---|---|---|---|
| Leader | José Joaquín Martínez Sieso | Dolores Gorostiaga | Miguel Ángel Revilla |
| Party | PP | PSOE | PRC |
| Leader since | 1995 | 16 December 2000 | 1983 |
| Last election | 19 seats, 42.5% | 14 seats, 33.1% | 6 seats, 13.5% |
| Seats won | 18 | 13 | 8 |
| Seat change | ▼1 | ▼1 | ▲2 |
| Popular vote | 146,796 | 103,608 | 66,480 |
| Percentage | 42.5% | 30.0% | 19.2% |
| Swing | 0.0 pp | ▼3.1 pp | ▲5.7 pp |
President before election
José Joaquín Martínez Sieso
PP
Elected President
Miguel Ángel Revilla
PRC

The 2003 Cantabrian regional election was held on 25 May 2003 to elect the 6th Parliament of the autonomous community of Cantabria. All 39 seats in the Parliament were up for election. It was held concurrently with regional elections in 12 other autonomous communities and local elections all throughout Spain.

Both the People's Party (PP) and the Spanish Socialist Workers' Party (PSOE) lost 1 seat each to the Regionalist Party of Cantabria (PRC), which won 8 seats. As neither had won an absolute majority, the PRC reinforced its position as parliamentary kingmaker, able to give the government to either of the two parties. The PRC, in a coalition with the PP since 1995, announced that it was not renewing the pact a third time due to "deteriorating relations" between both parties after 8 years of government, and that it would instead seek an alliance with the PSOE.

As a result of the election, PSOE and PRC reached a coalition agreement in which Miguel Ángel Revilla from the PRC was to be elected as regional President.

== Overview ==
=== Electoral system ===
The Parliament of Cantabria was the devolved, unicameral legislature of the autonomous community of Cantabria, having legislative power in regional matters as defined by the Spanish Constitution and the Cantabrian Statute of Autonomy, as well as the ability to vote confidence in or withdraw it from a President of the Autonomous Community. Voting for the Parliament was on the basis of universal suffrage, which comprised all nationals over 18 years of age, registered in Cantabria and in full enjoyment of their political rights.

The 39 members of the Parliament of Cantabria were elected using the D'Hondt method and a closed list proportional representation, with an electoral threshold of five percent of valid votes—which included blank ballots—being applied regionally.

The electoral law provided that parties, federations, coalitions and groupings of electors were allowed to present lists of candidates. However, groupings of electors were required to secure the signature of at least 1 percent of the electors registered in Cantabria. Electors were barred from signing for more than one list of candidates. Concurrently, parties and federations intending to enter in coalition to take part jointly at an election were required to inform the relevant Electoral Commission within ten days of the election being called.

=== Election date ===
The term of the Parliament of Cantabria expired four years after the date of its previous election. Elections to the Parliament were fixed for the fourth Sunday of May every four years. The previous election was held on 13 June 1999, setting the election date for the Parliament on 25 May 2003.

The President of the Autonomous Community had the prerogative to dissolve the Parliament of Cantabria and call a snap election, provided that no motion of no confidence was in process, no nationwide election was due and some time requirements were met: namely, that dissolution did not occur either during the first legislative session or within the legislature's last year ahead of its scheduled expiry, nor before one year has elapsed since a previous dissolution. In the event of an investiture process failing to elect a regional President within a two-month period from the first ballot, the Parliament was to be automatically dissolved and a fresh election called. Any snap election held as a result of these circumstances would not alter the period to the next ordinary election, with elected lawmakers serving the remainder of its original four-year term.

== Opinion polls ==
The table below lists voting intention estimates in reverse chronological order, showing the most recent first and using the dates when the survey fieldwork was done, as opposed to the date of publication. Where the fieldwork dates are unknown, the date of publication is given instead. The highest percentage figure in each polling survey is displayed with its background shaded in the leading party's colour. If a tie ensues, this is applied to the figures with the highest percentages. The "Lead" column on the right shows the percentage-point difference between the parties with the highest percentages in a poll. When available, seat projections determined by the polling organisations are displayed below (or in place of) the percentages in a smaller font; 20 seats were required for an absolute majority in the Parliament of Cantabria.

Color key:

Exit poll

| Polling firm/Commissioner | Fieldwork date | Sample size | Turnout | PP | PSOE | PRC | IU | Lead |
|---|---|---|---|---|---|---|---|---|
| 2003 regional election | 25 May 2003 | —N/a | 68.8 | 42.5; 19 | 33.1; 14 | 13.5; 6 | 3.7; 0 | 9.4 |
| Sigma Dos/Antena 3 | 25 May 2003 | ? | ? | ? 16/17 | ? 16/17 | ? 6 | ? 0 | Tie |
| Ipsos–Eco/RTVE | 25 May 2003 | ? | ? | ? 17/19 | ? 12/14 | ? 6/8 | ? 0/2 | ? |
| CIS | 22 Mar–28 Apr 2003 | 797 | 73.5 | 40.5; 18 | 33.5; 15 | 14.4; 6 | 4.8; 0 | 7.0 |
| CIS | 9 Sep–9 Oct 2002 | 445 | 71.0 | 44.2 | 32.8 | 13.2 | 5.9 | 11.4 |
| 2000 general election | 12 Mar 2000 | —N/a | 71.8 | 56.8 (23) | 33.5 (14) | – | 5.0 (2) | 23.3 |
| 1999 regional election | 13 Jun 1999 | —N/a | 68.8 | 42.5; 19 | 33.1; 14 | 13.5; 6 | 3.7; 0 | 9.4 |

== Results ==
← Summary of the 25 May 2003 Parliament of Cantabria election results →
| Parties and alliances | Popular vote | | | Seats | |
| Parties and alliances | Votes | % | ±pp | Total | +/− |
|---|---|---|---|---|---|
| People's Party (PP) | 146,796 | 42.49 | −0.01 | 18 | −1 |
| Spanish Socialist Workers' Party (PSOE) | 103,608 | 29.99 | −3.09 | 13 | −1 |
| Regionalist Party of Cantabria (PRC) | 66,480 | 19.24 | +5.73 | 8 | +2 |
| United Left of Cantabria (IUC) | 12,770 | 3.70 | +0.01 | 0 | ±0 |
| Cantabrian Unity (UCn) | 5,515 | 1.60 | New | 0 | ±0 |
| Cantabrian Nationalist Council (CNC) | 1,670 | 0.48 | +0.11 | 0 | ±0 |
| Independent Citizens of Cantabria (CCII) | 817 | 0.24 | −0.05 | 0 | ±0 |
| Democratic and Social Centre (CDS) | 660 | 0.19 | −0.28 | 0 | ±0 |
| Blank ballots | 7,202 | 2.08 | −0.35 | | |
| Total | 345,518 | | | 39 | ±0 |
| Valid votes | 345,518 | 99.18 | −0.03 | | |
| Invalid votes | 2,859 | 0.82 | +0.03 | | |
| Votes cast / turnout | 348,377 | 73.05 | +4.27 | | |
| Abstentions | 128,547 | 26.95 | −4.27 | | |
| Registered voters | 476,924 | | | | |

Popular vote
| PP | 42.49% |
| PSOE | 29.99% |
| PRC | 19.24% |
| IUC | 3.70% |
| UCn | 1.60% |
| Others | 0.91% |
| Blank ballots | 2.08% |

Seats
| PP | 46.15% |
| PSOE | 33.33% |
| PRC | 20.51% |

== Aftermath ==
Investiture; Miguel Ángel Revilla (PRC)
| Ballot → | 27 June 2003 |
| Required majority → | 20 out of 39 |
| Yes: • PSOE (13); • PRC (8) | 21 / 39 |
| No: • PP (18) | 18 / 39 |
| Abstentions | 0 / 39 |
| Absentees | 0 / 39 |
