= 2015 Cantabrian regional election =

Election in the Spanish region of Cantabria

- 24 May 2015

All 35 seats in the Parliament of Cantabria 18 seats needed for a majority
- Opinion polls
- Registered: 499,596 ▲0.9%
- Turnout: 330,868 (66.2%) ▲1.2 pp
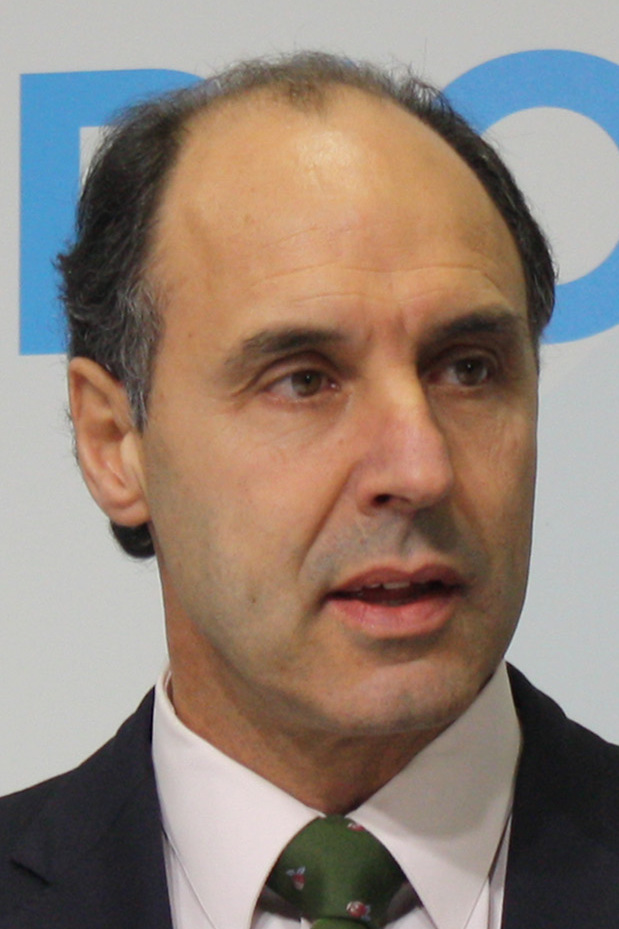

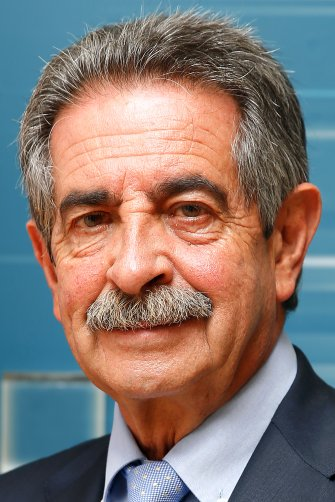

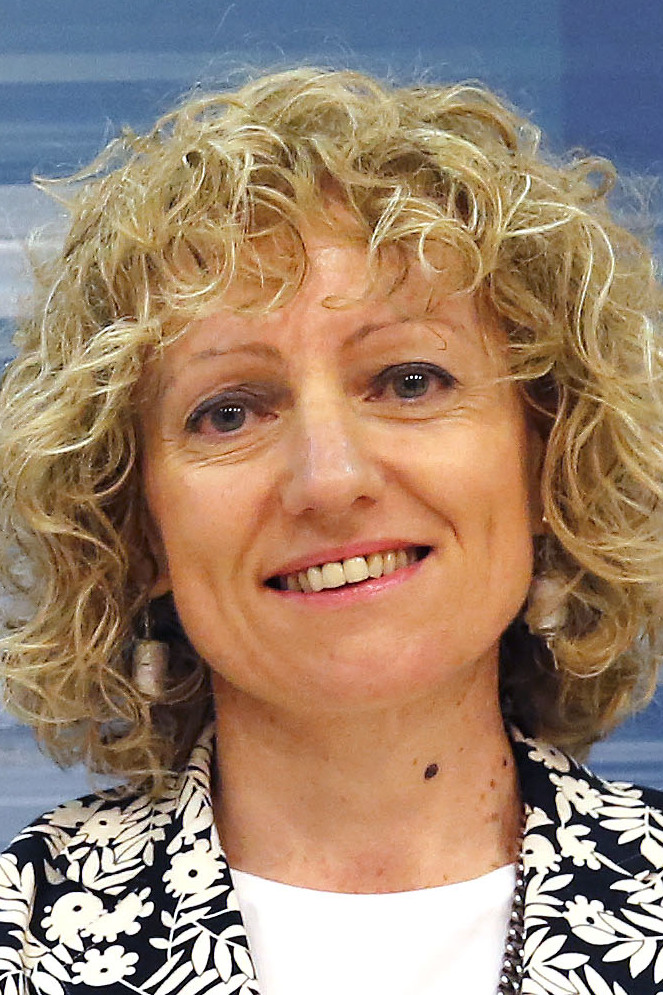

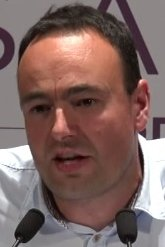

	First party	Second party	Third party
Leader	Ignacio Diego	Miguel Ángel Revilla	Eva Díaz Tezanos
Party	PP	PRC	PSOE
Leader since	13 November 2004	1983	31 March 2012
Last election	20 seats, 46.1%	12 seats, 29.1%	7 seats, 16.4%
Seats won	13	12	5
Seat change	▼7	0	▼2
Popular vote	105,944	97,185	45,653
Percentage	32.6%	29.9%	14.0%
Swing	▼13.5 pp	▲0.8 pp	▼2.4 pp
	Fourth party	Fifth party
Leader	José Ramón Blanco	Rubén Gómez
Party	Podemos	C's
Leader since	14 February 2015	9 April 2015
Last election	Did not contest	Did not contest
Seats won	3	2
Seat change	▲3	▲2
Popular vote	28,895	22,552
Percentage	8.9%	6.9%
Swing	New party	New party
President before election
Ignacio Diego
PP
Elected President
Miguel Ángel Revilla
PRC

The 2015 Cantabrian regional election was held on 24 May 2015 to elect the 9th Parliament of the autonomous community of Cantabria. All 35 seats in the Parliament were up for election. It was held concurrently with regional elections in 12 other autonomous communities and local elections all throughout Spain.

== Overview ==
=== Electoral system ===
The Parliament of Cantabria was the devolved, unicameral legislature of the autonomous community of Cantabria, having legislative power in regional matters as defined by the Spanish Constitution and the Cantabrian Statute of Autonomy, as well as the ability to vote confidence in or withdraw it from a President of the Autonomous Community. Voting for the Parliament was on the basis of universal suffrage, which comprised all nationals over 18 years of age, registered in Cantabria and in full enjoyment of their political rights. Additionally, Cantabrians abroad were required to apply for voting before being permitted to vote, a system known as "begged" or expat vote (Spanish: Voto rogado).

The 35 members of the Parliament of Cantabria were elected using the D'Hondt method and a closed list proportional representation, with an electoral threshold of five percent of valid votes—which included blank ballots—being applied regionally.

The electoral law provided that parties, federations, coalitions and groupings of electors were allowed to present lists of candidates. However, groupings of electors were required to secure the signature of at least 1 percent of the electors registered in Cantabria. Electors were barred from signing for more than one list of candidates. Concurrently, parties and federations intending to enter in coalition to take part jointly at an election were required to inform the relevant Electoral Commission within ten days of the election being called.

=== Election date ===
The term of the Parliament of Cantabria expired four years after the date of its previous election. Elections to the Parliament were fixed for the fourth Sunday of May every four years. The previous election was held on 22 May 2011, setting the election date for the Parliament on 24 May 2015.

The President of the Autonomous Community had the prerogative to dissolve the Parliament of Cantabria and call a snap election, provided that no motion of no confidence was in process, no nationwide election was due and some time requirements were met: namely, that dissolution did not occur either during the first legislative session or within the legislature's last year ahead of its scheduled expiry, nor before one year had elapsed since a previous dissolution. In the event of an investiture process failing to elect a regional President within a two-month period from the first ballot, the Parliament was to be automatically dissolved and a fresh election called. Any snap election held as a result of these circumstances would not alter the period to the next ordinary election, with elected lawmakers serving the remainder of its original four-year term.

== Opinion polls ==
The table below lists voting intention estimates in reverse chronological order, showing the most recent first and using the dates when the survey fieldwork was done, as opposed to the date of publication. Where the fieldwork dates are unknown, the date of publication is given instead. The highest percentage figure in each polling survey is displayed with its background shaded in the leading party's colour. If a tie ensues, this is applied to the figures with the highest percentages. The "Lead" column on the right shows the percentage-point difference between the parties with the highest percentages in a poll. When available, seat projections determined by the polling organisations are displayed below (or in place of) the percentages in a smaller font; 18 seats were required for an absolute majority in the Parliament of Cantabria (20 until 1 June 2012).

Color key:

Poll conducted after legal ban on opinion polls

Polling firm/Commissioner	Fieldwork date	Sample size	Turnout	PP	PRC	PSOE	IU	UPyD	Podemos	C's	Lead
2015 regional election	24 May 2015	—N/a	66.2	32.6; 13	29.9; 12	14.0; 5	2.5; 0	0.7; 0	8.9; 3	6.9; 2	2.7
GAD3/Antena 3	11–22 May 2015	?	?	? 15/16	? 9/10	? 5/6	–	–	? 0/2	? 3/4	?
GAD3/ABC	17 May 2015	?	?	37.5; 14/15	22.3; 8/9	15.7; 6	–	–	7.4; 2/3	10.3; 4	15.2
NC Report/La Razón	17 May 2015	400	?	36.2; 13	24.2; 9	15.3; 5	2.8; 0	0.7; 0	10.2; 3	8.9; 3	12.0
Ikerfel/El Diario Montañés	5–9 May 2015	2,000	?	34.7; 13/14	21.8; 8/9	15.7; 6	4.0; 0	1.4; 0	8.8; 3	11.9; 4/5	12.9
PP	1 May 2015	?	?	? 15/17	? 7/9	? 5/7	–	–	? 2	? 3	?
CIS	23 Mar–19 Apr 2015	799	?	33.2; 13/14	22.4; 8/9	16.3; 6	3.0; 0	1.6; 0	9.5; 3	10.3; 4	10.8
NC Report/La Razón	17–26 Mar 2015	400	?	35.9; 13/14	20.1; 7/8	15.1; 5/6	2.7; 0	1.1; 0	12.7; 3/4	10.1; 3/4	15.8
Ikerfel/El Diario Montañés	23 Feb–3 Mar 2015	1,800	?	34.8; 13/14	17.6; 6/7	15.3; 5/6	4.1; 0	–	13.1; 5	12.5; 4/5	17.2
PP	2 Feb 2015	?	?	? 14/16	? 8/10	? 5/6	–	–	? 5/6	–	?
PP	10 Nov 2014	?	?	? 16	? 9	? 5	–	–	? 5	–	?
SyM Consulting	1–5 Nov 2014	508	69.9	36.8; 14	12.6; 4/6	21.8; 8	6.0; 2/3	5.9; 2	13.4; 5	–	15.0
Llorente & Cuenca	31 Oct 2014	?	?	? 13/15	? 9/10	? 4	? 1/2	? 0/1	? 4/5	–	?
2014 EP election	25 May 2014	—N/a	44.1	34.7 (15)	–	24.3 (10)	9.0 (3)	8.2 (3)	9.2 (4)	3.0 (0)	10.4
SyM Consulting	6–9 Feb 2014	516	70.7	36.9; 14	27.7; 10/11	16.8; 6	7.7; 2/3	6.3; 2	–	–	9.2
NC Report/La Razón	15 Oct–12 Nov 2013	?	?	39.6; 15/16	30.6; 11/12	16.7; 6/7	? 2	–	–	–	9.0
SyM Consulting	24–27 Sep 2013	450	77.2	36.7; 14/16	24.3; 9/10	17.2; 5/6	7.7; 2/3	? 2/3	–	–	12.4
NC Report/La Razón	15 Apr–10 May 2013	200	?	39.8; 15/16	30.8; 11/12	16.2; 6/7	6.1; 2	–	–	–	9.0
2011 general election	20 Nov 2011	—N/a	71.6	52.2 (23)	12.5 (5)	25.2 (11)	3.6 (0)	3.6 (0)	–	–	27.0
2011 regional election	22 May 2011	—N/a	69.8	46.1; 20	29.1; 12	16.4; 7	3.3*; 0	1.7; 0	–	–	17.0
(*) Results for Social and Ecologist Left.

== Results ==
← Summary of the 24 May 2015 Parliament of Cantabria election results →
Parties and alliances	Popular vote			Seats	
Parties and alliances	Votes	%	±pp	Total	+/−
People's Party (PP)	105,944	32.58	−13.51	13	−7
Regionalist Party of Cantabria (PRC)	97,185	29.89	+0.77	12	±0
Spanish Socialist Workers' Party (PSOE)	45,653	14.04	−2.32	5	−2
We Can (Podemos)	28,895	8.89	New	3	+3
Citizens–Party of the Citizenry (C's)	22,552	6.94	New	2	+2
United Left (IU)^{1}	8,246	2.54	−0.78	0	±0
Union, Progress and Democracy (UPyD)	2,380	0.73	−0.99	0	±0
Animalist Party Against Mistreatment of Animals (PACMA)	1,965	0.60	New	0	±0
For Cantabria Yes (Sí)	1,852	0.57	New	0	±0
Equo (Equo)	1,592	0.49	New	0	±0
Let's Win Cantabria (Ganemos)	1,417	0.44	New	0	±0
Vox (Vox)	1,119	0.34	New	0	±0
Communist Party of the Peoples of Spain (PCPE)	562	0.17	−0.16	0	±0
Engine and Sports Alternative (AMD)	495	0.15	−0.12	0	±0
Internationalist Solidarity and Self-Management (SAIn)	251	0.08	−0.07	0	±0
Blank ballots	5,025	1.55	−0.61		
Total	325,133			35	−4
Valid votes	325,133	98.27	−0.03		
Invalid votes	5,735	1.73	+0.03		
Votes cast / turnout	330,868	66.23	−3.56		
Abstentions	168,728	33.77	+3.56		
Registered voters	499,596				
Sources
Footnotes: ^{1} United Left results are compared to Social and Ecologist Left totals in the 2011 election.

Popular vote
PP	32.58%
PRC	29.89%
PSOE	14.04%
Podemos	8.89%
C's	6.94%
IU	2.54%
Others	3.58%
Blank ballots	1.55%

Seats
PP	37.14%
PRC	34.29%
PSOE	14.29%
Podemos	8.57%
C's	5.71%

== Aftermath ==
Investiture; Miguel Ángel Revilla (PRC)
Ballot →	1 July 2015	3 July 2015
Required majority →	18 out of 35	Simple
Yes: • PRC (12); • PSOE (5)	17 / 35	17 / 35
No: • PP (13); • C's (2)	15 / 35	15 / 35
Abstentions: • Podemos (3)	3 / 35	3 / 35
Absentees	0 / 35	0 / 35
