= 2011 Cantabrian regional election =

Election in the Spanish region of Cantabria

- 22 May 2011

All 39 seats in the Parliament of Cantabria 20 seats needed for a majority
- Opinion polls
- Registered: 494,955 ▲1.9%
- Turnout: 345,439 (69.8%) ▼2.2 pp
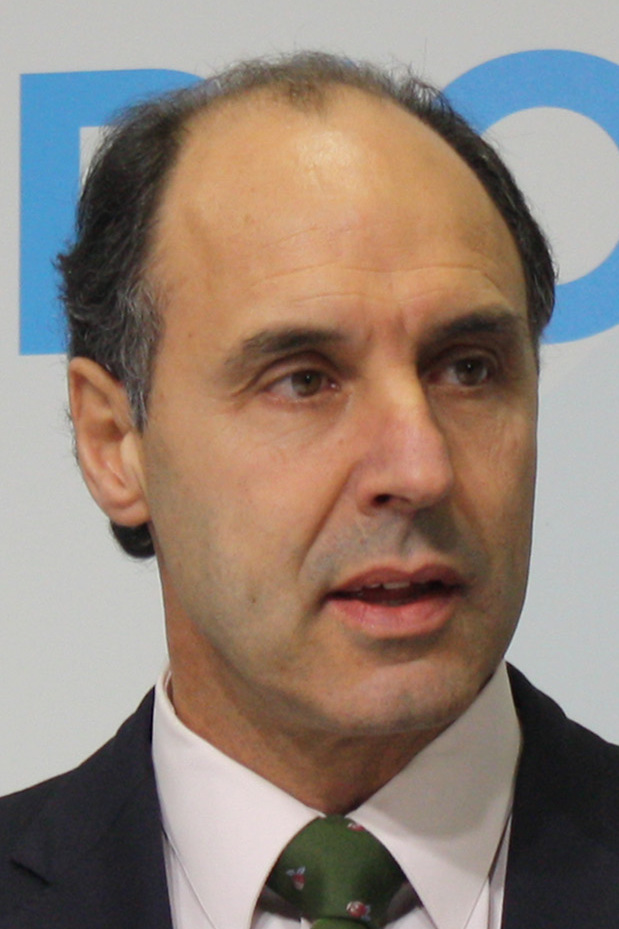

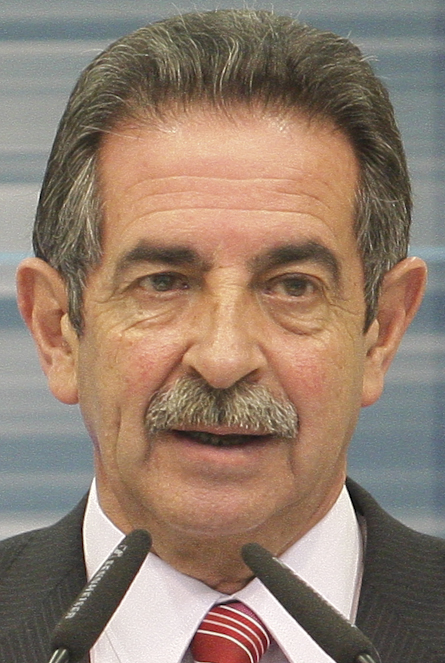

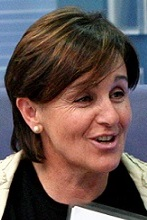
	First party	Second party	Third party
Leader	Ignacio Diego	Miguel Ángel Revilla	Dolores Gorostiaga
Party	PP	PRC	PSOE
Leader since	13 November 2004	1983	16 December 2000
Last election	17 seats, 41.5%	12 seats, 28.6%	10 seats, 24.5%
Seats won	20	12	7
Seat change	▲3	0	▼3
Popular vote	156,499	98,887	55,541
Percentage	46.1%	29.1%	16.4%
Swing	▲4.6 pp	▲0.5 pp	▼8.1 pp
President before election
Miguel Ángel Revilla
PRC
Elected President
Ignacio Diego
PP

The 2011 Cantabrian regional election was held on 22 May 2011 to elect the 8th Parliament of the autonomous community of Cantabria. All 39 seats in the Parliament were up for election. It was held concurrently with regional elections in 12 other autonomous communities and local elections all throughout Spain.

The Regionalist Party of Cantabria (PRC) and the Spanish Socialist Workers' Party (PSOE) had formed the government of the region since the 2003 election. However, the election was won by the People's Party (PP) which gained three seats from the PSOE. This was the first absolute majority of seats won by the PP, although its predecessor, the People's Alliance achieved the same feat at the 1983 election under the banner of the People's Coalition.

== Overview ==
=== Electoral system ===
The Parliament of Cantabria was the devolved, unicameral legislature of the autonomous community of Cantabria, having legislative power in regional matters as defined by the Spanish Constitution and the Cantabrian Statute of Autonomy, as well as the ability to vote confidence in or withdraw it from a President of the Autonomous Community. Voting for the Parliament was on the basis of universal suffrage, which comprised all nationals over 18 years of age, registered in Cantabria and in full enjoyment of their political rights. Amendments to the electoral law in 2011 required for Cantabrians abroad to apply for voting before being permitted to vote, a system known as "begged" or expat vote (Spanish: Voto rogado).

The 39 members of the Parliament of Cantabria were elected using the D'Hondt method and a closed list proportional representation, with an electoral threshold of five percent of valid votes—which included blank ballots—being applied regionally.

The electoral law provided that parties, federations, coalitions and groupings of electors were allowed to present lists of candidates. However, groupings of electors were required to secure the signature of at least 1 percent of the electors registered in Cantabria. Electors were barred from signing for more than one list of candidates. Concurrently, parties and federations intending to enter in coalition to take part jointly at an election were required to inform the relevant Electoral Commission within ten days of the election being called.

=== Election date ===
The term of the Parliament of Cantabria expired four years after the date of its previous election. Elections to the Parliament were fixed for the fourth Sunday of May every four years. The previous election was held on 27 May 2007, setting the election date for the Parliament on 22 May 2011.

The President of the Autonomous Community had the prerogative to dissolve the Parliament of Cantabria and call a snap election, provided that no motion of no confidence was in process, no nationwide election was due and some time requirements were met: namely, that dissolution did not occur either during the first legislative session or within the legislature's last year ahead of its scheduled expiry, nor before one year has elapsed since a previous dissolution. In the event of an investiture process failing to elect a regional President within a two-month period from the first ballot, the Parliament was to be automatically dissolved and a fresh election called. Any snap election held as a result of these circumstances would not alter the period to the next ordinary election, with elected lawmakers serving the remainder of its original four-year term.

== Opinion polls ==
The table below lists voting intention estimates in reverse chronological order, showing the most recent first and using the dates when the survey fieldwork was done, as opposed to the date of publication. Where the fieldwork dates are unknown, the date of publication is given instead. The highest percentage figure in each polling survey is displayed with its background shaded in the leading party's colour. If a tie ensues, this is applied to the figures with the highest percentages. The "Lead" column on the right shows the percentage-point difference between the parties with the highest percentages in a poll. When available, seat projections determined by the polling organisations are displayed below (or in place of) the percentages in a smaller font; 20 seats were required for an absolute majority in the Parliament of Cantabria.

Polling firm/Commissioner	Fieldwork date	Sample size	Turnout	PP	PRC	PSOE	IU	UPyD	Lead
2011 regional election	22 May 2011	—N/a	69.8	46.1; 20	29.1; 12	16.4; 7	3.3; 0	1.7; 0	17.0
NC Report/La Razón (Note: "El PP doblega al PSOE a siete días de la cita electoral". La Razón (in Spanish). 15 May 2011. Archived from the original on 3 September 2011.)	3–10 May 2011	?	?	43.9; 19/20	? 11/12	? 8	–	–	?
TNS Demoscopia/Antena 3	3–4 May 2011	500	?	45.5; 19/20	27.7; 12	17.9; 7/8	–	–	17.8
Ikerfel/Vocento	21–28 Apr 2011	2,500	?	43.3; 18/19	28.4; 11/12	22.0; 9	2.3; 0	–	14.9
NC Report/La Razón	25 Apr 2011	?	?	45.9; 20	26.3; 11	20.8; 8	2.9; 0	–	19.6
Celeste-Tel/Terra	13–20 Apr 2011	400	?	45.9; 20	27.3; 11	18.3; 7	3.4; 1	–	18.6
CIS	17 Mar–17 Apr 2011	800	?	40.9; 18	29.6; 13	19.7; 8	2.8; 0	2.5; 0	11.3
Sigma Dos/El Mundo	11–14 Apr 2011	400	?	48.7; 20/21	25.2; 10/11	20.3; 8	–	–	23.5
Ikerfel/El Diario Montañés	30 Mar–3 Apr 2011	600	?	41.3; 17/18	29.5; 12/13	21.4; 9	–	–	11.8
GAD/ABC	22–25 Feb 2011	600	?	46.2; 19/20	27.9; 11/12	19.1; 7/8	–	–	18.3
Sigma Dos/El Mundo	22–27 Dec 2010	400	?	47.7; 20/21	26.1; 10/11	20.4; 8	–	–	21.6
Sigma Dos/El Mundo	17–19 May 2010	400	?	48.1; 20	25.2; 10/11	21.4; 8/9	2.2; 0	–	22.9
Área Consulting y Estrategias	25 Jan–3 Feb 2010	800	?	44.1; 19/20	28.7; 12/13	17.6; 7	3.6; 0	–	15.4
2009 EP election	7 Jun 2009	—N/a	50.8	50.7 (22)	–	39.9 (17)	2.0 (0)	3.2 (0)	10.8
2008 general election	9 Mar 2008	—N/a	76.4	50.0 (21)	–	43.6 (18)	2.3 (0)	1.4 (0)	6.4
2007 regional election	27 May 2007	—N/a	72.0	41.5; 17	28.6; 12	24.5; 10	1.9*; 0	–	12.9
(*) Results for Assembly for Cantabria.

== Results ==
← Summary of the 22 May 2011 Parliament of Cantabria election results →
Parties and alliances	Popular vote			Seats	
Parties and alliances	Votes	%	±pp	Total	+/−
People's Party (PP)	156,499	46.09	+4.61	20	+3
Regionalist Party of Cantabria (PRC)	98,887	29.12	+0.48	12	±0
Spanish Socialist Workers' Party (PSOE)	55,541	16.36	−8.18	7	−3
Social and Ecologist Left (IU–IA)^{1}	11,277	3.32	+1.44	0	±0
Union, Progress and Democracy (UPyD)	5,835	1.72	New	0	±0
National Front–Republican Social Movement (FrN–MSR)	1,257	0.37	New	0	±0
Communist Party of the Peoples of Spain (PCPE)	1,108	0.33	+0.12	0	±0
Engine and Sports Alternative (AMD)	916	0.27	+0.15	0	±0
Internationalist Solidarity and Self-Management (SAIn)	517	0.15	New	0	±0
Liberal Democratic Centre (CDL)	387	0.11	−0.08	0	±0
Blank ballots	7,328	2.16	+0.45		
Total	339,552			39	±0
Valid votes	339,552	98.30	−0.76		
Invalid votes	5,887	1.70	+0.76		
Votes cast / turnout	345,439	69.79	−2.18		
Abstentions	149,516	30.21	+2.18		
Registered voters	494,955				
Sources
Footnotes: ^{1} Social and Ecologist Left results are compared to Assembly for Cantabria totals in the 2007 election.

Popular vote
PP	46.09%
PRC	29.12%
PSOE	16.36%
IU–IA	3.32%
UPyD	1.72%
Others	1.23%
Blank ballots	2.16%

Seats
PP	51.28%
PRC	30.77%
PSOE	17.95%

== Aftermath ==
Investiture; Ignacio Diego (PP)
Ballot →	23 June 2011
Required majority →	20 out of 39
Yes: • PP (20)	20 / 39
No: • PRC (12); • PSOE (7)	19 / 39
Abstentions	0 / 39
Absentees	0 / 39
