= Cantabrian Unity =

- Founded: 2002
- Dissolved: 2011
- Headquarters: Torrelavega, Cantabria
- Ideology: Regionalism

Cantabrian Unity (Spanish: Unidad Cántabra) was a Cantabrian political party based in Torrelavega. Cantabrian Unity was founded in early 2000 by breakaway members of the Regionalist Party of Cantabria and the defunct Union for the Progress of Cantabria headed by Juan Hormaechea. The party participated in municipal elections in Cantabria in 2003, where it received about 5,500 votes. It was dissolved in 2011.
