= Communist Party of Cantabria =

The Communist Party of Cantabria (in Spanish: Partido Comunista de Cantabria) is the federation of the Communist Party of Spain (PCE), and is headquartered in Santander, Cantabria.

The party was founded in 1921, alongside the main party, as well as other regional communist branches, following the Russian Revolution.
