= Cantabrian Nationalist Council =

Cantabrian political party

Cantabrian Nationalist Council Conceju Nacionaliegu Cántabru
- Leader: Raúl Huerta Fernández
- Founded: 1995
- Ideology: Cantabrian nationalism Left-wing nationalism Socialism; Environmentalism
- Political position: Left-wing
- National affiliation: Europe of the Peoples
- Trade union affiliation: Intersindical Cántabra

Website
- conceju.com

Cantabrian Nationalist Council (Cantabrian: Conceju Nacionaliegu Cántabru, CNC) was a political party with a nationalist and left-wing ideology. It was formed in Cantabria in 1995.

== History ==
The CNC was founded in 1995 and held its first congress in 1996 at Torrelavega The first name of the party was Conceju Cantabrista (CoC, Cantabrist Council), an assembly-based nationalist and leftist Cantabrian political party, with its headquarters in Torrelavega. In 1998 the party changed the name to its current form. In 1999 they presented lists to the local elections, and won 1,149 votes in the municipalities of Santander, Barcena de Cicero and Bareyo. In the general elections of 2000 they won 2,103 votes. In 2001 the CNC announced a demonstration for the Day of Cantabria, but it was banned by the authorities. In the 2003 Cantabrian elections, the CNC obtained 1,670 votes in the regional elections and 1.131 in the local ones (presented lists in Santander (640 votes, 0.63%), Torrelavega (194 votes, 0.55%), Camargo (135 votes, 0.86%), Colindres (61 votes, 1.34%), Medio Cudeyo (12 votes, 0.28%), Comillas (32 votes, 1.79%), Barcena de Cicero (32 votes, 1.73%) and Alfoz of Lloredo (25 votes, 1.32%) and candidates in the concejos of Cicero, Hermosa and Zurita).

Their website was last active in 2014 and was CNC was absent in a few elections before this. Their last tweet was in 2018 regarding the foundation of "Cantabristas", a new left-wing nationalist party in the region.

== Elections ==
Year	Elections	Votes	%	Seats	Position
1999	Cantabrian parliamentary election, 1999	1.179	0,37%	0	7.
2000	Spanish general election, 2000	2.103	0,63%	0	4.
2003	Cantabrian parliamentary election, 2003	1.670	0,48%	0	6.
2004	Spanish general election, 2004	1.431	0,39%	0	4.
2004	European Parliament election in Spain, 2004	555	0,22%	0	6.
2007	Cantabrian parliamentary election, 2007	1,262	0,36%	0	5
