= José Joaquín Martínez Sieso =

Spanish politician (born 1956)

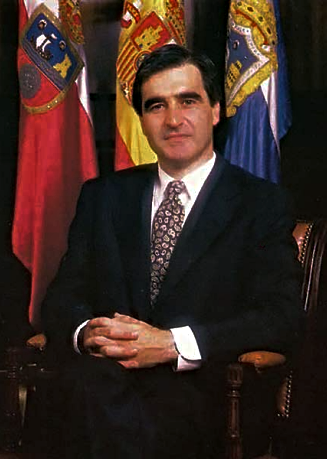

6th President of Cantabria
- In office 13 July 1995 – 27 June 2003
- Deputy: Miguel Ángel Revilla
- Preceded by: Juan Hormaechea
- Succeeded by: Miguel Ángel Revilla

Personal details
- Born: José Joaquín Martínez Sieso; 13 April 1956 (age 70) Bilbao, Biscay, Spanish State
- Party: PP

José Joaquín Martínez Sieso (born 13 April 1956) is a Spanish politician and former President of Cantabria between 1995 and 2003.
