= People's Party of Cantabria =

People's Party of Cantabria Partido Popular de Cantabria
- President: María José Sáenz de Buruaga
- Secretary-General: María José González Revuelta
- Founded: 1989
- Headquarters: Joaquín Costa, 28; Santander, Cantabria
- Ideology: Conservatism; Liberal conservatism Christian democracy Monarchism; Economic liberalism Spanish unionism
- Political position: Centre-right to right-wing
- National affiliation: People's Party
- Parliament of Cantabria: 15 / 35
- Congress of Deputies (Cantabrian seats): 2 / 5

Website
- www.ppcantabria.org

The People's Party of Cantabria (Spanish: Partido Popular de Cantabria, PP) is the regional section of the People's Party of Spain (PP) in Cantabria. It was formed in 1989 from the re-foundation of the People's Alliance.

== Election results ==
=== Parliament of Cantabria ===
Parliament of Cantabria
Election	Votes	%	Seats	+/–	Leading candidate	Government
1991	42,714	14.44 (#3)	6 / 39	13 (Note: Compared to the combined totals of People's Alliance and People's Democratic Party in the 1987 regional election.)	José Luis Vallines	Coalition (1991–1992)
1991	42,714	14.44 (#3)	6 / 39	13	José Luis Vallines	Opposition (1992–1995)
1995	104,008	32.50 (#1)	13 / 39	7	José Joaquín Martínez Sieso	Coalition
1999	134,924	42.50 (#1)	19 / 39	6	José Joaquín Martínez Sieso	Coalition
2003	146,796	42.49 (#1)	18 / 39	1	José Joaquín Martínez Sieso	Opposition
2007	143,610	41.48 (#1)	17 / 39	1	Ignacio Diego	Opposition
2011	156,499	46.09 (#1)	20 / 39	3	Ignacio Diego	Majority
2015	105,944	32.58 (#1)	13 / 35	7	Ignacio Diego	Opposition
2019	78,347	24.04 (#2)	9 / 35	4	María José Sáenz de Buruaga	Opposition
2023	116,198	35.78 (#1)	15 / 35	6	María José Sáenz de Buruaga	Majority
