= Socialist Party of Cantabria =

Socialist Party of Cantabria Partido Socialista de Cantabria
- President: Eduardo Echevarría
- Secretary-General: Pablo Zuloaga
- Headquarters: Calle Bonifaz, 18. 39003 Santander
- Youth wing: Socialist Youth of Cantabria
- Membership (2017): 2,815
- Ideology: Social democracy Progressivism
- Political position: Centre-left
- National affiliation: Spanish Socialist Workers' Party
- Congress of Deputies: 1 / 5 (Cantabrian seats)
- Spanish Senate: 1 / 5 (Cantabrian seats)
- Parliament of Cantabria: 7 / 35
- Mayors (2015-2019): 23 / 101
- Local seats (2015-2019): 190 / 1,042

Website
- www.psc-psoe.es

The Socialist Party of Cantabria-PSOE (Spanish: Partido Socialista de Cantabria-PSOE, PSC-PSOE) is the Cantabrian federation of the Spanish Socialist Workers' Party (PSOE), the main centre-left party in Spain since the 1970s.

== Electoral performance ==
=== Parliament of Cantabria ===
Parliament of Cantabria
| Election | Votes | % | # | Seats | +/– | Leading candidate | Status in legislature |
| 1983 | 107,168 | 38.41% | 2nd | 15 / 35 | — | Jaime Blanco | Opposition |
| 1987 | 87,230 | 29.57% | 2nd | 13 / 39 | 2 | Jaime Blanco | Opposition (1987–1990) |
| 1987 | 87,230 | 29.57% | 2nd | 13 / 39 | 2 | Jaime Blanco | Coalition (1990–1991) |
| 1991 | 102,958 | 34.81% | 1st | 16 / 39 | 3 | Jaime Blanco | Opposition |
| 1995 | 80,464 | 25.14% | 2nd | 10 / 39 | 6 | Julio Neira | Opposition |
| 1999 | 105,004 | 33.08% | 2nd | 14 / 39 | 4 | Ángel Duque | Opposition |
| 2003 | 103,608 | 29.99% | 2nd | 13 / 39 | 1 | Dolores Gorostiaga | Coalition |
| 2007 | 84,982 | 24.54% | 3rd | 10 / 39 | 3 | Dolores Gorostiaga | Coalition |
| 2011 | 55,541 | 16.36% | 3rd | 7 / 39 | 3 | Dolores Gorostiaga | Opposition |
| 2015 | 45,653 | 14.04% | 3rd | 5 / 35 | 2 | Eva Díaz Tezanos | Coalition |
| 2019 | 57,383 | 17.61% | 3rd | 7 / 35 | 2 | Pablo Zuloaga | Coalition |
| 2023 | 66,250 | 20.60% | 3rd | 8 / 35 | 1 | Pablo Zuloaga | Opposition |

=== Cortes Generales ===
Cortes Generales
| Election | Cantabria | | | | | | |
| Election | Congress | | | | | Senate | |
| Election | Votes | % | # | Seats | +/– | Seats | +/– |
| 1977 | 67,611 | 26.37% | 2nd | 1 / 5 | — | 1 / 4 | — |
| 1979 | 78,512 | 30.28% | 2nd | 2 / 5 | 1 | 1 / 4 | 0 |
| 1982 | 135,987 | 45.00% | 1st | 3 / 5 | 1 | 3 / 4 | 2 |
| 1986 | 129,041 | 44.33% | 1st | 3 / 5 | 0 | 3 / 4 | 0 |
| 1989 | 119,352 | 40.07% | 1st | 3 / 5 | 0 | 3 / 4 | 0 |
| 1993 | 122,418 | 37.17% | 1st | 3 / 5 | 0 | 3 / 4 | 0 |
| 1996 | 123,940 | 35.61% | 2nd | 2 / 5 | 1 | 1 / 4 | 2 |
| 2000 | 111,556 | 33.47% | 2nd | 2 / 5 | 0 | 1 / 4 | 0 |
| 2004 | 149,906 | 40.87% | 2nd | 2 / 5 | 0 | 1 / 4 | 0 |
| 2008 | 161,279 | 43.61% | 2nd | 2 / 5 | 0 | 1 / 4 | 0 |
| 2011 | 88,624 | 25.23% | 2nd | 1 / 5 | 1 | 1 / 4 | 0 |
| 2015 | 78,460 | 22.41% | 2nd | 1 / 5 | 0 | 1 / 4 | 0 |
| 2016 | 79,407 | 23.52% | 2nd | 1 / 5 | 0 | 1 / 4 | 0 |
| 2019 (Apr) | 90,534 | 25.21% | 1st | 2 / 5 | 1 | 3 / 4 | 2 |
| 2019 (Nov) | 76,028 | 23.24% | 2nd | 1 / 5 | 1 | 1 / 4 | 2 |
| 2023 | 116,596 | 33.30% | 2nd | 2 / 5 | 1 | 1 / 4 | 0 |

=== European Parliament ===
European Parliament
| Election | Cantabria | | |
| Election | Votes | % | # |
| 1987 | 107,541 | 36.28% | 1st |
| 1989 | 97,044 | 40.29% | 1st |
| 1994 | 85,052 | 32.19% | 2nd |
| 1999 | 107,218 | 34.26% | 2nd |
| 2004 | 104,564 | 42.26% | 2nd |
| 2009 | 98,907 | 39.91% | 2nd |
| 2014 | 52,250 | 24.31% | 2nd |
| 2019 | 117,508 | 37.52% | 1st |
