= United Left of Cantabria =

United Left of Cantabria Izquierda Unida de Cantabria
- General Coordinator: Jorge Crespo
- Founded: 1986; 39 years ago
- Merger of: Communist Party of Cantabria; Izquierda Abierta; Communist Youth of Cantabria; Republican Left; Independents; Party of Socialist Action (1986-2001); Progressive Federation (1986-1988); Carlist Party (1986-1987); Humanist Party (1986)
- Headquarters: C/ Isaac Peral nº1, 1ºB. Santander
- Membership (2014): 220 official members
- Ideology: Socialism; Anticapitalism; Communism; Republicanism; Feminism; Federalism
- Political position: Left-wing
- National affiliation: United Left
- Union affiliation: CCOO
- Town councillors: 16 / 1,042

Website
- iucantabria.org

United Left of Cantabria (Spanish: Izquierda Unida de Cantabria. IUC) is the Cantabrian federation of the Spanish left wing political and social movement United Left. Jorge Crespo is the current General Coordinator. The Communist Party of Cantabria (PCC-PCE, Cantabrian federation of the PCE) and Izquierda Abierta.

In the Cantabrian elections of 2011 IUC made a coalition with Izquierda Anticapitalista with the name Social and Ecologist Left.

== See also ==
- United Left (Spain)
- Communist Party of Asturias
