= Regionalist Party of Cantabria =

Regionalist Party of Cantabria Partido Regionalista de Cantabria
- Leader: Paula Fernández Viaña
- Founded: 10 November 1978
- Headquarters: Santander
- Membership (2011): 8,000
- Ideology: Autonomism; Cantabrian regionalism Progressivism; Populism
- Political position: Centre to centre-left
- Colours: Lime; Dark olive
- Congress of Deputies (Cantabrian seats): 0 / 5
- Spanish Senate (Cantabrian seats): 0 / 5
- Parliament of Cantabria: 8 / 35
- Mayors (2023-2027): 32 / 101
- Municipal Councils in Cantabria (2023-2027): 298 / 1,041

Website
- www.prc.es

The Regionalist Party of Cantabria (Spanish: Partido Regionalista de Cantabria, PRC) is the second-oldest political party in the Spanish Autonomous Community of Cantabria. The PRC originated in the Association in Defense of the Interests of Cantabria (ADIC), founded on 14 May 1976, with the objective of promoting Cantabrian autonomy.

== History ==
=== Formation and early years ===
The PRC was officially formed on 10 November 1978, under the leadership of Miguel Ángel Revilla, Manuel Izquierdo Nozal, Jose Luis Oria Toribio, Eduardo Obregón Barreda, and Juan Jose García González. The PRC participated for the first time in general elections in 1979, presenting candidates for the Spanish Senate and on 3 April of that same year went to the municipal elections with a clear goal: to obtain the representation necessary to demand from the city councils autonomy for Cantabria.

The first Regional Congress of the party took place on 8–9 December 1979 in Puente Viesgo, where the General Statutes, an ideological communication, another one about municipal interventions and a third one about agrarian policy, in addition to a project of Autonomy Statute of Cantabria were approved.

The following Congress was held in 1982 when Eduardo Obregón Barreda was chosen as General Secretary. On 8 May 1983, on the occasion of the regional and municipal elections, the PRC gained representation in the Parliament of Cantabria with two deputies and obtained 63 councillors.

In 1985, Eduardo Obregón Barreda revalidated his position of Secretary General in the third Regional Congress and two years later, on 10 June 1987, the PRC increased their institutional representation, obtaining 5 deputies in the Parliament of Cantabria and 102 councillors in the different city councils of the region. That same day European elections took place, where the party obtained 14,553 votes.

=== Miguel Ángel Revilla's leadership ===
In the fourth Regional Congress, on 20 March 1988, Miguel Ángel Revilla was elected to the General Secretariat for the first time, and has held the post since then, with the ratification of the successive congresses, held on 9 November 1991, on 13 November 1994, on 8 November 1998 and on 17 November 2002.

30 April 1988, was another important date in the trajectory of the PRC, due to its participation as an observer in a work group of regionalist parties in Valencia. The group planned a joint project and to present a united candidacy to the European elections of the following year. This work group included Navarrese People's Union, Aragonese Party, Valencian Union, Progressive Riojan Party, Majorcan Union, United Extremadura and United City of Melilla, in addition to the Regionalist Party of Cantabria, which was integrated, in June, as a member of the platform and a year later stood for the elections to European Parliament, comprising the candidacy of the Federation of Regionalist Parties (FPR). Since then, relationships have been maintained between the different regionalist parties that exist in Spain.

The following autonomous and municipal elections, on 26 May 1991, saw the PRC keep its representation in the Parliament of Cantabria, with two deputies and in the different municipalities, with a total of 69 councillors. They improved upon these results in the following elections on 28 May 1995, with 88 councillors and 6 seats, that allowed the access of the party, for the first time in their history, to the Government of Cantabria, occupying the Vice-presidency and Councils of Public Works, Culture and Agriculture, Livestock and Fisheries.

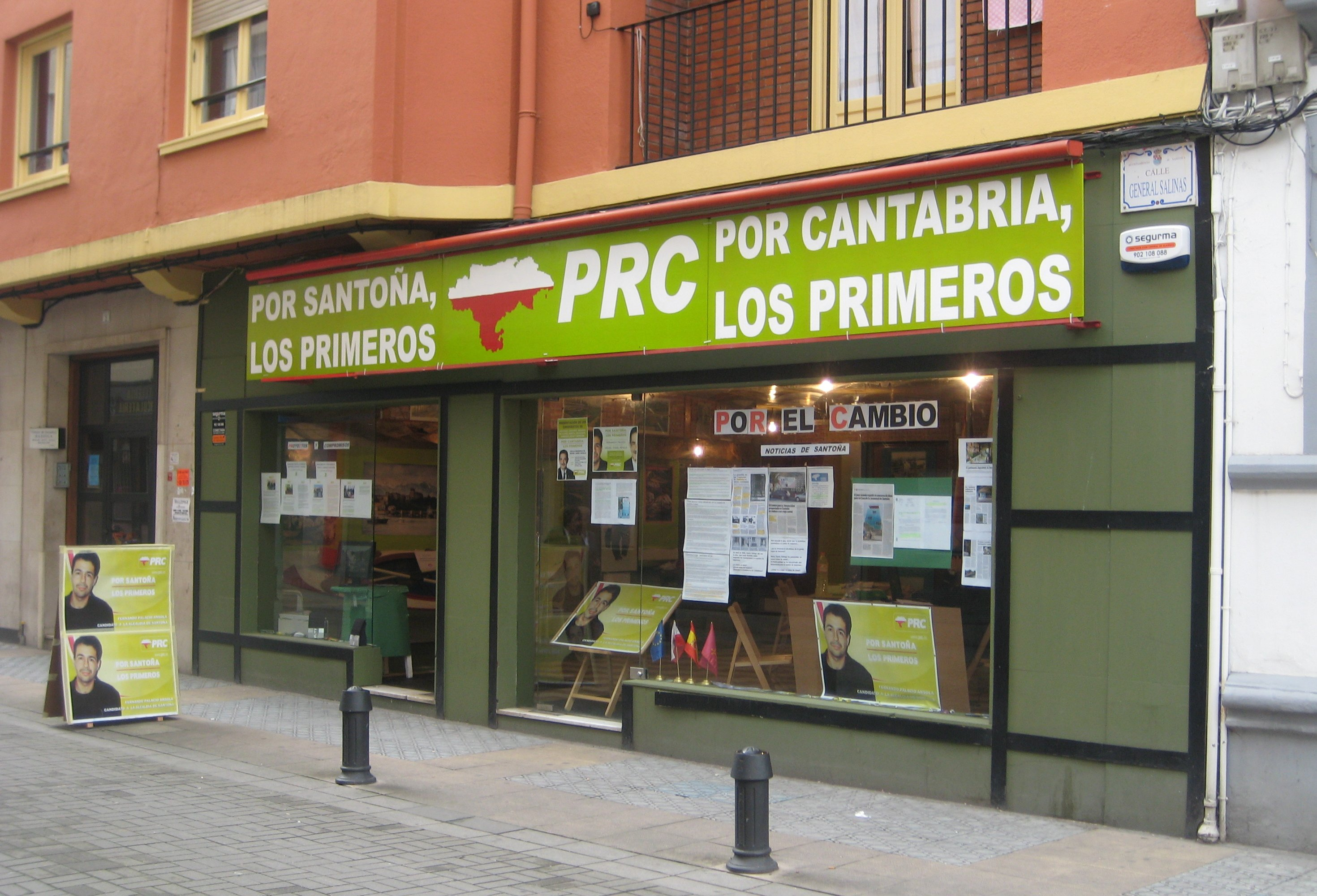
Branch in Santoña in 2011.

The elections held on 13 June 1999 resulted in a new advance in regionalist institutional representation. The PRC maintained its 6 deputies in the Parliament of Cantabria and increased its presence in the municipalities to 213 councillors, including 23 mayors. The electoral results were seen by the PRC as support for their policy to build a Cantabrian Motorway in order to end Cantabria's isolation from central Spain.

In the elections to the autonomous community, on May 25, 2003, the PRC saw the greatest growth in number of votes of any party, exactly 60 percent more than in the previous elections of 1999 and the only one that increased its parliamentary representation, rising from 6 to 8 seats. Later, on 5 June 2003, the Regionalist Party subscribed to a Coalition Pact with the Spanish Socialist Workers Party for legislature 2003-2007 and its General Secretary, Miguel Ángel Revilla, was chosen to be President of the Government of Cantabria.

In the Spanish autonomic elections, on 27 May councillors 2007, PRC underwent a new increase of votes, at the expense of the other two national parties, increasing its representation from 8 to 12 seats. The Coalition Pact with the Spanish Socialist Workers Party gave the presidency to the regionalist Miguel Ángel Revilla again.

== Electoral performance ==
=== Parliament of Cantabria ===
Parliament of Cantabria
Election	Vote	%	Score	Seats	+/–	Leader	Status
1983	18,767	6.7	3rd	2 / 35	—	Miguel Ángel Revilla	Opposition
1987	37,950	12.9	3rd	5 / 39	3	Miguel Ángel Revilla	Opposition (1987–1990)
1987	37,950	12.9	3rd	5 / 39	3	Miguel Ángel Revilla	Government (1990–1991)
1991	18,789	6.4	4th	2 / 39	3	Miguel Ángel Revilla	Opposition
1995	46,587	14.6	4th	6 / 39	4	Miguel Ángel Revilla	Government
1999	42,896	13.5	3rd	6 / 39	Steady	Miguel Ángel Revilla	Government
2003	66,480	19.2	3rd	8 / 39	2	Miguel Ángel Revilla	Government
2007	99,159	28.6	2nd	12 / 39	4	Miguel Ángel Revilla	Government
2011	98,887	29.1	2nd	12 / 39	0	Miguel Ángel Revilla	Opposition
2015	97,185	29.9	2nd	12 / 35	0	Miguel Ángel Revilla	Government
2019	122,479	37.7	1st	14 / 35	2	Miguel Ángel Revilla	Government
2023	67,523	20.8	2nd	8 / 35	6	Miguel Ángel Revilla	Opposition

=== Cortes Generales ===
Cortes Generales
Election	Congress					Senate		Status
Election	Vote	%	Score	Seats	+/–	Seats	+/–	Status
1993	18,608	0.1	23rd	0 / 350	0	0 / 208	0	No seats
2011	44,010	0.2	18th	0 / 350	0	0 / 208	0	No seats
2019 (Apr)	52,197	0.2	16th	1 / 350	1	0 / 208	0	Opposition
2019 (Nov)	68,580	0.3	16th	1 / 350	0	0 / 208	0	Opposition
2023	Did not contest			0 / 350	1	0 / 208	0	No seats

Election	Cantabria						
Election	Congress					Senate	
Election	Vote	%	Score	Seats	+/–	Seats	+/–
1993	18,608	5.7	5th	0 / 5	0	0 / 4	0
2011	44,010	12.5	3rd	0 / 5	0	0 / 4	0
2019 (Apr)	52,197	14.6	4th	1 / 5	1	0 / 4	0
2019 (Nov)	68,580	21.1	3rd	1 / 5	0	0 / 4	0
2023	Did not contest			0 / 5	1	0 / 4	0
