= 2027 Cantabrian regional election =

Election in the Spanish region of Cantabria

- 23 May 2027

All 35 seats in the Parliament of Cantabria 18 seats needed for a majority
- Opinion polls
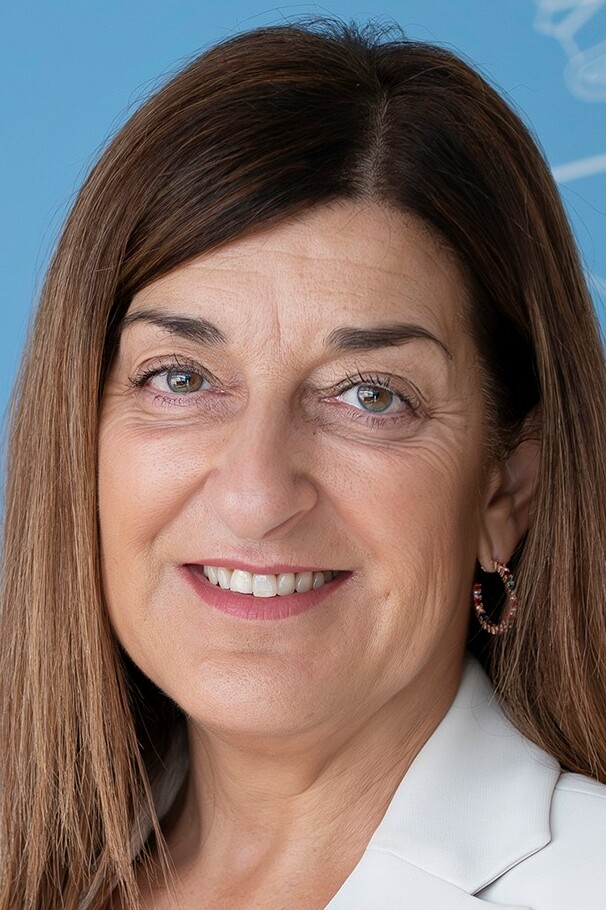

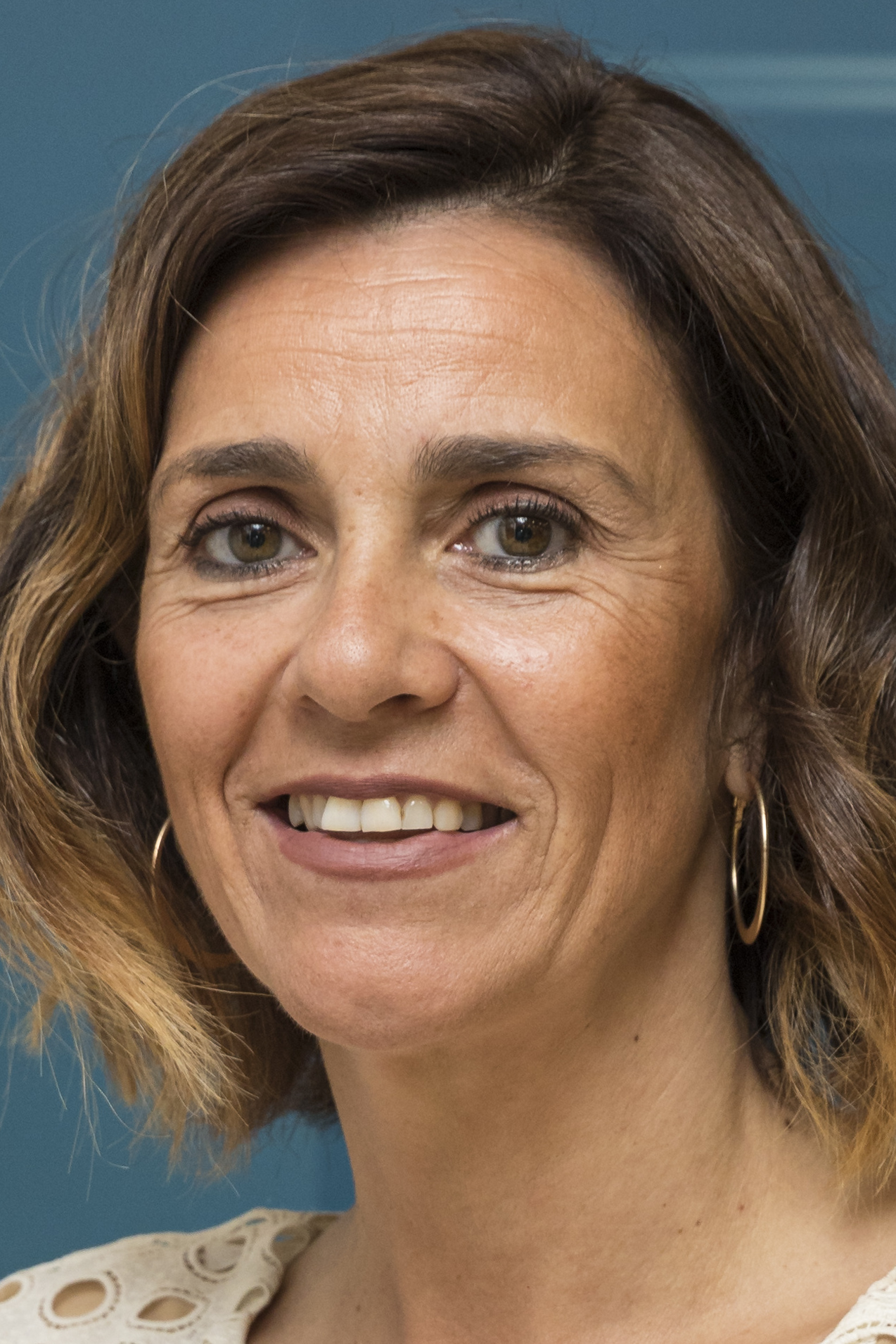

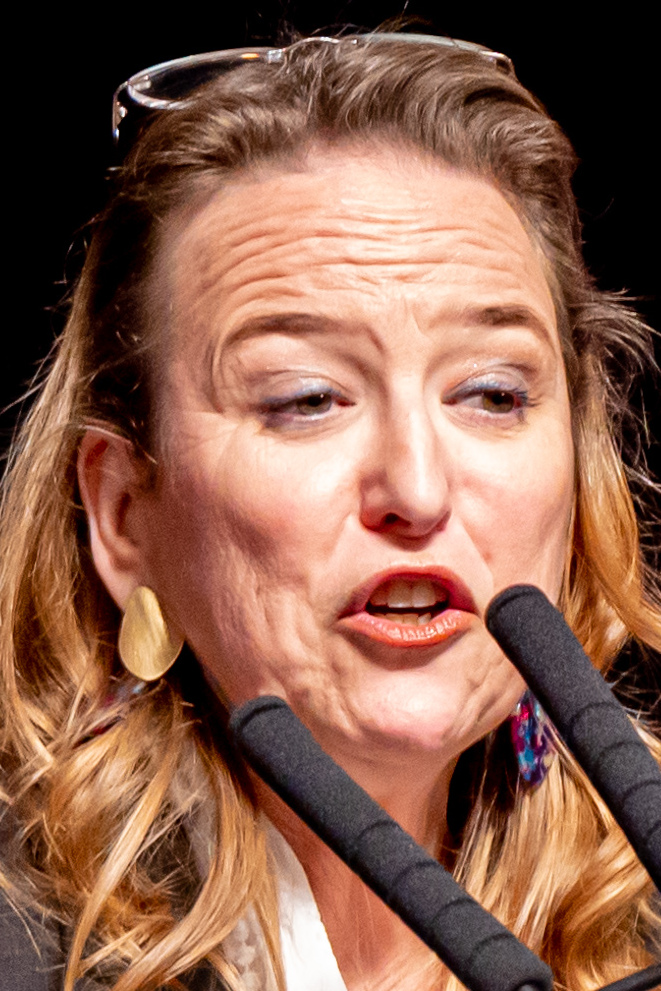
Leader	María José Sáenz de Buruaga	Paula Fernández Viaña	Pedro Casares
Party	PP	PRC	PSOE
Leader since	22 January 2019	4 May 2025	15 March 2025
Last election	15 seats, 35.8%	8 seats, 20.8%	8 seats, 20.6%
Current seats	15	8	8
Seats needed	▲3	▲10	▲10
Leader	Leticia Díaz
Party	Vox
Leader since	17 January 2023
Last election	4 seats, 11.1%
Current seats	4
Seats needed	▲14
Incumbent President
María José Sáenz de Buruaga
PP

A regional election will be held in Cantabria on 23 May 2027 to elect the 12th Parliament of the autonomous community. All 35 seats in the Parliament will be up for election. It will be held concurrently with regional elections in at least six other autonomous communities and local elections all across Spain.

== Overview ==
=== Electoral system ===
The Parliament of Cantabria is the devolved, unicameral legislature of the autonomous community of Cantabria, having legislative power in regional matters as defined by the Spanish Constitution and the Cantabrian Statute of Autonomy, as well as the ability to vote confidence in or withdraw it from a regional president. Voting for the Parliament is on the basis of universal suffrage, which comprises all nationals over 18 years of age, registered in Cantabria and in full enjoyment of their political rights.

The 35 members of the Parliament of Cantabria are elected using the D'Hondt method and a closed list proportional representation, with an electoral threshold of five percent of valid votes—which includes blank ballots—being applied regionally.

=== Election date ===
The term of the Parliament of Cantabria expires four years after the date of its previous election. Elections to the Parliament are fixed for the fourth Sunday of May every four years. The previous election was held on 28 May 2023, setting the election date for the Parliament on 23 May 2027.

The president has the prerogative to dissolve the Parliament of Cantabria and call a snap election, provided that no motion of no confidence is in process, no nationwide election is due and some time requirements are met: namely, that dissolution does not occur either during the first legislative session or within the legislature's last year ahead of its scheduled expiry, nor before one year has elapsed since a previous dissolution. In the event of an investiture process failing to elect a regional president within a two-month period from the first ballot, the Parliament is to be automatically dissolved and a fresh election called. Any snap election held as a result of these circumstances will not alter the period to the next ordinary election, with elected lawmakers serving the remainder of its original four-year term.

== Parliamentary composition ==
The table below shows the composition of the parliamentary groups in the Parliament at the present time.

Current parliamentary composition
Groups	Parties	Legislators	
Groups	Parties	Seats	Total
People's Parliamentary Group	PP	15	15
Regionalist Parliamentary Group	PRC	8	8
Socialist Parliamentary Group	PSOE	8	8
Vox Parliamentary Group	Vox	4	4

== Parties and candidates ==
The electoral law allows for parties and federations registered in the interior ministry, coalitions and groupings of electors to present lists of candidates. Parties and federations intending to form a coalition ahead of an election are required to inform the relevant Electoral Commission within ten days of the election call, whereas groupings of electors need to secure the signature of at least one percent of the electorate in Cantabria, disallowing electors from signing for more than one list of candidates.

Below is a list of the main parties and electoral alliances which will likely contest the election:

Candidacy	Parties and alliances	Candidate	Ideology	Previous result		Gov.	Ref.
Candidacy	Parties and alliances	Candidate	Ideology	Vote %	Seats	Gov.	Ref.
PP	List: People's Party (PP)	María José Sáenz de Buruaga	Conservatism; Christian democracy	35.8%	15	Yes	
PRC	List: Regionalist Party of Cantabria (PRC)	Paula Fernández Viaña	Regionalism; Centrism	20.8%	8	No	
PSOE	List: Spanish Socialist Workers' Party (PSOE)	Pedro Casares	Social democracy	20.6%	8	No	
Vox	List: Vox (Vox)	Leticia Díaz	Right-wing populism Ultranationalism; National conservatism	11.1%	4	No	

== Opinion polls ==
The tables below list opinion polling results in reverse chronological order, showing the most recent first and using the dates when the survey fieldwork was done, as opposed to the date of publication. Where the fieldwork dates are unknown, the date of publication is given instead. The highest percentage figure in each polling survey is displayed with its background shaded in the leading party's colour. If a tie ensues, this is applied to the figures with the highest percentages. The "Lead" column on the right shows the percentage-point difference between the parties with the highest percentages in a poll.

=== Voting intention estimates ===
The table below lists weighted voting intention estimates. Refusals are generally excluded from the party vote percentages, while question wording and the treatment of "don't know" responses and those not intending to vote may vary between polling organisations. When available, seat projections determined by the polling organisations are displayed below (or in place of) the percentages in a smaller font; 18 seats are required for an absolute majority in the Parliament of Cantabria.

Polling firm/Commissioner	Fieldwork date	Sample size	Turnout	PP	PRC	PSOE	Vox	Podemos	CS	C	Sumar	SALF	Lead
Sigma Dos/El Mundo	1–5 Jun 2026	995	?	34.2; 14/15	15.6; 6	19.0; 7/8	14.4; 5/6	5.3; 0/2	–	4.2; 0	–	–	15.2
Sigma Dos/El Mundo	27 May–5 Jun 2025	995	?	40.9; 15/16	16.7; 6/7	23.1; 8/9	10.7; 3/4	2.3; 0	–	–	–	–	17.8
NC Report/La Razón	16–31 May 2025	300	63.1	? 16	? 8	? 7	? 4	–	–	–	–	–	?
2024 EP election	9 Jun 2024	—N/a	50.7	42.8 (17)	–	31.0 (12)	9.9 (4)	2.7 (0)	0.9 (0)	–	3.2 (0)	5.7 (2)	11.8
2023 general election	23 Jul 2023	—N/a	69.9	42.1 (15)	–	33.3 (12)	14.1 (5)	(Note: Within Sumar.)	–	–	8.5 (3)	–	8.8
EM-Analytics/Electomanía	28 May–29 Jun 2023	1,000	?	37.1; 15	18.8; 7	22.1; 9	11.4; 4	4.0; 0	1.3; 0	–	–	–	15.0
2023 regional election	28 May 2023	—N/a	65.3	35.8; 15	20.8; 8	20.6; 8	11.1; 4	4.1; 0	2.3; 0	1.7; 0	–	–	15.0

=== Voting preferences ===
The table below lists raw, unweighted voting preferences.

Polling firm/Commissioner	Fieldwork date	Sample size	PP	PRC	PSOE	Vox	Podemos	Sumar	SALF	Question	X mark	Lead
CIS	7–31 Mar 2025	424	25.7	10.7	18.7	6.7	1.4	2.6	0.5	21.4	3.8	7.0
2024 EP election (Note: Does not include non-resident citizens.)	9 Jun 2024	—N/a	23.3	–	16.9	5.4	1.5	1.7	3.1	—N/a	45.1	6.4
2023 general election	23 Jul 2023	—N/a	31.3	–	24.8	10.5		6.3	–	—N/a	24.6	6.5
2023 regional election	28 May 2023	—N/a	24.7	14.4	14.2	7.7	2.8	–	–	—N/a	29.5	10.3

=== Preferred President ===
The table below lists opinion polling on leader preferences to become president of Cantabria.

Polling firm/Commissioner	Fieldwork date	Sample size						Other/ None/ Not care	Question	Lead
Polling firm/Commissioner	Fieldwork date	Sample size	Buruaga PP	Revilla PRC	Zuloaga PSOE	Casares PSOE	Díaz Vox	Other/ None/ Not care	Question	Lead
CIS (Note: Responses denoting a party's generic candidate are aggregated to that party's main candidate/leader at the time of the poll.)	7–31 Mar 2025	424	21.0	6.9	3.6	8.6	3.7	7.4	48.7	12.4
