= Third government of Miguel Ángel Revilla =

Third Revilla government
- Government of Cantabria

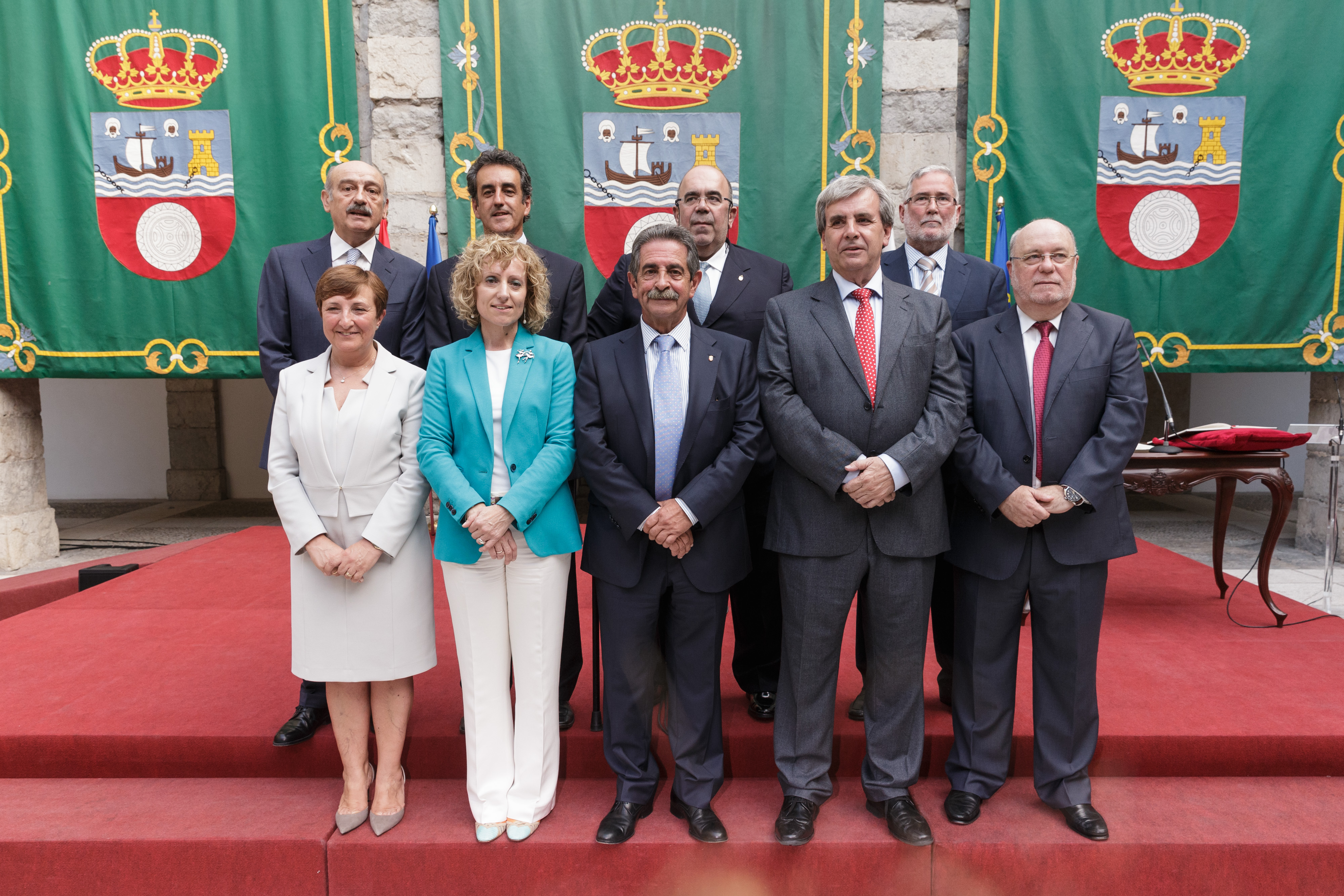
- The government in July 2015
- Date formed: 6 July 2015
- Date dissolved: 8 July 2019

People and organisations
- Head of government: Miguel Ángel Revilla
- Deputy head of government: Eva Díaz Tezanos
- No. of ministers: 9
- Member party: Regionalist Party of Cantabria; Socialist Party of Cantabria
- Status in legislature: Minority coalition
- Opposition party: People's Party of Cantabria
- Opposition leader: Eduardo Van den Eynde Ceruti

History
- Election: 2015 regional election
- Legislature term: 9th Parliament (2015–19)
- Predecessor: Diego
- Successor: Revilla IV

The third Revilla government was a regional government of Cantabria led by President Miguel Ángel Revilla. It was formed in July 2015 after the regional election and ended in July 2019 following the regional election.

== Government ==
Name	Portrait	Party	Office	Took office	Left office	^{Refs.}
Miguel Ángel Revilla		Regionalist Party of Cantabria	President	6 July 2015	29 June 2019	
Eva Díaz Tezanos		Socialist Party of Cantabria	Vice President	10 July 2015	8 July 2019	
Eva Díaz Tezanos		Socialist Party of Cantabria	Minister of Universities and Research, Environment and Social Services	10 July 2015	8 July 2019	
Rafael de la Sierra		Regionalist Party of Cantabria	Minister of the Presidency and Justice	10 July 2015	9 April 2019	
Francisco Fernández		Socialist Party of Cantabria	Minister of Education, Culture and Sports	20 September 2017	8 July 2019	
Paula Fernández Viaña		Regionalist Party of Cantabria	Minister of the Presidency and Justice	10 April 2019	8 July 2019	
José Luis Gochicoa		Regionalist Party of Cantabria	Minister of Public Works and Housing	22 March 2019	8 July 2019	
Francisco Martín		Independent	Minister of Innovation, Industry, Tourism and Commerce	10 July 2015	8 July 2019	
José María Mazón		Regionalist Party of Cantabria	Minister of Public Works and Housing	10 July 2015	21 March 2019	
Jesús Oria		Regionalist Party of Cantabria	Minister of Livestock, Fishing and Rural Development	10 July 2015	8 July 2019	
María Luisa Real		Socialist Party of Cantabria	Minister of Health	10 July 2015	8 July 2019	
Ramón Ruiz		Socialist Party of Cantabria	Minister of Education, Culture and Sports	10 July 2015	20 September 2017	
Juan José Sota		Socialist Party of Cantabria	Minister of Economy, Finance and Employment	10 July 2015	8 July 2019	
