= 2023 Cantabrian regional election =

Election in the Spanish region of Cantabria

- 28 May 2023

All 35 seats in the Parliament of Cantabria 18 seats needed for a majority
- Opinion polls
- Registered: 507,438 ▲1.3%
- Turnout: 331,413 (65.3%) ▼0.4 pp
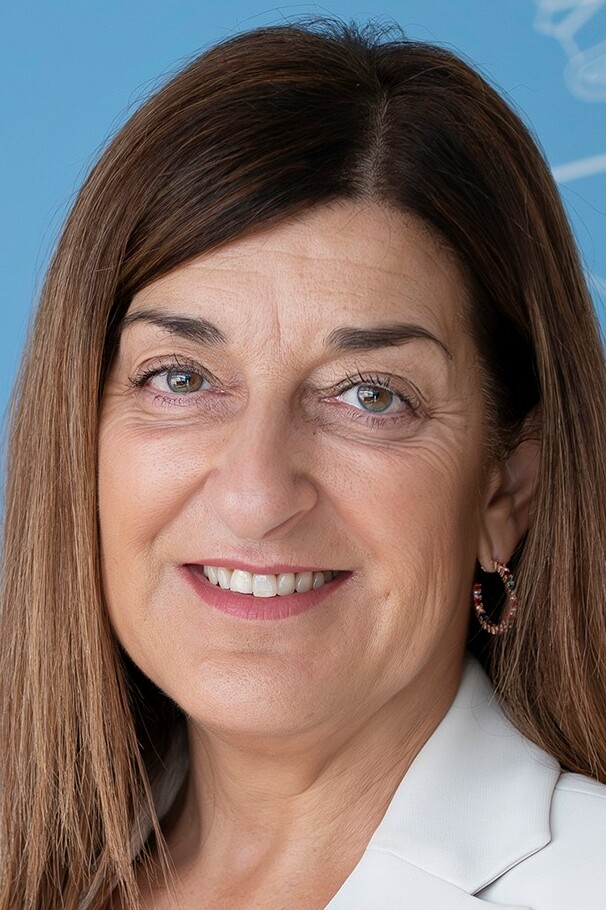

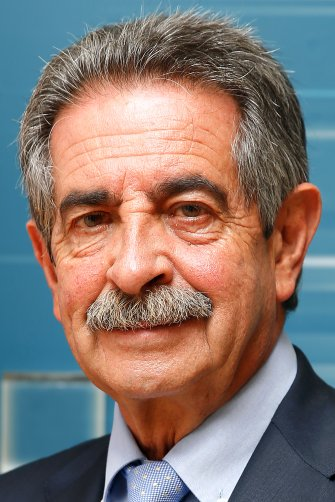

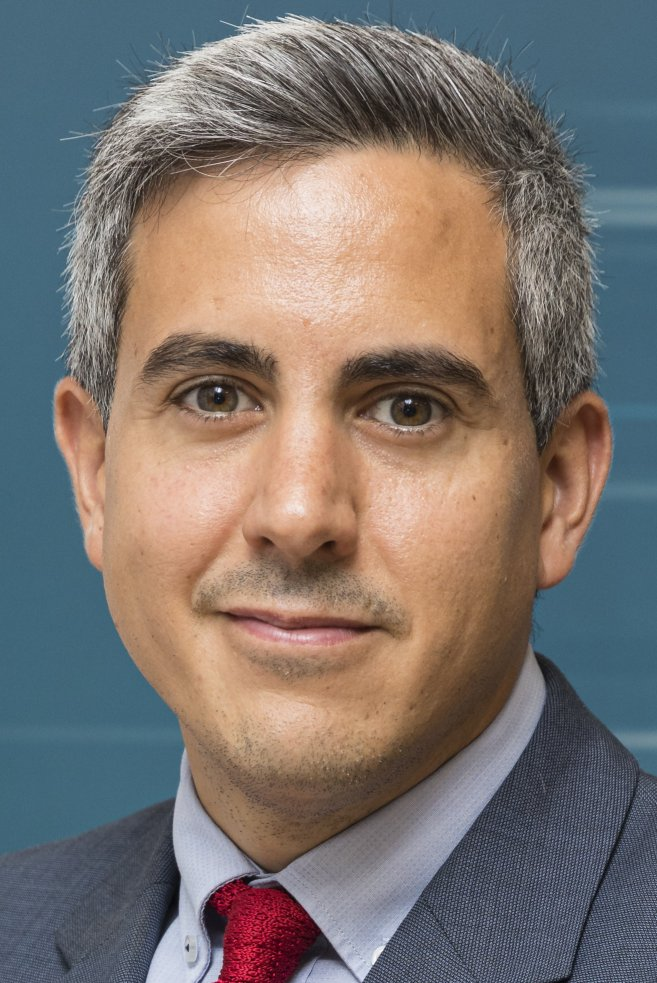

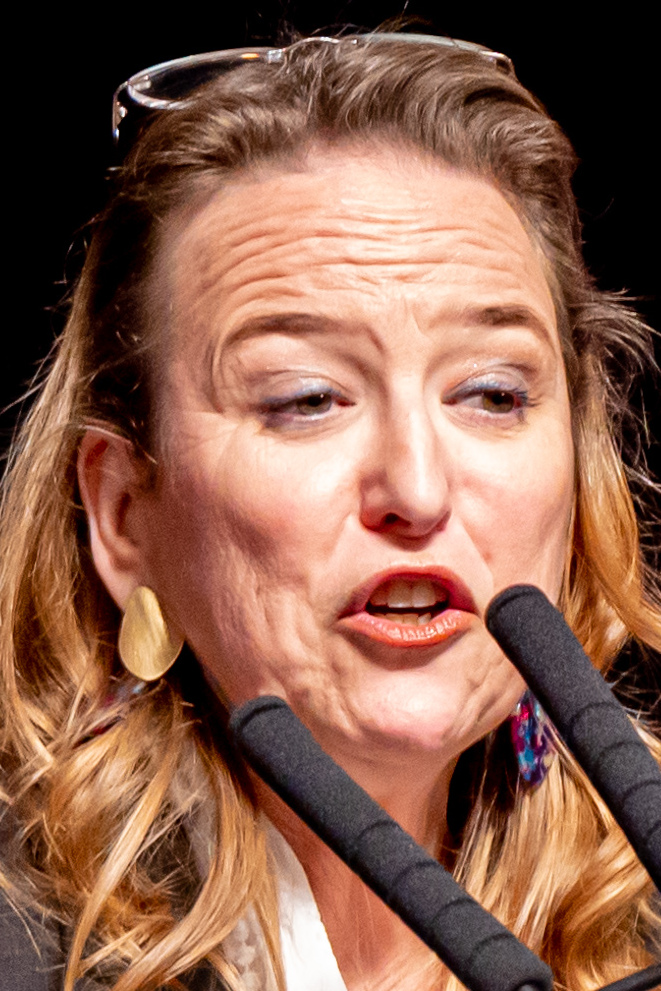

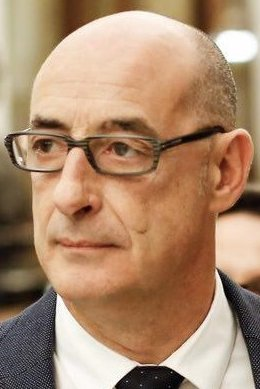
	First party	Second party	Third party
Leader	María José Sáenz de Buruaga	Miguel Ángel Revilla	Pablo Zuloaga
Party	PP	PRC	PSOE
Leader since	22 January 2019	1983	16 July 2017
Last election	9 seats, 24.0%	14 seats, 37.6%	7 seats, 17.6%
Seats won	15	8	8
Seat change	▲6	▼6	▲1
Popular vote	116,198	67,523	66,917
Percentage	35.8%	20.8%	20.6%
Swing	▲11.8 pp	▼16.8 pp	▲3.0 pp
	Fourth party	Fifth party
Leader	Leticia Díaz	Félix Álvarez
Party	Vox	CS
Leader since	17 January 2023	2 March 2019
Last election	2 seats, 5.1%	3 seats, 7.9%
Seats won	4	0
Seat change	▲2	▼3
Popular vote	35,982	7,527
Percentage	11.1%	2.3%
Swing	▲6.0 pp	▼5.6 pp
President before election
Miguel Ángel Revilla
PRC
Elected President
María José Sáenz de Buruaga
PP

The 2023 Cantabrian regional election was held on 28 May 2023 to elect the 11th Parliament of the autonomous community of Cantabria. All 35 seats in the Parliament were up for election. It was held concurrently with regional elections in eleven other autonomous communities and local elections all throughout Spain.

== Overview ==
=== Electoral system ===
The Parliament of Cantabria was the devolved, unicameral legislature of the autonomous community of Cantabria, having legislative power in regional matters as defined by the Spanish Constitution and the Cantabrian Statute of Autonomy, as well as the ability to vote confidence in or withdraw it from a regional president. Voting for the Parliament was on the basis of universal suffrage, which comprised all nationals over 18 years of age, registered in Cantabria and in full enjoyment of their political rights. Amendments to the electoral law in 2022 abolished the "begged" or expat vote system (Spanish: Voto rogado), under which Spaniards abroad were required to apply for voting before being permitted to vote. The expat vote system was attributed responsibility for a major decrease in the turnout of Spaniards abroad during the years it had been in force.

The 35 members of the Parliament of Cantabria were elected using the D'Hondt method and a closed list proportional representation, with an electoral threshold of five percent of valid votes—which included blank ballots—being applied regionally.

=== Election date ===
The term of the Parliament of Cantabria expired four years after the date of its previous election. Elections to the Parliament were fixed for the fourth Sunday of May every four years. The previous election was held on 26 May 2019, setting the election date for the Parliament on 28 May 2023.

The president had the prerogative to dissolve the Parliament of Cantabria and call a snap election, provided that no motion of no confidence was in process, no nationwide election was due and some time requirements were met: namely, that dissolution did not occur either during the first legislative session or within the legislature's last year ahead of its scheduled expiry, nor before one year had elapsed since a previous dissolution. In the event of an investiture process failing to elect a regional president within a two-month period from the first ballot, the Parliament was to be automatically dissolved and a fresh election called. Any snap election held as a result of these circumstances would not alter the period to the next ordinary election, with elected lawmakers serving the remainder of its original four-year term.

The election to the Parliament of Cantabria was officially triggered on 4 April 2023 after the publication of the election decree in the Official Gazette of Cantabria (BOC), scheduling for the chamber to convene on 22 June.

== Parliamentary composition ==
The table below shows the composition of the parliamentary groups in the Parliament at the time of dissolution.

Parliamentary composition in April 2023
Groups	Parties	Legislators	
Groups	Parties	Seats	Total
Regionalist Parliamentary Group	PRC	14	14
People's Parliamentary Group	PP	9	9
Socialist Parliamentary Group	PSOE	7	7
Citizens Parliamentary Group	CS	3	3
Mixed Parliamentary Group	Vox	2	2

== Parties and candidates ==
The electoral law allowed for parties and federations registered in the interior ministry, coalitions and groupings of electors to present lists of candidates. Parties and federations intending to form a coalition ahead of an election were required to inform the relevant Electoral Commission within ten days of the election call, whereas groupings of electors needed to secure the signature of at least one percent of the electorate in Cantabria, disallowing electors from signing for more than one list of candidates.

Below is a list of the main parties and electoral alliances which contested the election:

Candidacy	Parties and alliances	Candidate	Ideology	Previous result		Gov.	Ref.
Candidacy	Parties and alliances	Candidate	Ideology	Vote %	Seats	Gov.	Ref.
PRC	List: Regionalist Party of Cantabria (PRC)	Miguel Ángel Revilla	Regionalism; Centrism	37.6%	14	Yes	
PP	List: People's Party (PP)	María José Sáenz de Buruaga	Conservatism; Christian democracy	24.0%	9	No	
PSOE	List: Spanish Socialist Workers' Party (PSOE)	Pablo Zuloaga	Social democracy	17.6%	7	Yes	
CS	List: Citizens–Party of the Citizenry (CS)	Félix Álvarez	Liberalism	7.9%	3	No	
Vox	List: Vox (Vox)	Leticia Díaz	Right-wing populism Ultranationalism; National conservatism	5.1%	2	No	
Podemos–IU	List: We Can (Podemos); United Left (IU) – Communist Party of Cantabria (PCC) – The Dawn Marxist Organization (La Aurora (OM)) – Republican Left (IR)	Mónica Rodero	Left-wing populism Direct democracy Democratic socialism	5.0% (Note: Results for Podemos (3.1%, 0 seats) and IU+Equo (Marea Cántabra) (1.9%, 0 seats) in the 2019 election.)	0	No	

On 19 December 2019, Félix Álvarez resigned as leader of Citizens (CS) in Cantabria, citing "disagreements" with the party's leadership after a scandal broke out over the one-day hiring of Cs former leading candidate for the Congress of Deputies in the region, Rubén Gómez, a contract which Álvarez had publicly denied from having taken place.

== Opinion polls ==
The tables below list opinion polling results in reverse chronological order, showing the most recent first and using the dates when the survey fieldwork was done, as opposed to the date of publication. Where the fieldwork dates are unknown, the date of publication is given instead. The highest percentage figure in each polling survey is displayed with its background shaded in the leading party's colour. If a tie ensues, this is applied to the figures with the highest percentages. The "Lead" column on the right shows the percentage-point difference between the parties with the highest percentages in a poll.

=== Graphical summary ===
Local regression trend line of poll results from 26 May 2019 to 28 May 2023, with each line corresponding to a political party.

=== Voting intention estimates ===
The table below lists weighted voting intention estimates. Refusals are generally excluded from the party vote percentages, while question wording and the treatment of "don't know" responses and those not intending to vote may vary between polling organisations. When available, seat projections determined by the polling organisations are displayed below (or in place of) the percentages in a smaller font; 18 seats were required for an absolute majority in the Parliament of Cantabria.

Polling firm/Commissioner	Fieldwork date	Sample size	Turnout	PRC	PP	PSOE	CS	Vox	Podemos	IU	Unidas Podemos	EV	Lead
2023 regional election	28 May 2023	—N/a	65.3	20.8; 8	35.8; 15	20.6; 8	2.3; 0	11.1; 4	(Note: Within Unidas Podemos.)		4.1; 0	–	15.0
NC Report/La Razón	22 May 2023	?	?	25.8; 9/10	34.8; 13/14	19.9; 7/8	–	9.8; 3/4			4.8; 1/2	–	9.0
KeyData/Público	17 May 2023	?	70.0	24.1; 9	34.6; 13	20.6; 7	1.3; 0	11.1; 4			5.5; 2	–	10.5
Easiest	15–17 May 2023	400	?	26.1; 9/10	33.6; 12/13	22.9; 9	1.2; 0	11.1; 4			<5.0; 0	–	7.5
EM-Analytics/El Plural	11–17 May 2023	600	?	25.8; 10	33.5; 12	19.6; 7	1.4; 0	10.4; 4			7.1; 2	–	7.7
EM-Analytics/El Plural	4–10 May 2023	600	?	27.3; 10	32.5; 12	19.6; 7	1.4; 0	10.1; 4			7.0; 2	–	5.2
EM-Analytics/El Plural	26 Apr–3 May 2023	600	?	27.8; 11	32.4; 12	19.7; 7	1.4; 0	9.9; 3			6.6; 2	–	4.6
GAD3/ABC	26–27 Apr 2023	805	?	21.9; 8/9	33.3; 12/13	20.9; 8	1.0; 0	14.3; 5			5.2; 0/2	–	11.4
Metroscopia	25–27 Apr 2023	1,000	64.0	22.5; 8/9	37.1; 14/15	19.8; 7/8	–	9.4; 3/4			5.5; 2	–	14.6
CIS	10–26 Apr 2023	471	?	19.2; 6/7	31.8; 12/13	22.2; 8/9	2.3; 0	11.9; 4/5			8.6; 2/3	–	9.6
EM-Analytics/El Plural	19–25 Apr 2023	600	?	27.3; 10	32.6; 13	19.6; 7	1.4; 0	10.0; 3			6.9; 2	–	5.3
EM-Analytics/El Plural	12–18 Apr 2023	600	?	26.8; 10	31.5; 12	19.0; 7	1.4; 0	10.0; 4			7.1; 2	–	4.7
Simple Lógica/elDiario.es	11–18 Apr 2023	451	?	23.7; 9	34.0; 12/13	20.2; 7/8	2.4; 0	11.2; 4			5.8; 2	–	10.3
EM-Analytics/El Plural	5–11 Apr 2023	600	?	26.9; 10	30.5; 12	19.1; 7	1.6; 0	10.4; 4			7.5; 2	–	3.6
EM-Analytics/El Plural	27 Mar–4 Apr 2023	600	?	26.9; 10	31.5; 12	18.8; 7	1.6; 0	10.2; 4			7.0; 2	–	4.6
KeyData/Público	15 Mar 2023	?	70.0	29.0; 11	34.2; 13	18.3; 7	1.5; 0	8.4; 3			5.4; 1	–	5.2
NC Report/La Razón	27 Feb–3 Mar 2023	?	65.2	32.4; 13	36.0; 14	15.8; 6	1.5; 0	6.9; 2			4.7; 0	–	3.6
EM-Analytics/Electomanía	15 Jan–26 Feb 2023	243	?	27.3; 10	30.1; 12	18.9; 7	1.9; 0	10.9; 4			6.8; 2	–	2.8
Metroscopia	9–14 Feb 2023	1,500	?	23.4; 9	34.9; 13/14	20.6; 8	1.2; 0	9.5; 3/4			5.6; 0/2	–	11.5
Sigma Dos/El Mundo	3–9 Feb 2023	870	?	31.8; 12	33.4; 12	18.1; 6/7	1.8; 0	7.9; 2/3			5.4; 2	–	1.6
CIS (Note: Vote+Simpathy figures with undecided and/or abstentionists excluded.)	17 Nov–2 Dec 2022	196	?	14.7; 5/7	28.8; 10/14	28.6; 10/13	2.6; 0/1	11.0; 3/5			7.0; 0/3	–	0.2
EM-Analytics/Electomanía	30 Jun–13 Aug 2022	101	?	28.9; 11	28.9; 11	18.3; 7	2.0; 0	11.4; 4			7.5; 2	0.5; 0	Tie
Logos Lab/PRC	6 Mar 2022	800	?	31.5; 12	26.1; 10	19.5; 7	3.9; 0	10.0; 4			5.0; 2	–	5.4
EM-Analytics/Electomanía	15 Jan–27 Feb 2022	?	?	29.9; 11	27.6; 11	20.0; 7	2.3; 0	10.3; 4			7.1; 2	0.7; 0	2.3
EM-Analytics/Electomanía	1 Dec 2021	?	?	30.0; 12	27.5; 11	20.0; 7	2.0; 0	10.0; 3			7.0; 2	–	2.5
EM-Analytics/Electomanía	31 May 2021	800	?	28.2; 12	28.1; 11	20.7; 8	2.5; 0	10.5; 4	4.2; 0	1.8; 0	–	–	0.1
Metroscopia/PP	21–28 Apr 2021	1,500	60	26.1; 10	28.9; 12	21.7; 9	2.9; 0	9.8; 4	4.6; 0	1.5; 0	–	–	2.8
EM-Analytics/Electomanía	28 Feb 2021	?	?	32.5; 13	24.8; 10	20.0; 8	4.8; 0	10.2; 4	4.4; 0	1.4; 0	–	–	7.7
SyM Consulting	23–25 Oct 2020	916	68.7	31.0; 12/13	22.4; 9	16.6; 6/7	3.9; 0	17.9; 7	3.8; 0	1.8; 0	–	–	8.6
ElectoPanel/Electomanía	1 Apr–15 May 2020	?	?	32.5; 12	30.0; 12	18.6; 7	5.0; 2	5.9; 2	3.5; 0	1.4; 0	–	–	2.5
SyM Consulting	6–8 May 2020	807	67.6	37.9; 14/15	21.2; 8	20.4; 8	4.3; 0	6.8; 2/3	5.5; 2	1.5; 0	–	–	16.7
SW Demoscopia	30 Jan–7 Feb 2020	800	?	32.5; 13	22.4; 8	22.5; 9	3.9; 0	8.6; 3			7.1; 2	–	10.0
November 2019 general election	10 Nov 2019	—N/a	65.7	21.0 (8)	25.9 (10)	23.2 (9)	4.8 (0)	14.9 (5)			8.7 (3)	–	2.7
2019 regional election	26 May 2019	—N/a	65.7	37.6; 14	24.0; 9	17.6; 7	7.9; 3	5.1; 2	3.1; 0	1.9; 0	–	–	13.6

=== Voting preferences ===
The table below lists raw, unweighted voting preferences.

Polling firm/Commissioner	Fieldwork date	Sample size	PRC	PP	PSOE	CS	Vox	Podemos	IU	Unidas Podemos	Question	X mark	Lead
2023 regional election	28 May 2023	—N/a	14.4	24.7	14.2	1.6	7.7			2.8	—N/a	29.5	10.3
CIS	10–26 Apr 2023	471	13.2	23.1	16.5	1.2	9.9			5.8	24.4	1.9	6.6
CIS	17 Nov–2 Dec 2022	196	9.1	19.9	18.9	1.3	7.3			4.5	29.7	4.0	1.0
November 2019 general election	10 Nov 2019	—N/a	14.8	18.2	16.3	3.3	10.5			6.1	—N/a	29.2	1.9
2019 regional election	26 May 2019	—N/a	26.5	16.9	12.3	5.6	3.5	2.2	1.3	–	—N/a	29.0	9.6

== Results ==
← Summary of the 28 May 2023 Parliament of Cantabria election results →
Parties and alliances	Popular vote			Seats	
Parties and alliances	Votes	%	±pp	Total	+/−
People's Party (PP)	116,198	35.78	+11.74	15	+6
Regionalist Party of Cantabria (PRC)	67,523	20.79	−16.85	8	−6
Spanish Socialist Workers' Party (PSOE)	66,917	20.61	+3.00	8	+1
Vox (Vox)	35,982	11.08	+6.02	4	+2
We Can–United Left (Podemos–IU)^{1}	13,395	4.12	−0.92	0	±0
Citizens–Party of the Citizenry (CS)	7,527	2.32	−5.62	0	−3
Cantabrists (Cantabristas)	5,522	1.70	+1.21	0	±0
Animalist Party with the Environment (PACMA)^{2}	1,837	0.57	±0.00	0	±0
Greens Equo (Equo)	1,548	0.48	New	0	±0
Cantabria Wave (OlaCantabria)	1,125	0.35	+0.01	0	±0
Communist Party of the Workers of Spain (PCTE)	757	0.23	−0.01	0	±0
Different Cantabria (Cantabria Distinta)	588	0.18	New	0	±0
Blank ballots	5,809	1.75	+0.77		
Total	324,728			35	±0
Valid votes	324,728	97.98	−1.04		
Invalid votes	6,685	2.02	+1.04		
Votes cast / turnout	331,413	65.31	−0.40		
Abstentions	176,025	34.69	+0.40		
Registered voters	507,438				
Sources
Footnotes: ^{1} We Can–United Left results are compared to the combined totals of We Can and United Left+Equo (Cantabrian Tide) in the 2019 election.; ^{2} Animalist Party with the Environment results are compared to Animalist Party Against Mistreatment of Animals totals in the 2019 election.

Popular vote
PP	35.78%
PRC	20.79%
PSOE	20.61%
Vox	11.08%
Podemos–IU	4.12%
CS	2.32%
Cantabristas	1.70%
Others	1.81%
Blank ballots	1.75%

Seats
PP	42.86%
PRC	22.86%
PSOE	22.86%
Vox	11.43%

== Aftermath ==
Investiture; María José Sáenz de Buruaga (PP)
Ballot →	30 June 2023	3 July 2023
Required majority →	18 out of 35	Simple
Yes: • PP (15)	15 / 35	15 / 35
No: • PSOE (8); • Vox (4)	12 / 35	12 / 35
Abstentions: • PRC (8)	8 / 35	8 / 35
Absentees	0 / 35	0 / 35
