= Fourth government of Miguel Ángel Revilla =

4th government of Miguel Ángel Revilla
- Government of Cantabria
- 2019–2023
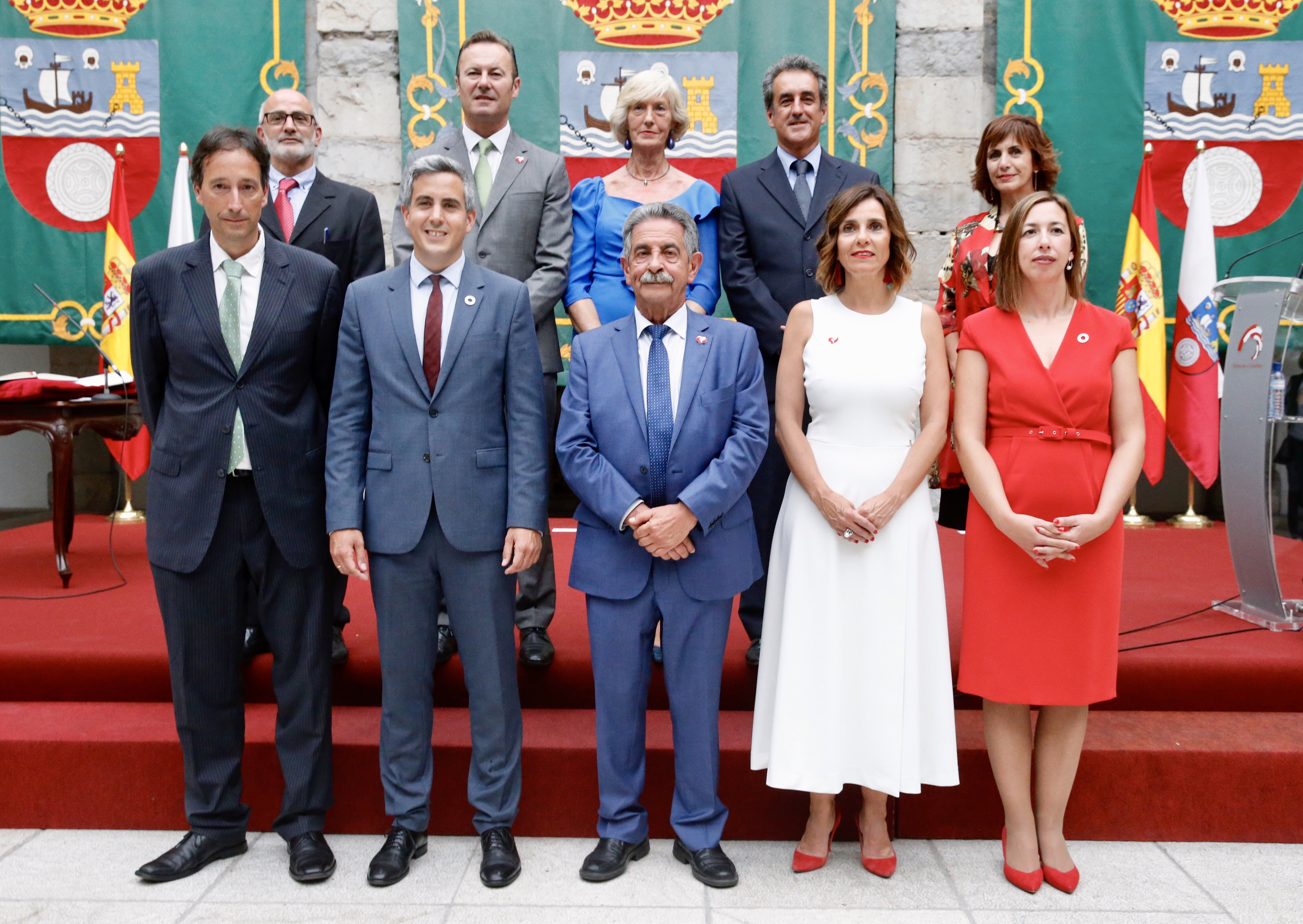
- The government in July 2019
- Date formed: 8 July 2019
- Date dissolved: 5 July 2023

People and organisations
- Monarch: Felipe VI
- President: Miguel Ángel Revilla
- Vice President: Pablo Zuloaga
- No. of ministers: 9 (Note: Does not include the President.)
- Total no. of members: 14
- Member party: PRC; PSOE
- Status in legislature: Majority coalition government
- Opposition party: PP
- Opposition leader: María José Sáenz de Buruaga

History
- Election: 2019 regional election
- Legislature term: 10th Parliament
- Budget: 2020, 2021, 2022
- Predecessor: Revilla III
- Successor: Buruaga

The second government of Miguel Ángel Revilla was the regional government of Cantabria during the 10th legislature (2019–2023).

It was formed on 8 July 2019 following the election of Revilla as President of Cantabria by the Parliament of Cantabria on 27 June and his swearing-in on 29 June, as a result of the Regionalist Party of Cantabria (PRC) emerging as the largest parliamentary force at the 2019 regional election. The cabinet comprised members of the PRC and the Spanish Socialist Workers' Party (PSOE), as well as a number of independents proposed by the former.

It succeeded the third Revilla government and it was dissolved on 5 July 2023, when the new president of Cantabria, María José Sáenz de Buruaga took office. It lasted a total of 1,458 days, or 3 years, 11 months and 27 days.

== Investiture ==
Investiture; Miguel Ángel Revilla (PRC)
Ballot →	27 June 2019
Required majority →	18 out of 35
Yes: • PRC (14); • PSOE (7)	21 / 35
No: • PP (9); • Cs (3)	12 / 35
Abstentions: • Vox (2)	2 / 35
Absentees	0 / 35

== Cabinet changes ==
Revilla's fourth government saw a number of cabinet changes during its tenure:

- On 15 January 2021, it was announced that Francisco Martín would be replaced in his post as regional minister of Innovation, Industry, Transport and Trade by Francisco Javier López Marcano, in order for the former to assume the presidency of the port of Santander. Martín's resignation was effective from 20 January, while López Marcano accessed the post on 25 January, which was reorganized to take Tourism competences from the Education and Vocational Training portfolio.
- On 11 March 2022, Health minister Miguel Rodríguez Gómez announced his resignation, over "personal" reasons. He was replaced in his post by Raúl Pesquera Cabezas on 16 March.
- On 3 March 2023, Public works ministers José Luis Gochicoa announced his resignation after a long-running corruption scandal into his department was discovered. He was replaced by the Presidency Minister, Paula Fernández Viaña.

== Council of Government ==
The Government of Cantabria is structured into the offices for the president, the vice president and nine ministries.

← Revilla IV Government → (8 July 2019 – present)
Portfolio	Name	Party	Took office	Left office	Ref.
President	Miguel Ángel Revilla	PRC	29 June 2019	5 July 2023	
Vice President; Minister of Universities, Equality, Culture and Sports	Pablo Zuloaga	PSOE	8 July 2019	10 July 2023	
Minister of the Presidency, Interior, Justice and Foreign Action	Paula Fernández Viaña	PRC	8 July 2019	10 July 2023	
Minister of Public Works, Territory Planning and Urbanism	José Luis Gochicoa	PRC	8 July 2019	10 March 2023	
Minister of Economy and Finance	María Sánchez Ruiz	PSOE	8 July 2019	12 April 2022	
Minister of Education, Vocational Training and Tourism	Marina Lombó	PRC	8 July 2019	25 January 2021	
Minister of Rural Development, Livestock, Fisheries, Food and Environment	Juan Guillermo Blanco Gómez	PRC	8 July 2019	10 July 2023	
Minister of Innovation, Industry, Transport and Trade	Francisco Martín	Independent (Note: Nominated by the PRC.)	8 July 2019	20 January 2021	
Minister of Health	Miguel Rodríguez Gómez	PSOE	8 July 2019	16 March 2022	
Minister of Employment and Social Policies	Ana Belén Álvarez	PSOE	8 July 2019	12 April 2022	
=== Changes January 2021 ===
Portfolio	Name	Party	Took office	Left office	Ref.
Minister of Education and Vocational Training	Marina Lombó	PRC	25 January 2021	10 July 2023	
Minister of Industry, Tourism, Innovation, Transport and Trade	Francisco Javier López Marcano	PRC	25 January 2021	10 July 2023	
=== Changes March 2022 ===
Portfolio	Name	Party	Took office	Left office	Ref.
Minister of Health	Raúl Pesquera Cabezas	PSOE	16 March 2022	10 July 2023	
=== Changes April 2022 ===
Portfolio	Name	Party	Took office	Left office	Ref.
Minister of Economy and Finance	Ana Belén Álvarez	PSOE	13 April 2022	10 July 2023	
Minister of Employment and Social Policies	Eugenia Gómez de Diego	PSOE	13 April 2022	10 July 2023	
=== Changes March 2023 ===
Portfolio	Name	Party	Took office	Left office	Ref.
Minister of Public Works, Territory Planning and Urbanism (acting)	Paula Fernández Viaña	PRC	10 March 2023	18 March 2023	
Minister of Public Works, Territory Planning and Urbanism	Jezabel Morán Lamadrid	Independent	18 March 2023	10 July 2023	

== Notes ==
Preceded by Revilla III	Government of Cantabria; 2019–present	Incumbent
