= 2019 Cantabrian regional election =

Election in the Spanish region of Cantabria

- 26 May 2019

All 35 seats in the Parliament of Cantabria 18 seats needed for a majority
- Opinion polls
- Registered: 500,925 ▲0.3%
- Turnout: 329,137 (65.7%) ▼0.5 pp
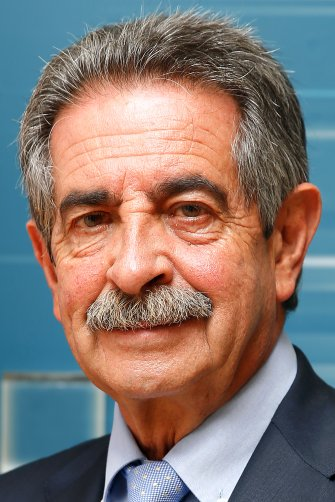

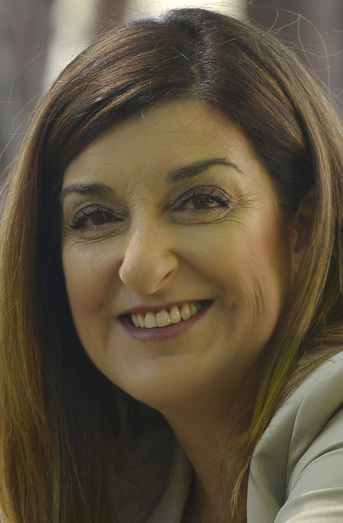

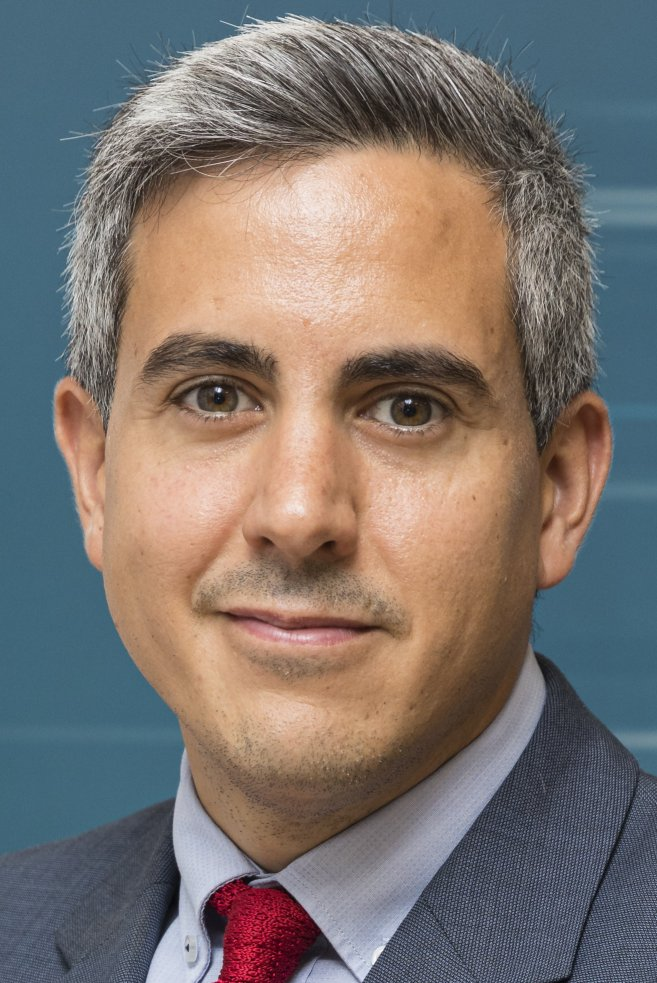

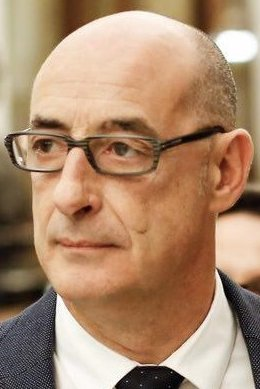

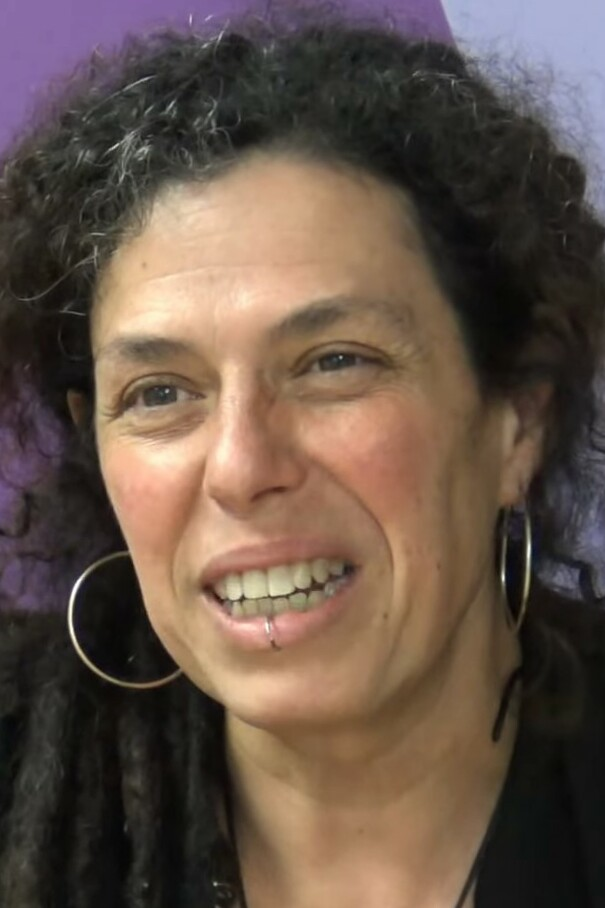
	First party	Second party	Third party
Leader	Miguel Ángel Revilla	María José Sáenz de Buruaga	Pablo Zuloaga
Party	PRC	PP	PSOE
Leader since	1983	22 January 2019	16 July 2017
Last election	12 seats, 29.9%	13 seats, 32.6%	5 seats, 14.0%
Seats won	14	9	7
Seat change	▲2	▼4	▲2
Popular vote	122,679	78,347	57,383
Percentage	37.6%	24.0%	17.6%
Swing	▲7.7 pp	▼8.6 pp	▲3.6 pp
	Fourth party	Fifth party	Sixth party
Leader	Félix Álvarez	Cristóbal Palacio	Mónica Rodero
Party	Cs	Vox	Podemos
Leader since	2 March 2019	20 March 2019	21 March 2019
Last election	2 seats, 6.9%	0 seats, 0.3%	3 seats, 8.9%
Seats won	3	2	0
Seat change	▲1	▲2	▼3
Popular vote	25,872	16,496	10,224
Percentage	7.9%	5.1%	3.1%
Swing	▲1.0 pp	▲4.8 pp	▼5.8 pp
President before election
Miguel Ángel Revilla
PRC
Elected President
Miguel Ángel Revilla
PRC

The 2019 Cantabrian regional election was held on 26 May 2019 to elect the 10th Parliament of the autonomous community of Cantabria. All 35 seats in the Parliament were up for election. It was held concurrently with regional elections in eleven other autonomous communities and local elections all throughout Spain, as well as the 2019 European Parliament election.

The election saw the Regionalist Party of Cantabria (PRC) of incumbent president Miguel Ángel Revilla become the most voted political force in a regional election for the first time, with 37.6% of the share and 14 out of the 35 seats at stake. Combined with an increase in the support for the Spanish Socialist Workers' Party (PSOE), the governing PRC–PSOE coalition went from a minority government to a majority one, with Revilla being re-elected for a fourth term in office. The People's Party (PP), with 24.0% of the vote and 9 seats, obtained its worst result since the 1991 election, whereas Podemos—which had seen an internal crisis ravage its parliamentary group in the region—fell below the five percent threshold and lost all of its seats. Both liberal Citizens and far-right Vox saw an increase in support, with both parties gaining seats and, in the latter's case, entering the chamber for the first time.

== Overview ==
=== Electoral system ===
The Parliament of Cantabria was the devolved, unicameral legislature of the autonomous community of Cantabria, having legislative power in regional matters as defined by the Spanish Constitution and the Cantabrian Statute of Autonomy, as well as the ability to vote confidence in or withdraw it from a regional president. Voting for the Parliament was on the basis of universal suffrage, which comprised all nationals over 18 years of age, registered in Cantabria and in full enjoyment of their political rights. Additionally, Cantabrians abroad were required to apply for voting before being permitted to vote, a system known as "begged" or expat vote (Spanish: Voto rogado).

The 35 members of the Parliament of Cantabria were elected using the D'Hondt method and a closed list proportional representation, with an electoral threshold of five percent of valid votes—which included blank ballots—being applied regionally.

=== Election date ===
The term of the Parliament of Cantabria expired four years after the date of its previous election. Elections to the Parliament were fixed for the fourth Sunday of May every four years. The previous election was held on 24 May 2015, setting the election date for the Parliament on 26 May 2019.

The president had the prerogative to dissolve the Parliament of Cantabria and call a snap election, provided that no motion of no confidence was in process, no nationwide election was due and some time requirements were met: namely, that dissolution did not occur either during the first legislative session or within the legislature's last year ahead of its scheduled expiry, nor before one year had elapsed since a previous dissolution. In the event of an investiture process failing to elect a regional president within a two-month period from the first ballot, the Parliament was to be automatically dissolved and a fresh election called. Any snap election held as a result of these circumstances would not alter the period to the next ordinary election, with elected lawmakers serving the remainder of its original four-year term.

The election to the Parliament of Cantabria was officially triggered on 2 April 2019 after the publication of the election decree in the Official Gazette of Cantabria (BOC), scheduling for the chamber to convene on 20 June.

== Parliamentary composition ==
The table below shows the composition of the parliamentary groups in the Parliament at the time of dissolution.

Parliamentary composition in April 2019
Groups	Parties	Legislators	
Groups	Parties	Seats	Total
People's Parliamentary Group	PP	13	13
Regionalist Parliamentary Group	PRC	12	12
Socialist Parliamentary Group	PSOE	5	5
Mixed Parliamentary Group	Cs	1	4
Mixed Parliamentary Group	OlaCantabria	1 (Note: Juan Ramón Carrancio, former Cs legislator.)	4
Mixed Parliamentary Group	INDEP	2 (Note: José Ramón Blanco and Alberto Bolado, former Podemos legislators.)	4
Non-Inscrits	Podemos	1 (Note: Verónica Ordóñez.)	1

== Parties and candidates ==
The electoral law allowed for parties and federations registered in the interior ministry, coalitions and groupings of electors to present lists of candidates. Parties and federations intending to form a coalition ahead of an election were required to inform the relevant Electoral Commission within ten days of the election call, whereas groupings of electors needed to secure the signature of at least one percent of the electorate in Cantabria, disallowing electors from signing for more than one list of candidates.

Below is a list of the main parties and electoral alliances which contested the election:

Candidacy	Parties and alliances	Candidate	Ideology	Previous result		Gov.	Ref.
Candidacy	Parties and alliances	Candidate	Ideology	Vote %	Seats	Gov.	Ref.
PP	List: People's Party (PP)	María José Sáenz de Buruaga	Conservatism; Christian democracy	32.6%	13	No	
PRC	List: Regionalist Party of Cantabria (PRC)	Miguel Ángel Revilla	Regionalism; Centrism	29.9%	12	Yes	
PSOE	List: Spanish Socialist Workers' Party (PSOE)	Pablo Zuloaga	Social democracy	14.0%	5	Yes	
Podemos	List: We Can (Podemos)	Mónica Rodero	Left-wing populism Direct democracy Democratic socialism	8.9%	3	No	
Cs	List: Citizens–Party of the Citizenry (Cs)	Félix Álvarez	Liberalism	6.9%	2	No	
Vox	List: Vox (Vox)	Cristóbal Palacio	Right-wing populism Ultranationalism; National conservatism	0.3%	0	No	

== Opinion polls ==
The table below lists voting intention estimates in reverse chronological order, showing the most recent first and using the dates when the survey fieldwork was done, as opposed to the date of publication. Where the fieldwork dates are unknown, the date of publication is given instead. The highest percentage figure in each polling survey is displayed with its background shaded in the leading party's colour. If a tie ensues, this is applied to the figures with the highest percentages. The "Lead" column on the right shows the percentage-point difference between the parties with the highest percentages in a poll. When available, seat projections determined by the polling organisations are displayed below (or in place of) the percentages in a smaller font; 18 seats were required for an absolute majority in the Parliament of Cantabria.

Color key:

Poll conducted after legal ban on opinion polls

Polling firm/Commissioner	Fieldwork date	Sample size	Turnout	PP	PRC	PSOE	Podemos	Cs	IU	Vox	Unidas Podemos	Lead
2019 regional election	26 May 2019	—N/a	65.7	24.0; 9	37.6; 14	17.6; 7	3.1; 0	7.9; 3	1.9; 0	5.1; 2	–	13.6
ElectoPanel/Electomanía	22–23 May 2019	?	?	18.9; 7	31.2; 12	17.5; 7	7.2; 2	13.2; 5	2.2; 0	7.3; 2	–	12.3
ElectoPanel/Electomanía	21–22 May 2019	?	?	19.1; 7	31.3; 12	17.7; 7	6.9; 2	13.0; 5	2.2; 0	7.2; 2	–	12.2
ElectoPanel/Electomanía	20–21 May 2019	?	?	19.0; 7	31.3; 12	17.6; 7	6.9; 2	12.6; 5	2.1; 0	7.5; 2	–	12.3
ElectoPanel/Electomanía	19–20 May 2019	?	?	18.9; 7	31.2; 12	17.5; 7	7.0; 2	12.8; 5	1.9; 0	7.3; 2	–	12.3
NC Report/La Razón	19 May 2019	?	?	20.1; 7	? 13	17.6; 6	? 3	? 4	? 0	? 2	–	?
ElectoPanel/Electomanía	16–19 May 2019	?	?	18.5; 7	31.0; 12	17.6; 6	7.0; 2	12.9; 5	2.0; 0	7.4; 3	–	12.5
ElectoPanel/Electomanía	13–16 May 2019	?	?	18.5; 7	30.1; 12	17.3; 6	7.0; 2	13.3; 5	2.0; 0	7.7; 3	–	11.6
ElectoPanel/Electomanía	10–13 May 2019	?	?	17.8; 7	29.4; 11	16.5; 6	7.4; 3	14.1; 5	2.4; 0	8.7; 3	–	11.6
ElectoPanel/Electomanía	7–10 May 2019	?	?	16.9; 7	28.8; 11	16.8; 6	6.8; 2	15.0; 6	2.3; 0	9.3; 3	–	11.9
Sigma Dos/El Diario Montañés	6–8 May 2019	700	?	22.0; 8/9	33.4; 12/13	18.0; 7	6.8; 2	8.6; 3	–	6.3; 2	–	11.4
ElectoPanel/Electomanía	4–7 May 2019	?	?	16.0; 6	27.7; 11	16.1; 6	6.8; 2	15.8; 6	2.4; 0	9.4; 4	–	11.6
ElectoPanel/Electomanía	29 Apr–4 May 2019	?	?	16.3; 6	28.1; 12	15.3; 6	7.0; 2	15.5; 6	2.1; 0	9.0; 3	–	11.8
April 2019 general election	28 Apr 2019	—N/a	72.4	21.7 (8)	14.6 (5)	25.2 (9)	(Note: Within Unidas Podemos.)	15.1 (5)		11.2 (4)	10.2 (4)	3.5
CIS	21 Mar–23 Apr 2019	390	?	20.7; 8/10	33.8; 12/13	18.1; 5/7	7.9; 2/3	8.6; 2/3	3.2; 0	5.3; 1/2	–	13.1
ElectoPanel/Electomanía	31 Mar–7 Apr 2019	?	?	19.0; 8	25.0; 10	18.3; 7	6.0; 2	11.4; 4	2.2; 0	11.3; 4	–	6.0
ElectoPanel/Electomanía	24–31 Mar 2019	?	?	18.1; 7	25.9; 10	17.9; 7		11.6; 4		11.2; 4	7.9; 3	7.8
ElectoPanel/Electomanía	17–24 Mar 2019	?	?	18.3; 7	25.8; 10	18.4; 7		11.3; 4		11.0; 4	7.6; 3	7.4
ElectoPanel/Electomanía	10–17 Mar 2019	?	?	18.1; 7	25.5; 10	17.4; 6		10.1; 4		13.1; 5	7.5; 3	7.4
ElectoPanel/Electomanía	3–10 Mar 2019	?	?	17.7; 7	25.7; 10	17.1; 6		10.6; 4		13.0; 5	7.6; 3	8.0
ElectoPanel/Electomanía	22 Feb–3 Mar 2019	?	?	17.6; 7	25.7; 10	17.0; 6		10.7; 4		13.0; 5	7.7; 3	8.1
Sigma Dos/PP	2 Dec 2018	1,200	?	29.1; 10/11	26.5; 10	17.0; 6/7		14.1; 5		–	9.3; 3	2.6
SyM Consulting	4–5 Jun 2018	781	65.0	20.9; 8	35.2; 14/15	22.2; 8/9	4.2; 0	10.8; 4	1.8; 0	–	–	13.0
SyM Consulting	2–4 Mar 2018	724	67.2	30.5; 11/12	27.8; 10/11	14.9; 5	5.1; 2	15.5; 6	1.2; 0	–	–	2.7
2016 general election	26 Jun 2016	—N/a	68.5	41.5 (15)	–	23.5 (9)		14.4 (5)		0.2 (0)	17.7 (6)	18.0
2015 general election	20 Dec 2015	—N/a	71.0	36.9 (14)	–	22.4 (8)	17.9 (7)	15.2 (6)	4.4 (0)	0.3 (0)	–	14.5
2015 regional election	24 May 2015	—N/a	66.2	32.6; 13	29.9; 12	14.0; 5	8.9; 3	6.9; 2	2.5; 0	0.3; 0	–	2.7

== Results ==
← Summary of the 26 May 2019 Parliament of Cantabria election results →
Parties and alliances	Popular vote			Seats	
Parties and alliances	Votes	%	±pp	Total	+/−
Regionalist Party of Cantabria (PRC)	122,679	37.64	+7.75	14	+2
People's Party (PP)	78,347	24.04	−8.54	9	−4
Spanish Socialist Workers' Party (PSOE)	57,383	17.61	+3.57	7	+2
Citizens–Party of the Citizenry (Cs)	25,872	7.94	+1.00	3	+1
Vox (Vox)	16,496	5.06	+4.72	2	+2
We Can (Podemos)	10,224	3.14	−5.75	0	−3
United Left+Equo (Cantabrian Tide) (IU+Equo (Marea Cántabra))^{1}	6,204	1.90	−1.13	0	±0
Animalist Party Against Mistreatment of Animals (PACMA)	1,854	0.57	−0.03	0	±0
Cantabrists (Cantabristas)	1,584	0.49	New	0	±0
Cantabria Wave (OlaCantabria)	1,119	0.34	New	0	±0
Communist Party of the Workers of Spain (PCTE)	774	0.24	New	0	±0
New People's Left (NIP)	187	0.06	New	0	±0
Blank ballots	3,180	0.98	−0.57		
Total	325,903			35	±0
Valid votes	325,903	99.02	+0.75		
Invalid votes	3,234	0.98	−0.75		
Votes cast / turnout	329,137	65.71	−0.52		
Abstentions	171,788	34.29	+0.52		
Registered voters	500,925				
Sources
Footnotes: ^{1} United Left+Equo (Cantabrian Tide) results are compared to the combined totals of United Left and Equo in the 2015 election.

Popular vote
PRC	37.64%
PP	24.04%
PSOE	17.61%
Cs	7.94%
Vox	5.06%
Podemos	3.14%
IU+Equo	1.90%
Others	1.69%
Blank ballots	0.98%

Seats
PRC	40.00%
PP	25.71%
PSOE	20.00%
Cs	8.57%
Vox	5.71%

== Aftermath ==
Investiture; Miguel Ángel Revilla (PRC)
Ballot →	27 June 2019
Required majority →	18 out of 35
Yes: • PRC (14); • PSOE (7)	21 / 35
No: • PP (9); • Cs (3)	12 / 35
Abstentions: • Vox (2)	2 / 35
Absentees	0 / 35
