= Leticia Díaz =

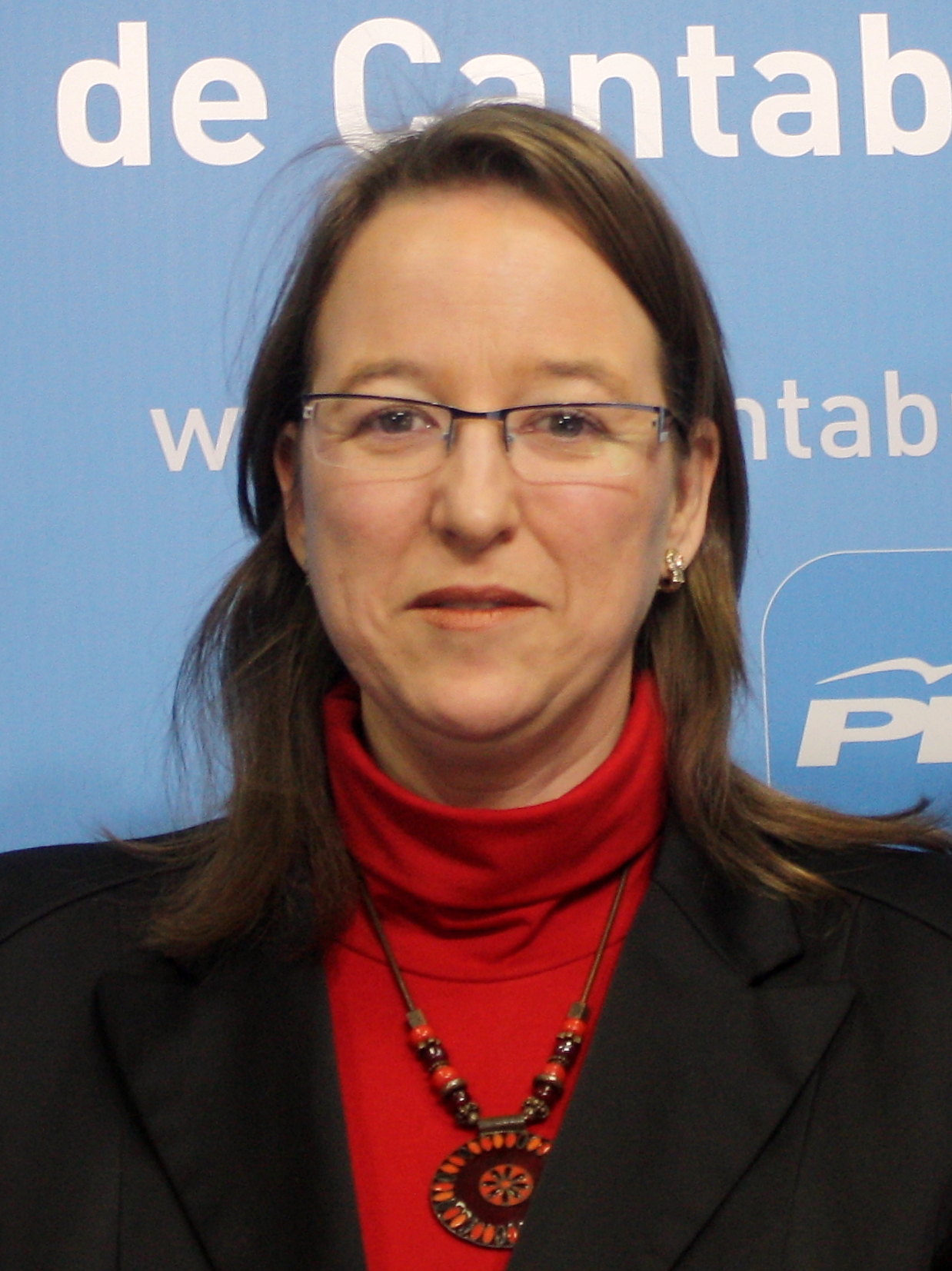
Díaz in 2011

Leticia Díaz Rodríguez (born 1969) is a Spanish politician. As a member of the People's Party (PP), she was a member of the Senate of Spain from 2010 to 2011, and a minister of the Government of Cantabria from 2011 to 2015. In 2023, she joined Vox, and led the party in that year's regional election, in which she was elected to the Parliament of Cantabria.

== Biography ==
Born in Infiesto in Asturias, Díaz is the mother of three children. She graduated with a law degree and became a civil servant, and was the secretary general of the Ministry of Health, Consumer Affairs and Social Services of the Government of Cantabria between 1999 and 2003.

Díaz was a supplementary name on the list of the People's Party (PP) in the Cantabria constituency of the Senate of Spain in the 2008 general election. In April 2010, party treasurer Luis Bárcenas resigned due to his implication in the Gürtel case, and Díaz was sworn in as his replacement. Fourteen months later, she was named minister of the presidency and justice in the government of President of Cantabria Ignacio Diego.

In January 2023, Vox announced Díaz as its lead candidate for the Cantabrian regional election in May, with her predecessor Cristóbal Palacio dropping to second on the list. The party increased from two to four seats, and from fifth place to fourth. While the results of other regional elections that year led to PP-Vox coalition governments, negotiations with the 15 PP deputies in the Parliament of Cantabria were unsuccessful in building a majority in the 35-seat legislature; María José Sáenz de Buruaga of the PP was elected regional president in a minority government due to the abstention of the eight deputies from the Regionalist Party of Cantabria (PRC).

The four Vox deputies in the Parliament of Cantabria split into two cliques – Díaz and Natividad Pérez on one side and Palacio and Armando Blanco on the other – but did not formally split as they required at least three members to get the benefits of a parliamentary group. Palacio and Blanco made a police report of espionage, and Díaz was suspended from party membership for six months from September 2024 due to an accusation of workplace harassment from an employee.
