= Workers' Communist Party of Spain =

Workers' Communist Party of Spain Partido Comunista de los Trabajadores de España
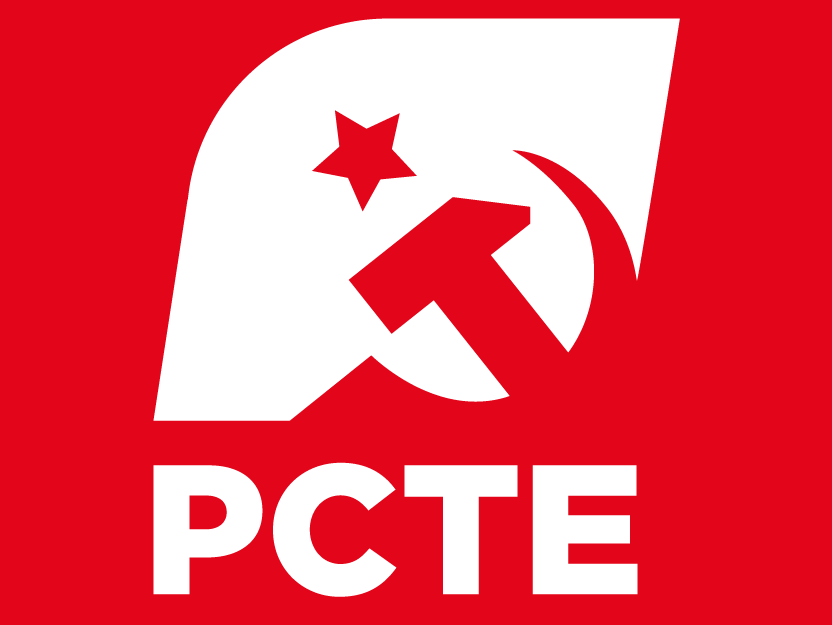
- General Secretary: Ástor García
- Founded: 3 March 2019
- Split from: PCPE
- Headquarters: C. de Peñas Largas 10, Madrid, Spain
- Newspaper: Nuevo Rumbo
- Youth wing: Collectives of Communist Youth
- Ideology: Communism; Marxism-Leninism
- Political position: Far-left
- European affiliation: INITIATIVE (2019–2023); ECA (2023–)
- International affiliation: IMCWP
- Colours: Red
- Congress of Deputies: 0 / 350
- Senate: 0 / 266
- European Parliament: 0 / 59
- Local Government (2023-2027): 1 / 67,515

Website
- www.pcte.es

The Workers' Communist Party of Spain (Spanish: Partido Comunista de los Trabajadores de España, abbreviated PCTE) is a Marxist–Leninist party in Spain. The PCTE was founded on 3 March 2019 as the result of a split in the Communist Party of the Peoples of Spain (PCPE). The youth organization of the PCTE is called the Collectives of Communist Youth.

== History ==
The PCTE contested both the April 2019 Spanish general election (14,189 votes, 0.05%) and the election for the European Parliament (19,081, 0.09%). On the same day of the European parliament election, the PCTE competed in five regional elections and in sixteen municipalities. The party won in total 4,368 votes and two seats in the former mining municipality of Degaña in southwestern Asturias. It also supported the local list Asamblea Ciudadana Por Torrelavega (ACPT), which also won two seats.

At the November 2019 election, the PCTE is fielding candidates in 37 provinces, compared to the 27 provinces the party contested at the previous election.

At the 2023 Spanish regional and local elections, the party has fielded candidates in four autonomies and twenty-one municipalities. Despite winning more votes than in 2019 (7,186 votes overall), the party lost both seats in Degaña. The party only obtained one seat in the Mallorcan town of Bunyola through the broad leftist coalition "Esquerra Oberta de Bunyola".

== Election results ==
Cortes Generales
Year	Votes	%
April 2019	14,189	0.05%
November 2019	13,828	0.06%
July 2023	17,918	0.07%

European elections
Year	Votes	%
2019	19,081	0.09%
2024	15,281	0.09%

Spanish regional elections
Autonomy	Year	Votes	%
Aragon	2019	559	0.08%
Asturias	2019	1,082	0.21%
Cantabria	2019	774	0.15%
Castile and León	2019	1,147	0.08%
Basque Country	2020	546	0.06%
Galicia	2020	885	0.07%
Catalonia	2021	4,504	0.16%
Community of Madrid	2021	1,653	0.05%
Castile and León	2022	1.344	0.11%
Asturias	2023	1,314	0.25%
Aragon	2023	843	0.13%
Community of Madrid	2023	4,765	0.14%
Cantabria	2023	733	0.23%
Basque Country	2024	660	0.06%
Castile and León	2026	1,688	0.14%

Local Elections 2019
Municipality	Autonomy	Votes	%	Seats
Avilés	Asturias	236	0.62%	0
Córdoba	Andalusia	380	0.26%	0
Degaña	Asturias	147	24.54%	2
Gijon	Asturias	289	0.21%	0
Langreo	Asturias	106	0.56%	0
León	Castile and León	119	0.18%	0
Madrid	Community of Madrid	791	0.05%	0
Málaga	Andalusia	188	0.08%	0
Mieres	Asturias	74	0.38%	0
Oviedo	Asturias	163	0.15%	0
Salamanca	Castile and León	233	0.31%	0
San Juan de Aznalfarache	Andalusia	110	1.32%	0
Valladolid	Castile and León	229	0.14%	0
Vigo	Galicia	267	0.18%	0
Zaragoza	Aragon	229	0.07%	0

Local Elections 2023
Municipality	Autonomy	Votes	%	Seats
Alcañiz	Aragon	23	0.30%	0
Avilés	Asturias	343	0.90%	0
Barcelona	Catalonia	727	0.10%	0
Bilbao	Basque Country	315	0.21%	0
Burgos	Castille and León	239	0.28%	0
Degaña	Asturias	42	8.10%	0
Ermua	Basque Country	186	2.44%	0
Gijón	Asturias	454	0.32%	0
León	Castille and León	210	0.36%	0
Madrid	Community of Madrid	1,192	0.07%	0
Mieres	Asturias	123	0.66%	0
Oviedo	Asturias	309	0.28%	0
Salamanca	Castille and León	145	0.21%	0
San Juan de Aznalfarache	Andalusia	321	3.60%	0
Santander	Cantabria	176	0.20%	0
Sevilla	Andalusia	557	0.17%	0
Tarragona	Catalonia	179	0.37%	0
Terrassa	Catalonia	212	0.26%	0
Valladolid	Castille and León	253	0.15%	0
Vigo	Galicia	481	0.35%	0
Zaragoza	Aragon	699	0.21%	0
Bunyola	Balearic Islands	916	24.69%	1 (Inside Esquerra Oberta de Bunyola coalition)
