= Eva Díaz Tezanos =

Spanish politician (born 1964)

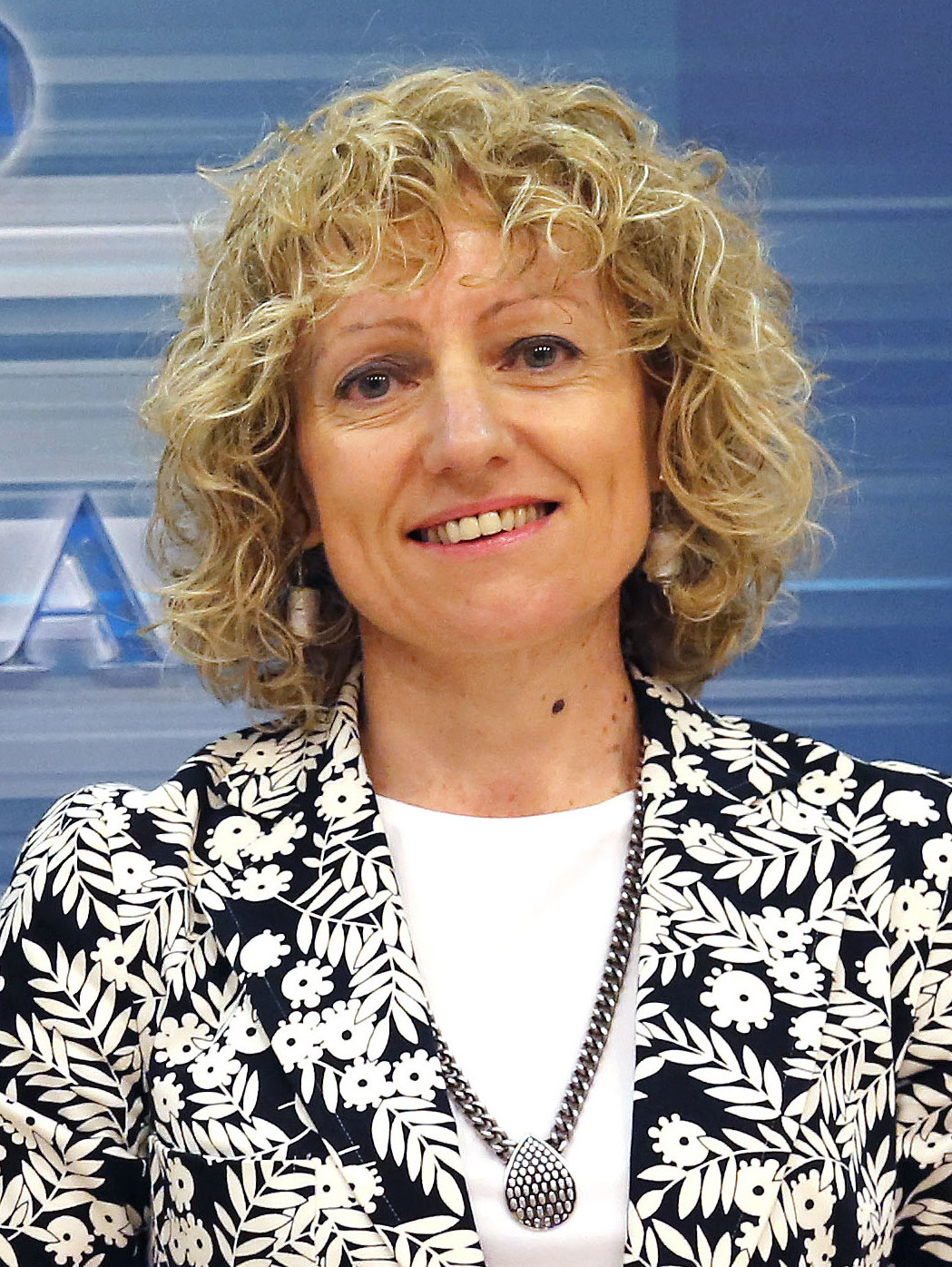

Vice President of Cantabria
- In office 10 July 2015 – 8 July 2019
- President: Miguel Ángel Revilla
- Preceded by: María José Sáenz de Buruaga
- Succeeded by: Pablo Zuloaga

Regional Minister of Universities, Research, Environment and Social Policy of Cantabria
- In office 10 July 2015 – 8 July 2019
- President: Miguel Ángel Revilla
- Preceded by: María José Sáenz de Buruaga (Health and Social Services); Miguel Ángel Serna (Universities); Francisco Javier Fernández González (Environment, Territorial Planning and Urbanism)
- Succeeded by: Pablo Zuloaga (Universities, Equality, Culture and Sport); Ana Belén Álvarez Fernández (Social Policy); Juan Guillermo Blanco Gómez (Environment)

Secretary General of the Socialist Party of Cantabria
- In office 31 March 2012 – 16 July 2017
- Preceded by: Dolores Gorostiaga
- Succeeded by: Pablo Zuloaga

Personal details
- Born: Rosa Eva Díaz Tezanos; 12 June 1964 (age 61) Puente San Miguel, Spain
- Party: PSOE

Rosa Eva Díaz Tezanos (born 12 June 1964) is a Spanish politician from the Spanish Socialist Workers' Party who served as Vice President of Cantabria and Regional Minister of Universities, Research, Environment and Social Policy from 2015 to 2019.
