= Dolores Gorostiaga =

Spanish politician

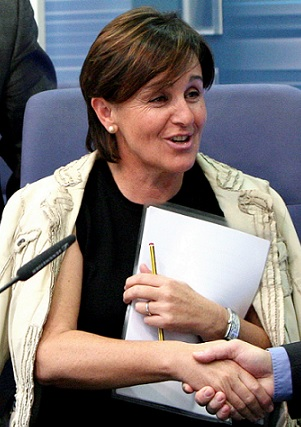

President of the Parliament of Cantabria
- In office 18 June 2015 – 19 June 2019
- Preceded by: José Antonio Cagigas
- Succeeded by: Joaquín Gómez Gómez

Secretary General of the Socialist Party of Cantabria
- In office 16 December 2000 – 31 March 2012
- Preceded by: Jaime Blanco García
- Succeeded by: Eva Díaz Tezanos

Vice President of Cantabria
- In office 27 June 2003 – 28 June 2011
- President: Miguel Ángel Revilla
- Preceded by: Miguel Ángel Revilla
- Succeeded by: María José Sáenz de Buruaga

Regional Minister of Employment and Social Welfare of Cantabria
- In office 2 July 2007 – 28 June 2011
- President: Miguel Ángel Revilla
- Preceded by: Miguel Ángel Pesquera González (Industry, Labour and Technological Development); Rosario Quintana Pantaleón (Health and Social Services)
- Succeeded by: María José Sáenz de Buruaga (Health and Social Services); Cristina Mazas Pérez-Oleaga (Economy, Finance and Employment)

Regional Minister of Institutional Relations and European Affairs of Cantabria
- In office 27 June 2003 – 2 July 2007
- President: Miguel Ángel Revilla
- Preceded by: Office created
- Succeeded by: Office abolished

Personal details
- Born: María Dolores Gorostiaga Saiz; 24 February 1957 (age 69) Piélagos, Cantabria, Spain
- Party: PSOE

María Dolores Gorostiaga Saiz (born 24 February 1957) is a Spanish politician from the Spanish Socialist Workers' Party who served as Vice President of Cantabria from 2003 and 2011, Regional Minister of Institutional Relations and European Affairs from 2003 to 2007 and Regional Minister of Employment and Social Welfare from 2007 to 2011, as well as President of the Parliament of Cantabria from 2015 to 2019.
