= PSC-PSOE =

In Spain, the Spanish Socialist Workers' Party (PSOE) has three local chapters that use the initialism PSC-PSOE. PSC-PSOE is the Spanish- (Note: Partido Socialista de Canarias, Partido Socialista de Cantabria) and Catalan-language (Note: Partit dels Socialistes de Catalunya) initialism for the name of those chapters in these autonomous communities:

- Socialist Party of the Canaries, the PSOE regional federation in the region of the Canary Islands
- Socialist Party of Cantabria, the PSOE regional federation in the region of Cantabria
- Socialists' Party of Catalonia, the PSOE regional federation in the region of Catalonia
