= Ignacio Diego =

Spanish politician

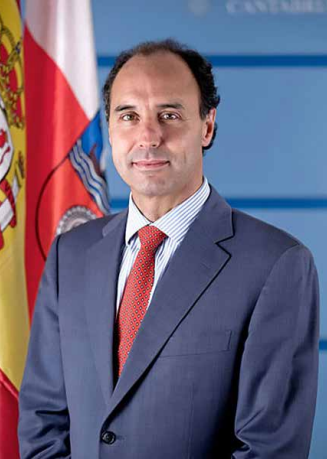

8th President of Cantabria
- In office 23 June 2011 – 3 July 2015
- Monarch: Juan Carlos I
- Vice President: María José Sáenz de Buruaga
- Preceded by: Miguel Ángel Revilla
- Succeeded by: Miguel Ángel Revilla

Personal details
- Born: 18 May 1960 (age 65) Castro Urdiales, Cantabria, Spain
- Party: PP
- Spouse: María Luisa Castañeda
- Children: Three

Juan Ignacio Diego Palacios (born 18 May 1960, in Castro Urdiales, Cantabria) is a Spanish politician and member of the Partido Popular. He has served as the President of Cantabria, one of Spain's seventeen autonomous regions, from 2011 to 2015. Diego's PP political party obtained an absolute majority in the Parliament of Cantabria in the regional elections held on 22 May 2011.

Ignacio Diego was elected President of the Atlantic Arc Commission, a multi-national association of Atlantic European regions consisting of 26 political regions from France, Ireland, Portugal, Spain, and the United Kingdom, at a conference held from 31 May to 1 June 2012. Diego (and Cantabria) served a two-year term as President of the AAC from 2012 to 2014. His presidency succeeded that of the French region of Lower Normandy, which had held it from 2008 to 2012.
