= Pablo Zuloaga =

Spanish politician

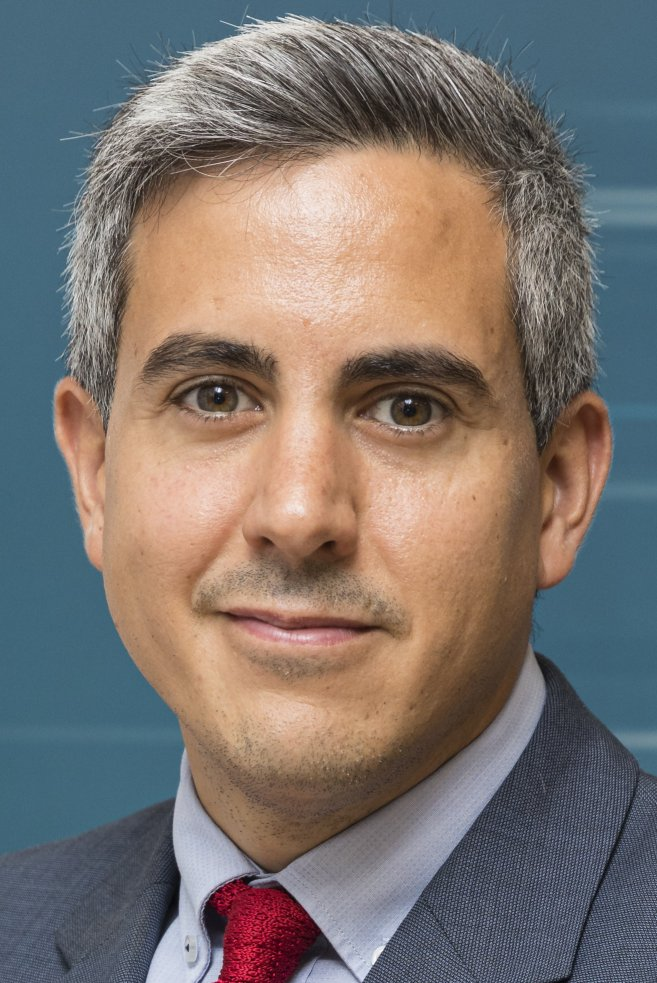

Vice President of Cantabria
- In office 8 July 2019 – 10 July 2023
- President: Miguel Ángel Revilla
- Preceded by: Eva Díaz Tezanos
- Succeeded by: Position abolished

Regional Minister of Universities, Equality, Culture and Sport of Cantabria
- In office 8 July 2019 – 10 July 2023
- President: Miguel Ángel Revilla
- Preceded by: Eva Díaz Tezanos (Universities, Research, Environment and Social Policy); Francisco Fernández Mañanes (Education, Culture and Sports)
- Succeeded by: Sergio Silva (Education, Vocational Training and Universities); Begoña Gómez del Río (Social Inclusion, Youth, Families and Equality); Eva Guillermina Fernández (Culture, Tourism and Sports)

Secretary General of the Socialist Party of Cantabria
- In office 16 July 2017 – 15 March 2025
- Preceded by: Eva Díaz Tezanos
- Succeeded by: Pedro Casares

Personal details
- Born: Pablo Zuloaga Martínez; 30 April 1981 (age 44) Santa Cruz de Bezana, Spain
- Party: PSOE

Pablo Zuloaga Martínez (born 30 April 1981) is a Spanish politician from the Spanish Socialist Workers' Party who served as Vice President of Cantabria and Regional Minister of Universities, Equality, Culture and Sport from July 2019 to July 2023. He has also led the PSC-PSOE since 2017.
