= Pedro Casares =

Spanish politician (born 1983)

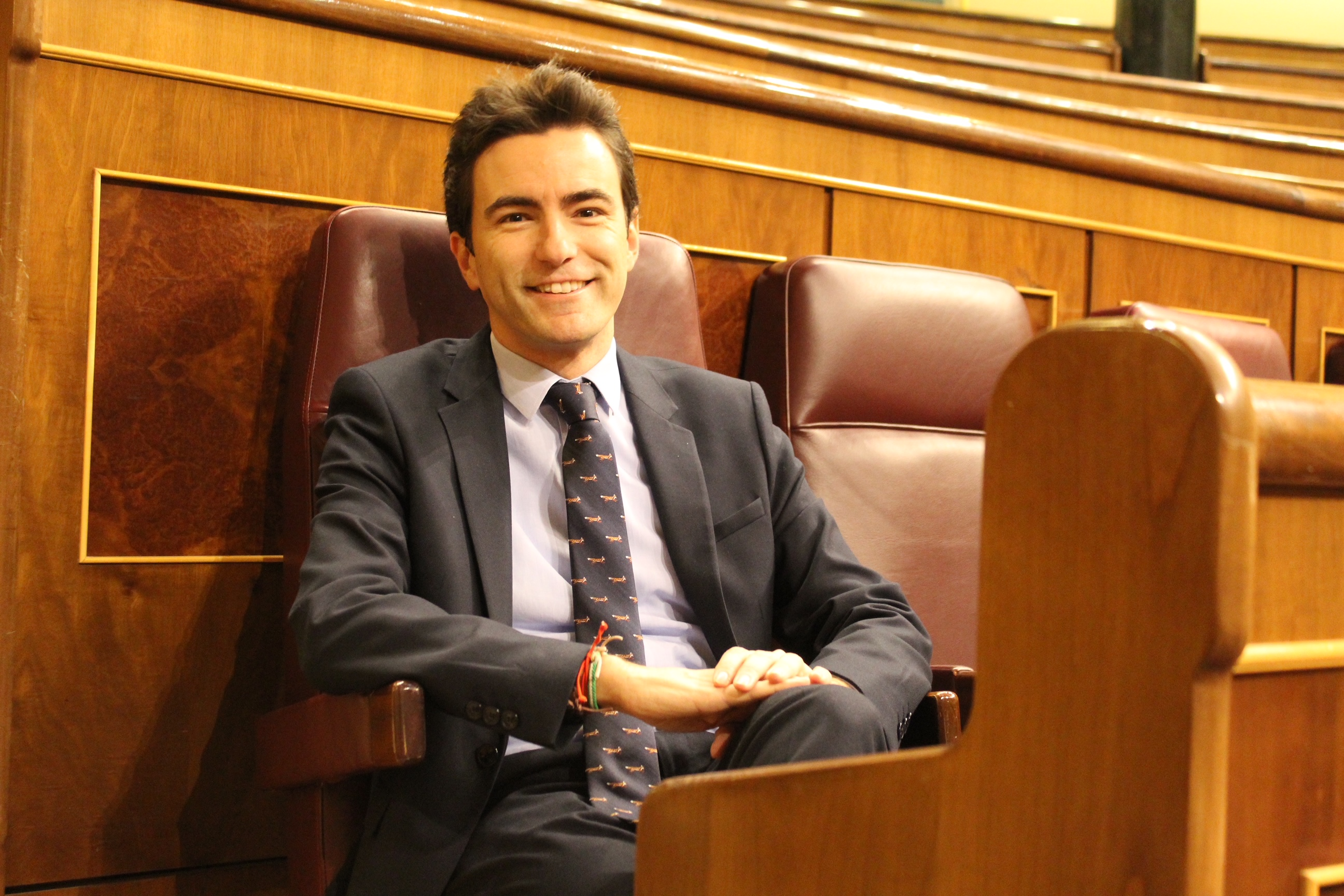
- Casares in 2020

Member of the Congress of Deputies
- In office 3 December 2019 – 29 July 2025
- Succeeded by: Pablo Antuñano Colina
- Constituency: Cantabria

Personal details
- Born: 5 October 1983 (age 42)
- Party: Socialist Party of Cantabria

Pedro Casares Hontañón (born 5 October 1983) is a Spanish politician serving as delegate of the government of Spain in Cantabria since 2025. From 2019 to 2025, he was a member of the Congress of Deputies.
