= José María Mazón =

Spanish politician (born 1951)

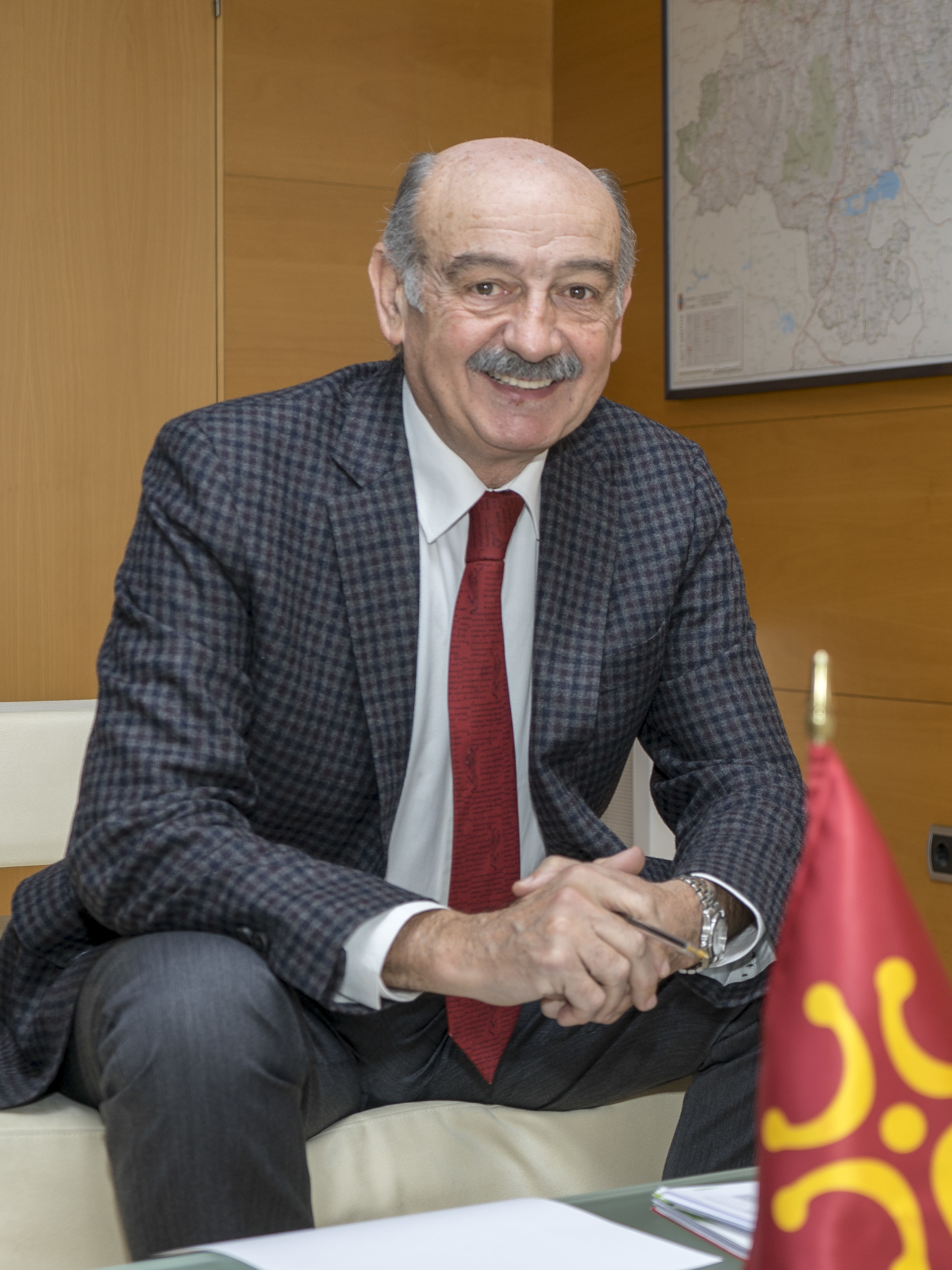

Member of the Congress of Deputies
- In office 21 May 2019 – 6 September 2023
- Constituency: Cantabria

Personal details
- Born: 23 July 1951 (age 74) Oviedo, Spain
- Party: Regionalist Party of Cantabria

José María Mazón Ramos (born 23 July 1951) is a Spanish engineer and politician affiliated to Regionalist Party of Cantabria. He is member of the Congress of Deputies for Cantabria since 2019 and spokesperson for Regionalist Party of Cantabria in the Mixed Group. He was re-elected in the November election.
