= 2019 Spanish regional elections =

- 28 April 2019; 26 May 2019

814 seats in the regional parliaments of Aragon, Asturias, Balearic Islands, Canary Islands, Cantabria, Castile and León, Castilla–La Mancha, Extremadura, La Rioja, Madrid, Murcia, Navarre and Valencian Community
Regional administrations by leading party in 2019
National parties
PSOE (9)
PP (5+1)
Cs (0+1)
Regional parties
JuntsxCat (1)
EAJ/PNV (1)
PRC (1)

Regional elections were held in Spain during 2019 to elect the regional parliaments of thirteen of the seventeen autonomous communities: Aragon, Asturias, the Balearic Islands, the Canary Islands, Cantabria, Castile and León, Castilla–La Mancha, Extremadura, La Rioja, Madrid, Murcia, Navarre and the Valencian Community. 814 of 1,208 seats in the regional parliaments were up for election. The elections were held on 26 May for most regions (concurrently with local elections all across the country, as well as the 2019 European Parliament election) and on 28 April in the Valencian Community (concurrently with a general election).

== Election date ==
Determination of election day varied depending on the autonomous community. Typically, most autonomous communities held their elections on the fourth Sunday of May every four years, concurrently with nationwide local elections, while others had their own, separate electoral cycles. In some cases, regional presidents had the prerogative to dissolve parliament and call for extra elections at a different time, but newly elected assemblies were restricted to serving out what remained of their previous four year-terms without altering the period to their next ordinary election. In other cases—Andalusia (since 1994), Aragon (2007), the Balearic Islands (2007), the Basque Country (1981), the Canary Islands (2018), Castile and León (2007), Catalonia (1985), Extremadura (2011), Galicia (1985), Navarre (2010) and the Valencian Community (2006)—the law granted regional presidents the power to call snap elections resulting in fresh four-year parliamentary terms.

By the time of the 2019 regional elections, this prerogative had been exercised by the Valencian Community by holding a snap regional election on 28 April 2019, but the region's electoral cycle was brought back to May in 2023, concurrently with most other regions.

== Regional governments ==
The following table lists party control in autonomous communities. Gains for a party are highlighted in that party's colour.

Election day	Region	Previous control	New control
28 April	Valencian Community	Spanish Socialist Workers' Party (PSOE)	Spanish Socialist Workers' Party (PSOE)
26 May	Aragon	Spanish Socialist Workers' Party (PSOE)	Spanish Socialist Workers' Party (PSOE)
26 May	Asturias	Spanish Socialist Workers' Party (PSOE)	Spanish Socialist Workers' Party (PSOE)
26 May	Balearic Islands	Spanish Socialist Workers' Party (PSOE)	Spanish Socialist Workers' Party (PSOE)
26 May	Canary Islands	Canarian Coalition (CC)	Spanish Socialist Workers' Party (PSOE)
26 May	Cantabria	Regionalist Party of Cantabria (PRC)	Regionalist Party of Cantabria (PRC)
26 May	Castile and León	People's Party (PP)	People's Party (PP)
26 May	Castilla–La Mancha	Spanish Socialist Workers' Party (PSOE)	Spanish Socialist Workers' Party (PSOE)
26 May	Extremadura	Spanish Socialist Workers' Party (PSOE)	Spanish Socialist Workers' Party (PSOE)
26 May	La Rioja	People's Party (PP)	Spanish Socialist Workers' Party (PSOE)
26 May	Madrid	People's Party (PP)	People's Party (PP)
26 May	Murcia	People's Party (PP)	People's Party (PP)
26 May	Navarre	Geroa Bai (GBai)	Spanish Socialist Workers' Party (PSOE)

== Summary by region ==
=== April (Valencian Community) ===
Parties and alliances	Votes	%	±pp	Seats	+/−
PSPV–PSOE	643,909	24.21	+3.64	27	+4
PP	508,534	19.12	–7.49	19	–12
Cs	470,676	17.70	+5.21	18	+5
Compromís	443,640	16.68	–1.78	17	–2
Vox	281,608	10.59	+10.17	10	+10
Unides Podem–EUPV	215,392	8.10	–7.63	8	–5
PACMA	38,447	1.45	+0.65	0	±0
Others	37,282	1.40		0	±0
Blank ballots	20,221	0.76	–0.62		
Valid votes	2,659,709	98.58	–0.02		
Invalid votes	38,225	1.42	+0.02		
Votes cast / turnout	2,697,934	73.72	+4.16		
Registered voters	3,659,514				

=== May (12 regions) ===
==== Aragon ====
Parties and alliances	Votes	%	±pp	Seats	+/−
PSOE	206,400	30.84	+9.41	24	+6
PP	139,660	20.87	–6.63	16	–5
Cs	111,602	16.67	+7.25	12	+7
Podemos–Equo	54,252	8.11	–12.64	5	–9
CHA	41,879	6.26	+1.68	3	+1
Vox	40,671	6.08	New	3	+3
PAR	33,978	5.08	–1.78	3	–3
IU	22,229	3.32	–0.90	1	±0
Others	12,082	1.81		0	±0
Blank ballots	6,587	0.98	–1.00		
Valid votes	669,340	99.33	+0.63		
Invalid votes	4,540	0.67	–0.63		
Votes cast / turnout	673,880	66.16	–0.17		
Registered voters	1,018,530				

==== Asturias ====
Parties and alliances	Votes	%	±pp	Seats	+/−
PSOE	187,462	35.26	+8.78	20	+6
PP	93,147	17.52	–4.07	10	–1
Cs	74,271	13.97	+6.85	5	+2
Podemos	58,674	11.04	–8.02	4	–5
IU–IAS	35,174	6.62	–5.32	2	–3
FAC	34,687	6.52	–1.67	2	–1
Vox	34,210	6.43	+5.84	2	+2
Others	8,221	1.55		0	±0
Blank ballots	5,858	1.10	–0.79		
Valid votes	531,704	99.06	+0.48		
Invalid votes	5,030	0.94	–0.48		
Votes cast / turnout	536,734	55.12	–0.67		
Registered voters	973,737				

==== Balearic Islands ====
Parties and alliances	Votes	%	±pp	Seats	+/−
PSIB–PSOE	117,480	27.37	+8.43	19	+5
PP	95,295	22.20	–6.11	16	–4
Cs	42,519	9.90	+3.51	5	+3
Podemos–EUIB	41,824	9.74	–6.66	6	–4
Més	39,415	9.18	–4.62	4	–2
Vox–ACTUA Baleares	34,871	8.12	New	3	+3
El Pi	31,348	7.30	–0.05	3	±0
MxMe	6,058	1.41	–0.11	2	–1
PACMA	6,021	1.40	+0.60	0	±0
GxF+PSOE+EUIB	2,036	0.47	+0.01	1	±0
Others	8,055	1.88		0	±0
Blank ballots	4,348	1.01	–0.86		
Valid votes	429,270	99.30	+0.67		
Invalid votes	3,009	0.70	–0.67		
Votes cast / turnout	432,279	53.93	–3.20		
Registered voters	801,618				

==== Canary Islands ====
Parties and alliances	Votes	%	±pp	Seats	+/−
PSOE	258,255	28.88	+8.99	25	+10
CCa–PNC	196,080	21.93	+0.09	20	+2
PP	135,722	15.18	–3.41	11	–1
NCa	80,891	9.05	–1.18	5	±0
Podemos–SSP–Equo	78,532	8.78	–5.76	4	–3
Cs	65,854	7.36	+1.42	2	+2
Vox	22,078	2.47	+2.27	0	±0
PACMA	10,029	1.12	–0.11	0	±0
IUC	9,115	1.02	–1.18	0	±0
ASG	6,222	0.70	+0.14	3	±0
Others	20,391	2.28		0	±0
Blank ballots	11,111	1.24	–0.59		
Valid votes	894,280	98.88	+0.68		
Invalid votes	10,089	1.12	–0.68		
Votes cast / turnout	904,369	52.59	–3.50		
Registered voters	1,719,640				

==== Cantabria ====
Parties and alliances	Votes	%	±pp	Seats	+/−
PRC	122,679	37.64	+7.75	14	+2
PP	78,347	24.04	–8.54	9	–4
PSOE	57,383	17.61	+3.57	7	+2
Cs	25,872	7.94	+1.00	3	+1
Vox	16,496	5.06	+4.72	2	+2
Podemos	10,224	3.14	–5.75	0	–3
IU+Equo	6,204	1.90	–1.13	0	±0
Others	5,518	1.69		0	±0
Blank ballots	3,180	0.98	–0.57		
Valid votes	325,903	99.02	+0.75		
Invalid votes	3,234	0.98	–0.75		
Votes cast / turnout	329,137	65.71	–0.52		
Registered voters	500,925				

==== Castile and León ====
Parties and alliances	Votes	%	±pp	Seats	+/−
PSOE	479,916	34.84	+8.90	35	+10
PP	433,905	31.50	–6.23	29	–13
Cs	205,855	14.94	+4.67	12	+7
Vox	75,731	5.50	+4.82	1	+1
Podemos–Equo	68,869	5.00	–7.14	2	–8
IU–A–PCAS/TC–ALTER	31,580	2.29	–1.86	0	–1
UPL	28,057	2.04	+0.49	1	±0
XAV	9,455	0.69	New	1	+1
Others	29,744	2.16		0	±0
Blank ballots	14,566	1.06	–1.38		
Valid votes	1,377,678	99.01	+1.08		
Invalid votes	13,824	0.99	–1.08		
Votes cast / turnout	1,391,502	65.80	+1.13		
Registered voters	2,114,811				

==== Castilla–La Mancha ====
Parties and alliances	Votes	%	±pp	Seats	+/−
PSOE	476,469	44.10	+7.99	19	+4
PP	308,184	28.53	–8.96	10	–6
Cs	122,955	11.38	+2.74	4	+4
Vox	75,813	7.02	+6.54	0	±0
Podemos–IU–Equo	74,777	6.92	–5.93	0	–2
Others	13,442	1.24		0	±0
Blank ballots	8,754	0.81	–0.94		
Valid votes	1,080,394	98.95	+1.13		
Invalid votes	11,506	1.05	–1.13		
Votes cast / turnout	1,091,900	69.45	–2.05		
Registered voters	1,572,308				

==== Extremadura ====
Parties and alliances	Votes	%	±pp	Seats	+/−
PSOE	287,619	46.77	+5.27	34	+4
PP	168,982	27.48	–9.52	20	–8
Cs	68,343	11.11	+6.72	7	+6
Podemos–IU–eX–Equo	44,309	7.20	–6.76	4	–2
Vox	28,992	4.71	+4.43	0	±0
Others	11,159	1.81		0	±0
Blank ballots	5,611	0.91	–0.43		
Valid votes	615,015	98.67	+0.53		
Invalid votes	8,273	1.33	–0.53		
Votes cast / turnout	623,288	69.26	–2.14		
Registered voters	899,930				

==== La Rioja ====
Parties and alliances	Votes	%	±pp	Seats	+/−
PSOE	63,068	38.67	+11.93	15	+5
PP	53,925	33.06	–5.56	12	–3
Cs	18,807	11.53	+1.10	4	±0
Podemos–IU–Equo	10,844	6.65	–8.72	2	–2
PR+	7,512	4.61	+0.16	0	±0
Vox	6,314	3.87	New	0	±0
PACMA	1,078	0.66	–0.08	0	±0
Blank ballots	1,555	0.95	–0.85		
Valid votes	163,103	98.99	+0.96		
Invalid votes	1,662	1.01	–0.96		
Votes cast / turnout	164,765	65.94	–1.35		
Registered voters	249,863				

==== Madrid ====
Parties and alliances	Votes	%	±pp	Seats	+/−
PSOE	884,218	27.31	+1.88	37	±0
PP	719,852	22.23	–10.85	30	–18
Cs	629,940	19.46	+7.31	26	+9
Más Madrid	475,672	14.69	New	20	+20
Vox	287,667	8.88	+7.70	12	+12
Podemos–IU	181,231	5.60	–17.20	7	–20
Others	44,259	1.37		0	±0
Blank ballots	15,020	0.46	–0.64		
Valid votes	3,237,859	99.58	+0.55		
Invalid votes	13,527	0.42	–0.55		
Votes cast / turnout	3,251,386	64.27	–1.42		
Registered voters	5,059,252				

==== Murcia ====
Parties and alliances	Votes	%	±pp	Seats	+/−
PSOE	212,600	32.47	+8.52	17	+4
PP	211,849	32.35	–5.00	16	–6
Cs	78,483	11.99	–0.58	6	+2
Vox	61,998	9.47	+8.62	4	+4
Podemos–Equo	36,486	5.57	–7.65	2	–4
MC–CCD	14,605	2.23	–0.20	0	±0
Somos Región	13,373	2.04	New	0	±0
CR (IU–LV+A)	13,252	2.02	–2.79	0	±0
Others	8,672	1.32		0	±0
Blank ballots	3,479	0.53	–1.04		
Valid votes	654,796	99.30	+1.30		
Invalid votes	4,641	0.70	–1.30		
Votes cast / turnout	659,437	62.33	–1.24		
Registered voters	1,057,978				

==== Navarre ====
Parties and alliances	Votes	%	±pp	Seats	+/−
NA+	127,346	36.57	+2.24	20	+3
PSN–PSOE	71,838	20.63	+7.26	11	+4
GBai	60,323	17.32	+1.49	9	±0
EH Bildu	50,631	14.54	+0.29	7	–1
Podemos	16,518	4.74	–8.93	2	–5
I–E	10,472	3.01	–0.68	1	–1
Vox	4,546	1.31	New	0	±0
Others	3,788	1.09		0	±0
Blank ballots	2,731	0.78	–1.18		
Valid votes	348,193	99.38	+0.63		
Invalid votes	2,169	0.62	–0.63		
Votes cast / turnout	350,362	68.53	+0.27		
Registered voters	511,225				

== Bibliography ==
- Ley Orgánica 5/1985, de 19 de junio, del Régimen Electoral General (Organic Law 5/1985). Official State Gazette (in Spanish). 19 June 1985 [version as of 6 March 2019]. BOE-A-1985-11672.
