= María José Sáenz de Buruaga =

Spanish politician

The Most Excellent María José Sáenz de Buruaga
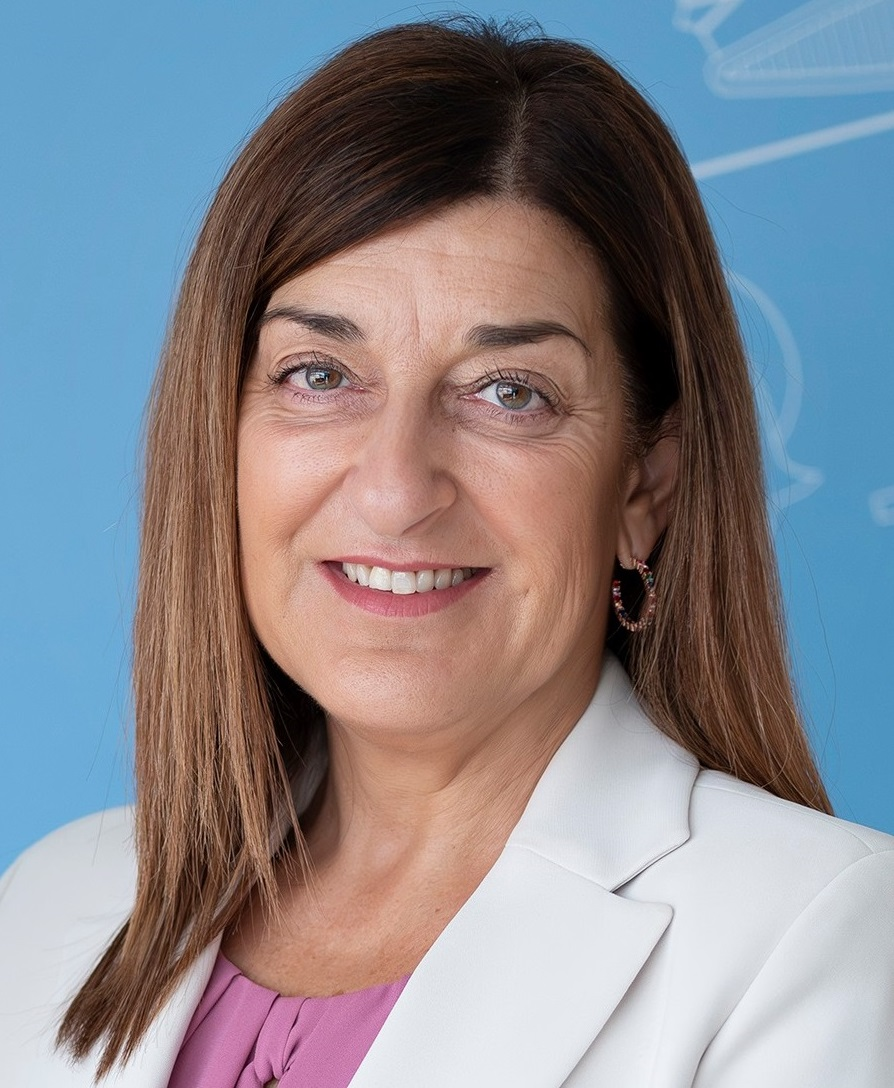
- Official portrait, 2024

10th President of Cantabria
- Incumbent
- Assumed office 5 July 2023
- Preceded by: Miguel Ángel Revilla

Secretary General of the People’s Party of Cantabria
- Incumbent
- Assumed office 25 March 2017
- Preceded by: Ignacio Diego

Vice President of Cantabria
- In office 28 June 2011 – 10 July 2015
- President: Ignacio Diego
- Preceded by: Dolores Gorostiaga
- Succeeded by: Eva Díaz Tezanos

Regional Minister of Health and Social Services of Cantabria
- In office 28 June 2011 – 10 June 2015
- President: Ignacio Diego
- Preceded by: Dolores Gorostiaga (Employment and Social Welfare); Luis Truán (Health)
- Succeeded by: Eva Díaz Tezanos (Universities, Research, Environment and Social Policy); María Luisa Real (Health)

Member of the Parliament of Cantabria
- Incumbent
- Assumed office 13 June 1999

Personal details
- Born: María José Sáenz de Buruaga Gómez; 4 June 1968 (age 58) Suances (Cantabria), Spain
- Party: PP
- Spouse: Miguel de las Cuevas
- Children: 1
- Education: University of Cantabria

María José Sáenz de Buruaga Gómez (born 4 June 1968) is a Spanish politician from the People’s Party (PP) serving as the President of Cantabria since 2023. President of the party's regional branch since 25 March 2017. She previously served as Vice President of Cantabria and Regional Minister of Health and Social Services from 2011 to 2015.

== Career ==
=== Political career ===
María joined the People's Party of Cantabria in 1991. In 1995, she was elected councilor in the Suances City Council, where she served as spokesperson for her group until 2007. She was president of the local party board from 1996 to 2010. At the same time, she obtained a seat as a member of the People's Party of Cantabria in 1999, being re-elected in 2003, 2007, 2011 and 2015. During the period between 2003 and 2011, she served as spokesperson for his group on Health and Social Services.

At the X Regional Congress of the PP of Cantabria, held in November 2004, she acceded to the position of general secretary of training at the regional level, which she revalidated at the congresses held in 2008 and 2012.

Between June 28, 2011, and July 10, 2015, she was the vice president and counselor of Health and Social Services of the Government of Cantabria after the electoral victory of the People's Party of Cantabria in the regional elections held on May 22 of that year.

After the People's Party of Cantabria lost its absolute majority in the elections held on May 24, 2015, she was elected second vice president of the Parliament of Cantabria, a position she already held between 2003 and 2011.

=== Minister for Health and Social Services of the Government of Cantabria ===
In 2011, she was elected Minister for Health and Social Services of the Government of Cantabria, with Ignacio Diego as president. During her tenure, the contract to complete the works of the Marqués de Valdecilla University Hospital was put out to tender. Also, the Laredo Childhood and Adolescent Care Center (a pioneering center in Cantabria in the prevention of family violence) was created.

=== President of Cantabria (2023-present) ===
After winning the elections in May 2023, the Parliament of Cantabria elected her as President of Cantabria in the second vote held on July 3. She became the first woman to preside over the community.

María took office on July 5, 2023, at the San Rafael Hospital, headquarters of the Parliament of Cantabria.
