= Miguel Ángel Revilla =

Spanish politician (born 1943)

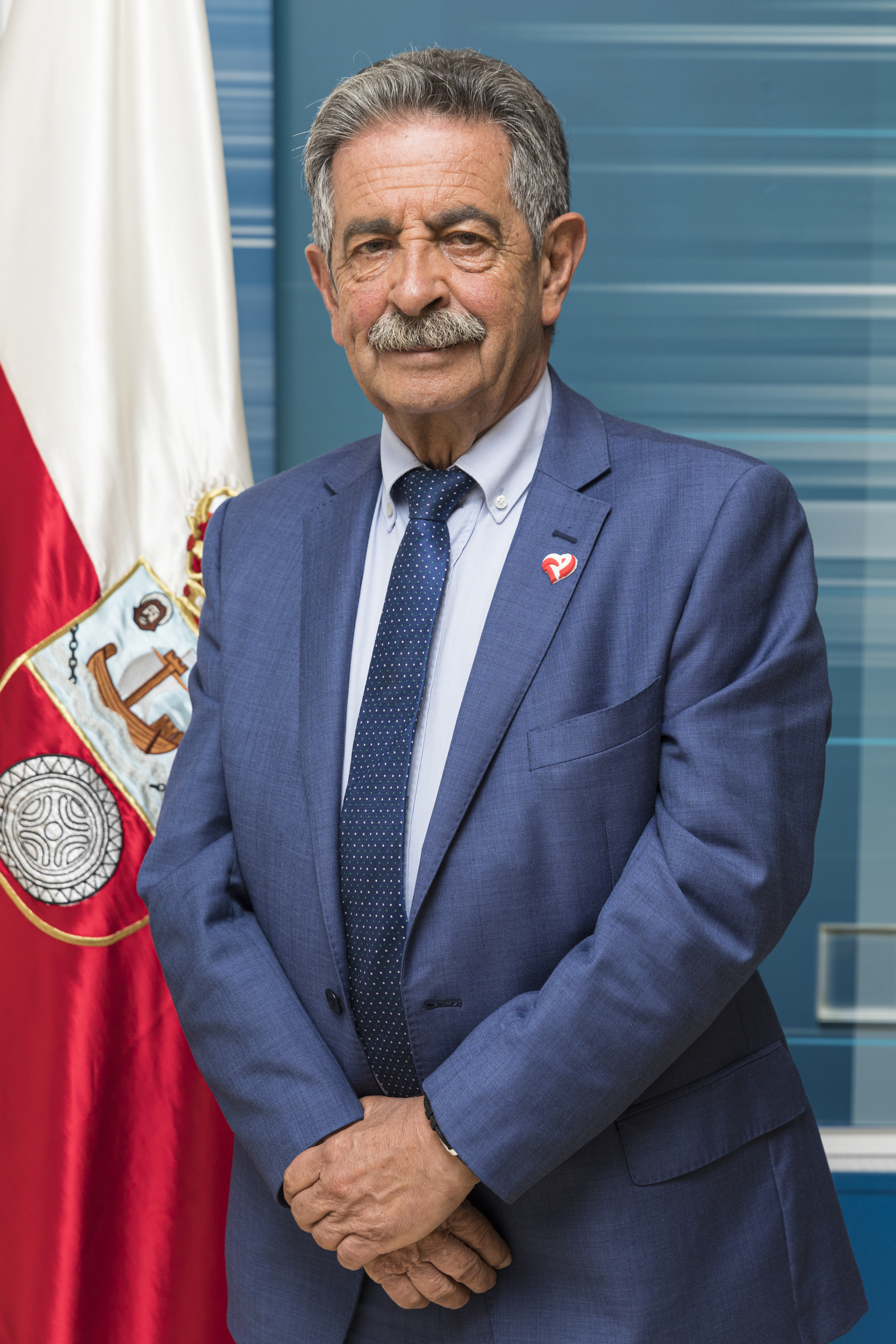
- Official portrait, 2019

7th and 9th President of Cantabria
- In office 7 July 2015 – 5 July 2023
- Preceded by: Ignacio Diego
- Succeeded by: María José Sáenz de Buruaga
- In office 27 June 2003 – 23 June 2011
- Preceded by: José Joaquín Martínez Sieso
- Succeeded by: Ignacio Diego

Secretary-General of the Regionalist Party of Cantabria
- Incumbent
- Assumed office 20 March 1988
- Preceded by: Eduardo Obregón

Vice President of Cantabria
- In office 14 July 1995 – 27 June 2003
- President: José Joaquín Martínez Sieso
- Preceded by: Roberto Bedoya
- Succeeded by: Dolores Gorostiaga

Member of the Parliament of Cantabria
- Incumbent
- Assumed office 8 May 1983

Personal details
- Born: Miguel Ángel Revilla Roiz; 23 January 1943 (age 83) Polaciones, Cantabria, Spain
- Party: PRC
- Spouse: Aurora Díaz Abella
- Children: 3
- Education: University of the Basque Country

Miguel Ángel Revilla Roiz (born 23 January 1943) is a Spanish politician, economist and bank employee. He served as 7th President of Cantabria from 2003 to 2011 and as the 9th president from 2015 to 2023, making him the longest serving holder of the office. He also served as the 5th Vice President of Cantabria from 1995 to 2003 and regional Minister of Public Works, Housing and Urbanism in the same period. Despite developing his political career at the regional level, he is very well known in national politics.

Revilla is a member and one of the founders of the Regionalist Party of Cantabria, being a Member of the Parliament of Cantabria since 1983, Spokesperson of the party in the Parliament from 1983 to 1995 and Secretary-General of the Party since 1988.

== Biography ==
=== Personal life and studies ===
Revilla was born in Salceda, a small town of the municipality of Polaciones, in 1943, when the province was called Santander. Revilla studied in the University of the Basque Country, where he graduated in Economic and Business Sciences and in banking and stock exchange.

Between 1974 and 1982 he was the director of the Banco Atlántico in the City of Torrelavega. Likewise, he was professor of Economic Structure in the School of Business Management of Santander before joining the University of Cantabria, where he served as Associated Professor of Economic Policy and Public Finances until 1995.

Revilla has three daughters, two of them from his first marriage and the youngest from his second marriage with Aurora Díaz Abella.

=== Political career ===
In 1971 he was the Delegate of the Spanish Syndical Organization (OSE) in Torrelavega.

In 1976, he was a founder of the Association in Defense of the Interests of Cantabria (ADIC), a pioneer organization in the defense of the autonomy of Cantabria, and later of the Regionalist Party of Cantabria (PRC), founded in 1978. In the fourth Regional Congress, on 20 March 1988, Miguel Ángel Revilla was elected for the first time as Secretary-General, a position that he has occupied uninterruptedly since then, with the ratification of the successive congresses.

He has served as Vice President and the Ministry of Public Works in the Government of Cantabria from 1995 to 2003 in two consecutive terms in a coalition government with the People's Party.

In the 2003 regional elections his party obtained the highest vote increase: 60 percent more than in the previous elections. On 27 June 2003, despite his party being the third most voted, Miguel Ángel Revilla, after a coalition with Spanish Socialist Workers' Party (PSOE), was elected as the 7th President of Cantabria. In the 2007 regional elections, PRC rose to second place, with a result that again gave them enough seats to form a coalition with the PSOE, being re-elected in June that year as president.

Revilla and his party did not run for the 2008 general election, although he publicly showed support to José Luis Rodríguez Zapatero. According to the Centre for Sociological Research, in 2010 he was the most valorated regional leader.

In the 2011 regional elections, PRC was also the second party, but the People's Party (PP) obtained an absolute majority and Revilla served as Leader of the Opposition from 2011 to 2015. In the 2015 regional elections, PP lost the absolute majority and PRC remained the second party; Revilla was elected president again with the support of PSOE to serve for a third term.

He ran for re-election in the 2019 regional elections, winning for the first time the elections and, with an agreement with the Socialist Party, Revilla was re-elected President for a fourth term.

=== Television celebrity ===
Thanks to his personality, Revilla has become a national television personality. He started as a commentator of current events and political affairs in the late night talk show Buenafuente, from 2007 to 2009. From 2010 to 2011 he was a guest in the television shows El Programa de Ana Rosa and La Noria. The money obtained from such collaborations was donated entirely to the Economic Kitchen of Santander (a non-profit organization to feed poor people).

Since 2013, he has appeared as a commentator on the program La Sexta Noche, as well as on Las Mañanas de Cuatro. Other shows that have featured Revilla include Abre los ojos y mira, Todo va bien, Viajando con Chester, Hable con ellas or Dos días y una noche.

In November 2014, he hosted his own program: Este país merece la pena.

He has also appeared as a guest on entertainment shows such as Mi casa es la tuya or El Hormiguero.

== Books ==
Apart from its political and television career, Revilla is also a writer. His books are mainly focused on politics, although some are about economy or his personal experiences.

- The economy of Cantabria (1978).
- No one is more than anyone (2012).
- The jungle of the smart ones (2014).
- This country is worth it (2014).
- Being happy is not expensive (2016).
- Uncensored (2018).

Political offices
Preceded by Roberto Bedoya	Vice President of Cantabria; 1995–2003	Succeeded by Lola Gorostiaga
Preceded by Ángel Madariaga	Councillor of Public Works of Cantabria; 1995–2003	Succeeded by José María Mazón
Preceded by José Joaquín Martínez Sieso	President of Cantabria; 2003–2011	Succeeded by Ignacio Diego
Preceded by Ignacio Diego	President of Cantabria; 2015–2023	Succeeded by María José Sáenz de Buruaga
Party political offices
Preceded by Eduardo Obregón	Secretary-General of the Regionalist Party of Cantabria; 1988–present	Incumbent
