= 1983 Cantabrian regional election =

Election in the Spanish region of Cantabria

- 8 May 1983

All 35 seats in the Regional Assembly of Cantabria 18 seats needed for a majority
- Opinion polls
- Registered: 384,993
- Turnout: 283,197 (73.4%)

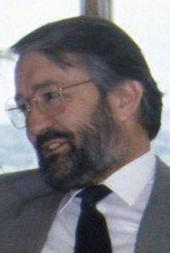

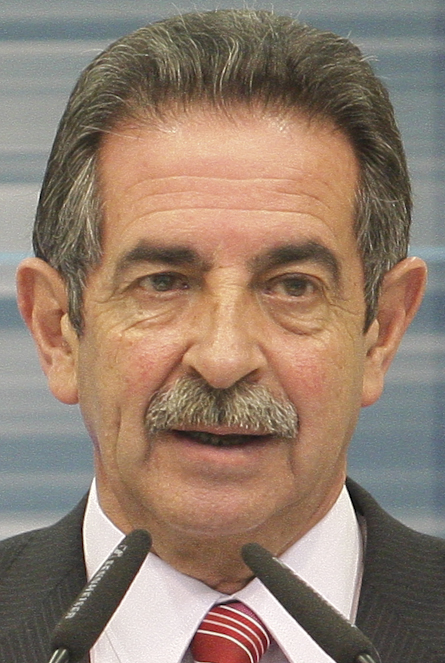
	First party	Second party	Third party
Leader	José A. Rodríguez Martínez	Jaime Blanco	Miguel Ángel Revilla
Party	AP–PDP–PL	PSOE	PRC
Leader since	21 March 1983	7 December 1980	1983
Seats won	18	15	2
Popular vote	122,748	107,168	18,767
Percentage	44.0%	38.4%	6.7%
President before election
José A. Rodríguez Martínez
Independent (AP–PDP–UL)
Elected President
José A. Rodríguez Martínez
Independent (AP–PDP–UL)

The 1983 Cantabrian regional election was held on 8 May 1983 to elect the 1st Regional Assembly of the autonomous community of Cantabria. All 35 seats in the Regional Assembly were up for election. It was held concurrently with regional elections in twelve other autonomous communities and local elections all throughout Spain.

The People's Coalition, an electoral alliance made up of the People's Alliance (AP), the People's Democratic Party (PDP) and the Liberal Union (UL) which fielded incumbent president José Antonio Rodríguez Martínez as its candidate, won the election with an unexpected absolute majority of seats in spite of the Spanish Socialist Workers' Party (PSOE) having won the October 1982 general election in the region. The PSOE came second with 15 seats, its defeat mainly attributed to independent mayor of Santander Juan Hormaechea's personal appeal in the concurrent local elections securing an insurmountable lead of 22,000 votes in favour of the Coalition in the capital city of Cantabria. The Regionalist Party of Cantabria (PRC) entered the Assembly with 2 seats. The former ruling party of Spain, the Union of the Democratic Centre (UCD), had chosen to dissolve itself in February 1983 and did not contest the election as a result.

While the election result would allow the Coalition's candidate, José Antonio Rodríguez, to get elected as regional president, a series of political discrepancies and a crisis between AP and PDP would lead to his resignation on 2 March 1984, being replaced by AP's Ángel Díaz de Entresotos until the end of the legislature.

== Overview ==
=== Electoral system ===
The Regional Assembly of Cantabria was the devolved, unicameral legislature of the autonomous community of Cantabria, having legislative power in regional matters as defined by the Spanish Constitution of 1978 and the regional Statute of Autonomy, as well as the ability to vote confidence in or withdraw it from a regional president.

Transitory Provision First of the Statute established a specific electoral procedure for the first election to the Regional Assembly of Cantabria, to be supplemented by the provisions within Royal Decree-Law 20/1977, of 18 March, and its related regulations. Voting for the Regional Assembly was on the basis of universal suffrage, which comprised all nationals over 18 years of age, registered in Cantabria and in full enjoyment of their civil and political rights. The 35 members of the Regional Assembly of Cantabria were elected using the D'Hondt method and a closed list proportional representation, with an electoral threshold of five percent of valid votes—which included blank ballots—being applied regionally.

=== Election date ===
The Regional Council of Cantabria was required to call an election to the Regional Assembly of Cantabria within from 1 February to 31 May 1983. On 7 March 1983, it was confirmed that the first election to the Regional Assembly of Cantabria would be held on 8 May, together with regional elections for twelve other autonomous communities as well as nationwide local elections, with the election decree being published in the Official State Gazette on 10 March.

== Background ==
The procedure for the approval of a regional statute of autonomy for Cantabria started after the Provincial Council of Santander, as well as more than two-thirds of the local councils in the province, voted for applying for autonomy as a single-province autonomous community out of historical reasons through the "slow-track" procedure set down under Article 143 of the Spanish Constitution of 1978. Cantabria was among the few regions not to have a pre-autonomic regime approved, together with La Rioja and Madrid.

Negotiations for the drafting of a Statute ensued between the parties with parliamentary representation in the province—the Union of the Democratic Centre (UCD), the Spanish Socialist Workers' Party (PSOE) and the Regionalist Party of Cantabria (PRC)—amid discussion on whether the province was to be integrated, either at the time or in the future, within the autonomous community of Castile and León (as the province of Santander had been part of the historical region of Old Castile). The regional Statute, which would establish the territory of the province as a single electoral constituency instead of the judicial districts which had been considered during the drafting process, was finally approved on 15 December 1981, coming into force on 31 January 1982.

Both the PSOE and the UCD saw internal party crises develop within their respective parties in the years preceding the regional election. The PSOE had seen a regional leadership lasting only nine months as a result of the resignation of party's secretary general Pilar Quintanal in August 1980, who had been elected to the post in November 1979, being replaced by Congress deputy Jaime Blanco.

The UCD crisis, which had initially started as an extension of the ongoing hardships within the national party with some members breaking away from the party's discipline, came further aggravated over the issue of the appointment of the new autonomous institutions as supporters of the incumbent president of the Regional Council, José Antonio Rodríguez Martínez, refused to support the party's official candidates, Leandro Valle as Rodríguez Martínez's successor and Justo de las Cuevas as Speaker of the Regional Assembly (the latter involved in a financial scandal). 8 UCD deputies rebelled on the party's discipline and allied with the PSOE, the PRC and the split Democratic Action Party (PAD) to have dissident UCD's Isaac Aja elected as the Assembly's Speaker, while maintaining Rodríguez Martínez in his post. All rebels, including Aja and Rodríguez Martínez, were subsequently expelled from the party, and the government formation delayed until April 1982, with the UCD subsequently dissolving local party groupings and sanctioning any party member who had shown support for the rebels. Later, the formation of the Democratic and Social Centre (CDS) by former prime minister Adolfo Suárez had a severe impact in the UCD regional as its leadership joined the new party.

== Parliamentary composition ==
The composition of the provisional Regional Assembly was determined by the provisions of Transitory Provision Fourth of the Statute, which established that its members be the elected deputies and senators for Cantabria in the Cortes Generales as well as the members of the Provincial Council of the then province of Santander. As a result, the composition of the provisional Regional Assembly of Cantabria upon its constitution in February 1982 was established as indicated below:

Parliamentary composition in February 1982
Parties	Cortes Generales		Prov. dep.	Seats	
Parties	Dep.	Sen.	Prov. dep.	Total	+/−
UCD (Note: One UCD deputy, Ciriaco Díaz Porras, had left the party and joined the PAD in November 1981. Also, two UCD members, Ambrosio Calzada Hernández and Leandro Valle González-Torre, served concurrently as senators and provincial deputies.)	2	3	16	21	n/a
PSOE	2	1	8	11	n/a
PRC	0	0	1	1	n/a
PAD	1	0	0	1	n/a
Total	5	4	25	34	n/a

The 1982 Spanish general election resulted in changes in the composition of the provisional regional assembly, in accordance with the new seat distribution of Cortes Generales members in the region. Changes shown include the expulsion of eight former UCD deputies in March 1982, with six joining the AP–PDP coalition after the general election and the other two remaining within the Mixed Group as independents.

Parliamentary composition in November 1982
Parties	Cortes Generales		Prov. dep.	Seats	
Parties	Dep.	Sen.	Prov. dep.	Total	+/−
PSOE (Note: One PSOE member, Jesús Cabezón Alonso, was elected as senator in the 1982 general election while concurrently serving as provincial deputy.)	3	3	7	13	+2
UCD	0	0	10	10	−11
AP–PDP (Note: Ambrosio Calzada Hernández served concurrently as senator and provincial deputy.)	2	1	5	8	+8
PRC	0	0	1	1	±0
PAD	0	0	0	0	−1
INDEP	0	0	2	2	+2
Total	5	4	25	34	±0

== Parties and candidates ==
The electoral law allowed for parties and federations registered in the interior ministry, coalitions and groupings of electors to present lists of candidates. Parties and federations intending to form a coalition ahead of an election were required to inform the relevant Electoral Commission within fifteen days of the election call, whereas groupings of electors needed to secure the signature of at least one-thousandth of the electorate in the constituencies for which they sought election—with a compulsory minimum of 500 signatures—disallowing electors from signing for more than one list of candidates. A minimum of three deputies was required for the constitution of parliamentary groups in the Regional Assembly of Cantabria.

Below is a list of the main parties and electoral alliances which contested the election:

Candidacy	Parties and alliances	Leading candidate	Ideology	Gov.	Ref.
AP–PDP–UL	List: People's Alliance (AP); People's Democratic Party (PDP); Liberal Union (UL)	José Antonio Rodríguez Martínez	Conservatism; Christian democracy	Yes	
PSOE	List: Spanish Socialist Workers' Party (PSOE)	Jaime Blanco	Social democracy	No	
PRC	List: Regionalist Party of Cantabria (PRC)	Miguel Ángel Revilla	Regionalism; Progressivism; Populism	No	

The electoral disaster of the Union of the Democratic Centre (UCD) in the October 1982 general election and the outcome of its extraordinary congress held in December, in which the party's leadership chose to transform the UCD into a Christian democratic political force, brought the party to a process of virtual disintegration as many of its remaining members either switched party allegiances, split into new, independent candidacies or left politics altogether. Subsequent attempts to seek electoral allies ahead of the incoming 1983 local and regional elections, mainly the conservative People's Alliance (AP) and the Christian democratic People's Democratic Party (PDP), had limited success due to concerns from both AP and UCD over such an alliance policy: AP strongly rejected any agreement that implied any sort of global coalition with UCD due to the party's ongoing decomposition, and prospects about a possible PDP–UCD merger did not come into fruition because of the latter's reluctance to dilute its brand within another party. By the time the UCD's executive had voted for the liquidation of the party's mounting debts and its subsequent dissolution on 18 February 1983, electoral alliances with the AP–PDP coalition had only been agreed in some provinces of the Basque Country and Galicia.

Together with AP, the PDP had agreed to maintain their general election alliance—now rebranded as the People's Coalition—for the May local and regional elections, with the inclusion of the Liberal Union (UL), a political party created in January 1983 out of independents from the AP–PDP coalition in an attempt to appeal to former UCD liberal voters. The Coalition had seen its numbers soar from late February as a result of many former members from the UCD's Christian democratic wing joining the PDP. Even before the dissolution of the UCD, several of its former members in Cantabria, such as Mayor of Santander Juan Hormaechea, had already announced their integration within AP–PDP lists as early as January 1983.

== Opinion polls ==
The tables below list opinion polling results in reverse chronological order, showing the most recent first and using the dates when the survey fieldwork was done, as opposed to the date of publication. Where the fieldwork dates are unknown, the date of publication is given instead. The highest percentage figure in each polling survey is displayed with its background shaded in the leading party's colour. If a tie ensues, this is applied to the figures with the highest percentages. The "Lead" column on the right shows the percentage-point difference between the parties with the highest percentages in a poll.

=== Voting intention estimates ===
The table below lists weighted voting intention estimates. Refusals are generally excluded from the party vote percentages, while question wording and the treatment of "don't know" responses and those not intending to vote may vary between polling organisations. When available, seat projections determined by the polling organisations are displayed below (or in place of) the percentages in a smaller font; 18 seats were required for an absolute majority in the Regional Assembly of Cantabria.

Polling firm/Commissioner	Fieldwork date	Sample size	Turnout	UCD	PSOE	AP–PDP–UL	PCE	CDS	PRC	Lead
1983 regional election	8 May 1983	—N/a	73.6	–	38.4; 15	44.0; 18	4.0; 0	2.6; 0	6.7; 2	5.6
Sofemasa/El País	23–26 Apr 1983	?	?	–	? 18/20	? 13/15	? 0	? 0	? 2	?
PSOE	Feb 1983	?	?	? 2	? 17	? 14	? 0	? 2	–	?
1982 general election	28 Oct 1982	—N/a	82.7	5.4 (2)	45.0 (17)	38.9 (Note: Results for AID (1979) and AP–PDP (1982).) (15)	3.1 (0)	5.1 (1)	–	6.1
1979 general election	1 Mar 1979	—N/a	70.5	41.9 (17)	30.3 (12)	10.3 (4)	6.6 (2)	–	–	11.6

=== Voting preferences ===
The table below lists raw, unweighted voting preferences.

Polling firm/Commissioner	Fieldwork date	Sample size	UCD	PSOE	AP–PDP–UL	PCE	CDS	PRC	PDL	Question	X mark	Lead
1983 regional election	8 May 1983	—N/a	–	30.5	31.9	2.9	1.9	4.9	1.2	—N/a	26.4	1.4
CISE–Metra Seis–ECO/CIS	5–8 Apr 1983	401	–	34.2	14.8	2.8	2.5	6.5	0.3	28.7	9.0	19.4
1982 general election	28 Oct 1982	—N/a	4.3	36.1	31.2	2.5	4.1	–	–	—N/a	17.3	4.9
1979 general election	1 Mar 1979	—N/a	28.9	20.9	7.1	4.6	–	–	–	—N/a	29.5	8.0

== Results ==
Summary of the 8 May 1983 Regional Assembly of Cantabria election results →
Parties and alliances	Popular vote			Seats	
Parties and alliances	Votes	%	±pp	Total	+/−
People's Coalition (AP–PDP–UL)	122,748	43.99	n/a	18	n/a
Spanish Socialist Workers' Party (PSOE)	107,168	38.41	n/a	15	n/a
Regionalist Party of Cantabria (PRC)	18,767	6.73	n/a	2	n/a
Communist Party of Spain (PCE)	11,052	3.96	n/a	0	n/a
Democratic and Social Centre (CDS)	7,164	2.57	n/a	0	n/a
Liberal Democratic Party (PDL)	4,474	1.60	n/a	0	n/a
United Cantabrian Left Group (AICU)	3,179	1.14	n/a	0	n/a
Cantabria Nationalist Electoral Group (AENC)	1,869	0.67	n/a	0	n/a
Ecologist Movement of Spain (MEE)	1,019	0.37	n/a	0	n/a
Blank ballots	1,569	0.56	n/a		
Total	279,009			35	n/a
Valid votes	279,009	98.52	n/a		
Invalid votes	4,188	1.48	n/a		
Votes cast / turnout	283,197	73.56	n/a		
Abstentions	101,796	26.44	n/a		
Registered voters	384,993				

Popular vote
AP–PDP–UL	43.99%
PSOE	38.41%
PRC	6.73%
PCE	3.96%
CDS	2.57%
PDL	1.60%
AICU	1.14%
Others	1.04%
Blank ballots	0.56%

Seats
AP–PDP–UL	51.43%
PSOE	42.86%
PRC	5.71%

== Aftermath ==
=== Government formation ===
Under Article 16 of the Statute, investiture processes to elect the president of the Regional Council of Cantabria required of an absolute majority—more than half the votes cast—to be obtained in the first ballot. If unsuccessful, a new ballot would be held 48 hours later requiring only of a simple majority—more affirmative than negative votes—to succeed. If the proposed candidate was not elected, successive proposals were to be transacted under the same procedure. In the event of the investiture process failing to elect a regional president within a two-month period from the first ballot, the Regional Assembly was to be automatically dissolved and a fresh election called, with elected lawmakers serving the remainder of its original four-year term.

In an investiture session held on 14 June 1983, José Antonio Rodríguez Martínez was re-elected as president of the Regional Council with an absolute majority of votes.

Investiture; José A. Rodríguez Martínez (Independent)
Ballot →	14 June 1983
Required majority →	18 out of 35
Yes: • AP–PDP–UL (18)	18 / 35
No: • PSOE (15); • PRC (2)	17 / 35
Abstentions	0 / 35
Absentees	0 / 35

=== 1983–84 government crisis ===
While AP and the PDP were the main parties forming the regional government, President José Antonio Rodríguez Martínez was an independent figure who did not belong to either party. Rodríguez and AP deputies within the People's Coalition had been forced to forcefully cohabitate throughout the first months of the legislature, until Rodríguez's dismissal of AP regional minister for Public Works Francisco Ignacio de Cáceres without prior consultation with the party's leadership resulted in the AP losing confidence in the regional president and in a breakup of the collaboration and the near-split of the AP–PDP alliance, as the later chose to side with Rodríguez.

AP demanded Rodríguez Martínez to hand over his post, which the later refused, amid accusations of "irresponsability" and of political meddling to coherce local mayors into supporting the regional president. Manuel Fraga's party subsequently threatened to bring Rodríguez down through a motion of no confidence which, nonetheless, required the votes from the PDP deputies that still supported the President. The personal intervention in the crisis of AP and PDP leaders, Manuel Fraga and Óscar Alzaga, in an effort to prevent it from escalating further and disrupting the nationwide alliance between both parties, eventually led to Rodríguez Martínez accepting to resign the post of regional president while retaining his seat in the Regional Assembly and abandoning the People's Coalition group, leaving the new government in a parliamentary minority. AP member Ángel Díaz de Entresotos was nominated by the Regional Assembly to replace Rodríguez Martínez, but the infighting within the parties forming the regional government would dominate the Cantabrian political landscape in the ensuing months.

Investiture; Ángel Díaz de Entresotos (AP)
Ballot →	16 March 1984	18 March 1984
Required majority →	18 out of 35	Simple
Yes: • AP–PDP–PL (17)	17 / 35	17 / 35
No: • PSOE (14); • PRC (2)	16 / 35	16 / 35
Abstentions: • PSOE (1); • Independent (1)	2 / 35	2 / 35
Absentees	0 / 35	0 / 35
