= 1987 Cantabrian regional election =

Election in the Spanish region of Cantabria

- 10 June 1987

All 39 seats in the Regional Assembly of Cantabria 20 seats needed for a majority
- Opinion polls
- Registered: 395,043 ▲2.6%
- Turnout: 299,115 (75.7%) ▲2.3 pp

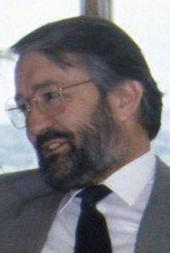

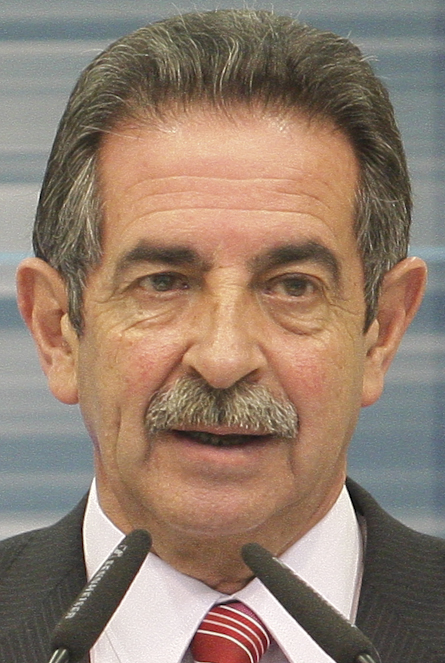

	First party	Second party	Third party
Leader	Juan Hormaechea	Jaime Blanco	Miguel Ángel Revilla
Party	AP	PSOE	PRC
Leader since	1987	1977	1983
Last election	18 seats, 44.0% (Note: Results for AP–PDP–UL in the 1983 election.)	15 seats, 38.4%	2 seats, 6.7%
Seats won	19	13	5
Seat change	▲1	▼2	▲3
Popular vote	122,964	87,230	37,950
Percentage	41.7%	29.6%	12.9%
Swing	▼2.3 pp	▼8.8 pp	▲6.2 pp
	Fourth party
Leader	Manuel Garrido
Party	CDS
Leader since	1987
Last election	0 seats, 2.6%
Seats won	2
Seat change	▲2
Popular vote	19,370
Percentage	6.6%
Swing	▲4.0 pp
President before election
Ángel Díaz de Entresotos
AP
Elected President
Juan Hormaechea
Independent

The 1987 Cantabrian regional election was held on 10 June 1987 to elect the 2nd Regional Assembly of the autonomous community of Cantabria. All 39 seats in the Regional Assembly were up for election. It was held concurrently with regional elections in 12 other autonomous communities and local elections all throughout Spain, as well as the 1987 European Parliament election.

The election was a victory for the People's Alliance (AP), which despite the breakup of the People's Coalition with the People's Democratic Party (PDP) and the Liberal Party (PL), remained the Assembly's largest force, albeit losing the absolute majority of seats it had held in the previous parliament. As in other communities, the Spanish Socialist Workers' Party (PSOE) lost votes and seats, while the Democratic and Social Centre (CDS) and Regionalist Party of Cantabria (PRC) made gains.

The legislature would be marked by dissensions between the elected President of Cantabria, Juan Hormaechea, and his own party AP (from 1989 the People's Party). In 1989 the PP would demand Hormaechea's resignation, but he would continue in a government formed by independents. In December 1990, he will be forced out by a no-confidence motion supported by PP, PSOE, PRC and CDS, which would result in a coalition government headed by Socialist Jaime Blanco being formed until the 1991 election.

== Overview ==
=== Electoral system ===
The Regional Assembly of Cantabria was the devolved, unicameral legislature of the autonomous community of Cantabria, having legislative power in regional matters as defined by the Spanish Constitution and the Cantabrian Statute of Autonomy, as well as the ability to vote confidence in or withdraw it from a President of the Regional Deputation. Voting for the Parliament was on the basis of universal suffrage, which comprised all nationals over 18 years of age, registered in Cantabria and in full enjoyment of their political rights.

The 39 members of the Regional Assembly of Cantabria were elected using the D'Hondt method and a closed list proportional representation, with an electoral threshold of five percent of valid votes—which included blank ballots—being applied regionally.

The electoral law provided that parties, federations, coalitions and groupings of electors were allowed to present lists of candidates. However, groupings of electors were required to secure the signature of at least 1 percent of the electors registered in Cantabria. Electors were barred from signing for more than one list of candidates. Concurrently, parties and federations intending to enter in coalition to take part jointly at an election were required to inform the relevant Electoral Commission within ten days of the election being called.

=== Election date ===
The term of the Regional Assembly of Cantabria expired four years after the date of its previous election. Election day was to take place between the thirtieth and the sixtieth day from the expiration date of parliament. The previous election was held on 8 May 1983, which meant that the legislature's term would have expired on 8 May 1987. The election was required to take place no later than the sixtieth day from the expiration date of parliament, setting the latest possible election date for the Parliament on 7 July 1987.

The Regional Assembly of Cantabria could not be dissolved before the expiration date of parliament except in the event of an investiture process failing to elect a regional President within a two-month period from the first ballot. In such a case, the Regional Assembly was to be automatically dissolved and a snap election called, with elected lawmakers serving the remainder of its original four-year term.

== Opinion polls ==
The table below lists voting intention estimates in reverse chronological order, showing the most recent first and using the dates when the survey fieldwork was done, as opposed to the date of publication. Where the fieldwork dates are unknown, the date of publication is given instead. The highest percentage figure in each polling survey is displayed with its background shaded in the leading party's colour. If a tie ensues, this is applied to the figures with the highest percentages. The "Lead" column on the right shows the percentage-point difference between the parties with the highest percentages in a poll. When available, seat projections determined by the polling organisations are displayed below (or in place of) the percentages in a smaller font; 20 seats were required for an absolute majority in the Regional Assembly of Cantabria.

Polling firm/Commissioner	Fieldwork date	Sample size	Turnout	AP–PDP–PL	PSOE	PRC	IU	CDS	AP	PDP	Lead
1987 regional election	10 Jun 1987	—N/a	75.7	–	29.6; 13	12.9; 5	3.6; 0	6.6; 2	41.7; 19	2.4; 0	12.1
Demoscopia/El País	22–26 May 1987	?	74	–	34.8; 14/15	8.2; 3	5.9; 0/2	11.8; 5	36.9; 15/16	–	2.1
Sofemasa/AP	16 Apr 1987	?	?	–	30.2	–	3.2	16.2	34.8	–	4.6
1986 general election	22 Jun 1986	—N/a	73.4	34.1 (15)	44.3 (19)	–	3.1 (0)	13.0 (5)	(Note: Within CP.)		10.2
1983 regional election	8 May 1983	—N/a	73.6	44.0; 18	38.4; 15	6.7; 2	4.0 (Note: Result for PCE.); 0	2.6; 0			5.6

== Results ==
← Summary of the 10 June 1987 Regional Assembly of Cantabria election results →
Parties and alliances	Popular vote			Seats	
Parties and alliances	Votes	%	±pp	Total	+/−
People's Alliance (AP)^{1}	122,964	41.68	−2.31	19	+1
Spanish Socialist Workers' Party (PSOE)	87,230	29.57	−8.84	13	−2
Regionalist Party of Cantabria (PRC)	37,950	12.86	+6.13	5	+3
Democratic and Social Centre (CDS)	19,370	6.57	+4.00	2	+2
United Left (IU)^{2}	10,659	3.61	−0.35	0	±0
People's Democratic Party (PDP)	6,964	2.36	New	0	±0
Workers' Party of Spain–Communist Unity (PTE–UC)	2,441	0.83	New	0	±0
Radicals' Movement for Cantabria (MRC)	1,863	0.63	New	0	±0
Internationalist Socialist Workers' Party (POSI)	1,518	0.51	New	0	±0
Humanist Platform (PH)	767	0.26	New	0	±0
Blank ballots	3,292	1.12	+0.56		
Total	295,018			39	+4
Valid votes	295,018	98.63	+0.11		
Invalid votes	4,097	1.37	−0.11		
Votes cast / turnout	299,115	75.72	+2.16		
Abstentions	95,928	24.28	−2.16		
Registered voters	395,043				
Sources
Footnotes: ^{1} People's Alliance results are compared to People's Coalition totals in the 1983 election.; ^{2} United Left results are compared to Communist Party of Spain totals in the 1983 election.

Popular vote
AP	41.68%
PSOE	29.57%
PRC	12.86%
CDS	6.57%
IU	3.61%
PDP	2.36%
Others	2.23%
Blank ballots	1.12%

Seats
AP	48.72%
PSOE	33.33%
PRC	12.82%
CDS	5.13%

== Aftermath ==
=== Government formation ===
Investiture; Juan Hormaechea (Independent)
Ballot →	22 July 1987	24 July 1987
Required majority →	20 out of 39	Simple
Yes: • AP (19)	19 / 39	19 / 39
No: • PSOE (13) (12 on 24 Jul); • PRC (5)	18 / 39	17 / 39
Abstentions: • CDS (2)	2 / 39	2 / 39
Absentees: • PSOE (1) (on 24 Jul)	0 / 39	1 / 39

=== 1990 motion of no confidence ===
Motion of no confidence Jaime Blanco (PSOE)
Ballot →	5 December 1990
Required majority →	20 out of 39
Yes: • PSOE (12); • PP (7); • PRC (3); • CDS (2); • Independents (2)	26 / 39
No: • UPCA (11); • PNC (1)	12 / 39
Abstentions: • PSOE (1)	1 / 39
Absentees	0 / 39
