= 1991 Cantabrian regional election =

Election in the Spanish region of Cantabria

- 26 May 1991

All 39 seats in the Regional Assembly of Cantabria 20 seats needed for a majority
- Opinion polls
- Registered: 412,406 ▲4.4%
- Turnout: 298,348 (72.3%) ▼3.4 pp
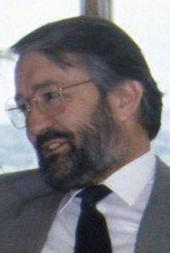

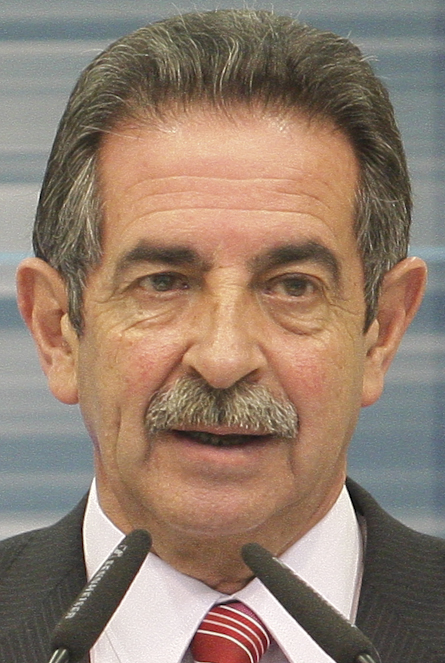

	First party	Second party	Third party
Leader	Jaime Blanco	Juan Hormaechea	José Luis Vallines
Party	PSOE	UPCA	PP
Leader since	1977	23 January 1991	1990
Last election	13 seats, 29.6%	Did not contest	18 seats, 43.7% (Note: Results for AP (41.68%, 19 seats) and PDP (2.36%, 0 seats) in the 1987 election.)
Seats won	16	15	6
Seat change	▲3	▲15	▼12
Popular vote	102,958	99,194	42,714
Percentage	34.8%	33.5%	14.4%
Swing	▲5.2 pp	New party	▼29.3 pp
	Fourth party	Fifth party	Sixth party
Leader	Miguel Ángel Revilla	Ángel Agudo	Manuel Garrido
Party	PRC	IU	CDS
Leader since	1983	1983	1987
Last election	5 seats, 12.9%	0 seats, 3.6%	3 seats, 6.6%
Seats won	2	0	0
Seat change	▼3	0	▼3
Popular vote	18,789	13,023	7,926
Percentage	6.4%	4.4%	2.7%
Swing	▼6.5 pp	▲0.8 pp	▼3.9 pp
President before election
Jaime Blanco
PSOE
Elected President
Juan Hormaechea
UPCA

The 1991 Cantabrian regional election was held on 26 May 1991 to elect the 3rd Regional Assembly of the autonomous community of Cantabria. All 39 seats in the Regional Assembly were up for election. It was held concurrently with regional elections in 12 other autonomous communities and local elections all throughout Spain.

The Spanish Socialist Workers' Party (PSOE) under incumbent President Jaime Blanco went on to win its first and only regional election in Cantabria. Juan Hormaechea's Union for the Progress of Cantabria (UPCA), a split from the People's Party (PP), won 15 seats and 33% of the vote, with the PP vote collapsing to 6 seats and 14% of the vote as a result. The Regionalist Party of Cantabria (PRC) suffered from the UPCA's surge and returned to its 1983 results, while the Democratic and Social Centre did not reach the required 5% threshold and was expelled from parliament.

Juan Hormaechea managed to get re-elected as regional President thanks to a UPCA-PP agreement. He had been forced to resign in late 1990, after a no-confidence motion was passed against him by an alliance of PSOE, PP, PRC and CDS.

== Overview ==
=== Electoral system ===
The Regional Assembly of Cantabria was the devolved, unicameral legislature of the autonomous community of Cantabria, having legislative power in regional matters as defined by the Spanish Constitution and the Cantabrian Statute of Autonomy, as well as the ability to vote confidence in or withdraw it from a President of the Regional Deputation. Voting for the Parliament was on the basis of universal suffrage, which comprised all nationals over 18 years of age, registered in Cantabria and in full enjoyment of their political rights.

The 39 members of the Regional Assembly of Cantabria were elected using the D'Hondt method and a closed list proportional representation, with an electoral threshold of five percent of valid votes—which included blank ballots—being applied regionally.

The electoral law provided that parties, federations, coalitions and groupings of electors were allowed to present lists of candidates. However, groupings of electors were required to secure the signature of at least 1 percent of the electors registered in Cantabria. Electors were barred from signing for more than one list of candidates. Concurrently, parties and federations intending to enter in coalition to take part jointly at an election were required to inform the relevant Electoral Commission within ten days of the election being called.

=== Election date ===
The term of the Regional Assembly of Cantabria expired four years after the date of its previous election. Legal amendments earlier in 1991 established that elections to the Regional Assembly were to be fixed for the fourth Sunday of May every four years. The previous election was held on 10 June 1987, setting the election date for the Parliament on 26 May 1991.

The Regional Assembly of Cantabria could not be dissolved before the expiration date of parliament except in the event of an investiture process failing to elect a regional President within a two-month period from the first ballot. In such a case, the Regional Assembly was to be automatically dissolved and a snap election called, with elected lawmakers serving the remainder of its original four-year term.

== Background ==
The 1987 election had seen AP candidate Juan Hormaechea win the election with 19 out of 39 seats, 1 short for the absolute majority. Hormaechea, who had been Mayor of Santander between 1974 and 1987 and stood as an independent within AP, was elected as President of Cantabria thanks to the abstention vote of the CDS two deputies.

However, from the beginning Hormaechea's tenure as regional President was controversial. Shortly after being elected, in August 1987, Hormaechea announced "difficulties" in forming a regional government, claiming pressures from AP to force him to name prominent party members as regional ministers, accusing AP of "seeking to create wealth for themselves instead of wanting to serve the region" and threatening to resign from his office. The government crisis was temporarily solved with the naming of three independents and four AP members as regional ministers.

Hormaechea would star another incidents throughout the legislature, including insults to other parties' deputies, accusations to the Assembly Speaker Eduardo Obregón (PSOE) of official misconduct (which resulted in a legal complaint against Hormaechea), as well as accusations from the three opposition parties (PSOE, PRC and CDS) of a continued disregard for the regional chamber. Hormaechea was also accused of political misconduct, such as extorting other deputies in exchange of their votes, bribing MPs from other parties, as well as influence peddling favoring family members and physically attacking a PSOE senator.

Further, in late 1989, a controversy arose after Hormaechea declared he was not supporting the People's Party, successor party to AP, for that year's general election. From that point, the deteriorating relationship between the PP and Hormaechea as a result of the latter's personalism and marginalization of the party's structure in the region triggered a political crisis. Hormaechea's insults to party leaders in late 1990 motivated the PP's decision not to choose him as candidate for the incoming 1991 election, as well as the party presenting a motion of censure on Hormaechea to remove him from the regional government, with the support from the PSOE, PRC and CDS, electing PSOE leader Jaime Blanco as the head of a coalition administration for the remainder of the legislature. This caused a split within the regional PP, with 12 deputies supporting Hormaechea and 7 supporting the no-confidence motion against him. Hormaechea's grouping went on to form a separate party, the Union for the Progress of Cantabria (UPCA), to stand for the 1991 election.

== Campaign ==
The unveiling of irregularities within the finances of Hormaechea's government conducted by Blanco's coalition government marked the electoral campaign into the 1991 election. Hormaechea's management of the regional budget had left a public debt worth of 80,000 million pesetas, while auditors discovered expenditures during the 1987-1990 period that were difficult to justify, with evidence pointing to embezzlement during Hormaechea's tenure.

The Spanish Socialist Workers' Party (PSOE) tried to benefit from the split in the centre-right vote, with former Deputy Prime Minister Alfonso Guerra asking conservative voters to vote the PSOE "for this time", reminding the chaotic political situation of the community as a result of the infighting between former President Juan Hormaechea and the People's Party leadership.

== Opinion polls ==
The table below lists voting intention estimates in reverse chronological order, showing the most recent first and using the dates when the survey fieldwork was done, as opposed to the date of publication. Where the fieldwork dates are unknown, the date of publication is given instead. The highest percentage figure in each polling survey is displayed with its background shaded in the leading party's colour. If a tie ensues, this is applied to the figures with the highest percentages. The "Lead" column on the right shows the percentage-point difference between the parties with the highest percentages in a poll. When available, seat projections determined by the polling organisations are displayed below (or in place of) the percentages in a smaller font; 20 seats were required for an absolute majority in the Regional Assembly of Cantabria.

Polling firm/Commissioner	Fieldwork date	Sample size	Turnout	AP	PSOE	PRC	CDS	IU	PDP	PP	UPCA	Lead
1991 regional election	26 May 1991	—N/a	72.3	(Note: Within PP.)	34.8; 16	6.4; 2	2.7; 0	4.4; 0		14.4; 6	33.5; 15	1.3
Sigma Dos/El Mundo	18 May 1991	?	?		35.1; 15/16	8.4; 3	4.5; 0	5.2; 2		16.3; 7	26.5; 11/12	8.6
Metra Seis/El Independiente	12 May 1991	?	?		30.6; 13/14	11.0; 4/5	2.7; 0	7.4; 3		23.0; 10	18.8; 8	7.6
Demoscopia/El País	4–7 May 1991	400	?		32.0; 14	8.5; 3	5.0; 0/2	7.8; 2/3		18.8; 8	24.1; 10/11	7.9
Eco–Gabes	10 Nov 1990	?	?		33.2; 14	6.1; 2	–	–		8.1; 3	46.9; 20	13.7
Demoscopia Hemopública	2 Oct 1990	?	?		27.0; 11	8.0; 3	–	–		9.0; 3	49.5; 22	22.5
Eco–Gabes	17 Mar 1990	1,860	?		32.0	–	–	–		48.3	–	16.3
1989 general election	29 Oct 1989	—N/a	74.3		40.1 (17)	–	9.7 (4)	6.4 (2)		38.4 (16)	–	1.7
1989 EP election	15 Jun 1989	—N/a	60.5		40.3 (20)	–	7.0 (3)	4.2 (0)		32.0 (16)	–	8.3
1987 regional election	10 Jun 1987	—N/a	75.7	41.7; 19	29.6; 13	12.9; 5	6.6; 2	3.6; 0	2.4; 0	–	–	12.1

== Results ==
← Summary of the 26 May 1991 Regional Assembly of Cantabria election results →
Parties and alliances	Popular vote			Seats	
Parties and alliances	Votes	%	±pp	Total	+/−
Spanish Socialist Workers' Party (PSOE)	102,958	34.81	+5.24	16	+3
Union for the Progress of Cantabria (UPCA)	99,194	33.53	New	15	+15
People's Party (PP)^{1}	42,714	14.44	−29.60	6	−13
Regionalist Party of Cantabria (PRC)	18,789	6.35	−6.51	2	−3
United Left (IU)	13,023	4.40	+0.79	0	±0
Democratic and Social Centre (CDS)	7,926	2.68	−3.89	0	−2
The Greens (LV)	2,045	0.69	New	0	±0
Neighborhood Group of Cantabria (AAVV–C)	1,445	0.49	New	0	±0
Ecologist–Humanist List (LE–H)^{2}	1,184	0.40	+0.13	0	±0
Communist Party of the Peoples of Spain (PCPE)	896	0.30	New	0	±0
Nationalist Party of Cantabria (PNC)	623	0.21	New	0	±0
Blank ballots	5,009	1.69	+0.57		
Total	295,806			39	±0
Valid votes	295,806	99.15	+0.52		
Invalid votes	2,542	0.85	−0.52		
Votes cast / turnout	298,348	72.34	−3.38		
Abstentions	114,058	27.66	+3.38		
Registered voters	412,406				
Sources
Footnotes: ^{1} People's Party results are compared to the combined totals of People's Alliance and People's Democratic Party in the 1987 election.; ^{2} Ecologist–Humanist List results are compared to Humanist Platform totals in the 1987 election.

Popular vote
PSOE	34.81%
UPCA	33.53%
PP	14.44%
PRC	6.35%
IU	4.40%
CDS	2.68%
Others	2.09%
Blank ballots	1.69%

Seats
PSOE	41.03%
UPCA	38.46%
PP	15.38%
PRC	5.13%

== Aftermath ==
=== Government formation ===
Investiture; Juan Hormaechea (UPCA)
Ballot →	2 July 1991
Required majority →	20 out of 39
Yes: • UPCA (15); • PP (6)	21 / 39
No: • PSOE (16); • PRC (2)	18 / 39
Abstentions	0 / 39
Absentees	0 / 39

=== 1993 motion of no confidence ===
Motion of no confidence Jaime Blanco (PSOE)
Ballot →	1 July 1993
Required majority →	20 out of 39
Yes: • PSOE (16); • PRC (2)	18 / 39
No: • PP (12); • UPCA (9)	21 / 39
Abstentions	0 / 39
Absentees	0 / 39

=== 1994 motion of no confidence ===
Motion of no confidence Jaime Blanco (PSOE)
Ballot →	5 January 1994
Required majority →	20 out of 39
Yes: • PSOE (16); • PRC (2)	18 / 39
No: • PP (9); • UPCA (8)	17 / 39
Abstentions: • UxC (4)	4 / 39
Absentees	0 / 39

=== 1994 failed investiture attempts ===
Investiture; José Luis Vallines (PP)
Ballot →	23 November 1994	25 November 1994
Required majority →	20 out of 39	Simple
Yes: • PP (9); • UxC (4)	13 / 39	13 / 39
No: • PSOE (16); • UPCA (7)	23 / 39	23 / 39
Abstentions: • PRC (2)	2 / 39	2 / 39
Absentees: • UPCA (1)	1 / 39	1 / 39

Investiture; Miguel Ángel Revilla (PRC)
Ballot →	27 December 1994	29 December 1994
Required majority →	20 out of 39	Simple
Yes: • PSOE (16) (15 on 27 Dec); • PRC (2)	17 / 39	18 / 39
No: • PP (9); • UPCA (7); • UxC (4) (3 on 27 Dec)	19 / 39	20 / 39
Abstentions	2 / 39	2 / 39
Absentees: • UPCA (1); • PSOE (1) (on 27 Dec); • UxC (1) (on 27 Dec)	3 / 39	1 / 39
