= Cantabria (Congress of Deputies constituency) =

Electoral constituency in Spain

Coordinates: 43°20′N 4°00′W

- Congress of Deputies; Electoral constituency
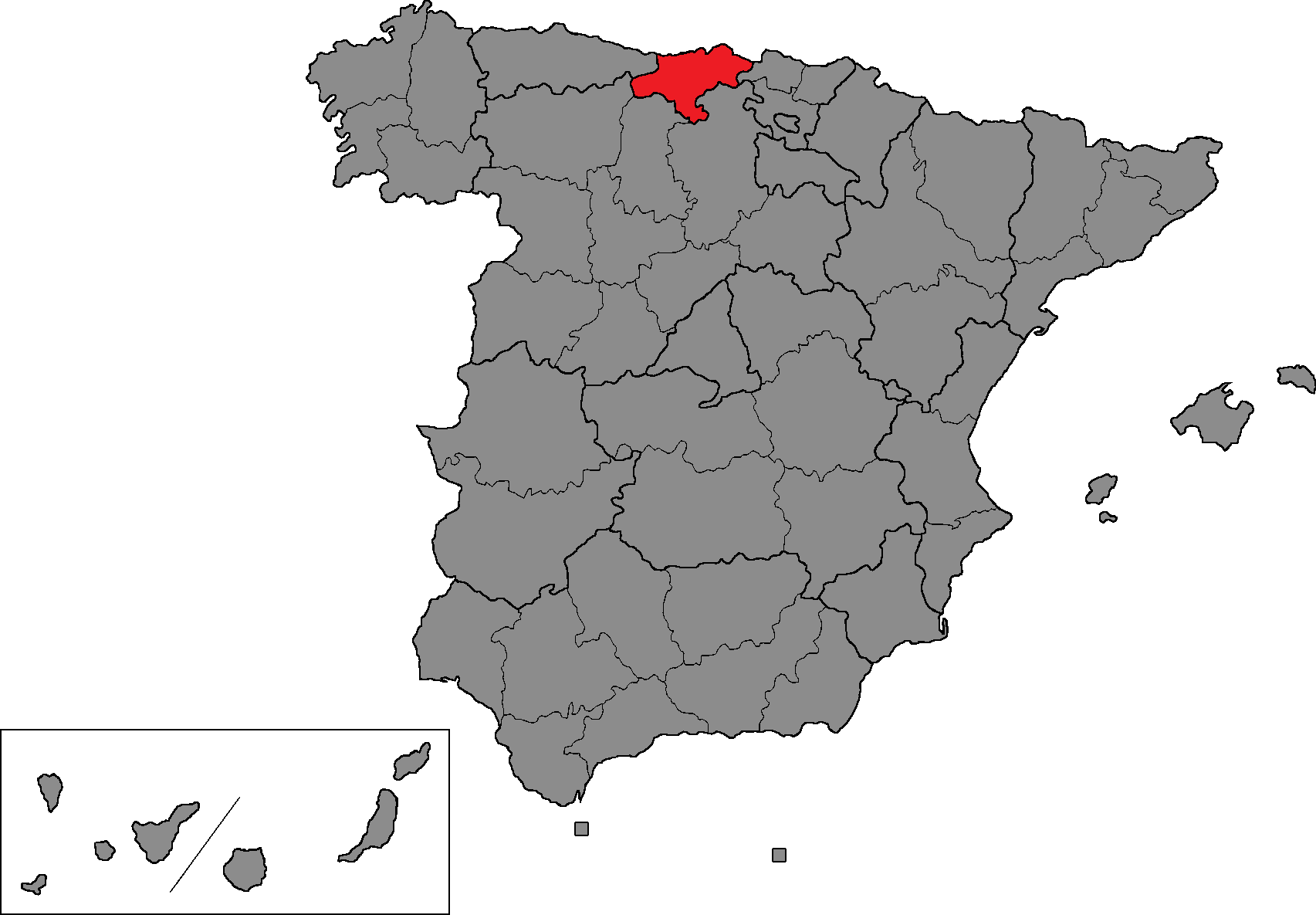
- Location of Cantabria within Spain
- Province: Cantabria
- Autonomous community: Cantabria
- Population: ▲591,563 (2024)
- Electorate: ▲507,818 (2023)
- Major settlements: Santander, Torrelavega

Current constituency
- Created: 1977
- Seats: 5
- Members: PP (2); PSOE (2); Vox (1)

Cantabria—Santander until 1982—is one of the 52 constituencies represented in the Congress of Deputies, the lower chamber of the Spanish parliament, the Cortes Generales. The constituency (whose boundaries correspond to those of the homonymous province) currently elects five deputies. The electoral system uses the D'Hondt method and closed-list proportional voting, with a minimum threshold of three percent.

== Electoral system ==
The constituency was created as per the Political Reform Law and was first contested in the 1977 general election. The Law provided for the provinces of Spain to be established as multi-member districts in the Congress of Deputies, with this regulation being maintained under the Spanish Constitution of 1978. Additionally, the Constitution requires for any modification of the provincial limits to be approved under an organic law, needing an absolute majority in the Cortes Generales.

Voting is based on universal suffrage, comprising all Spanish nationals over 18 years of age with full political rights, provided that they have not been deprived of the right to vote by a final sentence. The only exception was in 1977, when this was limited to nationals over 21 years of age and in full enjoyment of their political and civil rights. Amendments in 2011 required non-resident citizens to apply for voting, a system known as "begged" voting (Spanish: Voto rogado). which was abolished in 2022. Further, amendments in 2018 granted the right to vote to those legally incapacitated. The Congress of Deputies has a minimum of 300 and a maximum of 400 seats, with electoral provisions fixing its size at 350. Of these, 348 are elected in 50 multi-member constituencies corresponding to the provinces of Spain—each of which is assigned an initial minimum of two seats and the remaining 248 distributed in proportion to population—using the D'Hondt method and closed-list proportional voting, with a three percent-threshold of valid votes (including blank ballots) in each constituency. The remaining two seats are allocated to Ceuta and Melilla as single-member districts elected by plurality voting. The use of this electoral method may result in a higher effective threshold depending on district magnitude and vote distribution. The law does not provide for by-elections to fill vacant seats; instead, any vacancies arising after the proclamation of candidates and during the legislative term are filled by the next candidates on the party lists or, when required, by designated substitutes.

The electoral law allows for parties and federations registered in the interior ministry, alliances and groupings of electors to present lists of candidates. Parties and federations intending to form an alliance are required to inform the relevant electoral commission within 10 days of the election call—15 before 1985—whereas groupings of electors need to secure the signature of at least one percent of the electorate in the constituencies for which they seek election—one permille of the electorate, with a compulsory minimum of 500 signatures, until 1985—disallowing electors from signing for more than one list. Also since 2011, parties, federations or alliances that have not obtained a mandate in either chamber of the Cortes at the preceding election are required to secure the signature of at least 0.1 percent of electors in the aforementioned constituencies. Amendments in 2007 required a balanced composition of men and women in the electoral lists, so that candidates of either sex made up at least 40 percent of the total composition; further amendments in 2024 required the use of a zipper system.

== Deputies ==
Deputies 1977–present
Key to parties U.Podemos Podemos PSOE PRC Cs UCD PP CP AP Vox
Legislature	Election	Distribution
Constituent	1977	1 / 3 / 1
1st	1979	2 / 3
2nd	1982	3 / 2
3rd	1986	3 / 2
4th	1989	3 / 2
5th	1993	3 / 2
6th	1996	2 / 3
7th	2000	2 / 3
8th	2004	2 / 3
9th	2008	2 / 3
10th	2011	1 / 4
11th	2015	1 / 1 / 1 / 2
12th	2016	1 / 1 / 1 / 2
13th	2019 (Apr)	2 / 1 / 1 / 1
14th	2019 (Nov)	1 / 1 / 2 / 1
15th	2023	2 / 2 / 1

== General elections ==
=== 2026 ===
Summary of the 29 November 2026 Congress of Deputies election results in Cantabria
Parties and alliances	Popular vote			Seats	
Parties and alliances	Votes	%	±pp	Total	+/−
People's Party (PP)					
Spanish Socialist Workers' Party (PSOE)					
Vox (Vox)					
Broad Front (FA)^{1}			n/a		
We Can (Podemos)^{1}			n/a		
Workers' Front (FO)					
Communist Party of the Workers of Spain (PCTE)					
Blank ballots					
Total				5	±0
Valid votes					
Invalid votes					
Votes cast / turnout					
Abstentions					
Registered voters	523,083				
Sources
Footnotes: ^{1} Within the Unite alliance in the 2023 election.

=== 2023 ===
Summary of the 23 July 2023 Congress of Deputies election results in Cantabria
Parties and alliances	Popular vote			Seats	
Parties and alliances	Votes	%	±pp	Total	+/−
People's Party (PP)	147,326	42.08	+16.22	2	±0
Spanish Socialist Workers' Party (PSOE)	116,596	33.30	+10.06	2	+1
Vox (Vox)	49,243	14.06	–0.87	1	±0
Unite (Sumar)^{1}	29,713	8.49	–0.19	0	±0
Animalist Party with the Environment (PACMA)^{2}	2,089	0.60	+0.03	0	±0
Workers' Front (FO)	790	0.23	New	0	±0
Communist Party of the Workers of Spain (PCTE)	598	0.17	+0.09	0	±0
Zero Cuts (Recortes Cero)	533	0.15	+0.08	0	±0
Regionalist Party of Cantabria (PRC)	n/a	n/a	–21.04	0	–1
Blank ballots	3,262	0.93	+0.42		
Total	350,150			5	±0
Valid votes	350,150	98.59	–0.58		
Invalid votes	4,995	1.41	+0.58		
Votes cast / turnout	355,145	69.94	+4.20		
Abstentions	152,673	30.06	–4.20		
Registered voters	507,818				
Sources
Footnotes: ^{1} Unite results are compared to United We Can totals in the November 2019 election.; ^{2} Animalist Party with the Environment results are compared to Animalist Party Against Mistreatment of Animals totals in the November 2019 election.

=== November 2019 ===
Summary of the 10 November 2019 Congress of Deputies election results in Cantabria
Parties and alliances	Popular vote			Seats	
Parties and alliances	Votes	%	±pp	Total	+/−
People's Party (PP)	84,583	25.86	+4.17	2	+1
Spanish Socialist Workers' Party (PSOE)	76,028	23.24	–1.97	1	–1
Regionalist Party of Cantabria (PRC)	68,830	21.04	+6.49	1	±0
Vox (Vox)	48,827	14.93	+3.75	1	+1
United We Can (Podemos–IU)	28,376	8.68	–1.56	0	±0
Citizens–Party of the Citizenry (Cs)	15,609	4.77	–10.37	0	–1
Animalist Party Against Mistreatment of Animals (PACMA)	1,856	0.57	–0.28	0	±0
Communist Party of the Peoples of Spain (PCPE)	262	0.08	±0.00	0	±0
Blank Seats (EB)	259	0.08	–0.04	0	±0
Communist Party of the Workers of Spain (PCTE)	247	0.08	+0.01	0	±0
Zero Cuts–Green Group (Recortes Cero–GV)	232	0.07	–0.02	0	±0
For a Fairer World (PUM+J)	187	0.06	–0.02	0	±0
Libertarian Party (P–LIB)	126	0.04	–0.01	0	±0
Blank ballots	1,667	0.51	–0.13		
Total	327,089			5	±0
Valid votes	327,089	99.17	+0.22		
Invalid votes	2,732	0.83	–0.22		
Votes cast / turnout	329,821	65.74	–6.64		
Abstentions	171,855	34.26	+6.64		
Registered voters	501,676				

=== April 2019 ===
Summary of the 28 April 2019 Congress of Deputies election results in Cantabria
Parties and alliances	Popular vote			Seats	
Parties and alliances	Votes	%	±pp	Total	+/−
Spanish Socialist Workers' Party (PSOE)	90,534	25.21	+1.69	2	+1
People's Party (PP)	77,902	21.69	–19.86	1	–1
Citizens–Party of the Citizenry (Cs)	54,361	15.14	+0.74	1	±0
Regionalist Party of Cantabria (PRC)	52,266	14.55	New	1	+1
Vox (Vox)	40,139	11.18	+10.97	0	±0
United We Can (Podemos–IU–Equo)	36,784	10.24	–7.49	0	–1
Animalist Party Against Mistreatment of Animals (PACMA)	3,049	0.85	–0.15	0	±0
Blank Seats (EB)	427	0.12	–0.06	0	±0
Zero Cuts–Green Group (Recortes Cero–GV)	332	0.09	–0.05	0	±0
Communist Party of the Peoples of Spain (PCPE)	286	0.08	–0.06	0	±0
For a Fairer World (PUM+J)	274	0.08	New	0	±0
Communist Party of the Workers of Spain (PCTE)	260	0.07	New	0	±0
Libertarian Party (P–LIB)	187	0.05	+0.01	0	±0
Blank ballots	2,303	0.64	–0.09		
Total	359,104			5	±0
Valid votes	359,104	98.95	+0.06		
Invalid votes	3,806	1.05	–0.06		
Votes cast / turnout	362,910	72.38	+3.86		
Abstentions	138,501	27.62	–3.86		
Registered voters	501,411				

=== 2016 ===
Summary of the 26 June 2016 Congress of Deputies election results in Cantabria
Parties and alliances	Popular vote			Seats	
Parties and alliances	Votes	%	±pp	Total	+/−
People's Party (PP)	140,252	41.55	+4.64	2	±0
Spanish Socialist Workers' Party (PSOE)	79,407	23.52	+1.11	1	±0
United We Can (Podemos–IU–Equo)^{1}	59,845	17.73	–4.56	1	±0
Citizens–Party of the Citizenry (C's)	48,626	14.40	–0.85	1	±0
Animalist Party Against Mistreatment of Animals (PACMA)	3,369	1.00	+0.16	0	±0
Union, Progress and Democracy (UPyD)	1,051	0.31	–0.51	0	±0
Vox (Vox)	713	0.21	–0.05	0	±0
Blank Seats (EB)	596	0.18	New	0	±0
Zero Cuts–Green Group (Recortes Cero–GV)	483	0.14	–0.01	0	±0
Communist Party of the Peoples of Spain (PCPE)	468	0.14	+0.01	0	±0
Internationalist Solidarity and Self-Management (SAIn)	156	0.05	±0.00	0	±0
Libertarian Party (P–LIB)	147	0.04	New	0	±0
Blank ballots	2,454	0.73	–0.08		
Total	337,567			5	±0
Valid votes	337,567	98.89	–0.01		
Invalid votes	3,781	1.11	+0.01		
Votes cast / turnout	341,348	68.52	–2.45		
Abstentions	156,855	31.48	+2.45		
Registered voters	498,203				
Sources
Footnotes: ^{1} Unidos Podemos results are compared to the combined totals of Podemos and United Left–Popular Unity in Common in the 2015 election.

=== 2015 ===
Summary of the 20 December 2015 Congress of Deputies election results in Cantabria
Parties and alliances	Popular vote			Seats	
Parties and alliances	Votes	%	±pp	Total	+/−
People's Party (PP)	129,216	36.91	–15.26	2	–2
Spanish Socialist Workers' Party (PSOE)	78,460	22.41	–2.82	1	±0
We Can (Podemos)	62,569	17.87	New	1	+1
Citizens–Party of the Citizenry (C's)	53,371	15.25	New	1	+1
United Left–Popular Unity in Common (IU–UPeC)	15,488	4.42	+0.83	0	±0
Animalist Party Against Mistreatment of Animals (PACMA)	2,943	0.84	+0.49	0	±0
Union, Progress and Democracy (UPyD)	2,875	0.82	–2.77	0	±0
Vox (Vox)	901	0.26	New	0	±0
Zero Cuts–Green Group (Recortes Cero–GV)	529	0.15	New	0	±0
Communist Party of the Peoples of Spain (PCPE)	461	0.13	–0.03	0	±0
Humanist Party (PH)	236	0.07	–0.01	0	±0
Internationalist Solidarity and Self-Management (SAIn)	173	0.05	–0.03	0	±0
Blank ballots	2,849	0.81	–0.37		
Total	350,071			5	±0
Valid votes	350,071	98.90	+0.04		
Invalid votes	3,904	1.10	–0.04		
Votes cast / turnout	353,975	70.97	–0.59		
Abstentions	144,796	29.03	+0.59		
Registered voters	498,771				

=== 2011 ===
Summary of the 20 November 2011 Congress of Deputies election results in Cantabria
Parties and alliances	Popular vote			Seats	
Parties and alliances	Votes	%	±pp	Total	+/−
People's Party (PP)	183,244	52.17	+2.18	4	+1
Spanish Socialist Workers' Party (PSOE)	88,624	25.23	–18.38	1	–1
Regionalist Party of Cantabria (PRC)	44,010	12.53	New	0	±0
Union, Progress and Democracy (UPyD)	12,614	3.59	+2.21	0	±0
United Left of Cantabria: Plural Left (IUC)	12,608	3.59	+1.32	0	±0
Equo (Equo)	2,482	0.71	New	0	±0
Animalist Party Against Mistreatment of Animals (PACMA)	1,232	0.35	+0.16	0	±0
Communist Party of the Peoples of Spain (PCPE)	578	0.16	+0.03	0	±0
Enough is Enough, Open Grouping of Political Parties (Basta Ya)	380	0.11	New	0	±0
Anti-capitalists (Anticapitalistas)	354	0.10	New	0	±0
Republicans (RPS)	277	0.08	New	0	±0
Humanist Party (PH)	275	0.08	+0.03	0	±0
Internationalist Solidarity and Self-Management (SAIn)	269	0.08	+0.02	0	±0
Communist Unification of Spain (UCE)	145	0.04	New	0	±0
Blank ballots	4,157	1.18	–0.05		
Total	351,249			5	±0
Valid votes	351,249	98.86	–0.35		
Invalid votes	4,040	1.14	+0.35		
Votes cast / turnout	355,289	71.56	–4.82		
Abstentions	141,194	28.44	+4.82		
Registered voters	496,483				

=== 2008 ===
Summary of the 9 March 2008 Congress of Deputies election results in Cantabria
Parties and alliances	Popular vote			Seats	
Parties and alliances	Votes	%	±pp	Total	+/−
People's Party (PP)	184,853	49.99	–1.91	3	±0
Spanish Socialist Workers' Party (PSOE)	161,279	43.61	+2.74	2	±0
United Left (IU)	8,395	2.27	–1.04	0	±0
Union, Progress and Democracy (UPyD)	5,094	1.38	New	0	±0
The Greens of Europe (LVdE)	1,060	0.29	New	0	±0
Anti-Bullfighting Party Against Mistreatment of Animals (PACMA)	713	0.19	New	0	±0
Communist Party of the Peoples of Spain (PCPE)	497	0.13	+0.01	0	±0
Social Democratic Party (PSD)	444	0.12	New	0	±0
Engine and Sports Alternative (AMD)	394	0.11	New	0	±0
For a Fairer World (PUM+J)	353	0.10	New	0	±0
Alternative in Blank (ABLA)	305	0.08	New	0	±0
Spanish Phalanx of the CNSO (FE de las JONS)	302	0.08	+0.02	0	±0
Citizens for Blank Votes (CenB)	297	0.08	–0.28	0	±0
Citizens–Party of the Citizenry (C's)	286	0.08	New	0	±0
Internationalist Solidarity and Self-Management (SAIn)	219	0.06	New	0	±0
Humanist Party (PH)	175	0.05	–0.14	0	±0
Family and Life Party (PFyV)	166	0.04	New	0	±0
Spanish Alternative (AES)	157	0.04	New	0	±0
National Democracy (DN)	154	0.04	–0.02	0	±0
Authentic Phalanx (FA)	112	0.03	–0.01	0	±0
Blank ballots	4,551	1.23	–1.02		
Total	369,806			5	±0
Valid votes	369,806	99.21	+0.09		
Invalid votes	2,926	0.79	–0.09		
Votes cast / turnout	372,732	76.38	–0.85		
Abstentions	115,277	23.62	+0.85		
Registered voters	488,009				

=== 2004 ===
Summary of the 14 March 2004 Congress of Deputies election results in Cantabria
Parties and alliances	Popular vote			Seats	
Parties and alliances	Votes	%	±pp	Total	+/−
People's Party (PP)	190,383	51.90	–4.94	3	±0
Spanish Socialist Workers' Party (PSOE)	149,906	40.87	+7.40	2	±0
United Left (IU)	12,146	3.31	–1.71	0	±0
Cantabrian Nationalist Council (CNC)	1,431	0.39	–0.24	0	±0
Citizens for Blank Votes (CenB)	1,326	0.36	New	0	±0
Democratic and Social Centre (CDS)	896	0.24	+0.02	0	±0
Humanist Party (PH)	694	0.19	+0.08	0	±0
Republican Social Movement (MSR)	500	0.14	New	0	±0
Communist Party of the Peoples of Spain (PCPE)	431	0.12	–0.04	0	±0
Spanish Phalanx of the CNSO (FE de las JONS)^{1}	209	0.06	±0.00	0	±0
National Democracy (DN)	204	0.06	New	0	±0
The Phalanx (FE)	167	0.05	–0.04	0	±0
Authentic Phalanx (FA)	140	0.04	New	0	±0
Carlist Party (PC)	126	0.03	New	0	±0
Blank ballots	8,267	2.25	–0.37		
Total	366,826			5	±0
Valid votes	366,826	99.12	+0.08		
Invalid votes	3,244	0.88	–0.08		
Votes cast / turnout	370,070	77.23	+5.42		
Abstentions	109,119	22.77	–5.42		
Registered voters	479,189				
Sources
Footnotes: ^{1} Spanish Phalanx of the CNSO results are compared to Independent Spanish Phalanx–Phalanx 2000 totals in the 2000 election.

=== 2000 ===
Summary of the 12 March 2000 Congress of Deputies election results in Cantabria
Parties and alliances	Popular vote			Seats	
Parties and alliances	Votes	%	±pp	Total	+/−
People's Party (PP)	189,442	56.84	+6.37	3	±0
Spanish Socialist Workers' Party–Progressives (PSOE–p)	111,556	33.47	–2.14	2	±0
United Left (IU)	16,714	5.02	–6.34	0	±0
Cantabrian Nationalist Council (CNC)	2,103	0.63	New	0	±0
Liberal Independent Group (GIL)	1,343	0.40	New	0	±0
Centrist Union–Democratic and Social Centre (UC–CDS)	743	0.22	–0.18	0	±0
Natural Law Party (PLN)	598	0.18	New	0	±0
Communist Party of the Peoples of Spain (PCPE)	536	0.16	–0.02	0	±0
Humanist Party (PH)	353	0.11	–0.06	0	±0
Internationalist Socialist Workers' Party (POSI)	328	0.10	New	0	±0
The Phalanx (FE)	293	0.09	New	0	±0
Independent Spanish Phalanx–Phalanx 2000 (FEI–FE 2000)	194	0.06	New	0	±0
Spain 2000 Platform (ES2000)	183	0.05	New	0	±0
Spanish Democratic Party (PADE)	156	0.05	New	0	±0
Blank ballots	8,726	2.62	+1.02		
Total	333,268			5	±0
Valid votes	333,268	99.04	–0.25		
Invalid votes	3,240	0.96	+0.25		
Votes cast / turnout	336,508	71.81	–7.50		
Abstentions	132,099	28.19	+7.50		
Registered voters	468,607				

=== 1996 ===
Summary of the 3 March 1996 Congress of Deputies election results in Cantabria
Parties and alliances	Popular vote			Seats	
Parties and alliances	Votes	%	±pp	Total	+/−
People's Party (PP)	175,651	50.47	+13.44	3	+1
Spanish Socialist Workers' Party (PSOE)	123,940	35.61	–1.56	2	–1
United Left (IU)	39,541	11.36	+3.94	0	±0
Centrist Union (UC)	1,408	0.40	–1.14	0	±0
Communist Party of the Peoples of Spain (PCPE)	640	0.18	+0.02	0	±0
Humanist Party (PH)	608	0.17	+0.10	0	±0
Workers' Revolutionary Party (PRT)^{1}	377	0.11	–0.11	0	±0
Republican Action (AR)	257	0.07	+0.02	0	±0
Blank ballots	5,578	1.60	+0.31		
Total	348,000			5	±0
Valid votes	348,000	99.29	+0.10		
Invalid votes	2,477	0.71	–0.10		
Votes cast / turnout	350,477	79.31	+0.33		
Abstentions	91,457	20.69	–0.33		
Registered voters	441,934				
Sources
Footnotes: ^{1} Workers' Revolutionary Party results are compared to Workers' Socialist Party totals in the 1993 election.

=== 1993 ===
Summary of the 6 June 1993 Congress of Deputies election results in Cantabria
Parties and alliances	Popular vote			Seats	
Parties and alliances	Votes	%	±pp	Total	+/−
Spanish Socialist Workers' Party (PSOE)	122,418	37.17	–2.90	3	±0
People's Party (PP)	121,967	37.03	–1.38	2	±0
Union for the Progress of Cantabria (UPCA)	27,005	8.20	New	0	±0
United Left (IU)	24,453	7.42	+1.02	0	±0
Regionalist Party of Cantabria (PRC)	18,608	5.65	New	0	±0
Democratic and Social Centre (CDS)	5,081	1.54	–8.19	0	±0
The Greens (LV)	1,777	0.54	–0.08	0	±0
The Ecologists (LE)	855	0.26	–0.57	0	±0
Workers' Socialist Party (PST)	729	0.22	–0.36	0	±0
Ruiz-Mateos Group–European Democratic Alliance (ARM–ADE)	557	0.17	–0.57	0	±0
Communist Party of the Peoples of Spain (PCPE)	537	0.16	–0.22	0	±0
Nationalist Party of Cantabria (PNC)	383	0.00	New	0	±0
Humanist Party (PH)	239	0.07	–0.05	0	±0
Natural Law Party (PLN)	184	0.06	New	0	±0
Spanish Democratic Republican Action (ARDE)	152	0.05	New	0	±0
Coalition for a New Socialist Party (CNPS)^{1}	147	0.04	–0.05	0	±0
Communist Unification of Spain (UCE)	0	0.00	New	0	±0
Blank ballots	4,252	1.29	+0.36		
Total	329,344			5	±0
Valid votes	329,344	99.19	+0.27		
Invalid votes	2,675	0.81	–0.27		
Votes cast / turnout	332,019	78.98	+4.70		
Abstentions	88,357	21.02	–4.70		
Registered voters	420,376				
Sources
Footnotes: ^{1} Coalition for a New Socialist Party results are compared to Alliance for the Republic totals in the 1989 election.

=== 1989 ===
Summary of the 29 October 1989 Congress of Deputies election results in Cantabria
Parties and alliances	Popular vote			Seats	
Parties and alliances	Votes	%	±pp	Total	+/−
Spanish Socialist Workers' Party (PSOE)	119,352	40.07	–4.26	3	±0
People's Party (PP)^{1}	114,403	38.41	+4.35	2	±0
Democratic and Social Centre (CDS)	28,976	9.73	–3.23	0	±0
United Left (IU)	19,058	6.40	+3.31	0	±0
The Ecologist Greens (LVE)	2,481	0.83	New	0	±0
Ruiz-Mateos Group (Ruiz-Mateos)	2,208	0.74	New	0	±0
The Greens (LV)	1,860	0.62	New	0	±0
Workers' Socialist Party (PST)	1,727	0.58	–0.01	0	±0
Workers' Party of Spain–Communist Unity (PTE–UC)^{2}	1,291	0.43	–0.83	0	±0
Communist Party of the Peoples of Spain (PCPE)	1,132	0.38	New	0	±0
Radicals for Cantabria (RxC)	904	0.30	New	0	±0
Spanish Phalanx of the CNSO (FE–JONS)	868	0.29	–0.23	0	±0
Humanist Party (PH)	347	0.12	New	0	±0
Alliance for the Republic (AxR)^{3}	256	0.09	–0.18	0	±0
Asturianist Party (PAS)	186	0.06	New	0	±0
Blank ballots	2,824	0.95	+0.14		
Total	297,873			5	±0
Valid votes	297,873	98.92	+0.99		
Invalid votes	3,245	1.08	–0.99		
Votes cast / turnout	301,118	74.28	+0.85		
Abstentions	104,263	25.72	–0.85		
Registered voters	405,381				
Sources
Footnotes: ^{1} People's Party results are compared to People's Coalition totals in the 1986 election.; ^{2} Workers' Party of Spain–Communist Unity results are compared to Communists' Unity Board totals in the 1986 election.; ^{3} Alliance for the Republic results are compared to Internationalist Socialist Workers' Party totals in the 1986 election.

=== 1986 ===
Summary of the 22 June 1986 Congress of Deputies election results in Cantabria
Parties and alliances	Popular vote			Seats	
Parties and alliances	Votes	%	±pp	Total	+/−
Spanish Socialist Workers' Party (PSOE)	129,041	44.33	–0.67	3	±0
People's Coalition (AP–PDP–PL)^{1}	99,149	34.06	–4.85	2	±0
Democratic and Social Centre (CDS)	37,710	12.96	+7.90	0	±0
United Left (IU)^{2}	8,997	3.09	+0.02	0	±0
Democratic Reformist Party (PRD)	3,866	1.33	New	0	±0
Communists' Unity Board (MUC)	3,664	1.26	New	0	±0
Workers' Socialist Party (PST)	1,713	0.59	+0.01	0	±0
Spanish Phalanx of the CNSO (FE–JONS)	1,503	0.52	New	0	±0
Republican Popular Unity (UPR)	988	0.34	New	0	±0
Communist Unification of Spain (UCE)	948	0.33	+0.19	0	±0
Internationalist Socialist Workers' Party (POSI)	783	0.27	New	0	±0
Party of the Communists of Catalonia (PCC)	331	0.11	New	0	±0
Blank ballots	2,371	0.81	+0.22		
Total	291,064			5	±0
Valid votes	291,064	97.93	+0.90		
Invalid votes	6,164	2.07	–0.90		
Votes cast / turnout	297,228	73.43	–9.24		
Abstentions	107,529	26.57	+9.24		
Registered voters	404,757				
Sources
Footnotes: ^{1} People's Coalition results are compared to People's Alliance–People's Democratic Party totals in the 1982 election.; ^{2} United Left results are compared to Communist Party of Spain totals in the 1982 election.

=== 1982 ===
Summary of the 28 October 1982 Congress of Deputies election results in Cantabria
Parties and alliances	Popular vote			Seats	
Parties and alliances	Votes	%	±pp	Total	+/−
Spanish Socialist Workers' Party (PSOE)	135,987	45.00	+14.72	3	+1
People's Alliance–People's Democratic Party (AP–PDP)^{1}	117,567	38.91	+28.61	2	+2
Union of the Democratic Centre (UCD)	16,265	5.38	–36.48	0	–3
Democratic and Social Centre (CDS)	15,281	5.06	New	0	±0
Communist Party of Spain (PCE)	9,265	3.07	–3.54	0	±0
Workers' Socialist Party (PST)	1,760	0.58	New	0	±0
New Force (FN)^{2}	1,716	0.57	–3.33	0	±0
Falangist Mountain Unity–Falangist Movement of Spain (UFM–MFE)	827	0.27	+0.02	0	±0
Spanish Solidarity (SE)	642	0.21	New	0	±0
Communist Unification of Spain (UCE)	421	0.14	New	0	±0
Communist Unity Candidacy (CUC)	404	0.13	New	0	±0
Communist League–Internationalist Socialist Workers' Coalition (LC (COSI))	262	0.09	New	0	±0
Socialist Party (PS)^{3}	0	0.00	–1.44	0	±0
Revolutionary Communist League (LCR)	0	0.00	–0.29	0	±0
Spanish Phalanx of the CNSO (FE–JONS)	0	0.00	New	0	±0
Blank ballots	1,768	0.59	+0.14		
Total	302,165			5	±0
Valid votes	302,165	97.03	–0.95		
Invalid votes	9,250	2.97	+0.95		
Votes cast / turnout	311,415	82.67	+12.22		
Abstentions	65,297	17.33	–12.22		
Registered voters	376,712				
Sources
Footnotes: ^{1} People's Alliance–People's Democratic Party results are compared to Right Independent Group totals in the 1979 election.; ^{2} New Force results are compared to National Union totals in the 1979 election.; ^{3} Socialist Party results are compared to Spanish Socialist Workers' Party (historical) totals in the 1979 election.

=== 1979 ===
Summary of the 1 March 1979 Congress of Deputies election results in Santander
Parties and alliances	Popular vote			Seats	
Parties and alliances	Votes	%	±pp	Total	+/−
Union of the Democratic Centre (UCD)	108,552	41.86	+1.80	3	±0
Spanish Socialist Workers' Party (PSOE)^{1}	78,512	30.28	+1.21	2	+1
Right Independent Group (AID)^{2}	26,707	10.30	–3.97	0	–1
Communist Party of Spain (PCE)	17,140	6.61	+1.16	0	±0
National Union (UN)^{3}	10,106	3.90	+2.50	0	±0
Party of Labour of Spain (PTE)^{4}	4,014	1.55	+0.91	0	±0
Spanish Socialist Workers' Party (historical) (PSOEh)	3,735	1.44	–2.04	0	±0
Workers' Revolutionary Organization (ORT)^{5}	3,267	1.26	+0.27	0	±0
Spanish Phalanx of the CNSO (Authentic) (FE–JONS(A))	1,387	0.53	–0.08	0	±0
Carlist Party (PC)	1,013	0.39	New	0	±0
Communist Movement–Organization of Communist Left (MC–OIC)	872	0.34	New	0	±0
Communist Organization of Spain (Red Flag) (OCE–BR)	772	0.30	New	0	±0
Revolutionary Communist League (LCR)	752	0.29	New	0	±0
Spanish Phalanx–Falangist Unity (FE–UF)	660	0.25	New	0	±0
Republican Left (IR)	643	0.25	New	0	±0
Blank ballots	1,175	0.45	+0.30		
Total	259,307			5	±0
Valid votes	259,307	97.98	+0.86		
Invalid votes	5,351	2.02	–0.86		
Votes cast / turnout	264,658	70.45	–10.28		
Abstentions	111,008	29.55	+10.28		
Registered voters	375,666				
Sources
Footnotes: ^{1} Spanish Socialist Workers' Party results are compared to the combined totals of Spanish Socialist Workers' Party and People's Socialist Party–Socialist Unity in the 1977 election.; ^{2} Right Independent Group results are compared to People's Alliance totals in the 1977 election.; ^{3} National Union results are compared to National Alliance July 18 totals in the 1977 election.; ^{4} Party of Labour of Spain results are compared to Democratic Left Front totals in the 1977 election.; ^{5} Workers' Revolutionary Organization results are compared to Workers' Electoral Group totals in the 1977 election.

=== 1977 ===
Summary of the 15 June 1977 Congress of Deputies election results in Santander
Parties and alliances	Popular vote			Seats	
Parties and alliances	Votes	%	±pp	Total	+/−
Union of the Democratic Centre (UCD)	102,719	40.06	n/a	3	n/a
Spanish Socialist Workers' Party (PSOE)	67,611	26.37	n/a	1	n/a
People's Alliance (AP)	36,598	14.27	n/a	1	n/a
Communist Party of Spain (PCE)	13,971	5.45	n/a	0	n/a
Spanish Socialist Workers' Party (historical) (PSOEh)	8,914	3.48	n/a	0	n/a
People's Socialist Party–Socialist Unity (PSP–US)	6,923	2.70	n/a	0	n/a
Federation of Christian Democracy (FPD–ID)	5,930	2.31	n/a	0	n/a
Spanish Democratic Socialist Party (PSDE)	3,786	1.48	n/a	0	n/a
National Alliance July 18 (AN18)	3,582	1.40	n/a	0	n/a
Workers' Electoral Group (AET)	2,551	0.99	n/a	0	n/a
Spanish Phalanx of the CNSO (Authentic) (FE–JONS(A))	1,797	0.70	n/a	0	n/a
Democratic Left Front (FDI)	1,633	0.64	n/a	0	n/a
Blank ballots	391	0.15	n/a		
Total	256,406			5	n/a
Valid votes	256,406	97.12	n/a		
Invalid votes	7,591	2.88	n/a		
Votes cast / turnout	263,997	80.73	n/a		
Abstentions	63,011	19.27	n/a		
Registered voters	327,008				

== Bibliography ==
- Ley 1/1977, de 4 de enero, para la Reforma Política (Fundamental Law 1/1977). Official State Gazette (in Spanish). 4 January 1977. BOE-A-1977-165.
- Real Decreto-ley 20/1977, de 18 de marzo, sobre Normas Electorales (Royal Decree-Law 20/1977). Official State Gazette (in Spanish). 18 March 1977. BOE-A-1977-7445.
- Constitución Española (Constitution). Official State Gazette (in Spanish). 27 December 1978. BOE-A-1978-31229.
- Ley Orgánica 5/1985, de 19 de junio, del Régimen Electoral General (Organic Law 5/1985). Official State Gazette (in Spanish). 19 June 1985. BOE-A-1985-11672.
- Carreras de Odriozola, Albert; Tafunell Sambola, Xavier (2005) [1989]. Estadísticas históricas de España, siglos XIX-XX (PDF) (in Spanish). Vol. 1 (II ed.). Bilbao: Fundación BBVA. pp. 1072–1097. ISBN 84-96515-00-1. Archived from the original (PDF) on 24 September 2015.
