= Government of Cantabria =

Autonomic administration of Cantabria, Spain

- Gobierno de Cantabria

Overview
- Polity: Cantabria
- Leader: President
- Appointed by: King of Spain
- Main organ: Council of Government
- Responsible to: Parliament of Cantabria
- Annual budget: €3.56 billion (2024)
- Headquarters: c/. Peña Herbosa 29, Santander
- Website: www.cantabria.es

The Government of Cantabria is one of the statutory institutions that conform the Autonomous Community of Cantabria. It is the superior collegiate body that directs the politics and the Administration of this Spanish autonomous community, and at the same time the holder of the executive power as well as the regulatory authority over said territory.

== Election ==
Every four years there are the Autonomical Elections, when the electors of Cantabria vote for the political party that they want in government. The members of the elected Parliament of Cantabria must elect the President of Cantabria, and he must elect his counsellors.

== Members of the Government ==
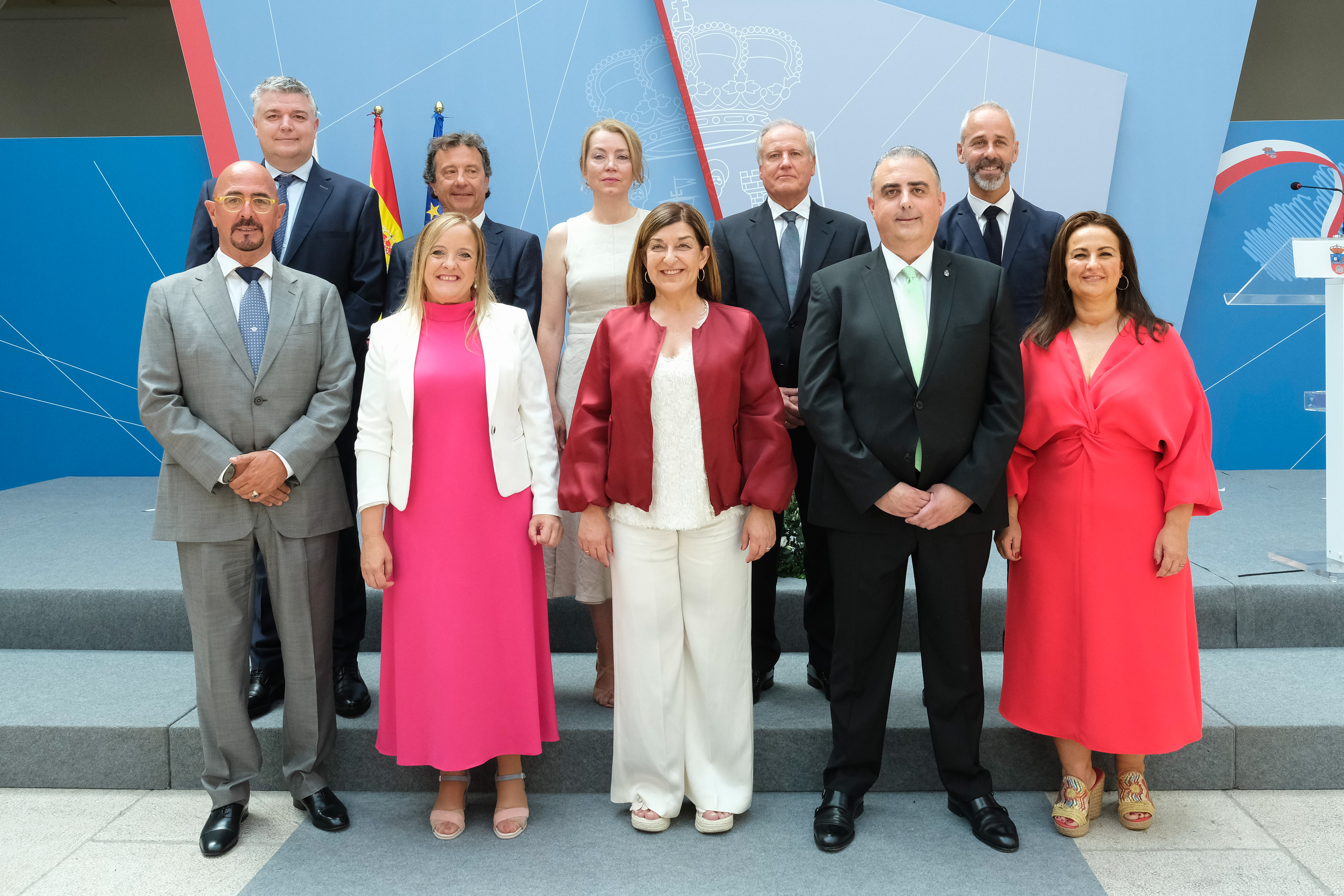
Current Government of Cantabria.

This is the government for the 2023–2027 period. It is a minority People's Party government.

Charge	Name
President of Cantabria	María José Sáenz de Buruaga
Minister of the Presidency, Justice, Security and Administrative Simplification	María Isabel Urrutia de los Mozos
Minister of Public Works, Territory Planning and Environment	Roberto Media Sainz
Minister of Economy, Finance and European Funds	Luis Ángel Agüeros Sánchez
Minister of Education, Vocational Training and Universities	Sergio Silva Fernández
Minister of Culture, Tourism and Sport	Eva Guillermina Fernández Ortiz
Minister of Rural Development, Livestock, Fisheries and Food	Pablo Palencia Garrido-Lestache
Minister of Industry, Labour, Innovation and Commerce	Eduardo Arasti Barca
Minister of Health	César Pascual Fernández
Minister of Social Inclusion, Youth, Families and Equality	Begoña Gómez del Río

== Public Companies ==
Here is a list with the public companies which depend of the Government of Cantabria:

- Cantur
- SICAN
- SODERCAN
- Gesvican
- Puertos de Cantabria
- PCTCAN
- SCS (Servicio Cántabro de Salud)
- MARE (Medio Ambiente, Agua, Residuos y Energía)
