= Hormaechea =

Hormaechea is a surname. Notable people with the surname include:

- Francisco de Lersundi y Hormaechea (1817–1874), Spanish noble and politician
- Juan Hormaechea (1939–2020), Spanish politician
