= Nationalist Party of Cantabria =

Cantabrian Nationalist Party Partido Nacionalista Cántabro
- Leader: Esteban Solana Lavín
- Founded: 1988
- Ideology: Cantabrian nationalism Conservatism; Liberal conservatism
- Political position: Right-wing
- Parliament of Cantabria (1988-1991): 1 / 35
- Town councillors in Cantabria (1988-1991): 3 / 1,042

The Nationalist Party of Cantabria (Spanish: Partido Nacionalista de Cantabria, PNC) was a political party with a nationalist and conservative ideology active in Cantabria between 1988 and the mid 90s.

== History ==
The PNC originated as a split in the Regionalist Party of Cantabria (PRC) in early 1988. After the regional and municipal elections of 1987, the PRC won five seats in the Regional Assembly of Cantabria and two town councilors in the city of Santander. Internal party strife culminated in the abandonment of the organization by the two councilors of Santander (Miguel Pérez Bustamante and Ángel Díaz Ocejo), as well as by the deputy of the Regional Assembly Esteban Solana Lavín. The splinter group founded the PNC. Other politicians would later joining the new nationalist formation (among them the regionalist Santoña councilor José Antonio Solar). The new party was more conservative than the PRC.

During the rest of the legislature, the nationalist deputy was a key element for the governance of the Autonomous Community, giving its support to the 19 deputies of People's Coalition, and thus supporting the Cantabrian president Juan Hormaechea.

In the following regional elections the PNC only gained a 0.21% of the vote, losing its deputy in the Regional Assembly. Given the poor results achieved in these elections and in the elections to the Congress of Deputies of 1993, the party disappeared from the political scene.

== Elections ==
Year	Elections	Votes	%	Seats
1991	Cantabrian parliamentary election, 1991	623	0.21%	0
1991	Spanish municipal elections, 1991	503	0.17%	0
1993	Spanish general election, 1993	383	0.12%	0
