= 1991 Spanish regional elections =

- 26 May 1991

784 seats in the regional parliaments of Aragon, Asturias, Balearic Islands, Canary Islands, Cantabria, Castile and León, Castilla–La Mancha, Extremadura, La Rioja, Madrid, Murcia, Navarre and Valencian Community
Regional administrations after the 1991 regional elections
National parties
PSOE
PP
Regional parties
CiU
EAJ/PNV
PAR
UPCA
UPN (Note: PP's sister party in Navarre.)

Regional elections were held in Spain during 1991 to elect the regional parliaments of thirteen of the seventeen autonomous communities: Aragon, Asturias, the Balearic Islands, the Canary Islands, Cantabria, Castile and León, Castilla–La Mancha, Extremadura, La Rioja, Madrid, Murcia, Navarre and the Valencian Community. 784 of 1,178 seats in the regional parliaments were up for election. The elections were held on 26 May (concurrently with local elections all across the country).

== Election date ==
Determination of election day varied depending on the autonomous community, with each one having competency to establish its own regulations. Typically, thirteen out of the seventeen autonomous communities—all but Andalusia, the Basque Country, Catalonia and Galicia—had their elections fixed for the fourth Sunday of May every four years, to be held together with nationwide local elections.

== Regional governments ==
The following table lists party control in autonomous communities. Gains for a party are highlighted in that party's colour.

Election day	Region	Previous control	New control
26 May	Aragon	Aragonese Party (PAR)	Aragonese Party (PAR) (PSOE in 1993)
26 May	Asturias	Spanish Socialist Workers' Party (PSOE)	Spanish Socialist Workers' Party (PSOE)
26 May	Balearics	People's Party (PP)	People's Party (PP)
26 May	Canary Islands	Democratic and Social Centre (CDS)	Spanish Socialist Workers' Party (PSOE) (CC in 1993)
26 May	Cantabria	Spanish Socialist Workers' Party (PSOE)	Union for the Progress of Cantabria (UPCA)
26 May	Castile and León	People's Party (PP)	People's Party (PP)
26 May	Castilla–La Mancha	Spanish Socialist Workers' Party (PSOE)	Spanish Socialist Workers' Party (PSOE)
26 May	Extremadura	Spanish Socialist Workers' Party (PSOE)	Spanish Socialist Workers' Party (PSOE)
26 May	La Rioja	Spanish Socialist Workers' Party (PSOE)	Spanish Socialist Workers' Party (PSOE)
26 May	Madrid	Spanish Socialist Workers' Party (PSOE)	Spanish Socialist Workers' Party (PSOE)
26 May	Murcia	Spanish Socialist Workers' Party (PSOE)	Spanish Socialist Workers' Party (PSOE)
26 May	Navarre	Spanish Socialist Workers' Party (PSOE)	Navarrese People's Union (UPN)
26 May	Valencian Community	Spanish Socialist Workers' Party (PSOE)	Spanish Socialist Workers' Party (PSOE)

== Summary by region ==
=== May (13 regions) ===
==== Aragon ====
Parties and alliances	Votes	%	±pp	Seats	+/−
PSOE	247,485	40.34	+4.66	30	+3
PAR	151,420	24.68	−3.46	17	−2
PP	126,892	20.68	+3.96	17	+4
CAA–IU	41,367	6.74	+1.84	3	+1
CDS	18,929	3.09	−7.14	0	−6
CHA	14,116	2.30	+1.34	0	±0
Others	5,355	0.87		0	±0
Blank ballots	7,981	1.30	−0.14		
Valid votes	613,545	99.30	+0.50		
Invalid votes	4,303	0.70	−0.50		
Votes cast / turnout	617,848	64.39	−5.31		
Registered voters	959,596				

==== Asturias ====
Parties and alliances	Votes	%	±pp	Seats	+/−
PSOE	218,193	41.02	+2.11	21	+1
PP	161,703	30.40	+4.59	15	+2
IU	78,982	14.85	+2.76	6	+2
CDS	35,884	6.75	−11.77	2	−6
PAS–UNA	14,569	2.74	+1.46	1	+1
LV	7,299	1.37	New	0	±0
Others	8,784	1.65		0	±0
Blank ballots	6,533	1.23	±0.00		
Valid votes	531,947	99.25	+0.65		
Invalid votes	4,020	0.75	−0.65		
Votes cast / turnout	535,967	58.69	−7.89		
Registered voters	913,215				

==== Balearics ====
Parties and alliances	Votes	%	±pp	Seats	+/−
PP–UM	160,512	47.32	+0.04	31	+2
PSIB–PSOE	102,060	30.09	−2.38	21	±0
PSM–NM	22,522	6.64	+1.76	3	+1
PSM–EU	12,395	3.65	+0.13	2	±0
CDS	9,938	2.93	−7.25	0	−5
UIM–IM	8,429	2.49	New	1	+1
EV	7,205	2.12	New	0	±0
CB	5,513	1.63	New	0	±0
FIEF	2,468	0.73	New	1	+1
Others	5,212	1.54		0	±0
Blank ballots	2,934	0.87	−0.18		
Valid votes	339,188	99.38	+0.66		
Invalid votes	2,106	0.62	−0.66		
Votes cast / turnout	341,294	60.27	−6.67		
Registered voters	566,243				

==== Canary Islands ====
Parties and alliances	Votes	%	±pp	Seats	+/−
PSOE	229,692	33.03	+5.26	23	+2
AIC	157,859	22.70	+2.57	16	+5
CDS	100,197	14.41	−5.07	7	−6
PP	89,251	12.83	−0.33	6	±0
ICAN	85,015	12.22	−0.98	5	+1
PNC	7,845	1.13	New	0	±0
AM	4,906	0.71	−0.10	2	−1
AHI	1,485	0.21	±0.00	1	−1
Others	13,888	2.00		0	±0
Blank ballots	5,323	0.77	+0.12		
Valid votes	695,461	99.27	+0.43		
Invalid votes	5,080	0.73	−0.43		
Votes cast / turnout	700,541	61.69	−5.80		
Registered voters	1,135,550				

==== Cantabria ====
Parties and alliances	Votes	%	±pp	Seats	+/−
PSOE	102,958	34.81	+5.24	16	+3
UPCA	99,194	33.53	New	15	+15
PP	42,714	14.44	−29.60	6	−13
PRC	18,789	6.35	−6.51	2	−3
IU	13,023	4.40	+0.79	0	±0
CDS	7,926	2.68	−3.89	0	−2
Others	6,193	2.09		0	±0
Blank ballots	5,009	1.69	+0.57		
Valid votes	295,806	99.15	+0.52		
Invalid votes	2,542	0.85	−0.52		
Votes cast / turnout	298,348	72.34	−3.38		
Registered voters	412,406				

==== Castile and León ====
Parties and alliances	Votes	%	±pp	Seats	+/−
PP	602,773	43.52	+5.23	43	+9
PSOE	504,709	36.44	+2.43	35	+3
CDS	112,821	8.14	−11.23	5	−13
IU	74,197	5.36	+1.55	1	+1
LV	20,193	1.46	New	0	±0
Others	47,486	3.43		0	±0
Blank ballots	23,028	1.66	+0.08		
Valid votes	1,385,207	99.07	+0.79		
Invalid votes	13,031	0.93	−0.79		
Votes cast / turnout	1,398,238	67.57	−5.58		
Registered voters	2,069,469				

==== Castilla–La Mancha ====
Parties and alliances	Votes	%	±pp	Seats	+/−
PSOE	489,876	52.17	+5.84	27	+2
PP	336,642	35.85	−0.07	19	+1
IU	57,967	6.17	+0.81	1	+1
CDS	32,793	3.49	−7.00	0	−4
Others	12,396	1.32		0	±0
Blank ballots	9,300	0.99	+0.01		
Valid votes	938,974	99.24	+0.40		
Invalid votes	7,164	0.76	−0.40		
Votes cast / turnout	946,138	72.50	−2.93		
Registered voters	1,304,996				

==== Extremadura ====
Parties and alliances	Votes	%	±pp	Seats	+/−
PSOE	314,384	54.16	+4.98	39	+5
PP	155,485	26.78	+1.34	19	+2
IU	41,290	7.11	+1.70	4	+2
CDS	33,291	5.73	−6.62	3	−5
EU	14,503	2.50	−3.31	0	−4
PREx	8,660	1.49	New	0	±0
LV	6,011	1.04	New	0	±0
PCPE	2,379	0.41	New	0	±0
Blank ballots	4,508	0.78	−0.02		
Valid votes	580,511	99.34	+0.33		
Invalid votes	3,867	0.66	−0.33		
Votes cast / turnout	584,378	70.85	−3.54		
Registered voters	824,866				

==== La Rioja ====
Parties and alliances	Votes	%	±pp	Seats	+/−
PSOE	60,843	42.37	+2.73	16	+2
PP	59,876	41.70	+3.65	15	+2
PR	7,731	5.38	−1.01	2	±0
IU	6,499	4.53	+2.12	0	±0
CDS	6,271	4.37	−6.47	0	−4
Blank ballots	2,373	1.65	−0.05		
Valid votes	143,593	99.22	+0.59		
Invalid votes	1,136	0.78	−0.59		
Votes cast / turnout	144,729	68.89	−3.61		
Registered voters	210,080				

==== Madrid ====
Parties and alliances	Votes	%	±pp	Seats	+/−
PP	956,865	42.67	+10.88	47	+15
PSOE	820,510	36.59	−1.86	41	+1
IU	270,558	12.07	+4.59	13	+6
CDS	75,081	3.35	−13.28	0	−17
LV	35,095	1.57	+0.49	0	±0
Others	55,363	2.47		0	±0
Blank ballots	28,872	1.29	−0.45		
Valid votes	2,242,344	99.59	+0.81		
Invalid votes	9,269	0.41	−0.81		
Votes cast / turnout	2,251,613	58.67	−11.20		
Registered voters	3,837,680				

==== Murcia ====
Parties and alliances	Votes	%	±pp	Seats	+/−
PSOE	234,421	45.27	+1.56	24	−1
PP	173,491	33.51	+2.01	17	+1
IU	52,863	10.21	+2.76	4	+3
CDS	25,938	5.01	−6.92	0	−3
PCAN–PRM	15,702	3.03	−0.76	0	±0
LV	5,760	1.11	New	0	±0
Others	4,753	0.92		0	±0
Blank ballots	4,853	0.94	−0.02		
Valid votes	517,781	99.04	+0.20		
Invalid votes	5,039	0.96	−0.20		
Votes cast / turnout	522,820	67.18	−5.81		
Registered voters	778,256				

==== Navarre ====
Parties and alliances	Votes	%	±pp	Seats	+/−
UPN	96,005	34.95	−0.01	20	+1
PSN–PSOE	91,645	33.36	+5.68	19	+4
HB	30,762	11.20	−2.26	6	−1
EA	15,170	5.52	−1.48	3	−1
IU	11,167	4.07	+2.73	2	+2
Batzarre	6,543	2.38	+0.31	0	±0
EE	5,824	2.12	−1.27	0	−1
CDS	5,650	2.06	−5.36	0	−4
PAG	3,855	1.40	New	0	±0
EAJ/PNV	3,071	1.12	+0.18	0	±0
PC	1,353	0.49	New	0	±0
Blank ballots	3,637	1.32	−0.07		
Valid votes	274,682	99.24	+0.40		
Invalid votes	2,091	0.76	−0.40		
Votes cast / turnout	276,773	66.71	−6.19		
Registered voters	414,913				

==== Valencian Community ====
Parties and alliances	Votes	%	±pp	Seats	+/−
PSOE	860,429	42.85	+1.57	45	+3
PP	558,617	27.82	+3.11	31	+6
UV	208,126	10.36	+1.22	7	+1
EUPV	151,242	7.53	n/a	6	+2
CDS	76,433	3.81	−7.43	0	−10
UPV	73,813	3.68	n/a	0	−2
LV	35,375	1.76	+0.65	0	±0
Others	23,468	1.17		0	±0
Blank ballots	20,606	1.03	−0.04		
Valid votes	2,008,109	99.44	+0.56		
Invalid votes	11,302	0.56	−0.56		
Votes cast / turnout	2,019,411	69.24	−5.21		
Registered voters	2,916,465				
