= Parliament of Cantabria =

Legislature of the Autonomous Community of Cantabria in Spain

Coordinates: 43°27′35″N 3°48′49″W

Parliament of Cantabria Parlamento de Cantabria
- 10th Parliament of Cantabria
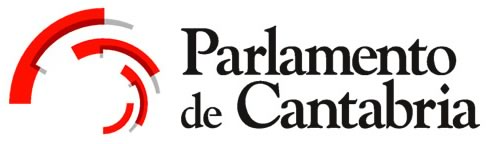

Type
- Type: Spanish regional legislature
- Houses: Unicameral

Structure
- Seats: 35
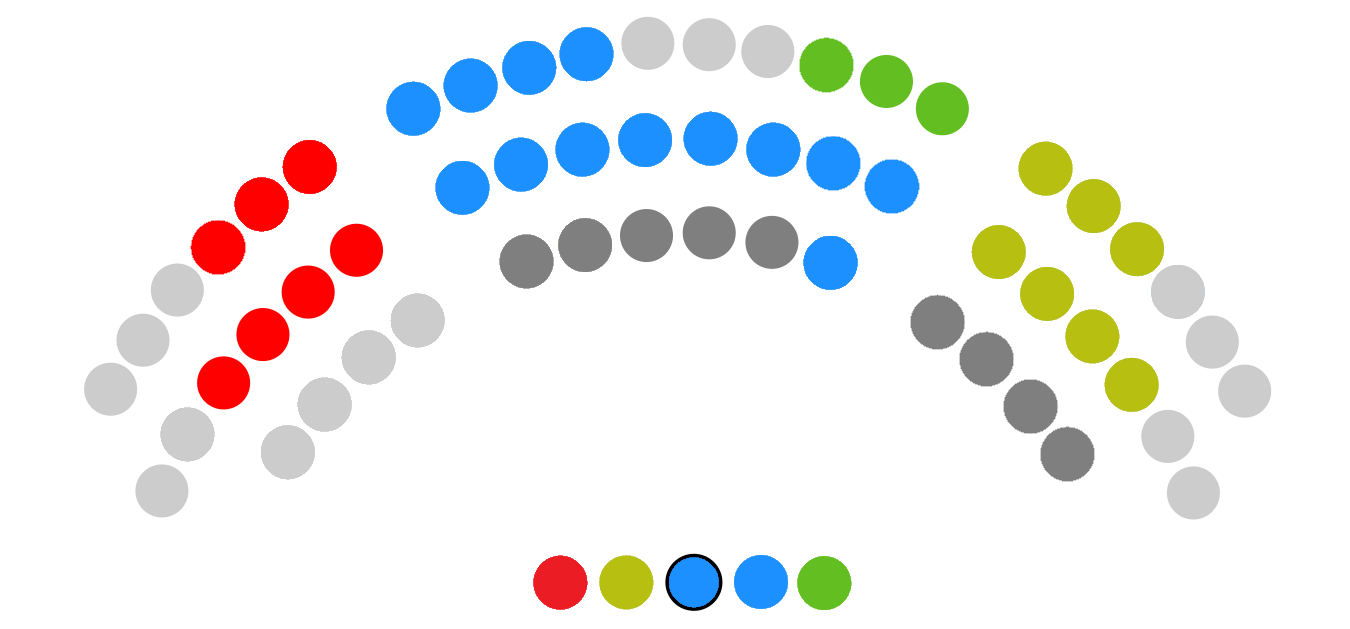
- Political groups: Government (15): PP (15); Opposition (20): PRC (8); PSOE (8); Vox (4)
- Length of term: 4 years

Elections
- Last election: May 28, 2023

Meeting place
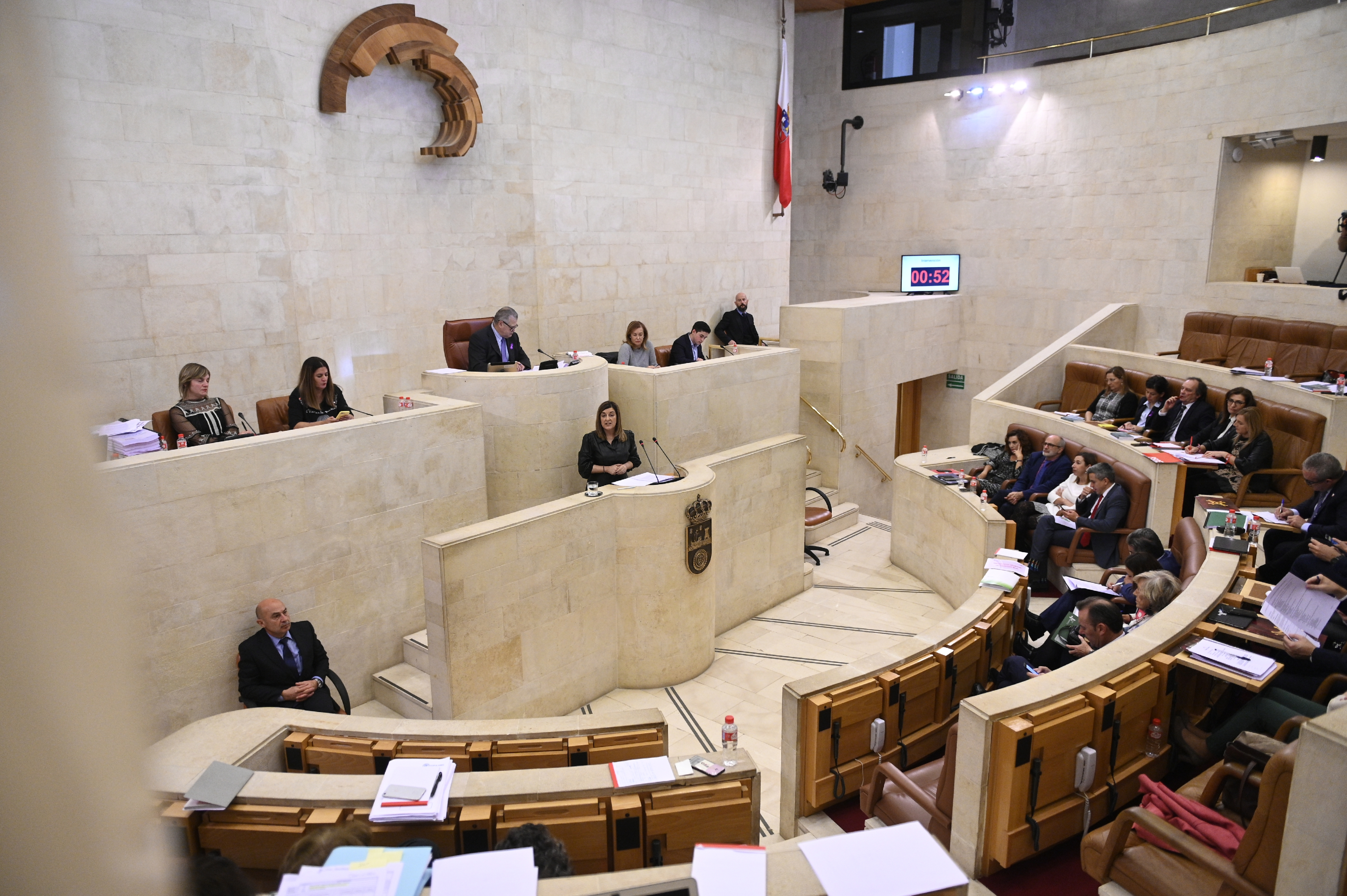
- Hemicycle

Website
- http://www.parlamento-cantabria.es

The Parliament of Cantabria (Spanish: Parlamento de Cantabria) is the unicameral legislature of the autonomous community of Cantabria. It consists of 35 members called "deputies" which are freely elected by the citizens of the region. The Parliament convenes at the Saint Raphael Hospital, an 18th-century building in the city of Santander rehabilitated in the 1980s to house the Regional Assembly.

Prior to 1998, the Parliament was called Regional Assembly of Cantabria.

Following the 2023 Cantabrian regional election, the People's Party has the plurality of seats and is the governing party.

== Elections and voting ==
The number of seats in the Parliament of Cantabria is set to a fixed-number of 35. All Parliament members are elected to a four-year term in a single multi-member district, consisting of the Community's territory (the province of Cantabria), using the D'Hondt method and a closed-list proportional representation system.

Voting is on the basis of universal suffrage in a secret ballot. Only lists polling above 5% of valid votes in all of the community (which include blank ballots—for none of the above) are entitled to enter the seat distribution.

The first elections were held in 1983 when the People's Coalition won a majority of seats and José Antonio Rodríguez became the first regional president. In the 2019 Cantabrian parliamentary election the Regionalist Party of Cantabria won 40% of the seats, needing the Socialist Party to govern.

== Building ==
The building where the Parliament of Cantabria is placed is the old Hospital of Saint Raphael, in the High Street (old district) of Santander, Spain.

The hospital was built in 1791 as a charity hospital for the poor and was the main hospital of Santander. It served during the Independence War and the disaster of the Cabo Machichaco. The hospital closed down in 1928, and in 1982, the regional assembly of Cantabria started the restoration project of the building, which ended in 1984 and won some awards.

== Membership ==
=== Results of the elections to the Parliament of Cantabria ===
The representatives of the Parliament of Cantabria are elected every four years under a system of party-list proportional representation.

Deputies in Regional Assembly of Murcia since 1983
Key to parties Podemos IU PSOE Cs PRC UCLA PP CP AP Vox
Election	Distribution	President
1983	15 / 2 / 18	José A. Rodríguez Martínez (AP)
1987	13 / 5 / 2 / 19	Juan Hormaechea (AP)
1991	16 / 2 / 15 / 6	Juan Hormaechea (UPCA)
1995	3 / 10 / 6 / 7 / 13	José Joaquín Martínez Sieso (PP)
1999	14 / 6 / 9	José Joaquín Martínez Sieso (PP)
2003	13 / 8 / 18	Miguel Ángel Revilla (PRC)
2007	10 / 12 / 17	Miguel Ángel Revilla (PRC)
2011	7 / 12 / 20	Ignacio Diego (PP)
2015	3 / 5 / 12 / 2 / 13	Miguel Ángel Revilla (PRC)
2019	7 / 14 / 3 / 9 / 2	Miguel Ángel Revilla (PRC)
2023	8 / 8 / 15 / 4	María José Sáenz de Buruaga (PP)

== Parliamentary bodies ==
=== Bureau ===
The Bureau of the Parliament of Cantabria is formed by the Speaker of the Parliament, two Deputy Speakers and two Secretaries.

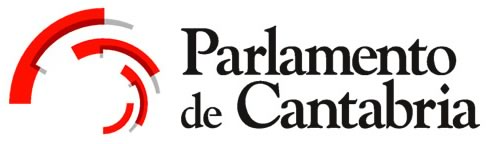
Bureau of the Parliament of Cantabria
Office	Name	Party
Speaker	Joaquín Gómez Gómez	PSC
First Deputy Speaker	Emilia Aguirre Ventosa	PRC
Second Deputy Speaker	María José González Revuelta	PPC
First Secretary	Ana Obregón Abascal	PRC
Second Secretary	Diego Marañón	Citizens

=== Board of Spokespersons ===
The Board of Spokespersons is a parliamentary body consisting of the spokespersons of the parliamentary groups. Its main task is to decide the agenda.

=== Committees ===
The committees are formed by a group of deputies appointed by their respective parliamentary groups. Within them, legislative initiatives are known and discussed before they are debated in Parliament's Plenary.

There are different types of committees. They are called standing committees to those that are expressly established in the Standing Rules of the Parliament. The non-standing committees are created to discuss a specific issue or matter during a legislature.

Each committee elects a bureau consisting of a chair, a deputy chair and a secretary.

As of 2019, there are 12 standing committees. There are no non-standing committees.

Committee	Chair	Deputy chair	Refs
Rural Development, Livestock, Fisheries, Food and Environment	Pablo Diestro Eguren (PRC)	Paz Mercedes de la Cuesta Aguado (PSC)	
Economy and Finance	Lorenzo Vidal de la Peña López-Tormos (PPC)	Paz Mercedes de la Cuesta Aguado (PSC)	
Education, Vocational Training and Tourism	José Miguel Fernández Viadero (PRC)	Paz Mercedes de la Cuesta Aguado (PSC)	
Employment and Social Policies	Javier García-Oliva Mascarós (PSC)	Francisco Ortiz Uriarte (PRC)	
Statute of Deputies	Pedro José Hernando García (PRC)	María José Sáenz de Buruaga Gómez (PPC)	
Innovation, Industry, Transport and Commerce	Ana Obregón Abascal (PRC)	Paz Mercedes de la Cuesta Aguado (PSC)	
Public Works, Territorial Planning and Urbanism	Javier López Estrada (PRC)	Pablo Zuloaga Martínez (PSC)	
Petitions	Joaquín Gómez Gómez (PSC)	Emilia María Aguirre Ventosa (PRC)	
Presidency, Interior, Justice and External Action	Pedro José Hernando García (PRC)	Javier García-Oliva Mascarós (PSC)	
Rules	Joaquín Gómez Gómez (PSC)	Pedro José Hernando García (PRC)	
Health	Paz Mercedes de la Cuesta Aguado (PSC)	María de los Ángeles Matanzas Rodríguez (PRC)	
Universities, Equality, Culture and Sport	Noelia Cobo Pérez (PSC)	María Teresa Noceda Llano (PRC)	

== Transparency ==
The Parliament of Cantabria is one of the most transparent regional parliaments in Spain (98.8%).

All the students of Cantabria go to the Parliament at least once on a school trip, where they meet some deputies and usually the president of the Parliament. They are told about the history of the building, how the Parliament works and how they can participate in democracy. Sessions are retransmitted by the regional television broadcaster Tele Bahía.

== See also ==
- List of presidents of the Parliament of Cantabria
- Eduardo Obregón
