= President of Cantabria =

Head of government in autonomous community of Cantabria

- Coat of arms of Cantabria

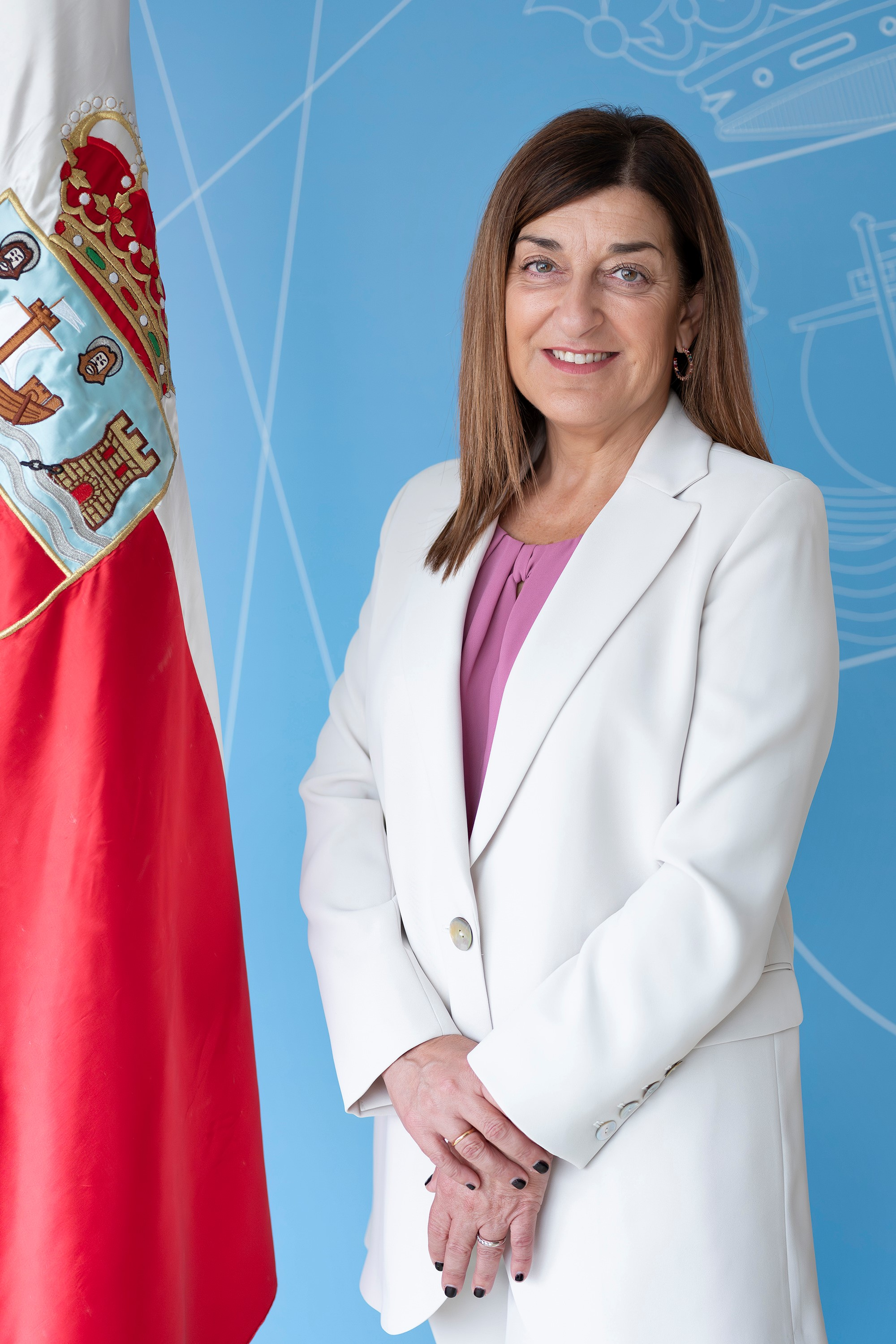
- Incumbent; María José Sáenz de Buruaga since July 5, 2023
- Seat: Santander, Cantabria, Spain
- Nominator: Parliament of Cantabria
- Appointer: The Monarch countersigned by the Prime Minister
- Term length: 4 years. No limits.
- Constituting instrument: Constitution of 1978
- Inaugural holder: José Antonio Rodríguez Martínez
- Formation: 1982
- Website: cantabria.es

The president of Cantabria, according to the Autonomy Statute of Cantabria, presides over the Government of Cantabria, directs its activities, coordinates the administration of the autonomous community, designates and separates the regional ministers, and holds the supreme representation of the autonomous community and ordinary representation of the state in Cantabria. The president is elected by the Parliament of Cantabria among its members, and is appointed by the Monarch.

The Parliament elects him or her by absolute majority in first session or by simple majority in subsequent. Between each session at least forty eight hours have to pass. If two months after the constitution of the Parliament there hasn't been elected a candidate, it is dissolved and there is another call for elections.

== Election and investiture ==
The president of Cantabria is chosen by the Parliament of Cantabria after the regional elections of Cantabria, in which ones, people votes for the political parties that will form the Parliament.

According with the established in the third point of the article 17 of the Organic Law 8/1981, of December 30, of the Statute of Autonomy of Cantabria:

3. The President of the Autonomous Community shall be elected by Parliament from among its members and appointed by the King. To this end, the President of Parliament, after consultation with the political forces represented therein and after hearing the Table of the Parliament, shall propose a candidate or candidate for President of the Autonomous Community. The candidate or candidate will present his program to the House Plenum and, in order to be elected, must obtain an absolute majority in the first voting; If this qualified majority is not obtained, a new voting shall be held after forty-eight hours and shall be elected if it obtains a simple majority. If no such majority is obtained in this second voting, successive proposals will be processed in the form previously foreseen.(...)

— Article 17, Statute of Autonomy of Cantabria

== Functions and powers ==
The functions of the president of Cantabria are established in the articles 17 and 23 of the Organic Law 8/1981, of December 30, of the Statute of Autonomy of Cantabria:

1. The President of the Autonomous Community holds the highest representation of the Autonomous Community and the ordinary state in Cantabria.
2. The President appoints and separates the members of the Government and presides, directs and coordinates their action.

— Article 17, Statute of Autonomy of Cantabria

1. The President, after deliberation of the Government, and under his sole responsibility, may agree on the dissolution of Parliament in anticipation of the natural term of the legislature.

2. The dissolution will be agreed by Decree, in which elections will be called in turn, being contained in the same as the requirements required by the applicable electoral legislation.

3. The President may not agree to the dissolution of Parliament during the first session of the legislature, when less than a year is left for its termination, or when a vote of no confidence is pending. Nor shall it be able to agree on dissolution before one year has elapsed since the last dissolution by this procedure. In no case may the President dissolve Parliament when a state electoral process is called.

— Article 23, Statute of Autonomy of Cantabria

Also, in the second point of the article 22 is given the unique authority to the president of Cantabria to raise a matter of confidence:

2. The President, after deliberation by the Government, may raise before Parliament the question of confidence in his program or in a general policy statement. The trust will be understood granted when you vote in favor of it the simple majority of the Deputies.

— Article 22, Statute of Autonomy of Cantabria

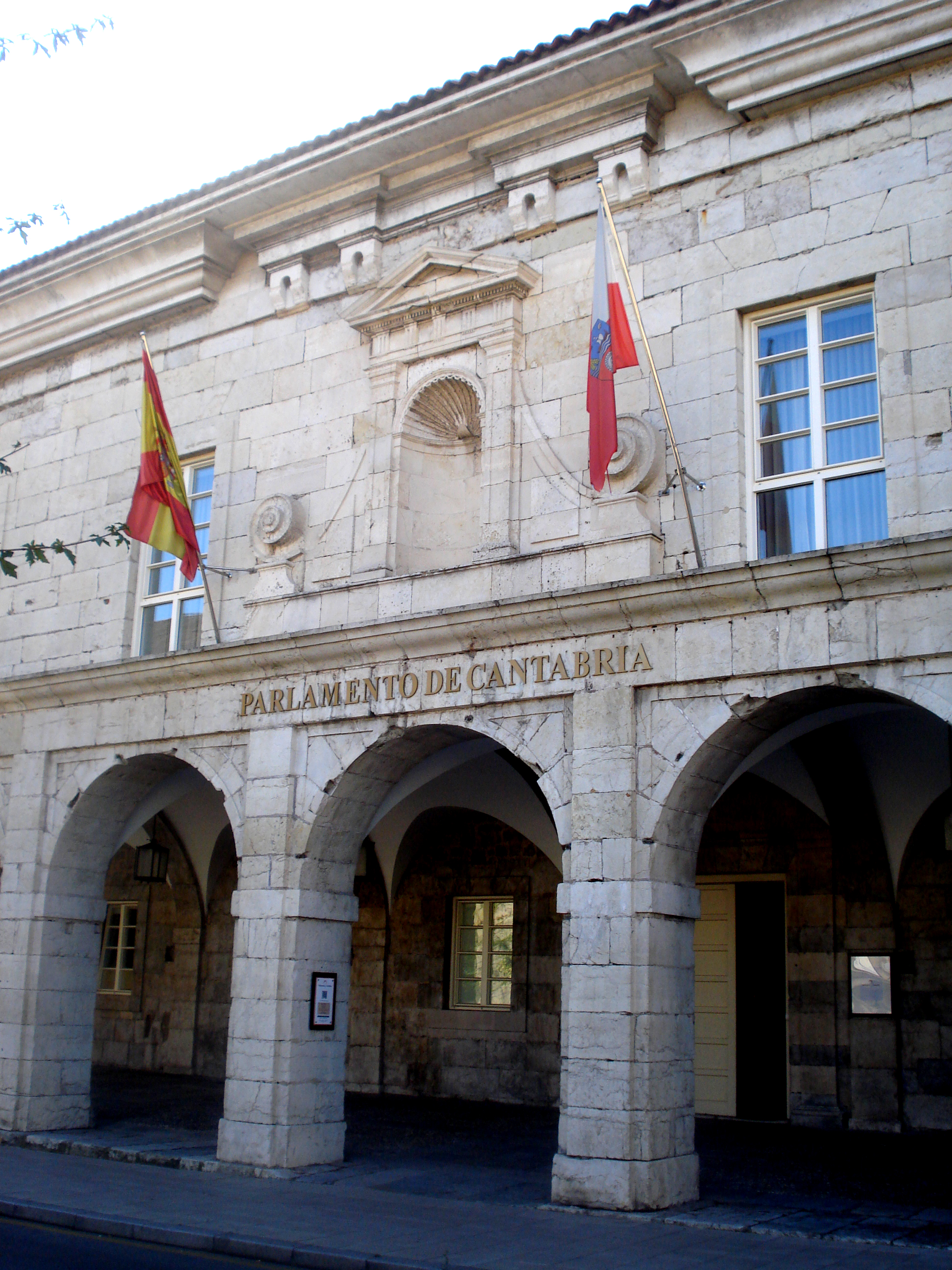
Parliament of Cantabria

== Cessation, matter of confidence and constructive vote of no confidence ==
According to the article 22 of the Organic Law 8/1981, of December 30, of the Statute of Autonomy of Cantabria:

1. The Government of Cantabria will respond politically to the Parliament jointly without prejudice to the direct responsibility of each one of its components.

2. The President, after deliberation by the Government, may raise before Parliament the matter of confidence in his program or in a general policy statement. The trust will be understood granted when you vote in favor of it the simple majority of the Deputies.
3. The Parliament can demand the political responsibility of the President or the Government through the adoption by absolute majority of the constructive vote of no confidence.
4. Should the Parliament deny its confidence, the President of Cantabria will present his resign before the Parliament, the President of which shall convene the plenary session for the election of the new President in accordance with the procedure laid down in Article 17 within a maximum of 15 days.
5. If the Parliament adopts a vote of no confidence, the President will present his resign before the Chamber and the candidate included in it shall be deemed to have the confidence of Parliament. The King will appoint him President of the Autonomous Community.

6. The President may not raise the issue of confidence while a vote of no confidence is pending.

— Article 22, Statute of Autonomy of Cantabria

== List of presidents ==
=== Presidents of Interprovincial Council of Santander, Palencia and Burgos ===
Portrait	Name	Term begins	Term ends	Political Party	Notes
	Juan Ruiz Olazarán	February 8, 1937	August 26, 1937	Spanish Socialist Workers' Party (PSOE)	

=== Presidents of Cantabria ===
Portrait	Name	Term begins	Term ends	Political Party	Notes
	José Antonio Rodríguez	March 15, 1982	March 2, 1984	Independent	
	Ángel Díaz de Entresotos	March 2, 1984	June 24, 1987	People's Alliance (AP)	
	Juan Hormaechea	June 24, 1987	December 5, 1990	Independent	
	Jaime Blanco	December 5, 1990	July 2, 1991	Socialist Party of Cantabria (PSC-PSOE)	
	Juan Hormaechea	July 2, 1991	July 13, 1995	Union for the Progress of Cantabria (UPCA); People's Party (PP)	
	José Joaquín Martínez Sieso	July 13, 1995	June 27, 2003	People's Party (PP)	
	Miguel Ángel Revilla	June 27, 2003	June 23, 2011	Regionalist Party of Cantabria (PRC)	
	Ignacio Diego	June 23, 2011	July 7, 2015	People's Party (PP)	
	Miguel Ángel Revilla	July 7, 2015	July 5, 2023	Regionalist Party of Cantabria (PRC)	
	María José Sáenz de Buruaga	July 5, 2023	Incumbent	People's Party (PP)	

== See also ==
- Parliament of Cantabria
- Government of Cantabria
- Politics of Spain
- Political divisions of Spain
- Nationalities and regions of Spain
