= José Antonio Rodríguez Martínez =

Spanish politician

José Antonio Rodríguez
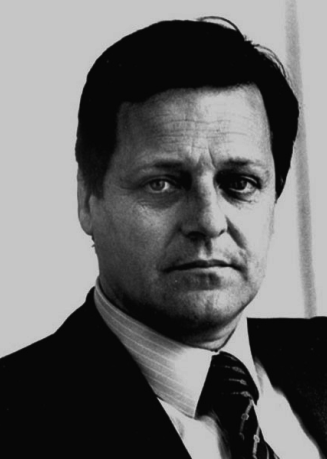

1st President of Cantabria
- In office 15 March 1982 – 2 March 1984
- Preceded by: Office created
- Succeeded by: Ángel Díaz de Entresotos

Personal details
- Born: José Antonio Rodríguez Martínez; 27 May 1931 Santander, Cantabria, Spain
- Party: UCD (until 1982); Independent

José Antonio Rodríguez Martínez (born 26 May 1931) is a Spanish politician and former president of Cantabria between 1982 and 1984.
