= Ángel Díaz de Entresotos =

Spanish politician (1927–2009)

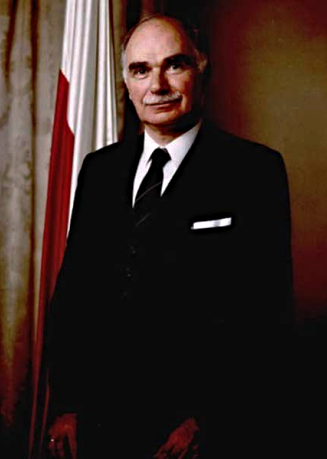

2nd President of Cantabria
- In office 18 March 1984 – 24 June 1987
- Preceded by: José Antonio Rodríguez
- Succeeded by: Juan Hormaechea

Personal details
- Born: Ángel Díaz de Entresotos; 5 December 1927 Santander, Cantabria, Spain
- Died: 16 November 2009 (aged 81) Santander, Cantabria, Spain
- Party: People's Alliance

Ángel Díaz de Entresotos y Mier (5 December 1927 – 16 November 2009) was a Spanish politician and former President of Cantabria between 1984 and 1987.
