= Jaime Blanco =

Spanish politician (1944–2020)

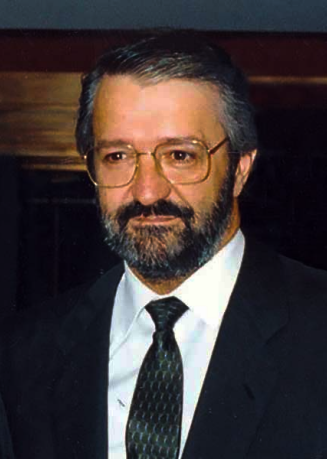

4th President of Cantabria
- In office 5 December 1990 – 2 July 1991
- Preceded by: Juan Hormaechea
- Succeeded by: Juan Hormaechea

Personal details
- Born: Jaime Blanco García; 1 May 1944 Santander, Cantabria, Spain
- Died: 24 September 2020 Santander
- Party: Spanish Socialist Workers' Party

Jaime Blanco García (1 May 1944 – 24 September 2020) was a Spanish politician and President of Cantabria between 1990 and 1991.

From 1987 to 1990 he served in the Parliament of Cantabria. He was a member of the Spanish Congress of Deputies for Cantabria for five terms, and he served three terms in the Senate of Spain.
