= Statute of Autonomy of Cantabria =

Cantabria's maximum legislative text

The Statute of Autonomy of Cantabria is the basic institutional norm of the autonomous community of Cantabria in Spain. It determines the fields, bodies and institutions of self-government of the Cantabrian community. Legally it is the Organic Law 8/1981 of 30 December 1981, passed on 15 December the same year in the Congress and published on the BOE on 11 January 1982. Later it has been modified to extend responsibilities and to define provisional articles.

== Bibliography ==
- Guía oficial del Parlamento de Cantabria. VI Legislatura. Santander 2004. Parlamento de Cantabria.
