= Union for the Progress of Cantabria =

Defunct political party in Spain

Union for the Progress of Cantabria Unión para el Progreso de Cantabria
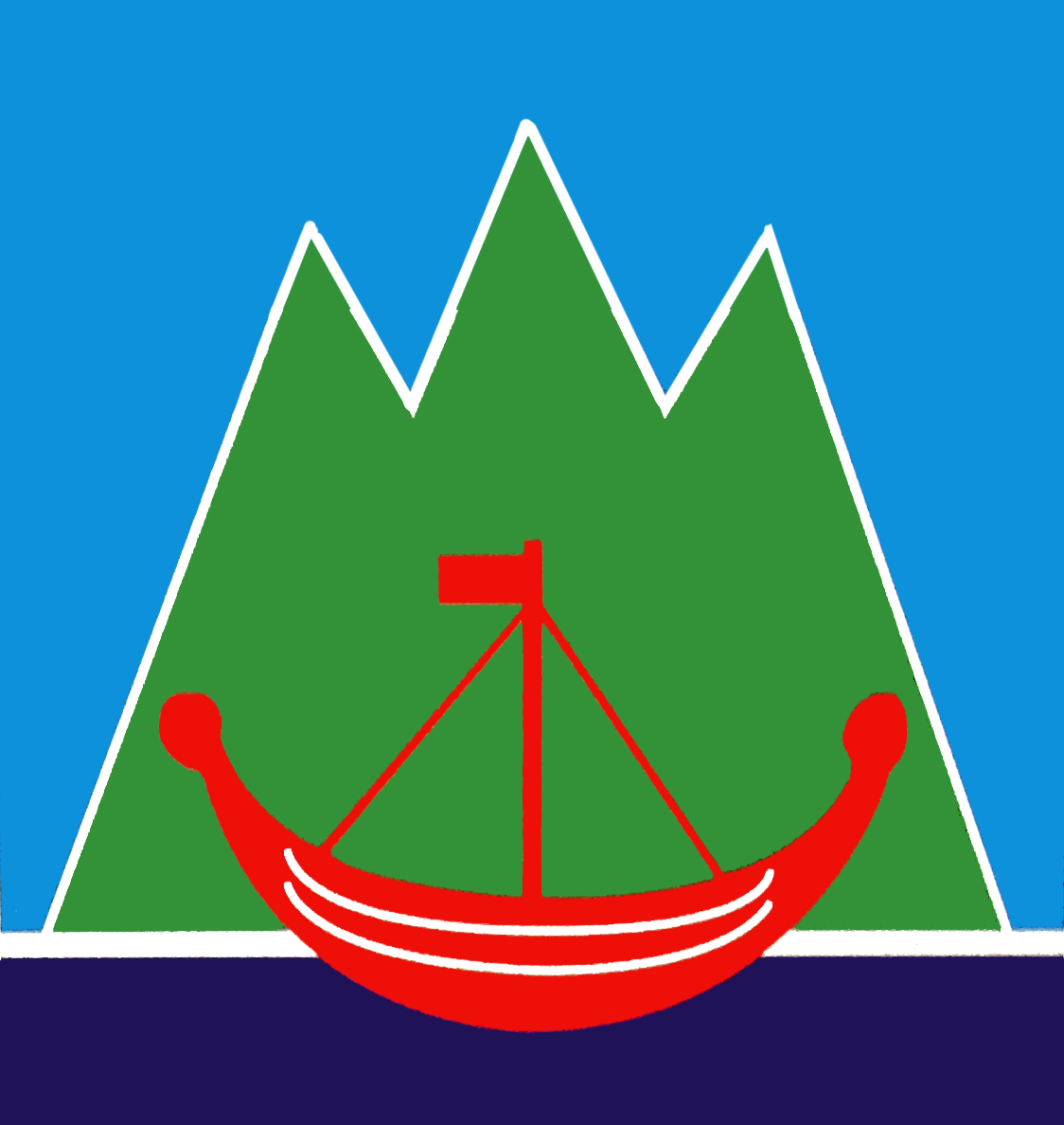
- Leader: Juan Hormaechea
- Founded: 23 January 1991
- Split from: People's Party
- Headquarters: Santander
- Ideology: Cantabrian regionalism Liberal conservatism
- Political position: Centre-right

The Union for the Progress of Cantabria (Spanish: Unión para el Progreso de Cantabria, UPCA) was a political party in the Spanish Autonomous Community of Cantabria. The UPCA was created after Juan Hormaechea split from the People's Party in 1991.

== Election results ==
=== Local elections ===
| Elections | Votes | % | Town councillors |
|---|---|---|---|
| Spanish municipal elections, 1991 | 71,683 | 24.35 | 285 |
| Spanish municipal elections, 1995 | 41,628 | 13.06 | 170 |
| Spanish municipal elections, 1999 | 9,179 | 2.9 | 29 |
| Spanish municipal elections, 2003 | 101 | 0.03 | 0 |

=== Cantabrian autonomous elections ===
| Elections | Votes | % | MPs |
|---|---|---|---|
| Cantabrian parliamentary election, 1991 | 99,289 | 34.93 | 15 |
| Cantabrian parliamentary election, 1995 | 53,065 | 17.2 | 7 |
| Cantabrian parliamentary election, 1999 | 9,743 | 3.07 | 0 |

=== General elections ===
| Elections | Votes | % | MPs |
|---|---|---|---|
| Spanish general election, 1993 | 27,005 | 8.2 | 0 |
