= Juan Hormaechea =

Spanish politician (1939–2020)

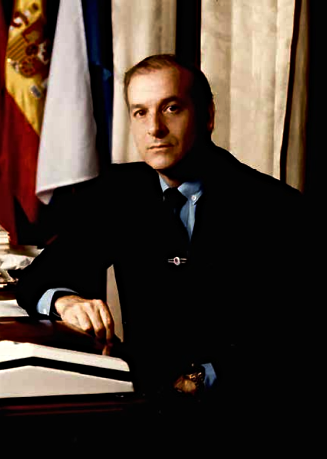

3rd and 5th President of Cantabria
- In office 24 June 1987 – 5 December 1990
- Preceded by: Ángel Díaz de Entresotos
- Succeeded by: Jaime Blanco García
- In office 2 July 1991 – 13 July 1995
- Preceded by: Jaime Blanco García
- Succeeded by: José Joaquín Martínez Sieso

Mayor of Santander
- In office 15 June 1977 – 24 June 1987
- Preceded by: Alfonso Fuente Alonso
- Succeeded by: Manuel Huerta Castillo

Personal details
- Born: Juan Hormaechea Cazón; 5 June 1939 Santander, Cantabria, Spain
- Died: 1 December 2020 (aged 81) Santander
- Party: UCD; Independent (linked to AP); UPCA

Juan Hormaechea Cazón (5 June 1939 – 1 December 2020) was a Spanish politician who served as President of Cantabria between 1987 and 1990, and again from 1991 to 1995. He was also Mayor of Santander between 1977 and 1987. Hormaechea founded the Union for the Progress of Cantabria (UPCA) political party in 1991 after a split from the larger People's Party of Cantabria (PP). The UPCA dissolved in 2003.

On 24 October 1994 the High Court of Justice of Cantabria condemned him to 6 years and one day in prison and 14 years of disqualification for a crime of embezzlement and another of prevarication. He never entered jail because he was pardoned by Prime Minister Felipe González in 1995.
