= Motions of no confidence in Spain =

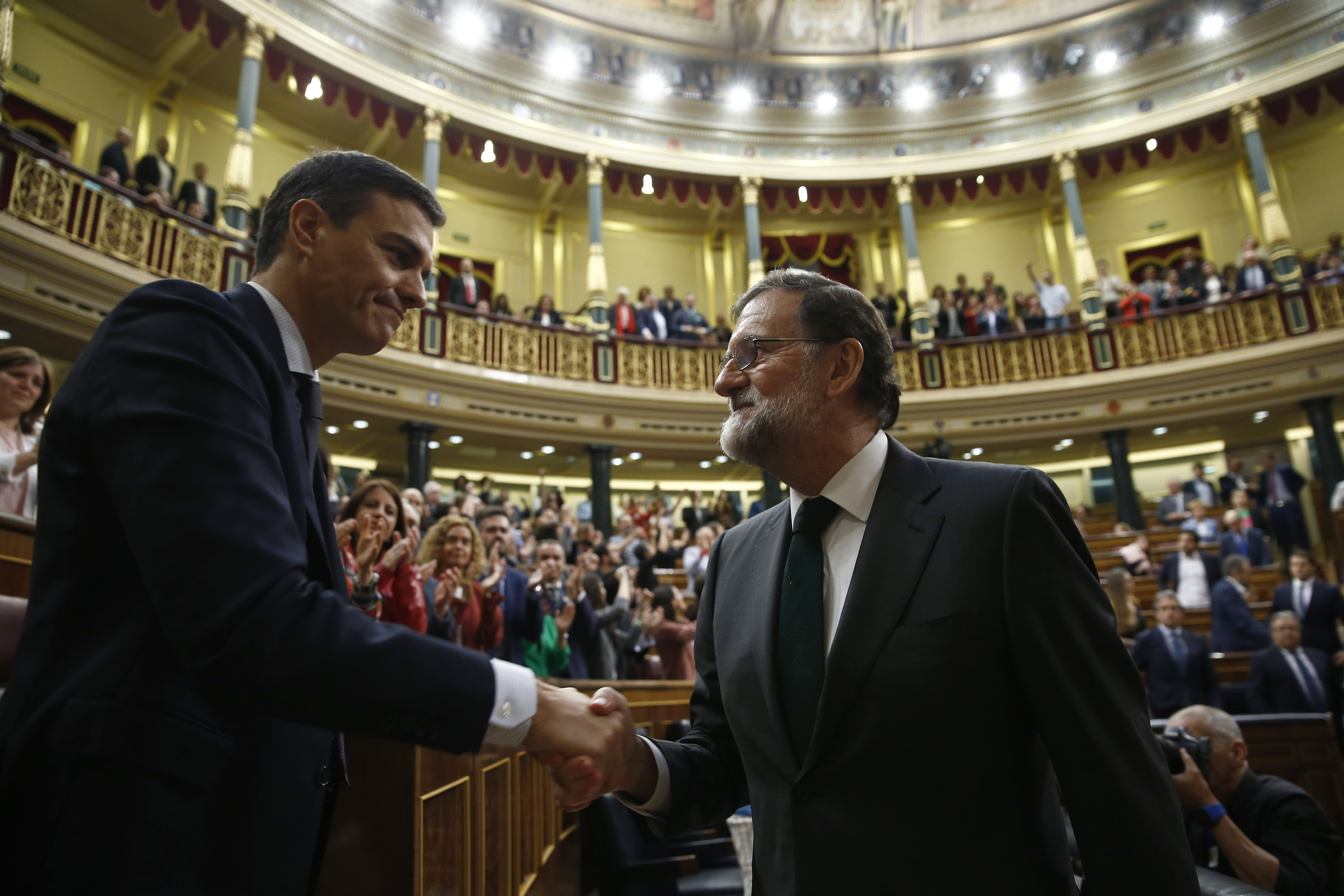
The outgoing Prime Minister Mariano Rajoy (right) congratulates the incoming Prime Minister Pedro Sánchez (left) upon losing the no confidence vote on 1 June 2018.

Motions of no confidence in Spain are a parliamentary procedure that allows the Congress of Deputies or a parliament of an autonomous community to withdraw its trust from the president of the Government of Spain or the president of the autonomous community, respectively, and force their resignation.

In Spain, the motion of no confidence is constructive (as the authors of the motion need to propose a new Prime Minister) and continuist (as it doesn't lead to snap elections).

The motion of no confidence against the President of the Government of Spain is established in article 113 of the Spanish Constitution of 1978. There have been a total of six motions of no confidence in the Congress of Deputies against the presidents Suárez (1980), González (1987), Rajoy (2017 and 2018), Sánchez (2020, 2023). Only one of them was successful: the second motion of no confidence against Rajoy was approved on June 1, 2018, and the candidate Pedro Sánchez was invested as President of the Government.

The motion of no confidence against the regional presidents is established in the respective autonomy statutes of the autonomous communities. A total of 31 motions of no confidence have been presented in the autonomous parliaments or in the autonomous cities, of which 9 were approved.

== Procedure ==
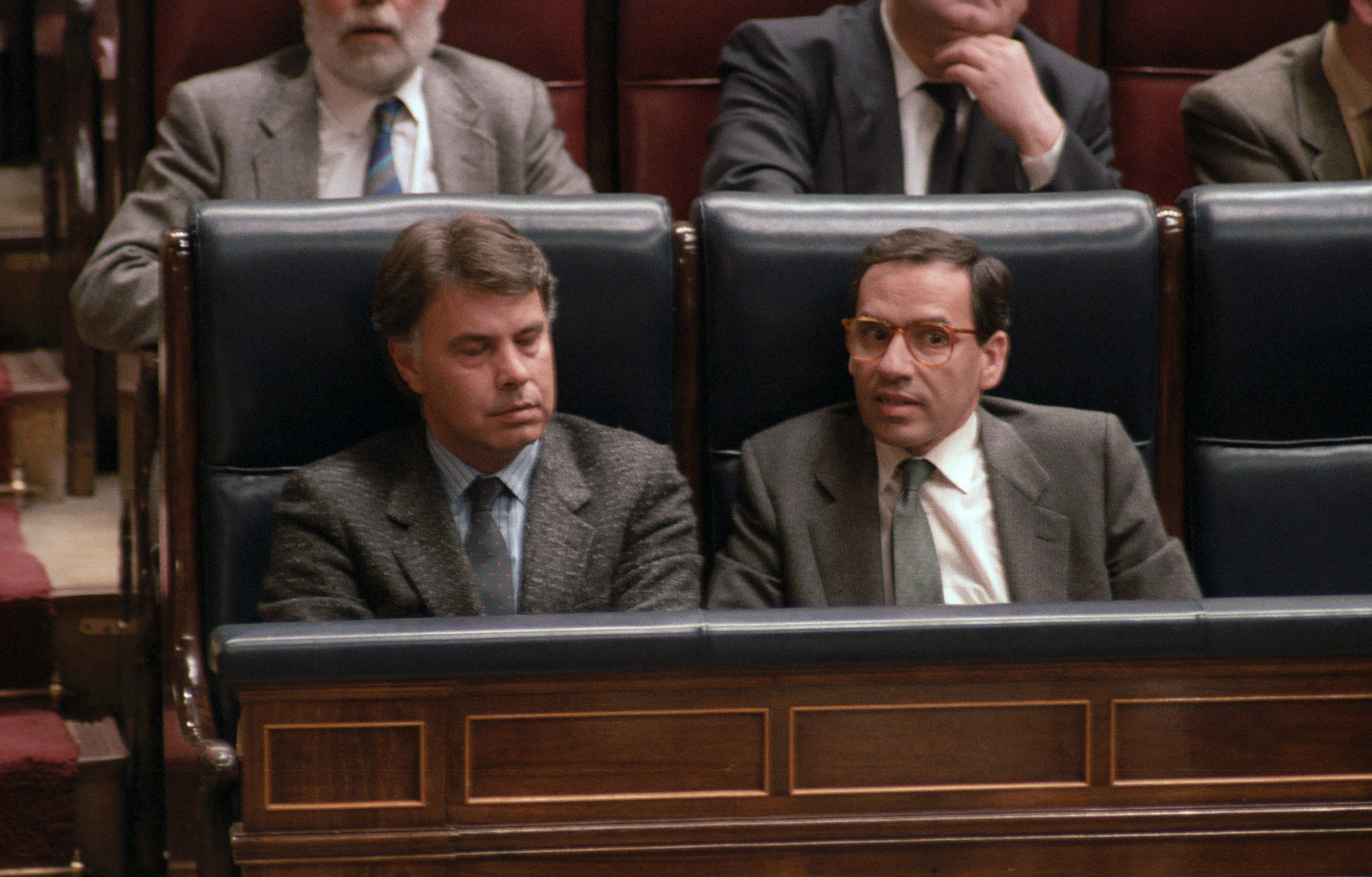
Prime Minister Felipe González during the motion of no confidence led by Antonio Hernández Mancha in 1987

Article 113 of the Spanish Constitution of 1978 and the Regulations of the Congress of Deputies establish the mode of operation of the motion of no confidence against the Prime Minister of Spain. It must be proposed by at least one-tenth of the members of the Congress of Deputies (currently 35), and it must include a candidate for the presidency of the Government of Spain.

After the presentation of the motion of no confidence, the Board of Congress must meet to qualify the motion, within a maximum period of 7 days from the presentation of the motion. Once qualified, a period of two days is opened to present alternative motions, which must also be signed by 35 deputies and include a candidate for the presidency of the Government. The debate on the motion or motions of no confidence in this case cannot begin until after said period has elapsed.

Next, the presidency of Congress calls the session of the motion of no confidence, within a maximum period of 20 days, unless the General State Budgets are being processed simultaneously, in which case said maximum period begins to count at the end of its processing. In the vote of the motion of no confidence, which cannot be held in any case until five days after its presentation, it is necessary to obtain an absolute majority of affirmative votes in the Congress of Deputies in order to succeed.

In Spain, following the German model, the motion of no confidence is constructive. The group that raises the motion of censure in turn proposes a new Prime Minister. It is also continuist; it does not imply the advancement of the elections but rather the electoral calendar continues unaltered. While the motion of no confidence is pending, the Prime Minister cannot dissolve the Congress of Deputies and call elections, in order to prevent the Prime Minister from avoiding their parliamentary responsibility by calling the polls. Notwithstanding the foregoing, the Prime Minister may waive the motion of censure by resigning. In this case, the Prime Minister may continue as acting Prime Minister in office, without any possibility of being censured, but Congress is empowered to appoint a successor by simple majority at any time.

If the motion of no confidence is adopted, the Government must present its resignation to the King of Spain within 24 hours of its adoption. When the motion of censure is approved, it is understood that the Congress has granted confidence to the proposed candidate and the king must appoint them President of the Government within 15 days of its adoption, provided that the censured Government has already resigned, although it is customary to do so immediately. In the event that the motion of no confidence is not approved, those who have proposed it cannot present another within the same period of sessions.

== Motions of no confidence ==
To date, five motions of no confidence have been held at the national level and another twenty-four at the autonomous level, which are listed below:

=== Congress of Deputies ===
| Date | Prime Minister | Candidate | Result (required to win) | | Ref. |
|---|---|---|---|---|---|
| 30 May 1980 | Adolfo Suárez (UCD) | Felipe González (PSOE) | 152–166 (176) | Rejected | |
| 30 Mar 1987 | Felipe González (PSOE) | Antonio Hernández Mancha (AP) | 67–194 (176) | Rejected | |
| 14 Jun 2017 | Mariano Rajoy (PP) | Pablo Iglesias (Podemos) | 82–170 (176) | Rejected | |
| 1 Jun 2018 | Mariano Rajoy (PP) | Pedro Sánchez (PSOE) | 180–169 (176) | Approved | |
| 22 Oct 2020 | Pedro Sánchez (PSOE) | Santiago Abascal (Vox) | 52–298 (176) | Rejected | |
| 22 Mar 2023 | Pedro Sánchez (PSOE) | Ramón Tamames (INDEP); Proposed by Vox | 53–201 (175) (Note: Due to a vacant seat in Parliament, the working majority was reduced from 176 to 175.) | Rejected | |

=== Autonomous parliaments ===
The Balearic Islands and Andalusia are the only Autonomous communities where a motion of no confidence has never been proposed.

| Date | Autonomous community | Regional president | Candidate | Result (required to win) | | Ref. |
|---|---|---|---|---|---|---|
| 1 Oct 1982 | Catalonia | Jordi Pujol (CDC) | Josep Benet (PSUC) | 21–56 (68) | Rejected | |
| 23 Sep 1987 | Galicia | Gerardo Fernández Albor (AP) | Fernando González Laxe (PSdG) | 40–29 (36) | Approved | |
| 21 Jun 1989 | Community of Madrid | Joaquín Leguina (PSOE) | Alberto Ruiz-Gallardón (PP) | 48–40 (49) | Rejected | |
| 8 Jan 1990 | La Rioja | Joaquín Espert (PP) | José Ignacio Pérez Sáenz (PSOE) | 17–13 (17) | Approved | |
| 5 Dec 1990 | Cantabria | Juan Hormaechea (UPCA) | Jaime Blanco (PSOE) | 26–12 (20) | Approved | |
| 31 Mar 1993 | Canary Islands | Jerónimo Saavedra (PSOE) | Manuel Hermoso (CC) | 31–23 (31) | Approved | |
| 1 Jul 1993 | Cantabria | Juan Hormaechea (UPCA) | Jaime Blanco (PSOE) | 18–21 (20) | Rejected | |
| 15 Sep 1993 | Aragon | Emilio Eiroa (PAR) | José Marco (PSOE) | 34–33 (34) | Approved | |
| 5 Jan 1994 | Cantabria | Juan Hormaechea (UPCA) | Jaime Blanco (PSOE) | 18–17 (20) | Rejected | |
| 21 Dec 1994 | Aragon | José Marco (PSOE) | Emilio Eiroa (PAR) | 32–30 (34) | Rejected | |
| 10 Mar 1999 | Asturias | Sergio Marqués (URAS) | Ovidio Sánchez (PP) | 16–6 (23) | Rejected | |
| 5 Oct 2000 | Basque Country | Juan José Ibarretxe (PNV) | Nicolás Redondo (PSE–EE) | 32–29 (38) | Rejected | |
| 5 Oct 2000 | Basque Country | Juan José Ibarretxe (PNV) | Carlos Iturgaiz (PP) | 32–29 (38) | Rejected | |
| 29 Jan 2001 | Galicia | Manuel Fraga (PP) | Xosé Manuel Beiras (BNG) | 18–41 (38) | Rejected | |
| 18 Oct 2001 | Catalonia | Jordi Pujol (CDC) | Pasqual Maragall (PSC) | 55–68 (68) | Rejected | |
| 7 Nov 2001 | Canary Islands | Román Rodríguez (CC) | Juan Carlos Alemán (PSOE) | 19–39 (31) | Rejected | |
| 12 Dec 2002 | Galicia | Manuel Fraga (PP) | Emilio Pérez Touriño (PSdeG) | 34–41 (38) | Rejected | |
| 12 Dec 2002 | Galicia | Manuel Fraga (PP) | Xosé Manuel Beiras (BNG) | 34–41 (38) | Rejected | |
| Withdrawn; 11 Mar 2005 | Catalonia | Pasqual Maragall (PSC) | Josep Piqué (PP) | —N/a | Withdrawn | |
| 4 Oct 2006 | Valencian Community | Francisco Camps (PP) | Joan Ignasi Pla (PSPV) | 35–47 (45) | Rejected | |
| 18 Apr 2013 | Navarre | Yolanda Barcina (UPN) | Juan Carlos Longás (Aralar–NaBai) | 18–23 (26) | Rejected | |
| 14 May 2014 | Extremadura | José Antonio Monago (PP) | Guillermo Fernández Vara (PSOE) | 30–32 (33) | Rejected | |
| Withdrawn; 4 Apr 2017 | Region of Murcia | Pedro Antonio Sánchez (PP) | Rafael González Tovar (PSOE) | —N/a | Resigned | |
| 8 Jun 2017 | Community of Madrid | Cristina Cifuentes (PP) | Lorena Ruiz-Huerta (Podemos) | 27–64 (65) | Rejected | |
| Withdrawn; 25 Apr 2018 | Community of Madrid | Cristina Cifuentes (PP) | Ángel Gabilondo (PSOE) | —N/a | Resigned | |
| 7 Oct 2019 | Catalonia | Quim Torra (JuntsxCat) | Lorena Roldán (Cs) | 40–76 (68) | Rejected | |
| Dismissed; 11 Mar 2021 | Community of Madrid | Isabel Díaz Ayuso (PP) | Mónica García (Más Madrid) | —N/a | Dismissed | |
| Dismissed; 11 Mar 2021 | Community of Madrid | Isabel Díaz Ayuso (PP) | Ángel Gabilondo (PSOE) | —N/a | Dismissed | |
| 18 Mar 2021 | Region of Murcia | Fernando López Miras (PP) | Ana Martínez Vidal (Cs) | 21–23 (23) | Rejected | |
| 22 Mar 2021 | Castile and León | Alfonso Fernández Mañueco (PP) | Luis Tudanca (PSOE) | 37–41 (41) | Rejected | |

=== Autonomous cities ===
| Year | Autonomous city | Mayor-president | Candidate | Result | Ref. |
|---|---|---|---|---|---|
| 1998 | Melilla | Ignacio Velázquez Rivera (PP) | Alberto Paz Martínez (PSOE) | Rejected | |
| 1998 | Melilla | Ignacio Velázquez Rivera (PP) | Enrique Palacios Hernández (PIM) | Approved | |
| 1999 | Ceuta | Jesús Cayetano Fortes Ramos (PP) | Antonio Sampietro (GIL) | Approved | |
| 2000 | Melilla | Mustafa Aberchán (CpM) | Juan José Imbroda (UPM-PP) | Approved | |
| 2001 | Ceuta | Antonio Sampietro (GIL) | Juan Jesús Vivas (PP) | Approved | |

== See also ==
- Motion of no confidence
