= Congress of the Deputies vote for Prime Minister (Spain) =

The prime minister of Spain is the head of the government of Spain. Under Article 99 of the Constitution of Spain, the prime minister is appointed by the king of Spain on the nomination of the Congress of Deputies, the lower house of the Cortes Generales. The candidate for the position of prime minister is not required to be a member of Congress.

After a general election or the resignation of a prime minister, members of Congress are proposed by the king for the position of prime minister. There can be only one candidate per session. If the Congress of Deputies, by the vote of the absolute majority of its members, gives its confidence in said candidate, the king will appoint them as prime minister. If said majority is not reached, the same proposal will be submitted to a new vote forty-eight hours after the previous one, and trust will be deemed granted if a simple majority is obtained.

The Constitution of Spain came into operation on 6 December 1978, following the dictatorship of Francisco Franco and the Spanish transition to democracy.

A breakdown of votes is on the pages of governments formed, while support for unsuccessful candidates is noted below.

Election	Candidate	Party	Yes	No	Abstain	Date	Government	Notes
1979 elections	Adolfo Suárez	UCD	183 / 350	149 / 350	8 / 350	30 March 1979	Suárez III	
1979 elections	Felipe González	PSOE	152 / 350	166 / 350	21 / 350	30 May 1980		Motion of no confidence
1979 elections	Adolfo Suárez	UCD	180 / 350	164 / 350	2 / 350	18 September 1980		Motion of confidence
Resignation of Adolfo Suárez	Leopoldo Calvo-Sotelo	UCD	169 / 350	158 / 350	17 / 350	23 February 1981	Failed	
Resignation of Adolfo Suárez	Leopoldo Calvo-Sotelo	UCD	186 / 350	158 / 350	0 / 350	25 February 1981	Calvo-Sotelo I	
1982 elections	Felipe González	PSOE	207 / 350	116 / 350	21 / 350	1 December 1982	González I	
1986 elections	Felipe González	PSOE	184 / 350	144 / 350	6 / 350	23 July 1986	González II	
1986 elections	Antonio Hernández Mancha	AP	67 / 350	194 / 350	71 / 350	30 March 1987		Motion of no confidence
1989 elections	Felipe González	PSOE	167 / 332	155 / 332	6 / 332	5 December 1989	González III	
1989 elections	Felipe González	PSOE	176 / 350	130 / 350	37 / 350	5 April 1990		Motion of confidence
1993 elections	Felipe González	PSOE	181 / 350	165 / 350	1 / 350	9 July 1993	González IV	
1996 elections	José María Aznar	PP	181 / 350	166 / 350	0 / 350	4 May 1996	Aznar I	
2000 elections	José María Aznar	PP	202 / 350	148 / 350	0 / 350	26 April 2000	Aznar II	
2004 elections	José Luis Rodríguez Zapatero	PSOE	183 / 350	148 / 350	19 / 350	16 April 2004	Zapatero I	
2008 elections	José Luis Rodríguez Zapatero	PSOE	168 / 350	158 / 350	23 / 350	9 April 2008	Failed	
2008 elections	José Luis Rodríguez Zapatero	PSOE	169 / 350	158 / 350	23 / 350	11 April 2008	Zapatero II	
2011 elections	Mariano Rajoy	PP	187 / 350	149 / 350	14 / 350	20 December 2011	Rajoy I	
2015 elections	Pedro Sánchez	PSOE	130 / 350	219 / 350	1 / 350	2 March 2016	Failed	
2015 elections	Pedro Sánchez	PSOE	131 / 350	219 / 350	0 / 350	4 March 2016	Failed	
2016 elections	Mariano Rajoy	PP	170 / 350	180 / 350	0 / 350	31 August 2016	Failed	
2016 elections	Mariano Rajoy	PP	170 / 350	180 / 350	0 / 350	2 September 2016	Failed	
2016 elections	Mariano Rajoy	PP	170 / 350	180 / 350	0 / 350	27 October 2016	Failed	
2016 elections	Mariano Rajoy	PP	170 / 350	111 / 350	68 / 350	29 October 2016	Rajoy II	
2016 elections	Pablo Iglesias	Podemos	82 / 350	170 / 350	97 / 350	14 June 2017		Motion of no confidence
2016 elections	Pedro Sánchez	PSOE	180 / 350	169 / 350	1 / 350	1 June 2018	Sánchez I	Motion of no confidence
April 2019 elections	Pedro Sánchez	PSOE	124 / 350	170 / 350	52 / 350	23 July 2019	Failed	
April 2019 elections	Pedro Sánchez	PSOE	124 / 350	155 / 350	67 / 350	25 July 2019	Failed	
November 2019 elections	Pedro Sánchez	PSOE	166 / 350	165 / 350	18 / 350	5 January 2020	Failed	
November 2019 elections	Pedro Sánchez	PSOE	166 / 350	165 / 350	18 / 350	7 January 2020	Sánchez II	
November 2019 elections	Santiago Abascal	Vox	52 / 350	298 / 350	0 / 350	22 October 2020		Motion of no confidence
