= 2017 vote of no confidence in the government of Mariano Rajoy =

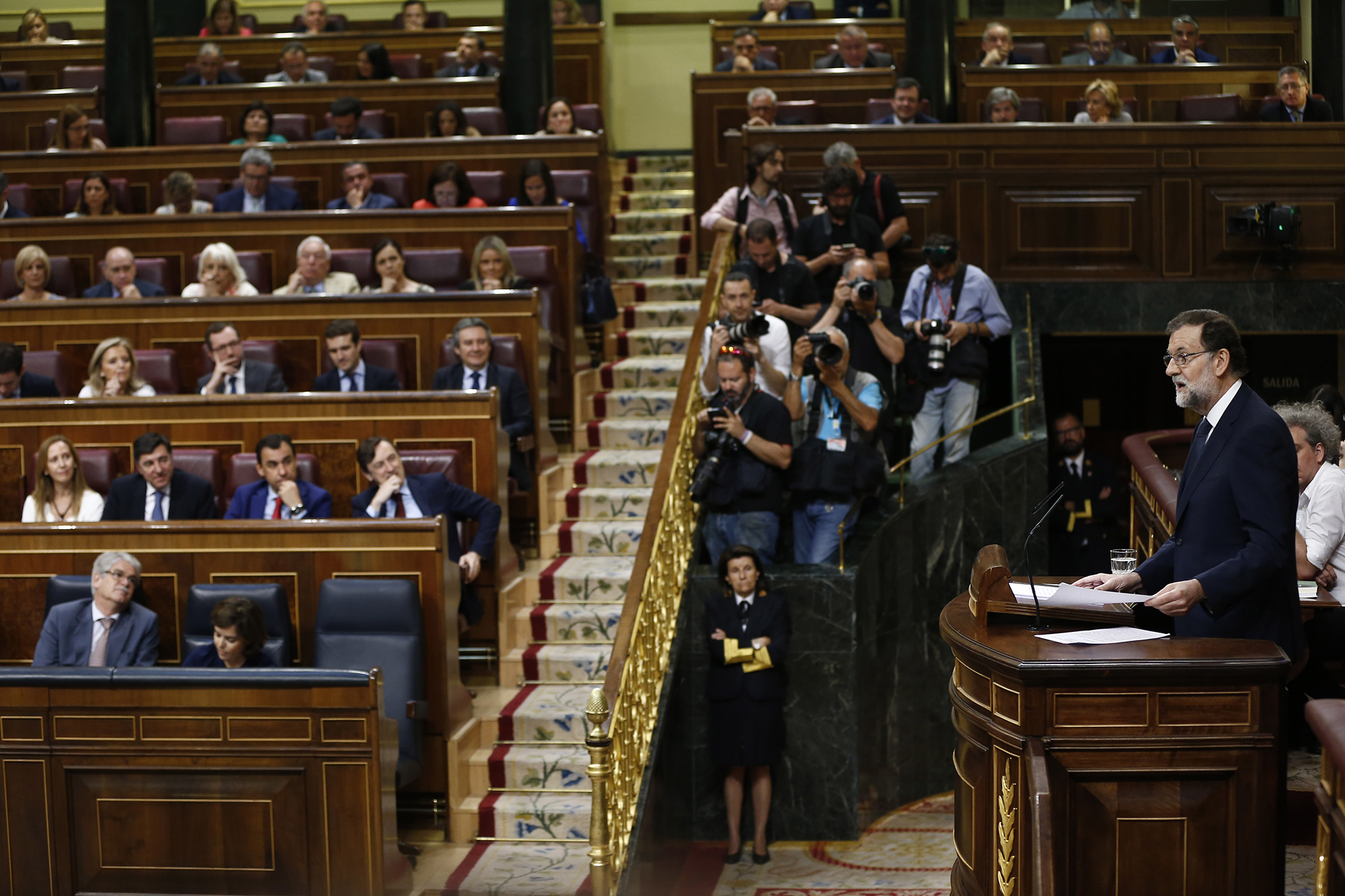
- Prime minister Mariano Rajoy, taking the floor during the debate on the motion of no confidence on 13 June 2017
- Date: 13–14 June 2017 (1 day)
- Location: Congress of Deputies, Spain
- Type: Motion of no confidence
- Cause: The unveiling of a string of corruption scandals affecting the People's Party (PP)
- Participants: PP; PSOE; Unidos Podemos; Cs; ERC; PDeCAT; PNV; Compromís; EH Bildu; UPN; CCa; FAC; NCa
- Outcome: Motion rejected

A motion of no confidence in the Spanish government of Mariano Rajoy was debated and voted in the Congress of Deputies between 13 and 14 June 2017. It was brought by Unidos Podemos leader Pablo Iglesias as a result of a corruption case involving high-ranking People's Party (PP) officials, amid accusations of maneuvers from the Rajoy government to influence the judicial system in order to cover-up the scandal. This was the third vote of no confidence held in Spain since the country's transition to democracy—after the unsuccessful 1980 and 1987 ones—as well as the first not to be registered by the main opposition party at the time.

The Spanish Socialist Workers' Party (PSOE), Citizens (Cs) and the Basque Nationalist Party (PNV) announced their rejection to any candidate proposed by Podemos, meaning that the motion was unlikely to succeed. These parties criticized the motion in that it was aimed more as a propaganda move to meddle in the ongoing PSOE leadership election rather than a genuine and realistic attempt to bring down Rajoy's government. Nonetheless, it garnered the support of Compromís, Republican Left of Catalonia (ERC) and EH Bildu.

The motion was defeated with a total of 82 votes in support, the negative vote of PP, Cs, Navarrese People's Union (UPN), Canarian Coalition (CCa) and Asturias Forum (FAC)—totalling 170 votes against—and the abstentions of PSOE, the Catalan European Democratic Party (PDeCAT), PNV and New Canaries (NCa)—totalling 97. While the initiative was unsuccessful, it revealed the weakness of Rajoy's government as support votes and abstentions added up to more votes than Rajoy could command on his behalf. This would set the grounds for a similar, successful motion in May 2018 seeing the downfall of Rajoy's government and the election of Pedro Sánchez as Prime Minister of Spain.

== Background ==
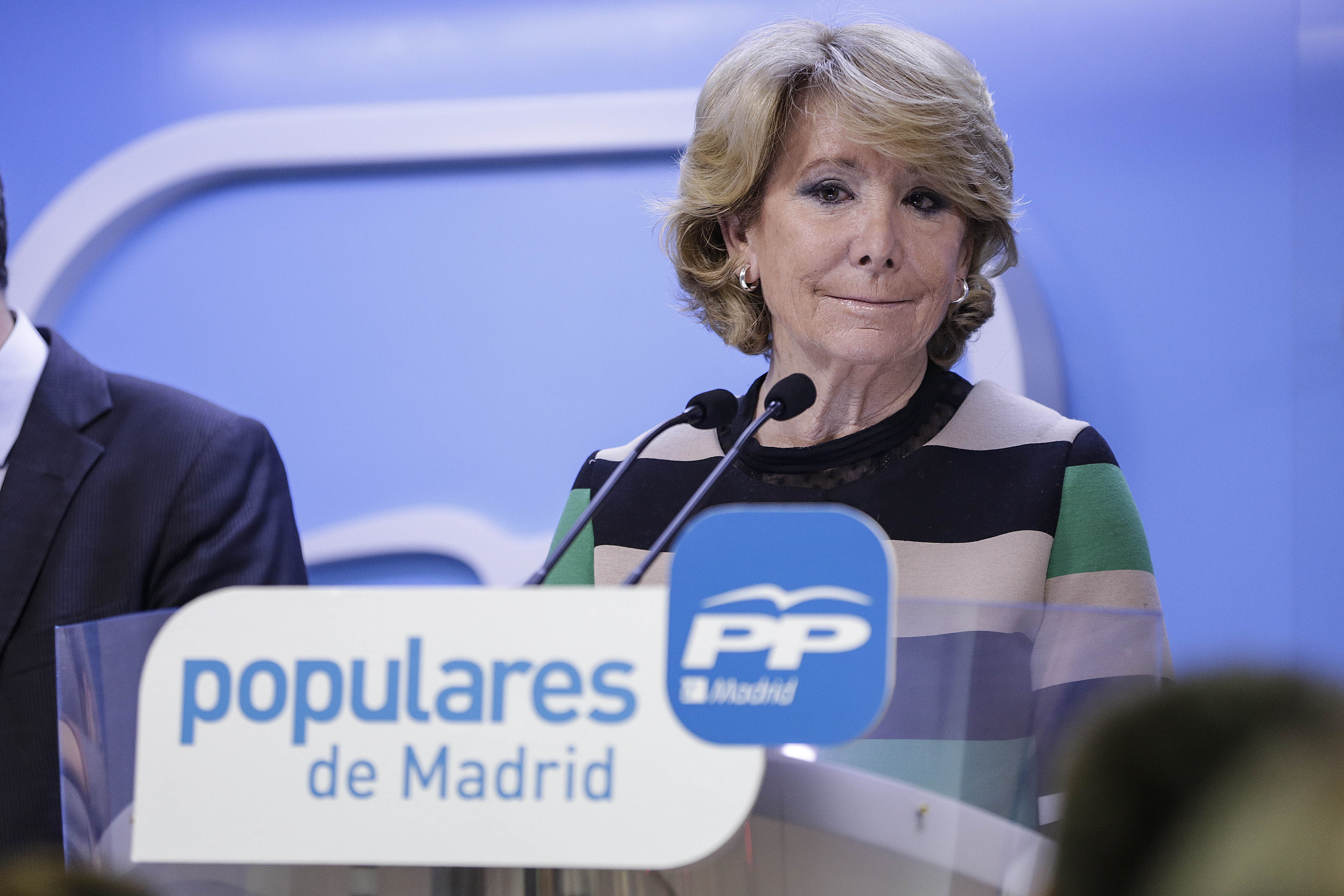
PP veteran Esperanza Aguirre was forced out from politics after her former protégé Ignacio González came involved in the Lezo scandal.

Rajoy's second government was sworn into office on 31 October 2016, after a ten-month political deadlock, two general elections and the Spanish Socialist Workers' Party's (PSOE) ultimate decision not to block Mariano Rajoy's investiture bid following an internal crisis that had led to Pedro Sánchez's resignation as party leader. However, the resulting government was a minority one, and throughout the ensuing months it struggled to get its bills passed into law. Furthermore, the ruling People's Party (PP) came under increasing political pressure after a corruption scandal in Murcia had forced the resignation of regional president Pedro Antonio Sánchez.

In April 2017, after only five months into its term, the PP was shaken by a succession of events that damaged the party's image. Just as prime minister Rajoy was called to testify as witness at the Gürtel graft trial, a new case of alleged corruption was unveiled (dubbed as "Lezo"), joining the already ongoing investigations into the Púnica and Gürtel scandals. Operation Lezo resulted in the arrest of former Madrilenian president Ignacio González, who was accused of diverting millions of euros from the public treasury into tax havens and to pay off the regional party's debts during his tenure as Madrid premier. The scope of the new scandal reached heights never seen in Spanish politics. Several companies—namely OHL, PricewaterhouseCoopers, Indra and Canal de Isabel II, among others—suspect of having illegally financed the PP's Madrilenian branch, had their headquarters in Spain registered by the police in search of incriminating documentation. Party veteran and former González's boss Esperanza Aguirre resigned from her remaining political offices after seeing many of her former close advisers imprisoned or indicted in a number of judicial procedures.

The leaking of a series of recordings that involved González and various high-ranking PP and government officials—including former Valencian president Eduardo Zaplana and justice minister Rafael Catalá—unveiled a plot from the interior and justice ministries to cover-up the scandal, seriously putting judicial independence in Spain into question. In one of the leaked recordings, González pointed to a tape that would allegedly show Rajoy receiving bribes from a businessman, and that this would have been used by Intereconomía CEO Julio Ariza in the past to blackmail him. Concurrently, the anti-corruption chief prosecutor, Manuel Moix—revealed by police wiretaps to have been favoured for the job by Ignacio González himself—was accused of trying to stop investigations into the PP graft accusations. Secretary of State for Security José Antonio Nieto—Juan Ignacio Zoido's deputy in the interior ministry—came under pressure after being accused of revealing details of the ongoing investigations to González's brother in a private meeting held on 8 March 2017.

By mid-May, the string of scandals had splattered Cristina Cifuentes, incumbent president of Madrid, who was accused by the Civil Guard of having been involved in the contract-awarding procedures that led to her party's illegal financing between 2007 and 2012. By this time, it was also concluded that Esperanza Aguirre had won the 2007 and 2011 regional elections unfairly, with her campaign budgets well above those legally declared, through a system that "hurted political pluralism". Allegedly, these illegal funds were also used by Mariano Rajoy's campaign in the 2008 general election. Suspicions of embezzlement in the Community of Madrid reached as far back as 2001, during Alberto Ruiz-Gallardón's tenure, whose cabinet at the time was put under investigation by the Civil Guard. In the meantime, a separate investigation by the National Police into the ongoing scandals involving the family of former Catalan president Jordi Pujol linked former labour minister Manuel Pimentel and Ignacio López del Hierro, husband of María Dolores de Cospedal—incumbent defence minister and PP secretary-general—to another corruption plot in Africa, with connections to the Lezo scandal.

As a result of the scandals and Rajoy's refusal to take any action, Unidos Podemos members—comprising Podemos, United Left, En Comú Podem and En Marea—announced on 27 April that they would table a motion of no confidence and would request support for it from PSOE and other parties. The rivalries between the parties in opposition, however, meant that the initiative was unlikely to succeed: PSOE rejected the motion and accused Podemos leader Pablo Iglesias of "bad faith" and of interfering within the party's ongoing leadership primary election, whereas Citizens (Cs)—on which the Rajoy government relied for confidence and supply support—labeled the move as "a circus". The Basque Nationalist Party (PNV) also voiced its rejection to the maneuver. Nonetheless, the Socialists were put in a difficult situation, as opposing the motion would see them rallying behind Rajoy's government amid the ongoing scandals at a time when they were still without a leader.

== Legal provisions ==
The Spanish Constitution of 1978 required for motions of no confidence to be proposed by at least one-tenth of the Congress of Deputies—35 out of 350. Following the German model, votes of no confidence in Spain were constructive, so the motion was required to include an alternative candidate for prime minister. For a motion of no confidence to be successful, it had to be passed by an absolute majority in the Congress of Deputies. A minimum period of five days from the motion's registration (dubbed as "cooling period") was required to pass before it could come up for a vote, but no maximum was established. Other parties were entitled to submit alternative motions within the first two days from the registration.

1. The Congress of Deputies may challenge Government policy by passing a motion of censure by an absolute majority of its members.
2. The motion of censure must be proposed by at least one tenth of the Deputies, including a candidate for the office of President of the Government.
3. The motion of censure may not be voted on until five days after it has been submitted. During the first two days of this period, alternative motions may be submitted.
4. If the motion of censure is not passed by the Congress, its signatories may not submit another during the same session.

— Article 113 of the Spanish Constitution

Concurrently, the Prime Minister was barred from dissolving the Cortes Generales and calling a general election while a motion of no confidence was pending. If the motion was successful, the incumbent prime minister and their government were required to submit their resignation to the Monarch, while the candidate proposed in the motion was automatically considered to have the confidence of the Congress of Deputies and immediately appointed as prime minister. If unsuccessful, the signatories of the motion were barred from submitting another during the same session.

The procedure for motions of no confidence was regulated within Articles 175 to 179 of the Standing Orders of the Congress of Deputies, which provided for the debate on the motion starting with its defence by one of the signatory members without any time limitations, to be followed by an also time-unlimited speech by the nominated candidate to explain their political programme. Subsequently, spokespeople from the different parliamentary groups in Congress were allowed to speak for thirty minutes, with an opportunity to reply or rectify themselves for ten minutes. Members of the government were allowed to take the floor and speak at any time of their request during the debate.

== The motion ==
=== Registration and support ===
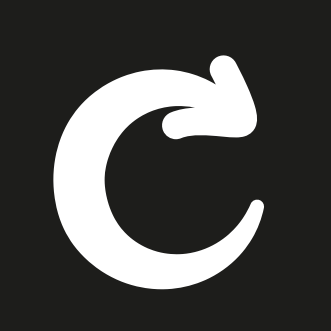
Promotional logo used by Podemos ahead of the motion.

On 19 May 2017, the motion was formally tabled by thirty-seven Unidos Podemos deputies, with Pablo Iglesias as the proposed candidate for prime minister. Iglesias invited the Spanish Socialist Workers' Party (PSOE) into an agreement but acknowledged that the initiative was likely to be defeated, claiming to know that he would not "come out as prime minister from this vote of no confidence, but it is my responsibility", despite the move entailing "enormous risks": while previous motions of no confidence held since the Spanish transition to democracy had also been defeated, the one in 1980 was successful in promoting the figure of Felipe González—said to be one of many contributing factors to his landslide win in the 1982 election—whereas the one in 1987 signaled the twilight of Antonio Hernández Mancha's political career. The motion promoters held a demonstration in Puerta del Sol, Madrid, on 20 May, where thousands gathered in support of the initiative.

Compromís enthusiastically welcomed the motion and announced their support to Unidos Podemos. Republican Left of Catalonia (ERC) was sympathetic to the initiative, but conditioned it on Podemos supporting an independence referendum to be held in Catalonia. This same condition was demanded by the Catalan European Democratic Party (PDeCAT), which nonetheless remained more skeptical and argued that they would "evaluate the pros and cons" of supporting the motion before taking a decision. EH Bildu showed their willingness to support the initiative if Podemos reassured their commitment to the "right to decide", which they had already contemplated in their election manifesto. The motion also received the support of trade unions UGT and CCOO, which voiced their "disappointment and sadness" with opposition parties not backing it.

=== Rejections and PSOE's stance ===
The PSOE initially announced that they would vote against the motion, arguing that it was an "intrusion" within the party's ongoing primaries. All three candidates for the party's leadership—Susana Díaz, Pedro Sánchez and Patxi López—rejected Podemos's move, perceiving it as being directed to their party rather than to Rajoy's. Interim PSOE leader Javier Fernández rejected Iglesias's attempts to discuss the initiative, despite the latter's offerings to back down in favour of a PSOE candidate. Citizens (Cs) ruled out supporting the motion and dubbed it as a "circus number", whereas the PP mocked the initiative as an "absurdity". PP's electoral partners, Navarrese People's Union (UPN) and Asturias Forum (FAC), were widely expected to oppose the motion, whereas Canarian Coalition (CCa) and New Canaries (NCa) hinted at their rejection as well. Members from the Basque Nationalist Party (PNV) dubbed the initiative as "an absolute awkwardness" and criticized Podemos for announcing the motion to the media without discussing it first with the rest of parties, while also stating that they were "not very convinced" of having Iglesias as an alternative candidate to Rajoy.

A new political scenario arose after Pedro Sánchez's sudden re-election as PSOE leader on 21 May, after he had hinted at registering a future motion of no confidence on Rajoy "if it was to win it" during his leadership election campaign. However, he made it clear that his party would not support Iglesias's one, both because the PSOE and not Unidos Podemos was the main opposition party to the PP and because "the numbers were not there" at the time for the motion to succeed. On 22 May, Pablo Iglesias offered Sánchez to withdraw Podemos's motion if he registered his own instead, but the PSOE rejected it and pointed to an abstention on the grounds that, while the party agreed with the motivations behind the motion, it did not with the way in which it had been brought forward. Some commented that, actually, Sánchez agreed with the motion but was privately upset that the initiative had not been his, while it was said that he had plans to table a motion of no confidence of his own by the end of 2017, awaiting in the meantime to consolidate its hold over the party.

=== Debate and vote ===
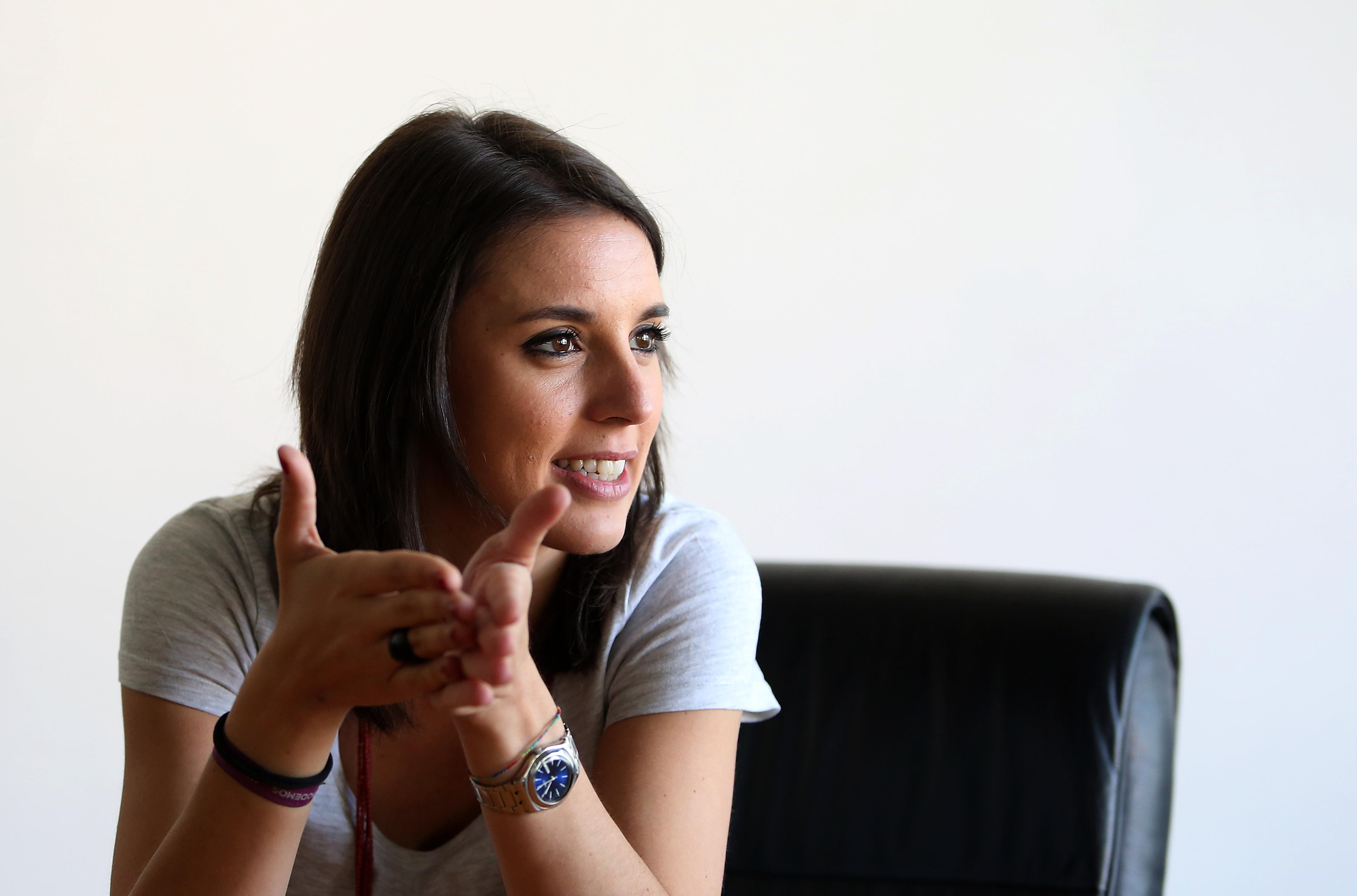
Unidos Podemos's spokesperson, Irene Montero, defended the motion as one of its signatory members.

The parliamentary debate and the vote on the motion were scheduled for 13 and 14 June. It started with a two hour-long speech by Unidos Podemos's parliamentary spokesperson, Irene Montero, and was followed by a surprise intervention from Prime Minister Mariano Rajoy, who had been widely expected not to participate in the debate himself. Pablo Iglesias's speech as candidate followed shortly thereafter, with both Rajoy and Iglesias staging a parliamentary duel which lasted for hours. Rajoy claimed that "a government of Iglesias would be a punishment for Spain", whereas Iglesias reminded the PP about their corruption scandals and offered the PSOE an alliance in the future that helped bring the PP government down.

The new PSOE spokesperson, José Luis Ábalos, maintained his party's stance on the motion and reminded Iglesias of his own stance during Sánchez's failed investiture in 2016, but thanked him "on his tone" and picked up his "invitation" for an understanding, without clarifying whether Sánchez would table a motion in the foreseeable future. ERC's spokesperson Joan Tardà praised Iglesias for his initiative and announced his party's support to the motion, whereas EH Bildu announced a "critical yes" on the grounds that it was "a priority to oust the most corrupt party in Europe from government" while demanding Iglesias his full support to the right of self-determination.

Motion of no confidence Congress of Deputies; Nomination of Pablo Iglesias (Podemos)
Ballot →	14 June 2017
Required majority →	176 out of 350
Yes: • UP–ECP–EM (67); • ERC (9); • Compromís (4); • EH Bildu (2)	82 / 350
No: • PP (134); • Cs (32); • UPN (2); • CCa (1); • FAC (1)	170 / 350
Abstentions: • PSOE (84); • PDeCAT (7); • PNV (5); • NCa (1)	97 / 350
Absentees: • PDeCAT (1)	1 / 350

As expected, the motion was defeated on 14 June 2017, having gathered the support of Unidos Podemos, Compromís, ERC and EH Bildu for a total of 82 support votes, 170 against and 97 abstentions.

== Opinion polls ==
Opinion polling conducted in the days leading to and during the events of the vote of no confidence showed a split support to the motion. Shown in reverse chronological order, with the most recent first and using the dates when the survey fieldwork was done, as opposed to the date of publication (except in cases where the fieldwork dates are unknown):

Opinion on the motion of no confidence
Polling firm/Commissioner	Fieldwork date	Sample size	Support	Reject	Neither	Question
Invymark/laSexta	5–9 Jun 2017	?	50.0	45.2	—N/a	4.8
Metroscopia/El País	29 May–1 Jun 2017	2,599	46.0	51.0	—N/a	3.0
Sigma Dos/El Mundo	8–10 May 2017	1,200	31.7	41.0	18.5	8.9
Invymark/laSexta	2–5 May 2017	?	47.8	47.0	—N/a	5.2

== Aftermath ==
Unidos Podemos's motion of no confidence became the third since the Spanish transition to democracy to be defeated, after the unsuccessful 1980 and 1987 ones. It was also the first motion of no confidence in Spain not to be tabled by the main opposition party at the time, a feat that would be repeated three years later when Vox registered their own motion on the government of Pedro Sánchez.

Despite its defeat, both Unidos Podemos and PSOE hinted during the debate at the possibility of a future understanding that could see them both working in a joint motion in the future. Such an invitation was offered by Iglesias who, during a reply to PSOE's spokesperson José Luis Ábalos, stated that Podemos would "commit [themselves] with the new PSOE in search of an alternative majority" and urged the Socialists to "work together on a motion of no confidence".

Eventually, one such motion would be tabled by Sánchez in May 2018 after the unveiling of a court ruling that found the PP to have profitted from the illegal kickbacks-for-contracts scheme of the Gürtel affair and confirmed the existence of an illegal accounting and financing structure that ran in parallel with the party's official one. The motion would be successful, leading to the downfall of Rajoy's government and the election of Pedro Sánchez as new prime minister.
