= 1982 vote of no confidence in the government of Helmut Schmidt =

1982 West German governing coalition collapse

- Date: 1st Oct 1982
- Location: Bundestag, West Germany
- Cause: Disagreements within the Third Schmidt cabinet over economic policy
- Participants: CDU; CSU; SPD; FDP
- Outcome: Motion passed.

On October 1, 1982, the West German Bundestag debated and passed a motion of no confidence in the government of Helmut Schmidt, the West German Chancellor since 1974, after the coalition agreement between the governing Social Democratic Party and Free Democratic Party collapsed over disagreements on economic policy. The motion resulted in the ascension of Christian Democratic Union leader Helmut Kohl as chancellor who would hold office until 1998.

== Legal provisions ==
Germany's Basic Law provides that a Chancellor can be removed mid-term by a constructive vote of no confidence if a majority of the Bundestag votes for confidence in an alternate candidate for Chancellor.

(1) The Bundestag may express its lack of confidence in the Federal Chancellor only by electing a successor by the vote of a majority of its Members and requesting the Federal President to dismiss the Federal Chancellor. The Federal President must comply with the request and appoint the person elected.
(2) Forty-eight hours shall elapse between the motion and the election.

— Article 67 of the Basic Law

== Background ==
The SDP-FDP coalition, first formed in 1969, had been growing apart since its re-election in 1980. Following Walter Scheel's election to the presidency, Hans-Dietrich Genscher was elected as the new leader of the Free Democratic Party. More conservative than his predecessor, he proved less willing to greenlight further government spending.

Tensions between the two parties worsened following the state elections in West Berlin in 1981, when the state FDP branch formed a coalition with the opposition Christian Democratic Union, under Genscher's orders.

Ongoing talks in the media of the coalition's frailty eventually compelled Schmidt to force his FDP ministers to resign on the 17th of September, which prompted Genscher to begin coalition negotiations with the CDU, which introduced a no-confidence motion against the government just two weeks later.

== Vote ==
Motion of no confidence Helmut Kohl (CDU)
Ballot →	October 1, 1982
Required majority →	249 out of 497
Yes	256 / 497
No	235 / 497
Abstensions	4 / 497
Absentees	2 / 497
Sources (Note: Vote totals per party are not available, as the vote took place under a secret ballot.)

== Aftermath ==
On October 13, two weeks after his ascension, Kohl gave his first policy statement where he called for the new government to take up a policy of renewal and pursue an "emergency program" for creating jobs and securing the welfare system. Kohl soon proposed a motion of confidence in his new government, which the CDU-FDP coalition deliberately voted against in order to allow for the dissolution of the Bundestag, and therefore the calling of snap parliamentary elections for March 1983 at which the new CDU/FDP coalition was re-elected.
