= 2018 vote of no confidence in the government of Mariano Rajoy =

Vote of no confidence against the prime minister of Spain

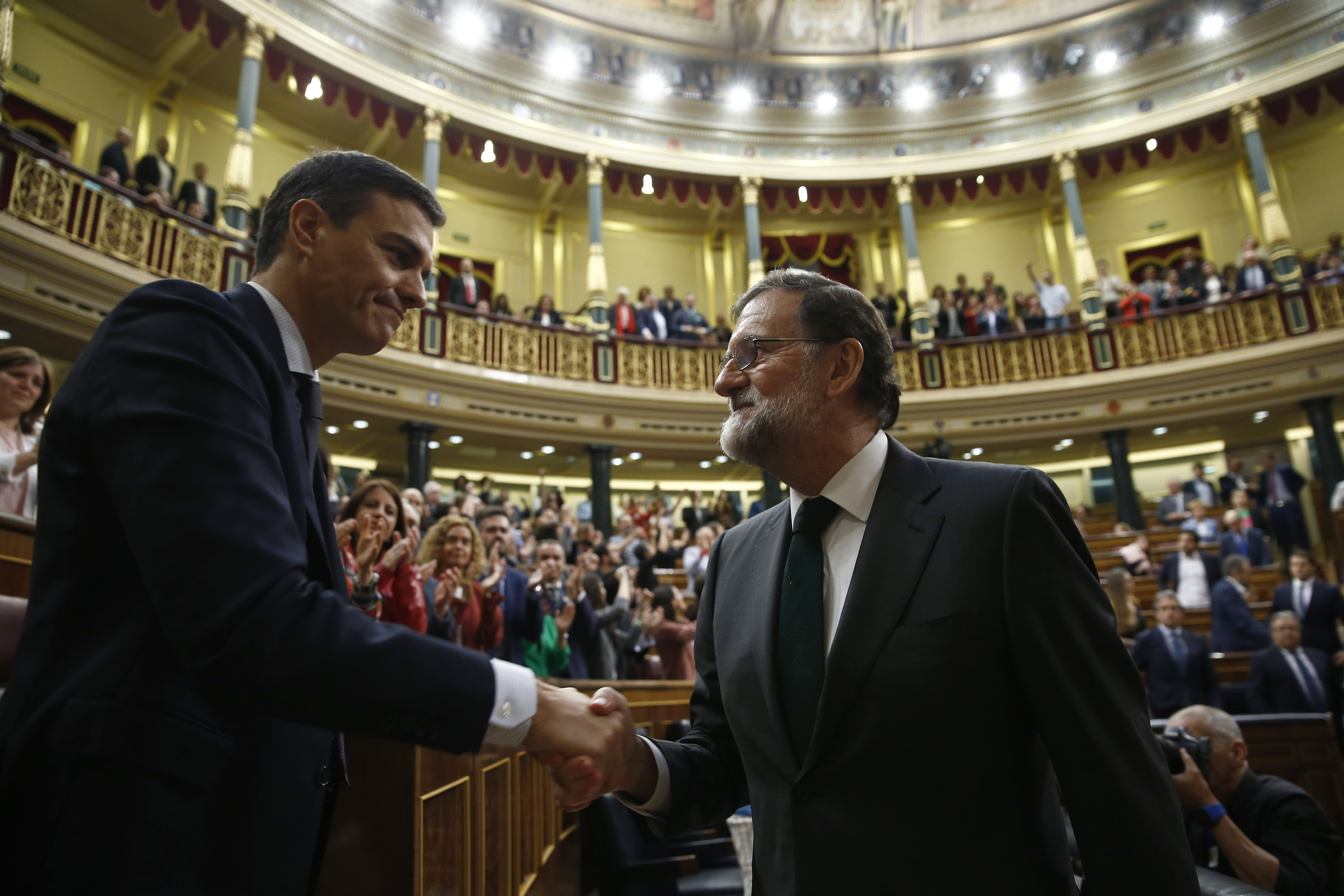
- Outgoing prime minister Mariano Rajoy (right) congratulating incoming prime minister Pedro Sánchez (left) upon losing the no confidence vote on 1 June 2018
- Date: 31 May – 1 June 2018 (1 day)
- Location: Congress of Deputies, Spain
- Type: Motion of no confidence
- Cause: The National Court's sentence on the Gürtel affair scandal affecting the People's Party (PP)
- Participants: PP; PSOE; Unidos Podemos; Cs; ERC; PDeCAT; PNV; Compromís; EH Bildu; UPN; CCa; FAC; NCa
- Outcome: Motion approved: Resignation of Mariano Rajoy and his government; Appointment of Pedro Sánchez as prime minister and formation of his first government

A motion of no confidence in the Spanish government of Mariano Rajoy was debated and voted in the Congress of Deputies between 31 May and 1 June 2018. It was brought by Spanish Socialist Workers' Party (PSOE) leader Pedro Sánchez after the governing People's Party (PP) was found to have profited from the illegal kickbacks-for-contracts scheme of the Gürtel affair in a court ruling made public the previous day. This was the fourth motion of no confidence made in Spain since the transition to democracy and the first one to be successful, as well the second to be submitted against Mariano Rajoy after Unidos Podemos's motion the previous year. Coincidentally, it was held 38 years after the first such vote of no confidence on 30 May 1980.

The motion passed with the support of 180 deputies—those of PSOE, Unidos Podemos, Republican Left of Catalonia, Catalan European Democratic Party, Basque Nationalist Party, Compromís, EH Bildu and New Canaries—and resulted in the downfall of Mariano Rajoy's government and in Pedro Sánchez becoming new Prime Minister of Spain. Public opinion at the time was found to be overwhelmingly in favour of the motion, as revealed by polling conducted in the days previous and during the events leading to the vote. Subsequently, on 5 June, Rajoy announced his resignation as PP leader and his withdrawal from politics after having led the party for 14 years, vacating his seat in parliament and returning to his position as property registrar in Santa Pola. Prior to his ouster, Rajoy had hinted at the possibility that he might not seek re-election for a third term in office, with his ultimate farewell sparking a leadership contest that would see Pablo Casado being elected as new party chairman.

Before the unveiling of the court ruling that led to the motion's tabling, the Citizens (Cs) party of Albert Rivera had been in the lead in opinion polling for the most part of 2018. Rivera's erratic attitude during the lead up to the motion and its ultimate result—which saw his party voting against it—were widely regarded by media and political commentators as causing political initiative to shift from Cs towards Sánchez's PSOE, which would go on to win all elections held over the next year: general, local, regional and to the European Parliament. The failed 2019 government formation process and the electoral repetition in November that year would ultimately see a collapse in support for Cs and Rivera's resignation as party leader.

== Background ==
The motion was registered by the Spanish Socialist Workers' Party (PSOE) on 25 May 2018, one day after the governing People's Party (PP) was found by the National Court during their investigation of the Gürtel affair to have profited from an illegal kickbacks-for-contracts scheme, with the confirmation of the existence of an illegal accounting and financing structure that ran in parallel with the party's official one since its foundation in 1989. The Court had ruled that the PP helped establish "an authentic and efficient system of institutional corruption via mechanisms to manipulate public tenders at the national, regional and local level", while judging that Mariano Rajoy had not been "truthful" in his testimony as a witness during the trial. The severity of the ruling had prompted Rajoy's then-major parliamentary ally, Citizens (Cs), to publicly withdraw its confidence and supply support from the government and proclaim it as marking "a before and an after" in Spanish politics, prior to the motion's tabling by the PSOE.

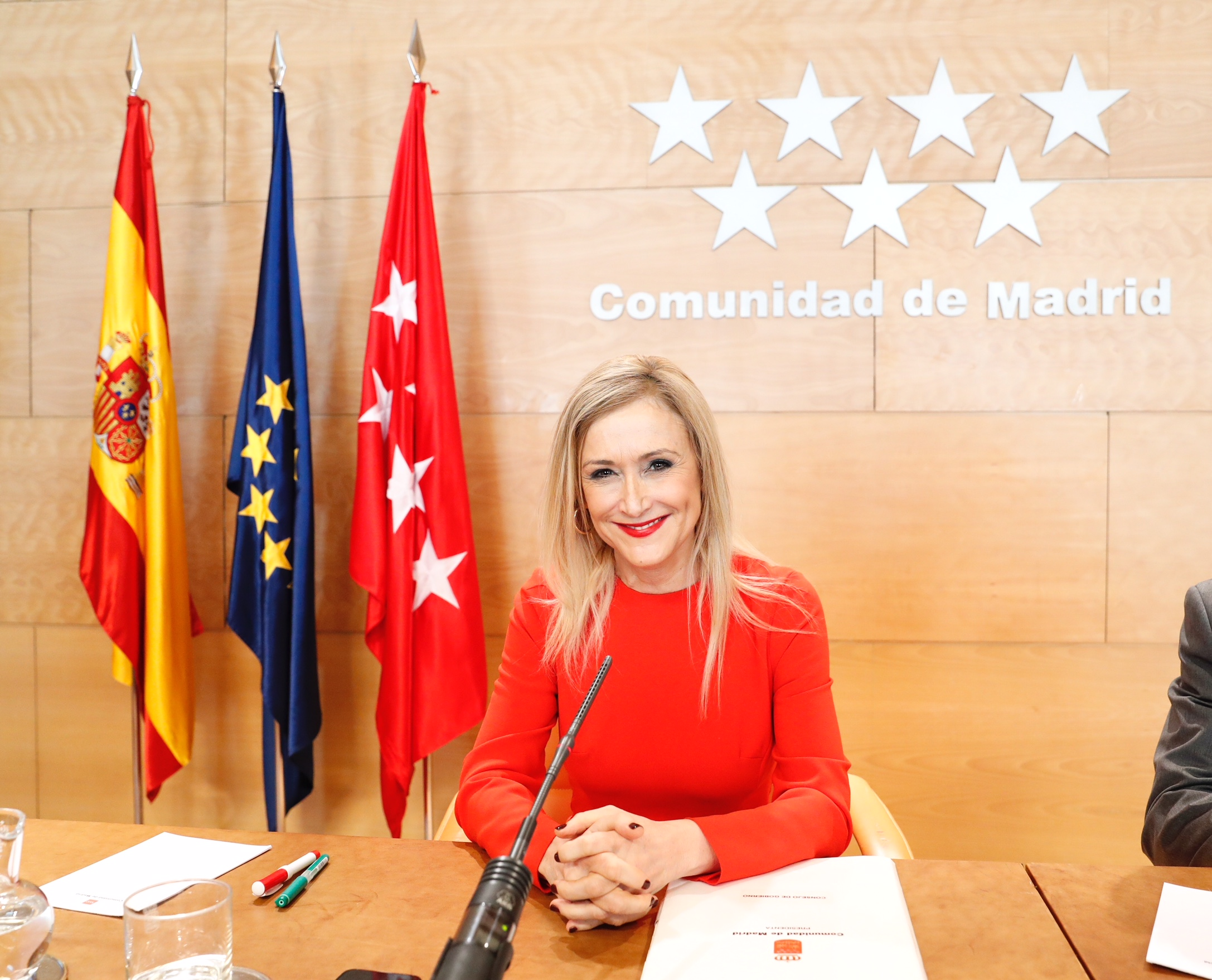
Madrid president Cristina Cifuentes during a press briefing on 17 April 2018, just over a week before she resigned.

The judicial ruling was the last in a series of corruption scandals that had beleaguered the minority PP government following the troubling 2016 government formation process. Joining the string of corruption investigations unveiled in April 2017—that had seen a previous, unsuccessful motion of no confidence being tabled by Unidos Podemos (the political alliance of Podemos and United Left) in June that year—was the transpiring of evidence in March 2018 that Madrilenian president Cristina Cifuentes could have obtained a master's degree in the King Juan Carlos University through fraudulent means, which evolved into a full-fledged scandal by April as both the university and Cifuentes's regional government were found attempting to cover up the scandal through document forgery. The affair, together with the leaking of a 2011 video showing her being detained in a supermarket for shoplifting, ultimately contributed to Cifuentes announcing her resignation on 25 April 2018. On 22 May, two days before the National Court's ruling on the Gürtel affair was made public, former Valencian president Eduardo Zaplana was arrested by the Civil Guard as a result of ongoing investigations for alleged money laundering and bribery crimes.

Since the tabling of Podemos's motion in June 2017, events other than corruption scandals had also contributed to the weakening of Rajoy and his government's image in society. Among others, the constitutional crisis starting in September 2017 over the Catalan government's attempt to hold an independence referendum contrary to the Constitution and diverse judicial rulings, as well as the enforcement of direct rule over Catalonia as a result. The subsequent 21 December regional election (which saw the more pro-union Cs benefitting from a plummeting in the PP vote) led to the former surging to first place in nationwide opinion polls as well as to an alienation of parties supportive of Catalan independence—namely, Republican Left of Catalonia (ERC) and the Catalan European Democratic Party (PDeCAT)—further away from the national government's positions. Cs's surge in opinion polls had also seen the fading out of the main opposition party, the PSOE, and its leader, Pedro Sánchez—not a deputy in Congress since his resignation as such in October 2016—who found himself needing to recover the political initiative for his party.

Finally, on 23 May 2018, the day before the ruling's publication, Mariano Rajoy and his government were able to get their budget for that year passed through the Congress of Deputies in a tight 176–171 vote, with the decisive support of the Basque Nationalist Party (PNV) having been secured through a last-hour deal. This was despite the latter having pledged not to do so as long as direct rule was being enforced over Catalonia, thus theoretically ensuring the stability of the government until 2020. Rajoy's continuity in power beyond that year had sparked an internal debate within the party, as he had hinted at the possibility that he might not seek re-election for a third term in office.

== Legal provisions ==
The Spanish Constitution of 1978 required for motions of no confidence to be proposed by at least one-tenth of the Congress of Deputies—35 out of 350. Following the German model, votes of no confidence in Spain were constructive, so the motion was required to include an alternative candidate for prime minister. For a motion of no confidence to be successful, it had to be passed by an absolute majority in the Congress of Deputies. A minimum period of five days from the motion's registration (dubbed as "cooling period") was required to pass before it could come up for a vote, but no maximum was established. Other parties were entitled to submit alternative motions within the first two days from the registration.

1. The Congress of Deputies may challenge Government policy by passing a motion of censure by an absolute majority of its members.
2. The motion of censure must be proposed by at least one tenth of the Deputies, including a candidate for the office of President of the Government.
3. The motion of censure may not be voted on until five days after it has been submitted. During the first two days of this period, alternative motions may be submitted.
4. If the motion of censure is not passed by the Congress, its signatories may not submit another during the same session.

— Article 113 of the Spanish Constitution

Concurrently, the Prime Minister was barred from dissolving the Cortes Generales and calling a general election while a motion of no confidence was pending. If the motion was successful, the incumbent prime minister and their government were required to submit their resignation to the Monarch, while the candidate proposed in the motion was automatically considered to have the confidence of the Congress of Deputies and immediately appointed as prime minister. If unsuccessful, the signatories of the motion were barred from submitting another during the same session.

The procedure for motions of no confidence was regulated within Articles 175 to 179 of the Standing Orders of the Congress of Deputies, which provided for the debate on the motion starting with its defence by one of the signatory members without any time limitations, to be followed by an also time-unlimited speech by the nominated candidate to explain their political programme. Subsequently, spokespeople from the different parliamentary groups in Congress were allowed to speak for thirty minutes, with an opportunity to reply or rectify themselves for ten minutes. Members of the government were allowed to take the floor and speak at any time of their request during the debate.

== The motion ==
=== Registration and reactions ===
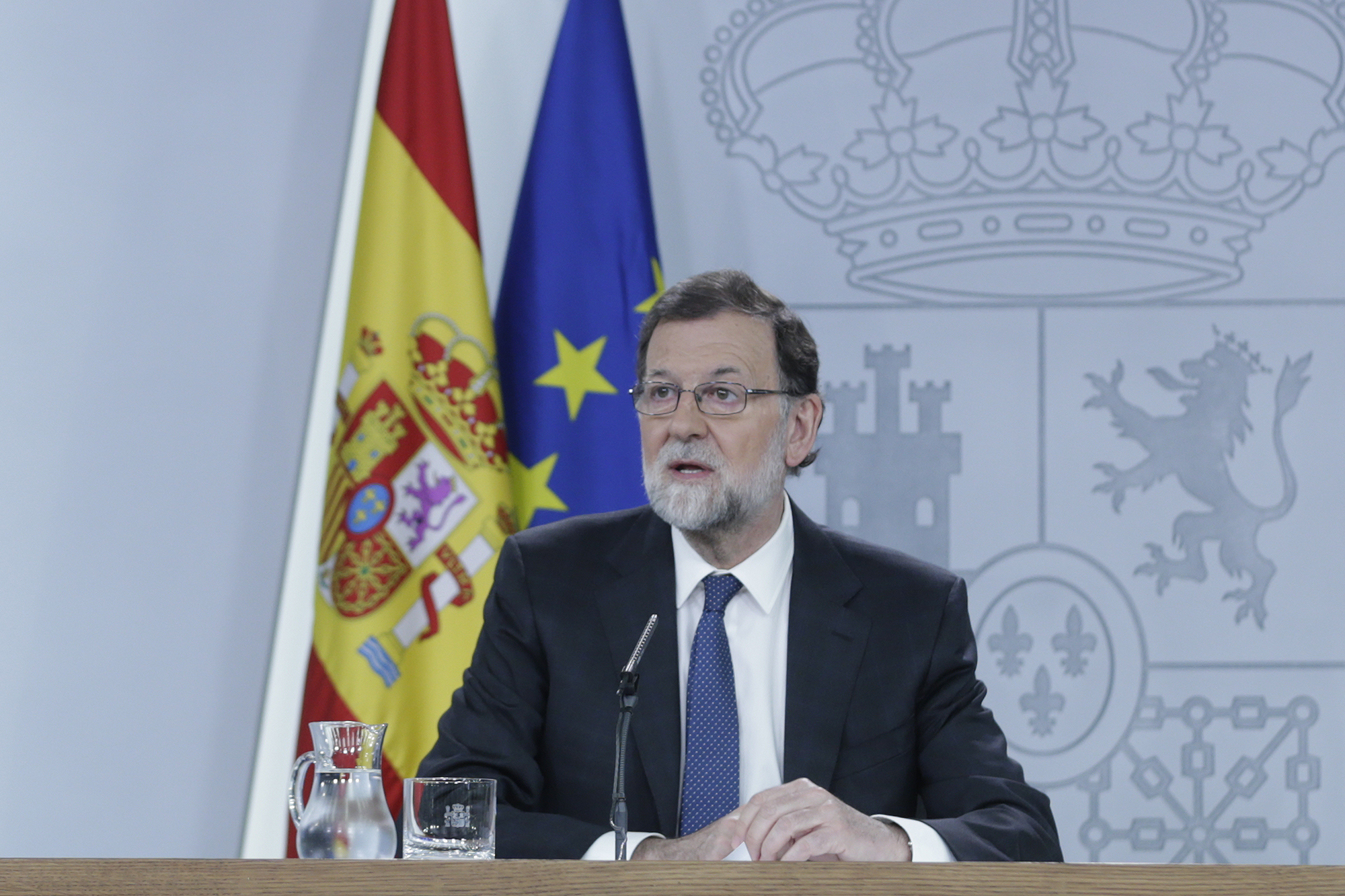
Rajoy in a press briefing in La Moncloa on 25 May 2018, assessing the tabling of the motion of no confidence by PSOE leader Pedro Sánchez earlier that day

Pedro Sánchez's decision to table the motion was taken in the hours following the publication of the court ruling on 24 May, having been persuaded to do so by his closest collaborators following the refusal from Mariano Rajoy and his government to give out any explanations or take any actions in response to the sentence. In accordance with the Constitution's requirements, the PSOE designated Sánchez as candidate for prime minister, who announced that, should the motion be successful, he would aim for the establishment of a "transitional government" that would ensure the country's "governance" and recover "democratic normality" in the wake of the huge political crisis sparked as a result of the Gürtel sentence and other scandals, then call for a snap general election. Unidos Podemos, Compromís and New Canaries (NCa) immediately announced their support of the initiative, with ERC and PDeCAT remaining undecided but inclined to support it if it had real prospects of succeeding. As for Cs's stance, despite the party having withdrawn its support from the Rajoy government as a result of the ruling, it was not supportive of the motion and instead demanded Rajoy dissolve parliament and hold an early general election.

Sources within the government and the PP acknowledged that the parliament's arithmetics meant that the motion could have a realistic chance of succeeding, as the support of PSOE and Unidos Podemos together with that of peripheral nationalist parties would be enough to win the vote. They also admitted having lost control over the legislature and did not rule out a snap election for late 2018 or early 2019 even if the government survived the vote. Rajoy was reportedly "deeply disgusted" with the move staged by Sánchez, with whom he had come to trust over the Catalan issue during the previous months. He cancelled his prime ministerial schedule and held a press briefing the day of the motion's announcement on 25 May, where he accused Sánchez of "seeking to govern with whoever at any cost" and of "lacking the moral legitimacy for tabling [the motion]".

=== Pressing negotiations ===
The debate and the vote on the motion of no confidence were scheduled by then-President of the Congress of Deputies Ana Pastor for 31 May and 1 June, a mere week after it was tabled—a stark difference with the 2017 one, which had been scheduled for three weeks after its registration—in what was regarded as a deliberate attempt to foil the initiative by preventing Pedro Sánchez from having enough time to negotiate the required parliamentary support that he needed to succeed. Initially, the PP was reported as being confident in surviving the vote due to Sánchez's contested leadership within his own party—still reeling from its 2016 internal crisis and the harsh contest of the 2017 leadership election—and the belief that they had the decisive support of the PNV after the latter had helped them pass the 2018 budget through parliament. Since it appeared unlikely for Sánchez to collect the support of such a heterogeneous grouping of parties in favour of his candidacy—going from the left-wing EH Bildu and Podemos to the centre-right PDeCAT and PNV—the belief settled among PP's ranks that the motion would fail.

Numerous inter-party meetings and phone calls took place between 25 and 30 May, seeing the PSOE sending their organization secretary, José Luis Ábalos, to probe the stance of other parties to the motion. Podemos's support was guaranteed—with the party having pledged to back any such initiative since its own attempt in 2017 and its leader, Pablo Iglesias, actively helping the PSOE in securing the support of other parties—whereas Cs had been discarded as a potential ally over its hostile position to allowing Sánchez's election as prime minister. Thus, securing the support of the PNV would be essential, as it would allow the numbers for the motion to reach the 176-seat threshold together with all other likely allies. The PNV was in a difficult position: in a U-turn move, it had just helped approve Rajoy's budget for 2018 in exchange for economic benefits for the Basque Country, but it did not want to be singled out as the "savior" of the unpopular Rajoy's government if the Catalan nationalist parties did back the motion, as that decision would not be understood by its voters. Thus, the positions adopted by ERC and the PDeCAT would prove determinant for the motion's fate.

ERC granted its unconditional support to the motion, seeking to oust Rajoy and the PP from government because of their enforcement of direct rule over Catalonia, but there were divisions within the PDeCAT as both former and incumbent Catalan presidents Carles Puigdemont and Quim Torra advocated for an abstention—and, thus, for the motion's failure. The more moderate sector led by the PDeCAT's coordinator-general Marta Pascal, who favoured Rajoy's ouster and urged party colleagues to vote accordingly, was able to swing the party's official stance into supporting the initiative.

=== Courting the PNV ===
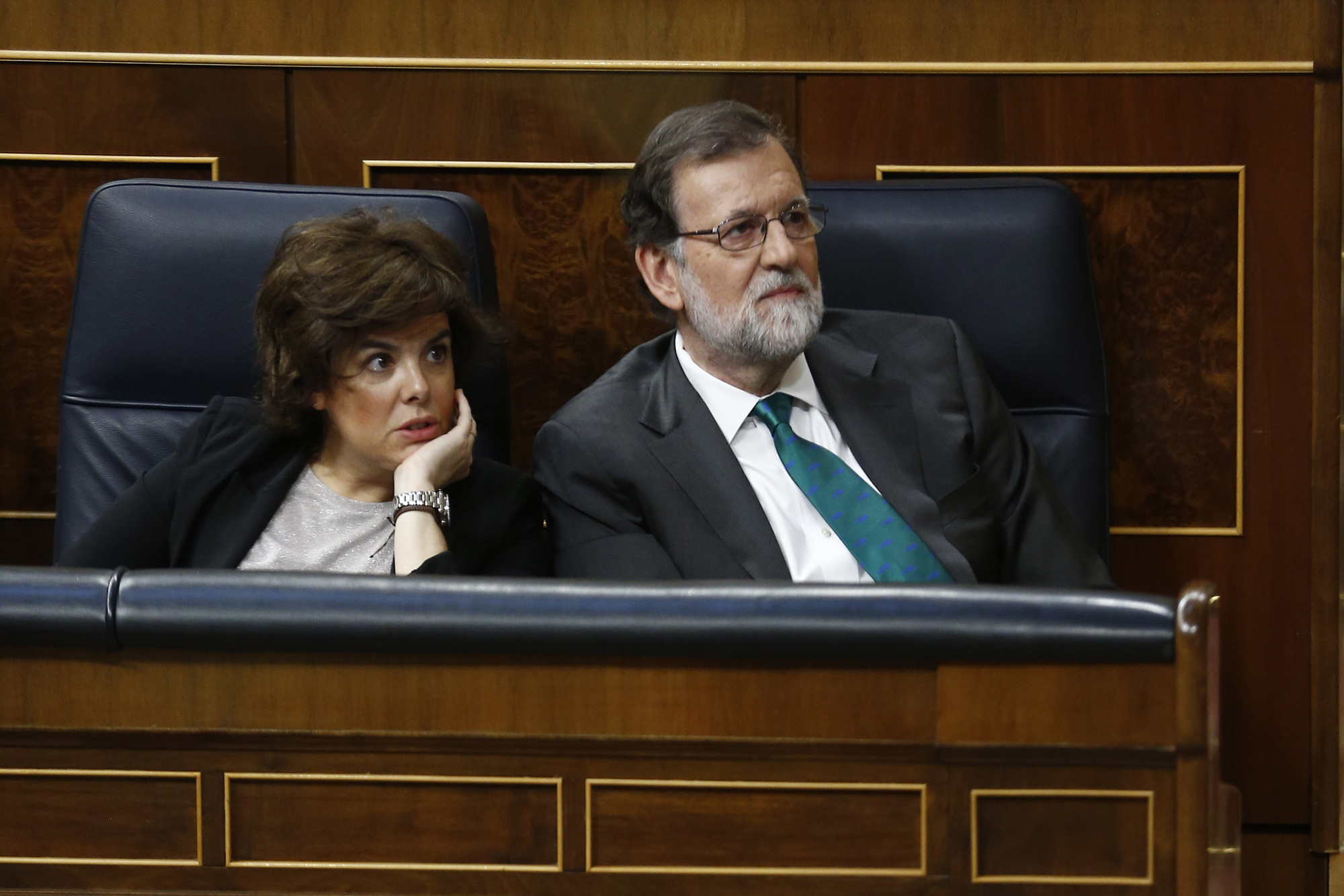
In one week, Rajoy's government had gone from securing the PNV's backing for its 2018 budget to seeing it swing in support of no confidence.

Attempts to pressure the PNV saw the PSOE accepting to call an early election as a way to make it appear as if it was trying to court Cs to its side, as well as Podemos leader Pablo Iglesias proposing to Cs leader Albert Rivera that, in the event of Sánchez's motion failing to succeed, then their both parties could join to sign an "instrumental" censure motion with the only goal of appointing an independent candidate who would then proceed to call a snap election, with such a proposal being well received by Rivera. This had the effect—unintended by Cs—of placing the PNV into the "losing" side if it did not support Sánchez's one, having to face the prospects of an eventual successful motion and a subsequent snap election anyway. By 29 May, Sánchez had secured the support of Podemos, Compromís, ERC, PDeCAT, EH Bildu and NCa, all swayed by their common opposition to Rajoy's government, meaning that Sánchez had 175 votes: exactly half of the chamber, one short of the legal threshold of 176 needed for the vote to succeed.

Facing the possibility of defeat, Rajoy himself attempted to personally persuade the PNV into remaining at his side, utilising his contacts with Confebask—the Basque Business Confederation, believed to be able to exert some influence on the final decision—to add to the pressure on the Basque party. However, the latter's leaders were already leaning towards supporting Sánchez's initiative, as a result of the combined efforts from PSOE and Podemos, the swing of ERC and the PDeCAT in favour of the motion and the belief that they could not politically justify be seen as the ones allowing Rajoy to stay in power.

On 31 May 2018, after having unsuccessfully suggested he resign as prime minister in order to call off the censure vote, the PNV reluctantly confirmed its support for the initiative, making Rajoy's defeat all but certain. The PP was thrown into a state of shock and disarray, as within one week the party went from having their budget for 2018 approved to suddenly face the prospects of the first successful vote of no confidence in democratic Spain. This would oust hundreds of party members from public office, forcing the whole party into opposition and thwarting Rajoy's plans for an orderly succession.

=== Debate and vote ===
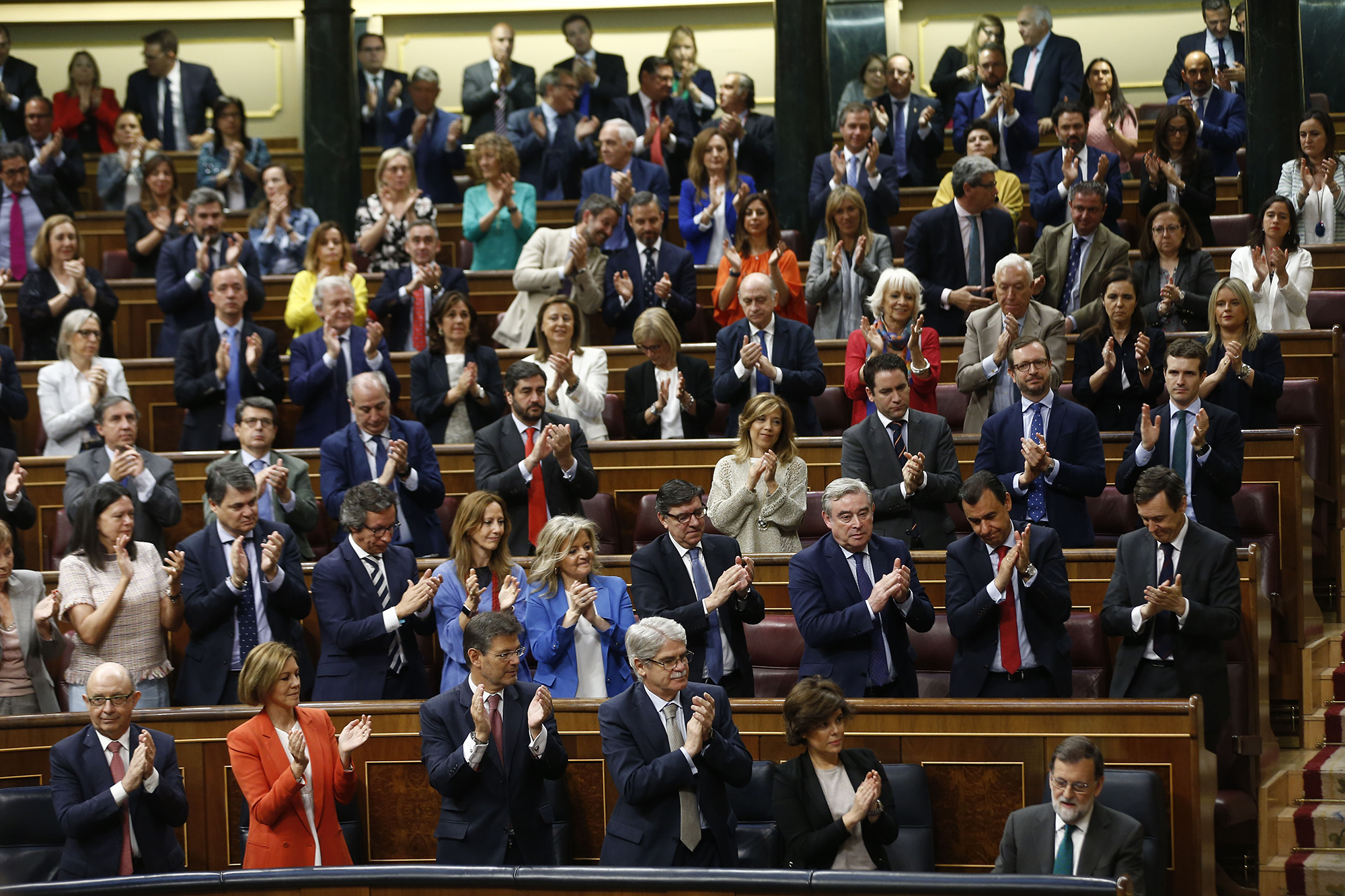
Rajoy (seated bottom right) with the PP parliamentary group in the Congress of Deputies during the motion's debate on 31 May 2018.

During the first part of the debate on 31 May, the motion was defended by PSOE's José Luis Ábalos, which was followed by Rajoy's reply and then by Sánchez's speech. Rajoy defended his over six year-timespan in government, attacked the PSOE for its "indulgence" of its own corruption scandals, warned about the alleged prejudices—both economic and political—that, in his opinion, the motion's passage would entail for the country and rejected the offers for him to resign as prime minister (a move which could have possibly allowed the PP to remain in power, but with himself out of government). At lunchtime, Rajoy retreated into the Arahy restaurant close to the Puerta de Alcalá, where he would stay until the night after receiving confirmation from the PNV that they would be supporting the motion, not returning to the Congress for the second part of the debate. Rajoy's absence, which came to be iconically—albeit unwittingly—symbolised by deputy prime minister Soraya Sáenz de Santamaría's placement of her handbag on the empty seat of the prime minister, was duly noted by various media and politicians at a time when it was becoming increasingly apparent that the motion would pass, with Pablo Iglesias commenting that "It's shameful that the prime minister's seat during a motion of no confidence is occupied by a handbag!". The next day, Rajoy went to parliament right before the vote to take the floor for one last time, stating that "it had been an honour to be prime minister of Spain" and wishing Sánchez "good luck" in his future role.

From the motion's announcement to its being voted upon, there was speculation in the media and within political circles on the Rajoy resignation hypothesis. While Rajoy had publicly rejected the idea of resigning, the viability of such scenario, coupled with the real chances of a motion success, led King Felipe VI to clear out his schedule for the week in order to remain reachable at the Zarzuela Palace in the event that he was required to sign a resignation or appointment decree. During Rajoy's absence from the second part of the parliamentary debate on 31 May, rumours spread throughout the Congress's hallways that he was about to resign in favour of his deputy prime minister, Sáenz de Santamaría. PP secretary-general and defence minister María Dolores de Cospedal, who was known as Sáenz de Santamaría's most ardent political rival both within the party and in government, came out to speak in a press conference that afternoon to publicly deny such rumours; "Mariano Rajoy is not going to resign," she said, "because it would not benefit the general interests of Spain and the PP."

Motion of no confidence Congress of Deputies; Nomination of Pedro Sánchez (PSOE)
| Ballot → | 1 June 2018 |
| Required majority → | 176 out of 350 |
| Yes: • PSOE (84); • UP–ECP–EM (67); • ERC (9); • PDeCAT (8); • PNV (5); • Compromís (4); • EH Bildu (2); • NCa (1) | 180 / 350 |
| No: • PP (134); • Cs (32); • UPN (2); • FAC (1) | 169 / 350 |
| Abstentions: • CCa (1) | 1 / 350 |
| Absentees | 0 / 350 |

On 1 June 2018, the motion of no confidence was voted on and approved with a 180–169 result. The sole abstention came from the Canarian Coalition, which had initially pledged its opposition to the motion but reneged at the last moment. As a result of the motion's approval, Rajoy was required to tender his resignation to the King, and Sánchez became prime minister.

== Opinion polls ==
Opinion polling conducted in the days leading to and during the events of the vote of no confidence showed large support for the motion. PSOE and Podemos voters were found to be overwhelmingly in support, whereas PP voters mostly rejected the move. In contrast, Cs voters were found to be more frequently divided on the issue, rejecting the continuity of Rajoy's government but not being supportive of a new cabinet headed by Sánchez. Shown in reverse chronological order, with the most recent first and using the dates when the survey fieldwork was done, as opposed to the date of publication (except in cases where the fieldwork dates are unknown):

Opinion on the motion of no confidence
| Polling firm/Commissioner | Fieldwork date | Sample size | Support | Reject | Neither | Question | Notes |
|---|---|---|---|---|---|---|---|
| YouGov/La Vanguardia | 29–31 May 2018 | 1,001 | 58.0 | 26.0 | —N/a | 17.0 | (Note: Question asked was "Do you see the motion of no confidence presented by Pedro Sánchez as correct?" 47% said "Yes, to call an election", 11% "Yes, for him to govern", 26% "No, in any case", 13% did not know and 4% did not answer.) |
| Invymark/laSexta | 28–29 May 2018 | ? | 58.6 | 38.1 | —N/a | 3.3 | (Note: Question asked was "How do you assess the motion of no confidence tabled by the PSOE against Mariano Rajoy?" 58.6% were "in favour", 38.1% "against" and 3.3% either did not know or did not answer.) |
| IMOP/El Confidencial | 25–27 May 2018 | 756 | 54.6 | 35.4 | 8.8 | 1.2 | (Note: Question asked was "Do you agree with the PSOE's decision to table a motion of no confidence against Mariano Rajoy?" 54.6% said "Yes", 35.4% "No" and 8.8% "Partly yes and partly no". Of those supporting the motion, 46.6% did want it to go forward even if it was with the vote of independentists whereas 8.0% did not. Of those not supporting the motion, 14.2% preferred a snap election, 13.0% still thought the PP was "the best government choice" and 7.9% did not want the PSOE to govern.) |
| ElectoPanel/Electomanía | 24 May 2018 | 514 | 89.9 | 10.1 | —N/a | —N/a | (Note: Question asked was "Should a motion of no confidence be tabled against Rajoy?" 89.9% said "Yes to the motion" and 10.1% "No to the motion".) |

== Aftermath ==
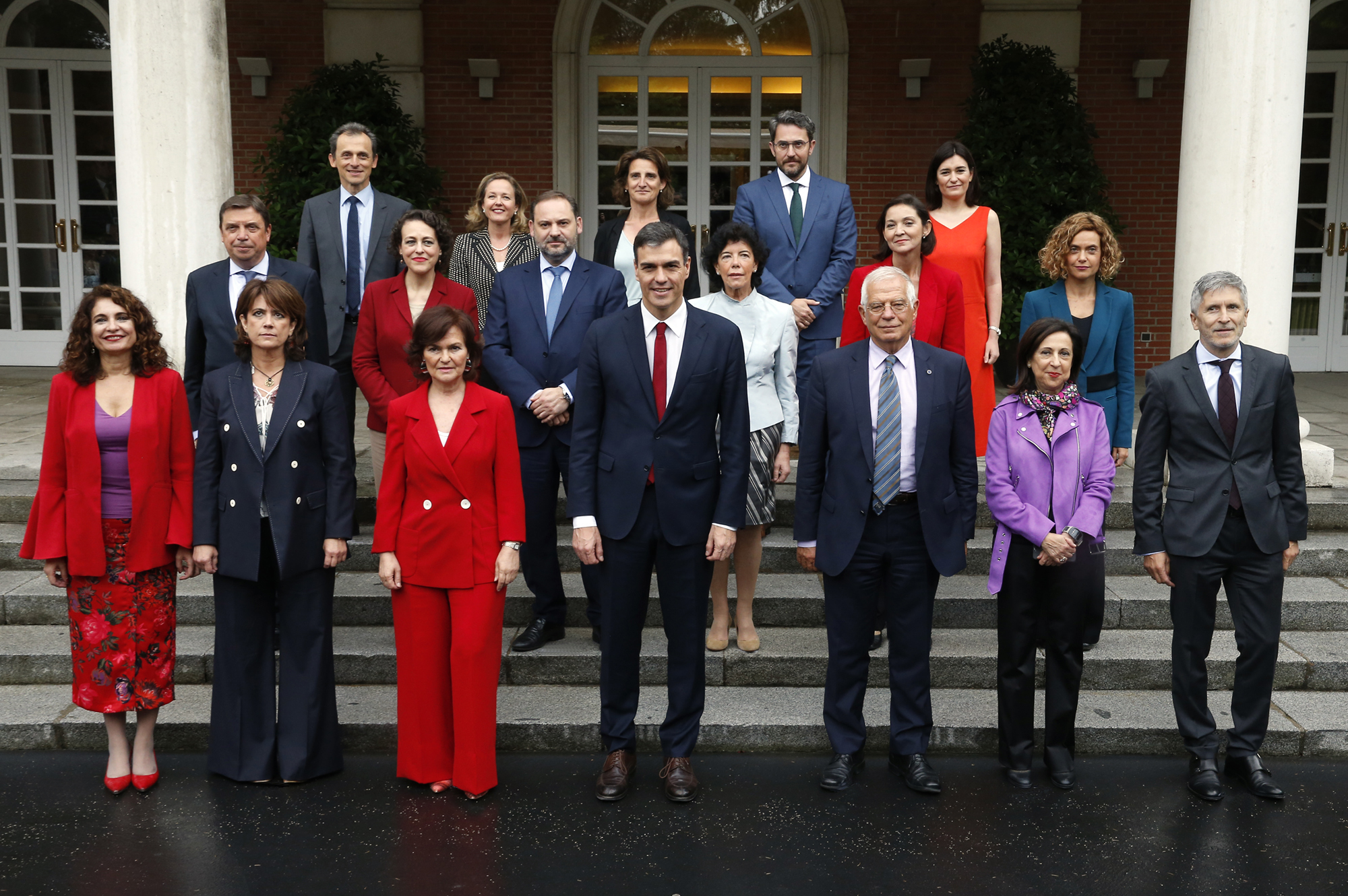
Cabinet photo of Pedro Sánchez's first government, 8 June 2018

With the passage of the motion—the first successful vote against a Spanish central government since the first such vote of no confidence on 30 May 1980, exactly 38 years earlier—Mariano Rajoy and his government were required to step down. As Sánchez was automatically deemed to have the confidence of parliament, he was formally appointed as prime minister later that day. Rajoy subsequently announced his resignation as PP leader and his retirement from politics on 5 June, triggering a leadership contest to determine his successor, whereas Sánchez would unveil his new cabinet two days later on 7 June. On 21 July 2018, the PP's hitherto vice secretary-general of communication and MP for Ávila, Pablo Casado, defeated Sáenz de Santamaría in a vote at the PP's national congress to succeed Rajoy as party leader.

Various media regarded it decisive that Rajoy and Congress speaker Ana Pastor had chosen to hold the vote immediately after the registration of the motion. Envisaged as a move aimed at thwarting the motion by limiting the time available for negotiations to occur, it instead led to opposition parties being forced to hastily decide their public stance on the vote. Without time for any clashes or disputes to take place over programmatic contents or political concessions—which could have ensued during a prolonged period of multi-party negotiations, potentially leading to the initiative's failure—parties contrary to the PP government found their common rejection of Rajoy's premiership as the sole deciding factor at stake, turning the vote into a sort of ultimatum on whether to accept or reject Rajoy rather than a consideration of Sánchez's potential candidacy. This had the effect of turning the motion, envisaged in the Spanish legal system as constructive, into a "destructive" one, precipitating the downfall of Rajoy and his government.

The motion's success had a sizeable impact in Spanish society. The PSOE, which had languished in opinion polls conducted prior to the events surrounding the motion, and which had not won an election at the national level since 2008, was propelled to first place nationally in opinion polling, going on to win the April 2019 general election as well as the May 2019 local, regional and European Parliament elections. In contrast, the PP continued its stark decline in public support, with disenchanted voters shifting to support the newly-resurgent far-right Vox party—a trend accentuated after Vox's surprise entry into the Parliament of Andalusia as a result of the December 2018 regional election. Vox eventually entered the national, European and many regional parliaments and local councils for the first time throughout 2019.

The result of the vote and the motion itself were also regarded as a major blow to Cs's strategical prospects, with the party going from leading most opinion polls during the first part of 2018 to being overshadowed by the new prime minister's rising popularity and media prominence. From that point onwards, Cs leader Albert Rivera—whose decision to promptly withdraw his party's support from Rajoy's government after the unveiling of the Gürtel sentence was said to unwittingly contribute to Sánchez's move to table the motion—lost the political initiative and, after a brief success in the April 2019 general election (in which his party came nine seats short of overcoming Casado's PP as the main opposition force in Spain), would be forced to resign and withdraw from politics following his party's meltdown in the election of November 2019.
