= 2020 vote of no confidence in the government of Pedro Sánchez =

Spanish parliamentary vote

- Date: 21–22 October 2020 (1 day)
- Location: Congress of Deputies, Spain
- Type: Motion of no confidence
- Cause: The Spanish government's alleged mismanagement of the COVID-19 pandemic
- Participants: PSOE; PP; Vox; Unidas Podemos; Cs; ERC; PNV; EH Bildu; Junts; PDeCAT; Más País; CUP; UPN; FAC; Compromís; CCa; NCa; BNG; PRC; TE
- Outcome: Motion rejected

A motion of no confidence in the Spanish government of Pedro Sánchez was debated and voted in the Congress of Deputies between 21 and 22 October 2020. It was brought by the far-right party Vox, on the grounds of an alleged mismanagement of the COVID-19 pandemic in Spain by Sánchez's government. It was the fifth motion of no confidence in Spain since the country's transition to democracy.

No party other than Vox (which had 52 deputies in the Congress) showed a willingness to support the motion, a fact that, coupled with parliamentary arithmetics—with Spanish right-from-centre parties commanding 153 out of the 176 seats required for it to pass even in the event that they coordinated themselves to support it—meant that it would fail in its attempt to bring down Sánchez's government. With the voting resulting in only 52 in support of the motion to 298 against, it became the least-supported motion of no confidence in Spanish history.

== Legal provisions ==
The Spanish Constitution of 1978 required for motions of no confidence to be proposed by at least one-tenth of the Congress of Deputies—35 out of 350. Following the German model, votes of no confidence in Spain were constructive, so the motion was required to include an alternative candidate for prime minister. For a motion of no confidence to be successful, it had to be passed by an absolute majority in the Congress of Deputies. A minimum period of five days from the motion's registration (dubbed as "cooling period") was required to pass before it could come up for a vote, but no maximum was established. Other parties were entitled to submit alternative motions within the first two days from the registration.

1. The Congress of Deputies may challenge Government policy by passing a motion of censure by an absolute majority of its members.
2. The motion of censure must be proposed by at least one tenth of the Deputies, including a candidate for the office of President of the Government.
3. The motion of censure may not be voted on until five days after it has been submitted. During the first two days of this period, alternative motions may be submitted.
4. If the motion of censure is not passed by the Congress, its signatories may not submit another during the same session.

— Article 113 of the Spanish Constitution

Concurrently, the Prime Minister was barred from dissolving the Cortes Generales and calling a general election while a motion of no confidence was pending. If the motion was successful, the incumbent prime minister and their government were required to submit their resignation to the Monarch, while the candidate proposed in the motion was automatically considered to have the confidence of the Congress of Deputies and immediately appointed as prime minister. If unsuccessful, the signatories of the motion were barred from submitting another during the same session.

The procedure for motions of no confidence was regulated within Articles 175 to 179 of the Standing Orders of the Congress of Deputies, which provided for the debate on the motion starting with its defence by one of the signatory members without any time limitations, to be followed by an also time-unlimited speech by the nominated candidate to explain their political programme. Subsequently, spokespeople from the different parliamentary groups in Congress were allowed to speak for thirty minutes, with an opportunity to reply or rectify themselves for ten minutes. Members of the government were allowed to take the floor and speak at any time of their request during the debate.

== Events ==
=== Prelude ===
The motion was announced by Vox leader Santiago Abascal during a Congress plenary debate on 29 July 2020, justifying it on the basis of an alleged mismanagement of the COVID-19 pandemic in Spain on the part of Sánchez's government. Despite hints at fielding a "prestigious independent candidate", failure in finding a suitable alternative candidate led to the motion's tabling being delayed until 29 September and in Abascal himself being nominated to defend the party's programme.

=== Party positions ===
Aside of the governing parties—the Spanish Socialist Workers' Party (PSOE) and Unidas Podemos—and barring any major position change, it was expected to meet with the opposition of Republican Left of Catalonia (ERC), the Basque Nationalist Party (PNV), EH Bildu, Together for Catalonia (JxCat), the Catalan European Democratic Party (PDeCAT), Más País, Commitment Coalition (Compromís), New Canaries (NCa), the Galician Nationalist Bloc (BNG) and Teruel Existe. During the first debate, the Regionalist Party of Cantabria (PRC), the Popular Unity Candidacy (CUP), the Navarrese People's Union (UPN) and Canarian Coalition (CCa) also announced their negative vote.

Citizens (Cs) also announced its 'No' vote to the motion, which it dubbed as "the most useless thing in politics". The People's Party (PP) announced that it would not be supporting the motion either, but debated on whether to abstain or vote against it. In the second day of debate, its leader Pablo Casado announced that his party would cast a "No" vote.

=== Debate and vote ===
Motion of no confidence Congress of Deputies; Nomination of Santiago Abascal (Vox)
Ballot →	22 October 2020
Required majority →	176 out of 350
Yes: • Vox (52)	52 / 350
No: • PSOE (120); • PP (88); • UP–ECP–GeC (35); • ERC (13); • Cs (10); • PNV (6); • EH Bildu (5); • JxCat (4); • PDeCAT (4); • Más País (2); • CUP (2); • UPN (2); • Compromís (1); • CCa (1); • NCa (1); • BNG (1); • PRC (1); • FAC (1); • TE (1)	298 / 350
Abstentions	0 / 350
Absentees	0 / 350

== Opinion polls ==
Opinion polling conducted in the days during and after the events of the vote of no confidence showed a large opposition to the motion. Shown in reverse chronological order, with the most recent first and using the dates when the survey fieldwork was done, as opposed to the date of publication (except in cases where the fieldwork dates are unknown):

Opinion on the motion of no confidence
Polling firm/Commissioner	Fieldwork date	Sample size	Support	Reject	Neither	Question
Redlines/Vozpópuli	23 Oct 2020	?	26.3	71.5	—N/a	2.3
Sigma Dos/El Mundo	22–23 Oct 2020	1,000	13.6	55.5	25.6	5.4
ElectoPanel/Electomanía	16–19 Sep 2020	1,632	35.7	64.3	—N/a	—N/a
