= 1987 vote of no confidence in the government of Felipe González =

Spanish parliamentary vote

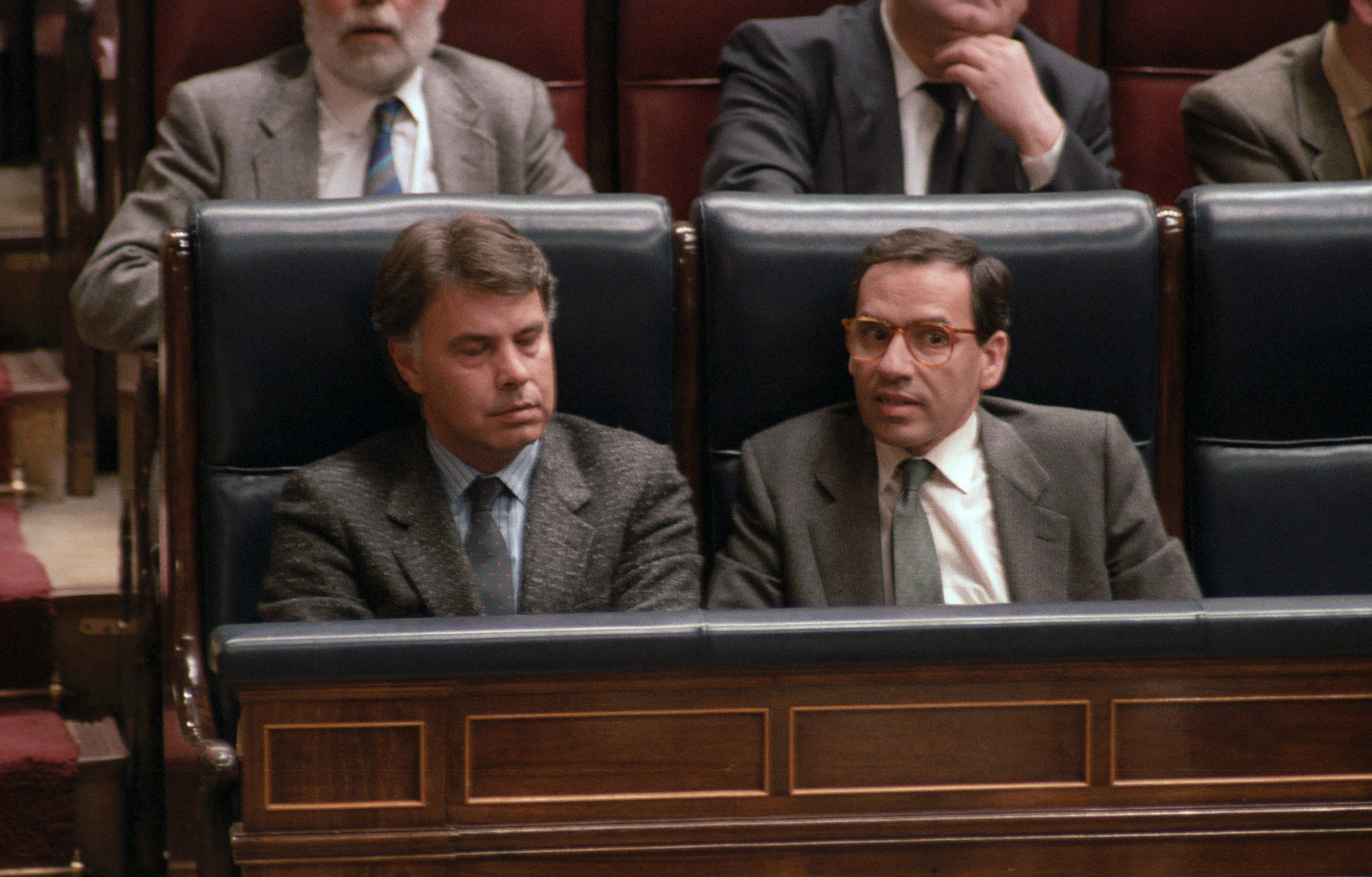
- Prime minister Felipe González (left) and deputy prime minister Alfonso Guerra (right) in their seats during the debate on the motion of no confidence on 26 March 1987
- Date: 26–30 March 1987 (4 days)
- Location: Congress of Deputies, Spain
- Type: Motion of no confidence
- Cause: The social conflict throughout the 1986–87 winter and the election of Antonio Hernández Mancha as new People's Alliance (AP) leader
- Participants: PSOE; AP; PDP; CiU; CDS; PL; IU; PNV; EE; RD; PD; CG; PAR; AIC; UV; Independents
- Outcome: Motion rejected

A motion of no confidence in the Spanish government of Felipe González was debated and voted in the Congress of Deputies between 26 and 30 March 1987. It was brought by People's Alliance (AP) leader Antonio Hernández Mancha, motivated on the "deteriorating situation of the country" as a result of the social conflict sparked throughout the 1986–87 winter between the governing Spanish Socialist Workers' Party (PSOE) and its erstwhile allied Workers' General Union (UGT), which had grown increasingly critical of González's economic policies. However, its true motives were attributed to Mancha's need for public promotion as both AP and opposition leader after his recent election to the post, as well as to his party's perceived urge to vindicate its primacy within the centre-right political spectrum in Spain amid the internal crisis that had been beleaguering it in the previous months.

The motion was soundly defeated by the absolute majority held by the PSOE in the Congress. It only secured the votes of two parties, AP and Valencian Union (UV), with the other 15 parties either voting against or abstaining and many deputies not attending the vote at all. Having been unable to secure any significant support outside of his group, harshly criticized by other opposition parties and seeing some notorious gaffes during his speech, political commentators promptly came to regard the motion as a huge political blow for Hernández Mancha's career, who ultimately ended up retiring from politics in 1989.

== Background ==
The conservative People's Coalition had broken up following disappointing results in the 1986 Spanish general election: first with the departure of the People's Democratic Party (PDP) from the coalition's parliamentary groups in July 1986, then with the Liberal Party (PL) following suit in January 1987. Dissensions within the People's Alliance (AP) had also seen the splitting of Jorge Verstrynge and Carlos Manglano in October to form the Democratic Renewal party (RD), and of Gabriel Camuñas and Carlos Ruiz Soto into the Democratic Party (PD) in December.

Concurrently, following the electoral defeat in the Basque regional election held in November that same year, Manuel Fraga resigned as AP leader on 1 December, being replaced by Antonio Hernández Mancha—until then the leader of the party in Andalusia—on 7 February. However, by the time of Mancha's election, his party's parliamentary group in the Congress of Deputies had been reduced to 67 members out of the 105 that the People's Coalition had secured in the 1986 election. Additionally, Hernandez Mancha was not a deputy but a senator, which meant that he was unable to engage Prime Minister Felipe Gonzalez directly during debates, limiting this ability to reach out to the general public as leader of the opposition.

Finally, Fraga's resignation had prompted former prime minister Adolfo Suárez and his Democratic and Social Centre (CDS) party to attempt an electoral expansion at the expense of AP in the upcoming 1987 local, regional and European Parliament elections, ultimately envisaging the former overcoming the latter as the main opposition party in Spain.

== Legal provisions ==
The Spanish Constitution of 1978 required for motions of no confidence to be proposed by at least one-tenth of the Congress of Deputies—35 out of 350. Following the German model, votes of no confidence in Spain were constructive, so the motion was required to include an alternative candidate for prime minister. For a motion of no confidence to be successful, it had to be passed by an absolute majority in the Congress of Deputies. A minimum period of five days from the motion's registration (dubbed as "cooling period") was required to pass before it could come up for a vote, but no maximum was established. Other parties were entitled to submit alternative motions within the first two days from the registration.

1. The Congress of Deputies may challenge Government policy by passing a motion of censure by an absolute majority of its members.
2. The motion of censure must be proposed by at least one tenth of the Deputies, including a candidate for the office of President of the Government.
3. The motion of censure may not be voted on until five days after it has been submitted. During the first two days of this period, alternative motions may be submitted.
4. If the motion of censure is not passed by the Congress, its signatories may not submit another during the same session.

— Article 113 of the Spanish Constitution

Concurrently, the Prime Minister was barred from dissolving the Cortes Generales and calling a general election while a motion of no confidence was pending. If the motion was successful, the incumbent prime minister and their government were required to submit their resignation to the Monarch, while the candidate proposed in the motion was automatically considered to have the confidence of the Congress of Deputies and immediately appointed as prime minister. If unsuccessful, the signatories of the motion were barred from submitting another during the same session.

The procedure for motions of no confidence was regulated within Articles 175 to 179 of the Standing Orders of the Congress of Deputies, which provided for the debate on the motion starting with its defence by one of the signatory members without any time limitations, to be followed by an also time-unlimited speech by the nominated candidate to explain their political programme. Subsequently, spokespeople from the different parliamentary groups in Congress were allowed to speak for thirty minutes, with an opportunity to reply or rectify themselves for ten minutes. Members of the government were allowed to take the floor and speak at any time of their request during the debate.

== The motion ==
=== Registration ===
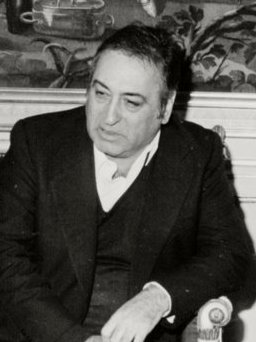
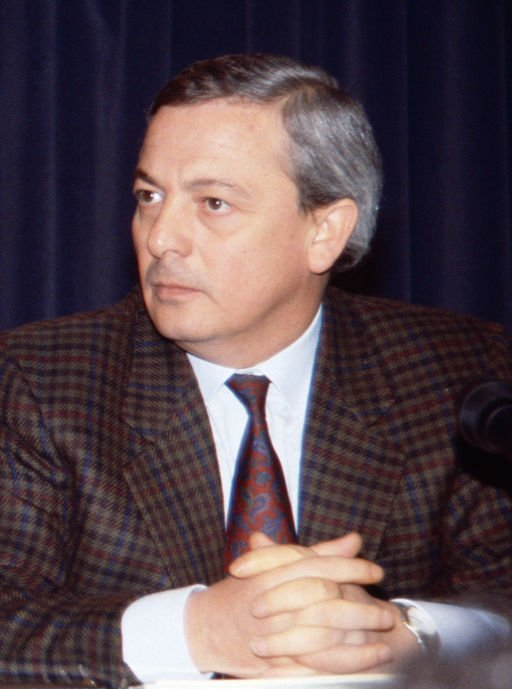
The clash between UGT secretary-general and Congress deputy Nicolás Redondo (left) and Economy minister Carlos Solchaga (right) over the issue of salary hikes in a televised debate on 19 February 1987 evidenced the widening gap between the PSOE government and trade unions. Redondo would end up vacating his seat in October that year.

The motion was officially tabled on 23 March 1987 by fifty-one AP deputies, with Hernández Mancha as the proposed candidate. The text of the motion justified it in the following six motives:

- "poor functioning of state services";
- "ineffective economic management";
- "ineffectiveness and inadequacy of the Central Administration";
- "erratic foreign and defense policy";
- "hegemonic and interventionist attitude of the State"; and
- "absence of proper channels for dialogue with social movements".

More specifically, the latter was attributed to the ongoing social conflict between González's government and trade unions—including the historically PSOE-aligned Workers' General Union (UGT)—since the end of 1986 and into the spring of 1987, over growing criticism of González's economic policies.

The initiative was criticized by several parties, including the ruling Spanish Socialist Workers' Party (PSOE), because of the motion's mathematical impossibility of succeeding as a result of the latter commanding an eight-seat absolute majority in the Congress of Deputies (counting the five deputies from Herri Batasuna who refused to take their seats), while also being dubbed as an opportunistic exercise of political self-promotion because of the close proximity of the 1987 local and regional elections.

=== Schedule ===
The debate's schedule was set for 26–27 March, whereas the vote itself was not expected to take place until after the weekend, on 30 March, in order to respect the five-day timetable set down by the Constitution. This was the first and—to date—only time that the vote on a motion of no confidence in Spain would not be held immediately after the debate.

AP's spokesperson in Congress Juan Ramón Calero had advocated for the debate to be postponed to next week so as not to interrupt the "unity of act" between the debate and the vote, but the government pushed through its own schedule thanks to its parliamentary majority. This led Calero to claim that this had been done "so as to cast off the feeling of censorship that our initiative implies", but he reluctantly accepted it so as to not give the impression that Hernández Mancha needed more time for preparation. The CDS, the PDP, United Left (IU) and the Regionalist Aragonese Party (PAR) supported the view that the debate and the vote should respect the unity of act of the parliamentary meeting, whereas Convergence and Union (CiU) had been favourable to the debate being held as early as possible, with the latter stance being the one that prevailed.

=== Debate and vote ===
In his defense of the motion previous to Mancha's speech as candidate on 26 March, Calero argued on its motives that when the governing party commanded an absolute majority in the chamber, the motion of no confidence fulfilled a subsidiary control purpose, which was the main reason behind his group's proposal. After laying out his programme, Hernández Mancha was received with widespread criticism from other parties: those in opposition condemned AP's attitude of not having reached out to them previously to ask for their support to the motion, whereas González's government remained mostly silent in the first day of debate—except for the formal reply to the speeches by Calero and Mancha, which was borne to deputy prime minister Alfonso Guerra—allegedly "out of respect for the other spokespeople", but in reality because of considering that the one being examined was Hernández Mancha and not the prime minister. In his reply, Guerra mocked Mancha by dubbing his speech as "the discourse of the old, reactionary right, clothed in populism".

In the second day of debate, Felipe González took the floor to disapprove of Mancha's performance and criticize his alleged contradictions, the "lack of consistency" of his programme and "the insufficient information" that he had collected on the issues addressed in his speeches. The replies from AP's leader were notorious because of a number of gaffes: a first one in which he erroneously claimed that then-foreign minister Francisco Fernández Ordóñez had been a cabinet member under Adolfo Suárez during the censure motion of May 1980—Fernández Ordóñez had not been appointed to the cabinet until September that year—and another one when he mistakenly attributed to Saint Teresa of Jesus a quote from Lope de Vega when addressing the CDS parliamentary group and Suárez himself, which forced the latter—who had initially rejected to participate in the debate—to take the floor himself to refute it, as well as to reject the alleged political motivation of the motion.

Motion of no confidence Congress of Deputies; Nomination of Antonio Hernández Mancha (AP)
Ballot →	30 March 1987
Required majority →	176 out of 350
Yes: • AP (66); • UV (1)	67 / 350
No: • PSOE (181); • IU (6); • PNV (4); • EE (2); • AIC (1)	194 / 350
Abstentions: • PDP (20); • CiU (19); • CDS (16); • PL (9); • RD (2); • PD (2); • PAR (1); • CG (1); • Independent (1)	71 / 350
Absentees: • HB (5); • CDS (4); • PSOE (3); • EA (2); • AP (1); • PDP (1); • PL (1); • IU (1)	18 / 350
Sources (Note: The Journal of Sessions of the Congress incorrectly summarizes the motion's results as 66 support votes, 195 against and 71 abstentions, a count which was replicated by several media outlets at the time. However, the more accurate manual count of the deputies' choices gives a 67–194–71 result instead.)

The motion was defeated by an overwhelming margin, with just 67 votes in favour—those of AP and Valencian Union (UV)—194 against and 71 abstentions, with 18 absentees (including the 5 members of Herri Batasuna who had not taken their seats). Several of the opposition parties were in disagreement with the government's policy and González's management of the country, but their level of dissatisfaction was not such so as to openly support Mancha's investiture as alternative prime minister, prompting many of these parties to abstain instead. The supportive stance of UV's only member in Congress also led to discomfort setting among the more moderate and centrist sectors within the party, which had unsuccessfully advocated for an abstention in the vote. The refusal of the PDP and PL to support the motion—the latter of which had taken the decision that same day, on the grounds that it had been tabled untimely and unilaterally—prompted AP to break up all relations with these two parties in the short term.

== Opinion polls ==
Opinion polling conducted in the days during and after the events of the vote of no confidence showed a large opposition to the motion, though the Diario 16 poll recorded 70.4% of AP voters in favour of it. Shown in reverse chronological order, with the most recent first and using the dates when the survey fieldwork was done, as opposed to the date of publication (except in cases where the fieldwork dates are unknown):

Opinion on the motion of no confidence
Polling firm/Commissioner	Fieldwork date	Sample size	Support	Reject	Neither	Question	Notes
CIS	1–2 Apr 1987	2,505	22.0	44.0	—N/a	34.0	(Note: Question asked was "As you may know, a motion of no confidence has been discussed in Congress in recent days. Do you generally agree or disagree with this motion, in which the People's Alliance proposed the removal of Felipe González as prime minister and his replacement by Antonio Hernández Mancha?" 22% said that they "generally agreed", 44% that they "generally disagreed", 31% did not know and 3% did not answer.)
Diario 16	29 Mar 1987	?	25.5	50.5	—N/a	24.0	(Note: Question asked was on whether the motion's tabling was considered as appropriate. 25.5% said "yes" and 50.5% "no".)
Demoscopia/El País	28 Mar 1987	2,000	26.0	34.0	—N/a	40.0	(Note: Question asked was "Do you think the People's Alliance has done well or poorly by tabling this motion of no confidence against the government?" 34% said that AP did "poorly" and 26% that it did "well".)

== Aftermath ==
Antonio Hernández Mancha regarded the motion and the vote as a success in "consolidating [AP] as the sole alternative of government", not ruling out the proposal of future, similar motions. However, the motion's opportunity, Mancha's lackluster performance in the debate and his oversized defeat—including the refusal from AP's erstwhile allies (PDP and PL) or that of its split members (RD and PD) to back him—would go down in history as a massive political blunder that, ultimately, would cost him his political career.

A number of factors were said to contribute to Hernández Mancha's failing to secure any political gain from the debate. Firstly, that he was a newcomer to national politics—having been appointed as AP leader barely two months earlier—coupled with the fact that the ruling PSOE rushed the debate on the motion to the earliest possible date allowed under law, which meant that Mancha had little time to prepare himself against the well-experienced Felipe González and Alfonso Guerra. Secondly, the prime minister's choice not to intervene until the second day of debating further weakened Mancha's ability to stage the parliamentary duel he sought, with his speech being mostly panned by the spokespeople of other minor parties. From that point, movements were set in motion within his party to replace him as leader, ultimately seeing Manuel Fraga forcing him out of politics in January 1989 and prompting the refoundation of AP—together with the PDP and PL—into the People's Party (PP) that same month.

A different interpretation of the motion's consequences was that it was partly successful in allowing AP to recover the political initiative ahead of the June 1987 local and regional elections, where the party held out as the main opposition force in Spain despite the electoral growth of the CDS. Later on, Hernández Mancha would reveal that he had not tabled the motion against González, but against Suárez, weary that the right-wing electorate could succumb to tactical voting in favour of the latter—much more widely known and popular than himself—as a result of the political vacuum left by Fraga's resignation.

In any case, the 1987 motion has come to go down in the recent history of Spain, in contraposition to the 1980 one, as the exemplification of the political risks than an ill-fated vote of no confidence can entail for the candidate tabling it.
