= Constructive vote of no confidence =

Variation on the motion of no confidence

The constructive vote of no confidence (German: konstruktives Misstrauensvotum, Spanish: moción de censura constructiva) is a variation on the motion of no confidence that allows a parliament to withdraw confidence from a head of government only if there is a positive majority for a prospective successor. The principle is intended to ensure governments' stability by making sure that a replacement has enough parliamentary support to govern.

The concept was introduced on a national scale in West Germany's 1949 constitution, which remains in force after the German reunification; it has been adopted since the 1970s in other nations like Spain, Hungary, Lesotho, Israel, Poland, Slovenia, Albania, and Belgium.

== Germany ==
Governments in the post-WW1 Weimar Republic were very unstable. Since the only election threshold for the Reichstag was that a party had to have received at least 30,000 votes in a single district, it was possible to get a seat with as little as 0.1 percent of the vote (e.g., People's Justice Party in July 1932). This resulted in a fragmented parliament, making it difficult for a government to retain a majority. Furthermore, as the German Empire had not been a parliamentary system, the politicians who had served in the pre-war Reichstag had little experience with coalition governments, which were an absolute necessity given the fractured political landscape. The parties representing the political center-left – the Social Democratic Party (SPD), Centre Party and Progressive People's Party – had come together for the Reichstag Peace Resolution during World War I and had experience with cross-party cooperation through the Inter-Party Committee (de:Interfraktioneller Ausschuss), but those efforts were directed against the government of the emperor and chancellor, not the work of a coalition of parties supporting a government agenda with difficult Realpolitik considerations. The three parties made up what was called the Weimar Coalition and formed four of the early cabinets under the new Weimar Constitution. Especially from 1925 on, however, Germany was governed by center-right coalitions that included the German People's Party (monarchist and thus opposed to the Weimar Coalition in 1919) as well as the Centre Party and the center-left German Democratic Party, with either the Social Democrats or the far right German National People's Party joining the coalitions or providing confidence and supply to a minority government.

=== Background: No-confidence motions prior to 1949 ===
Under the German Empire (1871–1918), the chancellor was appointed or dismissed exclusively by the emperor, leaving the Reichstag with no formal mechanism of removing the chancellor, and therefore pressuring them. When Theobald von Bethmann Hollweg had drawn the ire of the Reichstag majority over his handling of the Zabern Affair, they passed a vote of censure against him, but the Emperor wanted him to stay, and the Reichstag had no recourse in the matter. The Weimar National Assembly that wrote the Weimar constitution explicitly inserted a provision that the chancellor needed the confidence of the Reichstag. The constitution also contained a strong Reich president who was authorized to appoint and remove the chancellor (Article 53). A Weimar Republic chancellor thus needed the support of both the president and the Reichstag and neither needed to present a workable alternative when the chancellor was dismissed. This proved especially problematic after the 1925 German presidential election made Paul von Hindenburg president. He was a strongly conservative monarchist who frequently clashed with and tried to undermine the SPD, the party that held the most seats in the Reichstag from 1919 to 1932. In the less than 14 years of the Republic, there was a succession of 14 Chancellors with 20 governments. All of the transitions under Reich President Friedrich Ebert of the SPD (in office 1919 to 1925) were made collegially with the cooperation of the Reichstag. Under Ebert, however, the emergency provisions of Article 48, which allowed the Reich president to take emergency measures without the prior consent of the Reichstag, was used 136 times, frequently to deal with political violence and economic emergencies. It was only after 1925 that the use of Article 48 led to the imposition of cabinets dependent on the confidence of the president, Paul von Hindenburg. The instability was helped by and seen as contributing to the rise of the Nazi Party. After the 1930 German Reichstag election there was no longer any workable government majority due to the Communist Party of Germany (then holding on to the social fascism thesis and thus unwilling to form a popular front government) and the Nazi party holding 184 out of 577 seats between them and frequently cooperating on motions to disrupt procedures and hamper the government. After the July 1932 German Reichstag election, the Nazis and Communists combined had 319 out of 605 seats, giving them the power to vote down any motion and dismiss the government through a vote of no confidence without being able (or willing) to propose any constructive measures of their own.

The Free State of Prussia (by far Germany's largest and most populous) had a slightly different constitutional setup which required a positive majority in favor of a new government to unseat the sitting government. Otto Braun of the Social Democrats served as Prime Minister of Prussia from 1920 until the 1932 Prussian coup d'état with only two interruptions, providing much more democratic stability in Prussia than at the Reich level.

=== Legislative framework in 1949 constitution ===
To prevent the type of instability seen on the Reich level during the Weimar Republic and taking a cue from the Prussian model, two provisions were included in the 1949 German constitution, the Basic Law (Grundgesetz) They stipulate that Bundeskanzler (Federal Chancellor), as the function is now called, may be removed from office by majority vote of the Bundestag ("Federal Diet", the German Federal Parliament) only if a prospective successor also has the support of a majority:

Article 67. (1) The Bundestag can express its lack of confidence in the Federal Chancellor only by electing a successor with the majority of its members and by requesting the Federal President to dismiss the Federal Chancellor. The Federal President must comply with the request and appoint the person elected.
(2) Forty-eight hours must elapse between the motion and the election.

Article 68. (1) If a motion of a Federal Chancellor for a vote of confidence is not assented to by the majority of the members of the Bundestag, the Federal President may, upon the proposal of the Federal Chancellor, dissolve the Bundestag within twenty-one days. The right to dissolve shall lapse as soon as the Bundestag with the majority of its members elects another Federal Chancellor.
(2) Forty-eight hours must elapse between the motion and the vote thereon.

As a result, the failure of a motion of confidence does not automatically force either the resignation of the cabinet or a new election. Rather, the cabinet may continue as a minority government if there is not a positive majority for a prospective successor. At the same time, the Bundestag can't be dissolved unless a motion of no confidence has passed; this was meant as a way to prevent the incumbent Chancellor from strategically calling a new election (such as when the party or coalition they belong to is higher in the polls). Indeed, a dissolution is allowed only after the cabinet has formally lost parliamentary support.

This mechanism of triggering early elections was used four times at the federal level, in 1972 after Willy Brandt narrowly survived an attempt to unseat him, in 1983 after Helmut Kohl wished to cement his ascension via constructive vote of no confidence (the FDP had switched from supporting Helmut Schmidt and the SPD to backing Kohl and the CDU/CSU two years after the 1980 German federal election), in 2005 when Gerhard Schröder wished to obtain a new mandate from the electorate in the face of falling poll numbers, criticism from members of his own party and the loss in the 2005 North Rhine-Westphalia state election (a state his party had governed since 1966) and in 2024 when the FDP broke the coalition with SPD and Alliance 90/The Greens led by Olaf Scholz.

In 2005, president Horst Köhler at first hesitated to grant Schröder's request to dissolve the Bundestag, he ultimately did so and the German Federal Constitutional Court refused to undo Köhler's action as it deemed the issue a political question tacitly endorsing the new convention.

For a motion of no confidence, a majority of all Bundestag members is needed to elect a new chancellor, so not participating in the vote has the same effect as voting no (or abstaining). This was of importance in the first, ultimately unsuccessful use of this instrument.

Also, the Federal President may dissolve the legislature only after the failure of a motion of confidence, and the legislature may not dissolve itself either. This provision is intended to limit the power of the President. One consequence of this is that in contrast to many other parliamentary democracies, the Chancellor does not petition the President to dissolve the legislature. Rather, a Chancellor needs to (deliberately) lose a motion of confidence in order to force a snap election.

While Carlo Schmid is generally considered the main contributor to this constitutional innovation, the concept was actually introduced after World War I in the Free State of Prussia. It was a major reason why Prussia was governed by a stable centre-left coalition without interruption from 1919 to 1932 in contrast to the instability of the national governments.

=== History of use ===
Since 1949, two constructive votes of no confidence have been attempted (both by CDU against SPD), and only the second was successful.

Date	Opposition candidate	Chancellor	All deputies (Note: Discounting the 22 deputies for West Berlin who did not have voting right and did not count for the majority.)	Majority needed	Yes	No	Abstention	absent/invalid	Result
27 April 1972	Kurt Georg Kiesinger (CDU)	Willy Brandt (SPD)	496	249	247	10	3	236	failed
1 October 1982	Helmut Kohl (CDU)	Helmut Schmidt (SPD)	497	249	256	235	4	2	successful

==== 1972: Kurt Georg Kiesinger vs. Willy Brandt (failed vote) ====
On 27 April 1972, an attempt to oust Chancellor Willy Brandt (SPD) in favour of opposition leader Kurt Georg Kiesinger (CDU) failed by only two votes. This came as a surprise since it was known that several members of the SPD-FDP coalition strongly opposed Brandt's Ostpolitik and the government no longer had a clear majority after several deputies either switched over to the opposition or announced they would vote for the no-confidence motion. The numerous defections theoretically dropped the coalition to just 246 votes. The opposition nominally had 250, one vote over the 249 needed to topple Brandt.

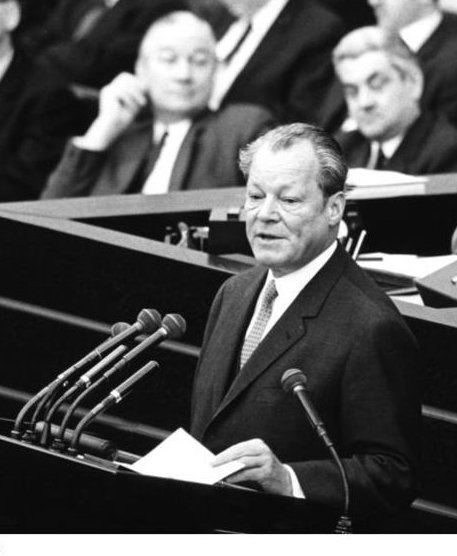
Willy Brandt, 1971 in the German Bundestag

The voting was influenced by tactics. The law on Bundestag Rules of Procedure specifies that the Chancellor is elected in a secret ballot, which applies in the motion of no confidence as well. To hamper their "faithless" deputies from voting for Kiesinger, the leadership of the SPD urged them not to participate in the vote; since a majority of all deputies is needed for a successful vote, not participating has the same effect as voting no, and it can be checked or enforced unlike secret ballot. Only the members of government and a few protesting coalition deputies (several from FDP, only Günter Müller from SPD) went to the voting booth, the first to ensure that dissenting deputies from CDU might remain secret.

Despite this, Brandt believed he was finished, and the SPD had girded itself to be consigned to opposition. A number of unions went on strike in anticipation of Brandt's defeat. In the end, only 260 votes were cast: 247 with yes, 10 with no, 3 abstaining; the remaining 236 were either absent or invalid. It was thus clear that the missing votes were within the CDU faction. In June 1973, CDU member Julius Steiner admitted to Der Spiegel magazine to have abstained from voting. Later, he claimed to have received 50,000 DM in return from one of the leading SPD figures, Karl Wienand. Leo Wagner of the CSU was suspected to have received a bribe as well, but conclusive evidence could not be found. After the 1990 German reunification, it became clear that the bribe money that was offered to several CDU politicians came from the East German Stasi (secret police), who at the time saw a need for Brandt to stay in power. That is somewhat ironic since Brandt's Ostpolitik is today seen as one of the major steps that eventually led to the implosion of East Germany in 1989. Brandt in turn would resign only two years later over the Guillaume affair which involved one of his personal assistants having been a Stasi spy.

However, as the government was no longer backed by a majority in parliament, on 22 September, Chancellor Brandt proposed a Motion of confidence to the Bundestag. He lost intentionally to make way for the 1972 West German federal election in November, which he won decisively.

==== 1982: Helmut Kohl vs. Helmut Schmidt (successful vote) ====
On 1 October 1982, Helmut Schmidt was voted out of office in favor of Helmut Kohl, marking the end of the SPD-FDP coalition. The vote was much easier than the 1972 one since it was clear that the FDP wanted to switch over to the CDU. Indeed, the FDP was already in negotiations at the time the vote happened. The FDP was no longer content with SPD economic policy and at the same time, the SPD was internally divided over NATO stationing of nuclear missiles in Germany. Still, the vote succeeded by a majority of only seven votes.

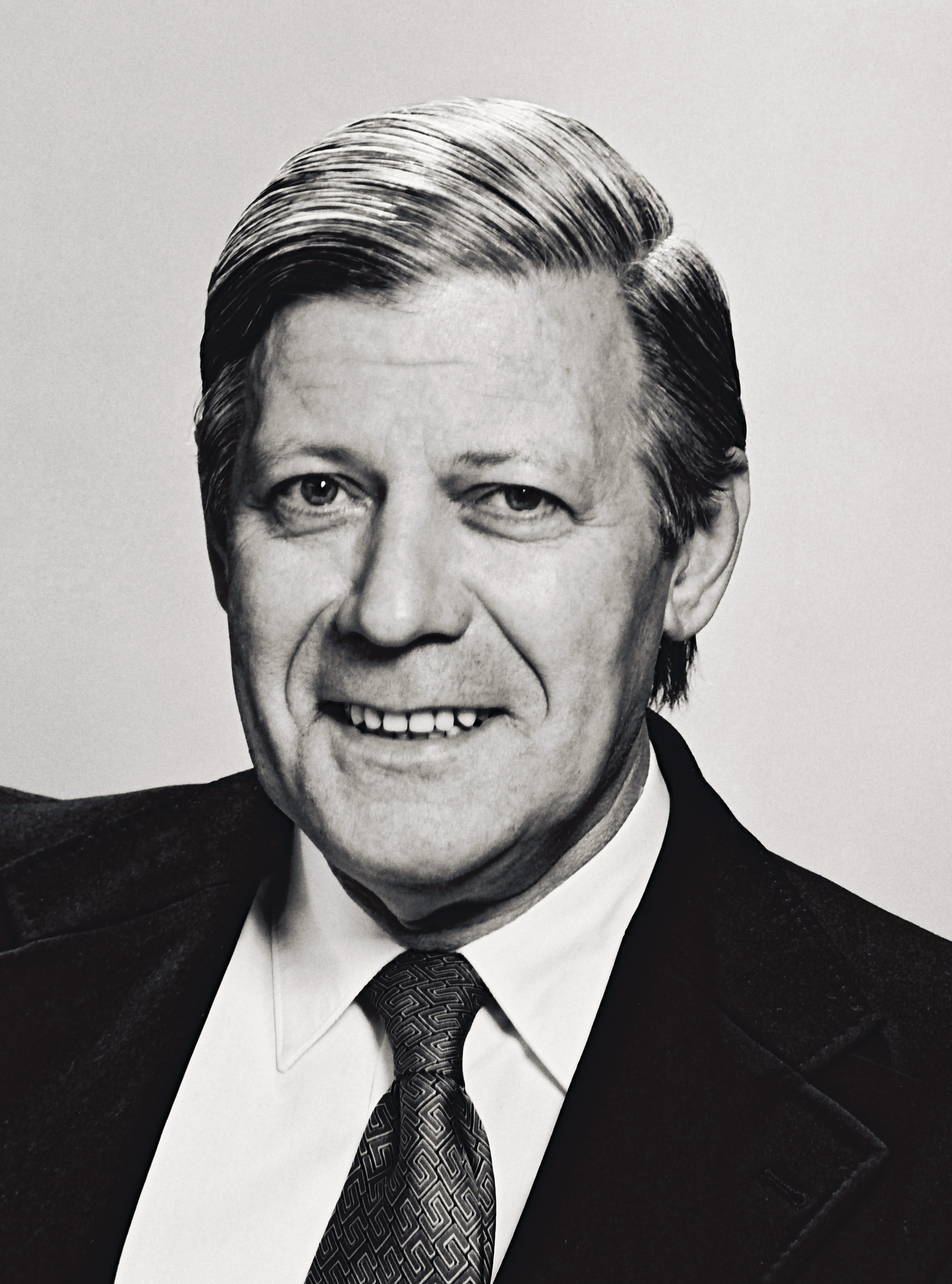
German Chancellor Helmut Schmidt was the first head of government to be overthrown by a constructive vote of no confidence.

To obtain a clearer majority in the Bundestag (which seemed to be in reach according to the polls), after the vote, Helmut Kohl put up a motion of confidence in which the new CDU-FDP coalition intentionally voted against the Chancellor that it just put into power. This trick allowed for the dissolution of the Bundestag according to Article 68 of the Grundgesetz (see above). Still, the action triggered an appeal by four deputies to the Federal Constitutional Court, which, in a somewhat helpless ruling that February, upheld the move. The court emphasized this was only acceptable if the Chancellor has reason to believe he cannot continue to effectively govern with the current balance of power. It decided Kohl could believe this since the FDP was not only deeply divided by the change of coalition but had already agreed to early elections, meaning in theory that it no longer had to support the government. The new Bundestag was elected in March 1983, yielding a strong majority for the new coalition, which eventually lasted until 1998.

== Spain ==
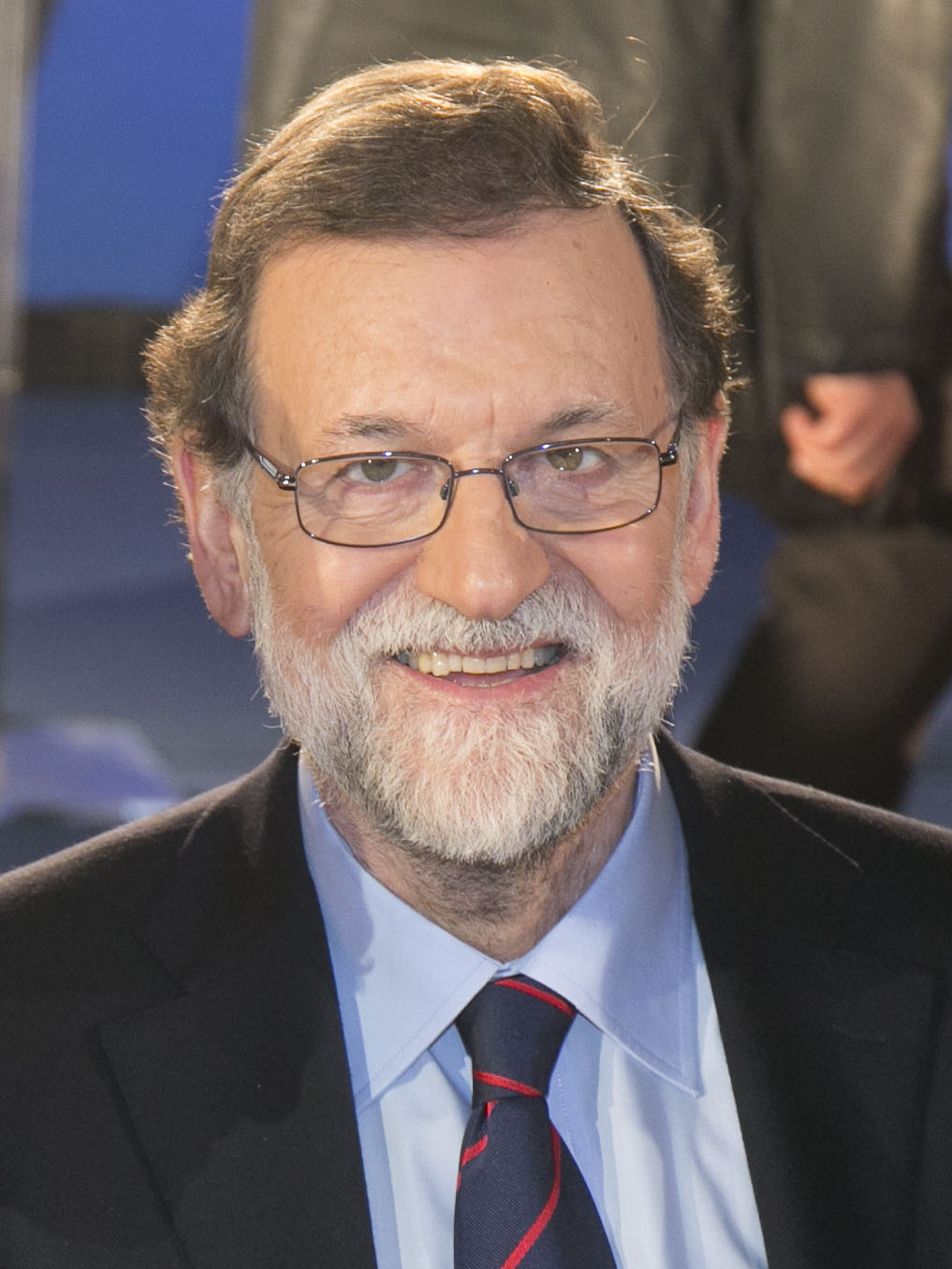
Mariano Rajoy was the first prime minister in Spain's political history to be removed by a constructive vote of no confidence.

A very similar system to the German one was adopted in the new Constitution of Spain of 1978 for the national Cortes (parliament) and also came into force in territorial assemblies (parliaments/assemblies of autonomous communities). Despite Spanish constitutional history being very different from that of Germany (and Spain deciding to have the monarchy protected by an entrenched clause while Germany had been a Republic since 1919), the German Basic Law was seen as "success model" at the time and this is just one of several provisions the framers of the Spanish constitution lifted wholesale from the German model. Some, like the equivalent of the controversial Article 155 of the Spanish constitution which deals with Federal execution have never been used in practice in Germany.

The Prime Minister of Spain (President of the Government) must resign if he proposes a vote of confidence to the Congress of Deputies (the lower chamber of the Cortes Generales, Spanish parliament) and is defeated, or alternatively, if the Congress censures the government on its own initiative. However, when a censure motion is introduced, the parties introducing it must nominate a prospective replacement candidate for Prime Minister at the same time. If the censure motion carries, the replacement candidate is deemed to have the confidence of the Congress and automatically ascends as Prime Minister.

Article 113

1. The Congress of Deputies may require political responsibility from the Government by adopting a motion of censure (no confidence) by overall (absolute) majority of its Members.
2. The motion of censure (no confidence) must be proposed by at least one tenth of the Members of Congress of Deputies and shall include a candidate for the office of the Presidency of the Government.
3. The motion of censure (no confidence) may not be voted until five days after it has been submitted. During the first two days of this period, alternative motions may be submitted.
4. If the motion of censure (no confidence) is not adopted by the Congress of Deputies, its signatories may not submit another during the same period of sessions.

Article 114

1. If the Congress of Deputies withholds its confidence from the Government, the latter shall submit its resignation to the King, whereafter the President of the Government shall be nominated in accordance with the provisions of Article 99.
2. If the Congress of Deputies adopts a motion of censure (no confidence), the Government shall present its resignation to the King and the candidate included in it shall be understood to have the confidence of the Chamber for the purposes provided in section 99. The King shall appoint him President of the Government.

There have been five attempted constructive votes of no confidence. The first successful vote came on 1 June 2018, when Mariano Rajoy (People's Party) was voted out in favour of Pedro Sánchez (Spanish Socialist Workers' Party).

== Hungary ==
Hungary first introduced constructive vote of no confidence under Article 39A of the October 1989 amendment of the 1949 Constitution, where the National Assembly of Hungary could not remove the Prime Minister of Hungary unless a prospective successor was nominated (and elected) at the same time:

Article 39A (1):

A motion of no confidence in the Prime Minister may be initiated by a written petition, which includes the nomination for a candidate for the office of Prime Minister, by no less than one-fifth of the Members of the National Assembly. A motion of no-confidence in the Prime Minister is considered a motion of no-confidence in the Government as well. Should, on the basis of this motion, the majority of the Members of the National Assembly withdraw their confidence, then the candidate nominated for Prime Minister in the motion shall be considered to have been elected.

=== Use ===
In March 2009 the prime minister Ferenc Gyurcsány (Hungarian Socialist Party, MSZP) announced he would hand over his position to a politician with a higher support of the parliament parties. The opposition Alliance of Free Democrats (SZDSZ) refused most candidates for the post proposed by the MSZP, but on 30 March 2009, Gordon Bajnai managed to get the backing of both parties. A constructive motion of no confidence against Ferenc Gyurcsány took place on 14 April and Bajnai became Prime Minister.

=== Fundamental Law of Hungary ===
The new Constitution of Hungary, the Fundamental Law in force from 2012, has almost identical provisions that allow only constructive vote of no confidence by the absolute majority of the National Assembly of Hungary.

Article 21

(1) One-fifth of the Members of the National Assembly may, together with the designation of a candidate for the office of Prime Minister, submit a written motion of no-confidence against the Prime Minister.

(2) If the National Assembly supports the motion of no-confidence, it thereby expresses its lack of confidence in the Prime Minister and simultaneously elects the person proposed for the office of Prime Minister in the motion of no-confidence. For such decision of the National Assembly, the votes of more than half of the Members of the National Assembly shall be required.

(3) The Prime Minister may put forward a confidence vote. The National Assembly expresses its lack of confidence in the Prime Minister if more than half of the Members of the National Assembly do not support the Prime Minister in the confidence vote proposed by the Prime Minister.

(4) The Prime Minister may propose that the vote on a proposal submitted by the Government be simultaneously a confidence vote. The National Assembly expresses its lack of confidence in the Prime Minister if it does not support the proposal submitted by the Government.

(5) The National Assembly shall decide on the question of confidence after the third day, but no later than eight days following the submission of the motion of no-confidence or of the Prime Minister’s motion pursuant to Paragraphs (3) or (4).

== Lesotho ==
Subsection (8) of section 87 of the Constitution of Lesotho stipulates that a motion of no confidence in the Prime Minister of Lesotho is of no effect unless the National Assembly nominates one of its members to be appointed prime minister in place of the incumbent:

A resolution of no confidence in the Government of Lesotho shall not be effective for the purposes of subsections (5)(a) and (7)(e) unless it proposes the name of a member of the National Assembly for the King to appoint in the place of the Prime Minister.

== Israel ==
The constructive vote of no confidence has been in place since the direct election of the Prime Minister of Israel was abolished in 2001. By a vote of no confidence the Knesset (parliament) did not elect new prime minister but only proposed a formateur: a presumptive nominee charged with seeking to form a new government. The candidate proposed then might or might not secure a positive vote of confidence before becoming prime minister. The system, therefore, did not guarantee continuity in the same way as the constructive vote of no confidence was used in Germany and elsewhere. Amendment No. I of the Basic Law of Government 2001 removed the formateur, switching to a conventional constructive vote of no confidence. The Basic Law of Government 2001 provides in Section 28 (b):

An expression of no confidence in the Government shall be done by means of a resolution of the Knesset, adopted by the majority of its Members to express confidence in another Government that announced basic guidelines of its policy, its make-up and the distribution of functions among Ministers, as stated in article 13 (d). The new Government shall be established once the Knesset has expressed confidence in it, and from that time the Ministers shall go into office.

== Poland ==
The Constitution of Poland (1997) states that the Sejm (lower chamber of the National Assembly of Poland) may remove the Council of Ministers of Poland (cabinet) only by a resolution (adopted by absolute majority) which specifies the name of a replacement Prime Minister. If the motion carries, the person named in the motion is automatically deemed to have the confidence of the Sejm, and the President of Poland is required to appoint him as Prime Minister.

Article 158

The Sejm shall pass a vote of no confidence in the Council of Ministers by a majority of votes of the statutory number of Deputies, on a motion moved by at least 46 Deputies and that shall specify the name of a candidate for Prime Minister. If such a resolution has been passed by the Sejm, the President of the Republic shall accept the resignation of the Council of Ministers and appoint a new Prime Minister as chosen by the Sejm, and, on his application, the other members of the Council of Ministers and accept their oath of office.

A motion to pass a resolution referred to in para. 1 above, may be put to a vote no sooner than 7 days after it has been submitted. A subsequent motion of a like kind may be submitted no sooner than after the end of 3 months from the day the previous motion was submitted.

== Albania ==
The Constitution of Albania (1998 as amended in 2008 and 2012) stipulates also that only constructive vote of no confidence may be adopted by the absolute majority of the unicameral Assembly (parliament) deputies.

Article 104 [Motion of confidence]

1. The Prime Minister has the right to submit to the Assembly a motion of confidence in the Council of Ministers. If the motion of confidence is voted by fewer than half of all the members of the Assembly, within 48 hours from the voting on the motion, the Prime Minister asks the President of the Republic to dissolve the Assembly.

2. The President dissolves the Assembly within 10 days from receipt of the request. A request for a motion of confidence may not be submitted during the period when a motion of no confidence according to article 105 is being examined.

3. The motion may not be voted on unless three days have passed from its submission.

Article 105 [Motion of no confidence]

1. One fifth of the deputies have the right to submit for voting in the Assembly a motion of no confidence in the Prime Minister in office, proposing a new Prime Minister.

2. The Assembly may vote a motion of no confidence against the Prime Minister only by electing a new Prime Minister with the votes of more than half of all its members.

3. The President of the Republic decrees the discharge of the Prime Minister in office and the appointment of the elected Prime Minister no later than 10 days from the voting on the motion in the Assembly.

== Slovenia ==
According to the Constitution of Slovenia (1991 as amended in 1997, 2000, 2003, 2004, 2006 and 2013) the National Assembly (Državni zbor, lower chamber of the parliament) may pass a motion of no confidence in the Government only by electing a new prime minister.

Article 116 [Vote of no confidence]

The National Assembly may pass a vote of no confidence in the Government only by electing a new President of the Government on the proposal of at least ten deputies and by a majority vote of all deputies. The incumbent President of the Government is thereby dismissed, but together with his ministers he must continue to perform his regular duties until the swearing in of a new Government.

No less than forty-eight hours must elapse between the lodging of a proposal to elect a new President of the Government and the vote itself, unless the National Assembly decides otherwise by a two-thirds majority vote of all deputies, or if the country is at war or in a state of emergency.

Where the President of the Government has been elected on the basis of the fourth paragraph of Article 111, a vote of no confidence is expressed in him if on the proposal of at least ten deputies, the National Assembly elects a new President of the Government by a majority of votes cast.

Article 117 [Vote of confidence]

The President of the Government may require a vote of confidence in the Government. If the Government does not receive the support of a majority vote of all deputies, within thirty days the National Assembly must elect a new President of the Government or in a new vote express its confidence in the incumbent President of the Government, or failing this, the President of the Republic dissolves the National Assembly and calls new elections. The President of the Government may tie the issue of confidence to the adoption of a law or to some other decision in the National Assembly. If such decision is not adopted, it is deemed that a vote of no confidence in the Government has been passed.

No less than forty-eight hours must elapse between the requirement of a vote of confidence and the vote itself.

== Belgium ==
The Kingdom of Belgium adopted constructive vote of no confidence in the Constitution of Belgium (1994 coordinated text) article considering the dissolution of parliament.

Article 46 [Reasons for Dissolution]

(1) The King has only the right to dissolve the Chamber of Representatives if the latter, with the absolute majority of its members:

1) either rejects a motion of confidence in the federal Government and does not propose to the King, within three days from the day of the rejection of the motion, the nomination of a successor to the Prime Minister;

2) or adopts a motion of disapproval (no confidence) with regard to the federal Government and does not simultaneously propose to the King the nomination of a successor to the Prime Minister.

(2) The motions of confidence and disapproval can only be voted on after a delay of forty-eight hours after the introduction of the motion.

(3) Moreover, the King may, in the event of the resignation of the federal Government, dissolve the Chamber of Representatives after having received its agreement expressed by the absolute majority of its members.

(4) The dissolution of the Chamber of Representatives entails the dissolution of the Senate.

(5) The act of dissolution involves the convoking of the electorate within forty days and of the Chambers within two months.

== Westminster systems ==
In partisan Westminster systems, a constructive vote of no confidence is normally not required. A prime minister faced with a vote of no confidence must either resign immediately or request a dissolution of parliament and fresh elections. This system is normally stable because strong political parties in the Westminster system ensure a very small number of viable candidates to replace a prime minister, and also ensures frequent and stable majority government.

However, this was not always the case historically, especially in Westminster systems without clearly defined political parties. In such circumstances, it was often the case that the sitting prime minister would be unpopular with parliamentarians but also might not have a viable successor who could have a better command of the parliament. In such cases, it was informally expected that parliament refrain from a vote of no confidence unless there was a reasonably obvious successor, in which case the prime minister would usually be expected to resign without recourse to fresh elections.

On the other hand, if a prime minister in a nonpartisan Westminster system sustained a vote of no confidence in spite of the lack of an obviously viable successor then depending on the circumstances he might have up to two alternatives to resignation: call fresh elections or attempt to continue governing in spite of the non-confidence vote.

== See also ==
- Parliamentary system
- Parliamentary sovereignty
- Motion of no confidence
