= Opinion polling for the April 2019 Spanish general election =

Surveys held before the April 2019 Spanish general election

In the run up to the April 2019 Spanish general election, various organisations carried out opinion polling to gauge voting intention in Spain during the term of the 12th Cortes Generales. Results of such polls are displayed in this article. The date range for these opinion polls is from the previous general election, held on 26 June 2016, to the day the next election was held, on 28 April 2019.

Voting intention estimates refer mainly to a hypothetical Congress of Deputies election. Polls are listed in reverse chronological order, showing the most recent first and using the dates when the survey fieldwork was done, as opposed to the date of publication. Where the fieldwork dates are unknown, the date of publication is given instead. The highest percentage figure in each polling survey is displayed with its background shaded in the leading party's colour. If a tie ensues, this is applied to the figures with the highest percentages. The "Lead" column on the right shows the percentage-point difference between the parties with the highest percentages in a poll.

== Electoral polling ==
=== Nationwide polling ===
==== Graphical summary ====
Local regression trend line of poll results from 26 June 2016 to 28 April 2019, with each line corresponding to a political party.

==== Voting intention estimates ====
The table below lists nationwide voting intention estimates. Refusals are generally excluded from the party vote percentages, while question wording and the treatment of "don't know" responses and those not intending to vote may vary between polling organisations. When available, seat projections determined by the polling organisations are displayed below (or in place of) the percentages in a smaller font; 176 seats are required for an absolute majority in the Congress of Deputies.

===== 2019 (Mar–Apr) =====
Color key:

Poll conducted after legal ban on opinion polls

Polling firm/Commissioner	Fieldwork date	Sample size	Turnout	PP	PSOE	Unidas Podemos	Cs	ERC–Sobiranistes	JxCat	PNV	PACMA	EH Bildu	CCa	Vox	Compromís	NA+	Lead
April 2019 general election	28 Apr	—N/a	71.8	16.7; 66	28.7; 123	14.3; 42	15.9; 57	3.9; 15	1.9; 7	1.5; 6	1.3; 0	1.0; 4	0.5; 2	10.3; 24	0.7; 1	0.4; 2	12.0
ElectoPanel/Electomanía	28 Apr	4,300	?	19.3; 70	25.3; 105	14.5; 46	15.0; 51	3.3; 13	1.4; 4	1.3; 6	1.4; 0	0.8; 3	0.3; 1	13.0; 42	1.2; 3	0.3; 2	6.0
SocioMétrica/El Español	25–27 Apr	3,600	?	17.9; 74/79	27.9; 114/120	16.5; 44/50	16.0; 49/55	2.8; 10/11	1.6; 4/5	1.2; 5/6	–	0.9; 2/5	0.3; 0/1	11.0; 29/33	0.5; 0/1	0.3; 1/2	10.0
IMOP/COPE	25–27 Apr	4,200	?	18.3; 67/77	26.8; 105/120	16.8; 45/60	14.2; 40/50	3.1; 13/15	1.3; 3/5	1.2; 5/6	–	0.9; 2/3	0.3; 0/1	12.7; 35/50	0.6; 1/2	0.2; 1/2	8.5
GAD3/RTVE–FORTA	12–27 Apr	12,000	?	17.8; 69/73	28.1; 116/121	16.1; 42/45	14.4; 48/49	3.3; 13/14	1.6; 5	1.3; 6	–	0.7; 2	0.3; 1	12.4; 36/38	0.5; 1	0.5; 2	10.3
El Español	26 Apr	?	?	18.0– 19.0; 73/77	27.0– 28.0; 105/119	15.0– 17.0; 46/50	15.0– 16.5; 49/57	–	–	–	–	–	–	11.0– 12.0; 31/47	–	–	9.0
Podemos	26 Apr	?	?	15.0	30.0	15.0	15.0	–	–	–	–	–	–	15.0	–	–	15.0
Demoscopia Servicios/Okdiario	26 Apr	?	?	21.7; 84	27.2; 117	12.3; 28	15.4; 51	–	–	–	–	–	–	13.3; 41	–	–	5.5
PSOE	25 Apr	?	?	15.0– 17.0	30.0– 31.0	?	?	–	–	–	–	–	–	13.0– 16.0	–	–	13.0– 15.0
ElectoPanel/Electomanía	22 Feb–25 Apr	11,000	?	20.2; 76	25.3; 105	14.6; 47	15.0; 53	2.7; 13	1.3; 4	1.3; 6	1.8; 0	0.8; 3	0.3; 1	12.3; 35	1.3; 3	0.3; 2	5.1
ElectoPanel/Electomanía	22 Feb–24 Apr	11,000	?	20.1; 77	25.6; 107	14.1; 44	15.1; 53	2.7; 13	1.3; 4	1.3; 6	1.9; 0	0.8; 3	0.2; 0	12.4; 36	1.3; 3	0.3; 2	5.5
ElectoPanel/Electomanía	22 Feb–23 Apr	11,000	?	19.9; 74	26.2; 111	13.5; 40	15.1; 53	2.7; 13	1.3; 4	1.3; 6	2.1; 1	0.8; 3	0.2; 0	12.4; 37	1.3; 3	0.3; 2	6.3
Hamalgama Métrica/Espiral21	22 Apr	?	70.5	23.1; 90/100	28.1; 115/120	12.1; 30/40	13.2; 32/42	3.1; 13/14	1.4; 5/6	1.3; 5/6	1.4; 0	0.8; 2/3	0.3; 0/1	10.1; 25/37	0.9; 3/4	0.1; 2	5.0
Llorente & Cuenca	22 Apr	?	?	22.0; 86	28.3; 124	13.8; 38	18.9; 65	2.8; 12	1.3; 6	? 4	–	? 2	? 1	7.9; 12	–	(Note: Within PP.)	6.3
KeyData/Público	22 Apr	?	67.7	20.4; 83	29.4; 128	13.1; 34	15.3; 53	3.3; 14	1.5; 5	1.2; 6	–	0.9; 2	0.4; 1	10.4; 22	(Note: Within Unidas Podemos (as Compromís–Podemos–EUPV: A la valenciana).)	? 2	9.0
Demoscopia Servicios/Okdiario	17–22 Apr	950	68.7	21.8; 89	28.1; 120	12.6; 29	14.4; 46	2.9; 13	1.3; 5	1.4; 6	–	0.9; 3	0.3; 1	12.7; 36	1.1; 2		6.3
ElectoPanel/Electomanía	22 Feb–22 Apr	11,000	?	19.5; 71	27.2; 118	12.8; 38	15.0; 52	2.7; 12	1.3; 4	1.3; 6	2.2; 1	0.8; 3	0.2; 0	12.4; 36	1.3; 3	0.3; 2	7.7
Infortécnica	21 Apr	1,600	?	? 93/103	? 100/110	? 33/38	? 39/43	–	–	–	–	–	–	? 27/42	–	–	?
SocioMétrica/El Español	14–21 Apr	1,800	?	18.2; 72/77	29.5; 126/134	13.6; 35/43	15.1; 43/49	3.3; 11/12	1.3; 4	1.1; 4/5	0.9; 0	0.9; 2	0.2; 0/1	12.6; 31/37	1.1; 1/2	0.3; 2	11.3
ElectoPanel/Electomanía	22 Feb–21 Apr	11,000	?	19.9; 74	27.4; 120	12.4; 35	14.4; 48	2.8; 13	1.3; 4	1.3; 6	2.3; 1	0.8; 3	0.2; 0	12.5; 38	1.3; 3	0.3; 2	7.5
Celeste-Tel/eldiario.es	15–20 Apr	1,100	68.3	23.5; 93/99	28.9; 119/123	13.5; 38/40	15.1; 49/52	2.9; 13/14	1.5; 4/5	1.2; 6	1.3; 0	0.8; 2/3	0.3; 1	7.9; 14/18	1.3; 3	0.4; 2	5.4
IMOP/El Confidencial	14–20 Apr	1,400	70.0	19.8; 68/78	29.8; 123/137	14.1; 35/42	15.1; 48/52	3.0; 13/14	1.2; 4/5	1.2; 6	1.8; 0	0.8; 2/3	0.3; 0/1	10.0; 23/28	0.8; 2/3	0.3; 2	10.0
SocioMétrica/El Español	13–20 Apr	1,800	?	18.4; 75	30.0; 129	13.7; 38	15.5; 52	3.2; 11	1.4; 4	1.1; 5	0.8; 0	1.0; 2	0.2; 0	11.8; 32	1.0; 2	0.3; 2	11.6
ElectoPanel/Electomanía	22 Feb–20 Apr	10,800	?	19.9; 74	27.5; 121	12.3; 34	14.3; 48	2.7; 12	1.3; 4	1.3; 6	2.2; 1	0.8; 3	0.2; 0	12.5; 38	1.3; 3	0.3; 2	7.6
InvyMark/laSexta	15–19 Apr	?	?	20.4	28.1	13.0	15.2	3.3	1.3	1.3	–	–	–	12.7	–	–	7.7
NC Report/La Razón	15–19 Apr	1,000	68.9	23.8; 100/101	28.1; 116/118	13.0; 34/38	14.9; 50	2.9; 13/14	1.4; 5	1.3; 6	–	0.8; 2/3	0.3; 1	9.0; 13/14	1.5; 3	0.4; 2	4.3
SocioMétrica/El Español	12–19 Apr	1,800	?	18.5; 74	30.5; 131	13.8; 37	15.9; 54	3.1; 12	1.5; 5	1.0; 5	0.7; 0	1.1; 2	0.2; 0	10.9; 27	0.8; 1	0.2; 2	12.0
GAD3/ABC	1–19 Apr	10,000	?	20.1; 81/86	31.5; 134/139	12.1; 27	13.9; 42/44	3.3; 13	1.2; 4	1.2; 6	1.9; 0	0.9; 2	0.3; 1	11.4; 30/32	0.4; 1	0.5; 2	11.4
ElectoPanel/Electomanía	22 Feb–19 Apr	10,700	?	20.1; 76	27.6; 122	12.4; 34	14.2; 47	2.8; 13	1.3; 4	1.3; 6	2.3; 1	0.8; 4	0.2; 0	12.5; 38	1.3; 2	0.4; 2	7.5
Demoscopia Servicios/ESdiario	15–18 Apr	950	?	21.6; 87	28.4; 122	12.7; 30	14.7; 48	2.4; 11	1.2; 5	1.4; 6	–	0.9; 3	0.3; 1	12.4; 34	1.2; 3		6.8
40dB/El País	15–18 Apr	2,000	?	17.8; 75	28.8; 129	13.2; 33	14.1; 49	3.3; 13	1.9; 5	1.0; 5	2.8; 2	1.0; 3	0.4; 1	12.5; 32	0.9; 3	–	11.0
Sondaxe/La Voz de Galicia	11–18 Apr	1,000	?	18.3; 71	30.9; 137	13.6; 33	13.8; 50	2.8; 11	1.5; 6	2.1; 9	–	0.8; 2	0.4; 1	10.5; 28	–	0.3; 2	12.6
SocioMétrica/El Español	11–18 Apr	1,800	?	18.6; 72	31.0; 134	13.4; 38	15.5; 52	3.2; 11	1.4; 5	1.1; 5	0.9; 0	1.0; 4	0.2; 0	11.0; 27	0.6; 1	0.2; 2	12.4
ElectoPanel/Electomanía	22 Feb–18 Apr	10,600	?	20.3; 77	27.6; 121	12.4; 35	14.3; 47	2.8; 13	1.3; 4	1.4; 6	2.3; 1	0.9; 4	0.2; 0	12.4; 37	1.3; 2	0.4; 2	7.3
PP	17 Apr	?	?	19.0	30.0	12.5	12.5	–	–	–	–	–	–	11.0	–	–	11.0
DYM/El Independiente	15–17 Apr	1,025	?	20.4; 80/86	29.0; 122/127	13.7; 34/40	15.5; 46/52	–	–	–	–	–	–	10.4; 26/32	–	–	8.6
Celeste-Tel/eldiario.es	11–17 Apr	1,100	?	23.8; 95/98	28.1; 115/118	12.9; 38/39	15.8; 52/53	2.9; 13/14	1.4; 4/5	1.2; 6	1.4; 0	0.8; 2	0.3; 1	7.7; 13/18	1.4; 3	0.4; 2	4.3
SocioMétrica/El Español	10–17 Apr	1,800	?	18.7; 75	30.8; 133	13.1; 38	15.8; 53	3.4; 12	1.3; 4	1.1; 5	0.8; 0	1.1; 3	0.2; 0	10.6; 27	0.7; 2	0.3; 2	12.1
Sigma Dos/El Mundo	3–17 Apr	8,000	?	20.1; 74/86	30.3; 122/133	13.2; 30/41	15.0; 48/56	3.8; 15	1.3; 4	1.3; 6	–	–	–	10.2; 20/32	–	–	10.2
ElectoPanel/Electomanía	22 Feb–17 Apr	10,200	?	20.4; 79	27.7; 120	12.4; 34	14.6; 50	2.7; 13	1.3; 4	1.4; 6	2.2; 1	0.8; 4	0.2; 0	12.0; 35	1.3; 1	0.4; 2	7.3
Metroscopia/Henneo	11–16 Apr	4,775	?	19.6; 76/88	29.1; 115/128	14.3; 32/37	14.2; 44/53	3.5; 15	1.4; 5	1.4; 6/7	–	0.7; 2/3	0.3; 1	11.1; 20/36	1.1; 3/4	0.3; 2	9.5
IMOP/El Confidencial	10–16 Apr	1,400	71.0	19.3; 72	30.4; 131	13.5; 34	15.3; 52	3.2; 14	1.4; 5	1.2; 6	1.9; 0	0.8; 3	0.3; 1	9.6; 27	0.8; 2	0.3; 2	11.1
SocioMétrica/El Español	9–16 Apr	1,800	?	18.8; 73	30.5; 132	12.7; 35	16.0; 52	3.3; 14	1.3; 4	1.1; 6	1.0; 0	1.0; 4	0.2; 0	10.9; 27	0.8; 2	0.3; 1	11.7
ElectoPanel/Electomanía	22 Feb–16 Apr	10,200	?	20.2; 77	28.2; 124	12.4; 33	15.3; 53	2.8; 13	1.3; 4	1.3; 6	2.1; 1	0.8; 4	0.2; 0	11.5; 31	1.3; 1	0.4; 2	8.0
Top Position	13–15 Apr	1,200	?	22.3; 90/98	27.8; 110/118	12.2; 26/30	13.1; 29/35	3.2; 12/14	1.6; 4/6	1.2 ?	–	–	–	14.2; 48/54	–	–	5.5
Demoscopia Servicios/Okdiario	12–15 Apr	?	?	21.3; 86	28.9; 124	12.8; 29	14.9; 49	2.3; 10	1.3; 7	1.5; 6	–	1.2; 3	? 1	12.2; 33	? 2		7.6
GAD3/ABC	9–15 Apr	2,000	?	20.9; 82/86	31.3; 136/139	12.3; 28/32	13.2; 39/41	–	–	–	–	–	–	11.8; 30/34	–	–	10.4
SocioMétrica/El Español	8–15 Apr	1,800	?	19.0; 74	30.2; 131	13.2; 37	15.7; 52	3.2; 12	1.2; 3	1.2; 6	1.1; 0	0.9; 3	0.2; 0	11.0; 28	0.9; 2	0.3; 1	11.2
ElectoPanel/Electomanía	22 Feb–15 Apr	10,100	?	20.2; 77	28.2; 123	12.3; 34	15.1; 53	2.8; 13	1.3; 4	1.3; 6	2.1; 1	0.9; 4	0.2; 0	11.5; 31	1.3; 1	0.4; 2	8.0
KeyData/Público	14 Apr	?	65.2	20.8; 82	28.8; 126	13.5; 36	15.6; 54	3.4; 15	1.6; 5	1.3; 6	–	0.9; 3	0.3; 1	9.8; 20		? 2	8.0
ElectoPanel/Electomanía	22 Feb–14 Apr	10,000	?	20.0; 78	28.1; 124	12.1; 34	15.3; 53	2.8; 13	1.3; 5	1.3; 6	1.9; 0	0.8; 4	0.2; 1	11.1; 28	1.3; 1	0.4; 2	8.1
NC Report/La Razón	9–13 Apr	1,000	66.5	24.1; 99/101	27.5; 111/113	12.1; 31/33	15.8; 53/55	2.9; 12/13	1.3; 4	1.3; 6	–	0.8; 2	0.3; 1	9.1; 18/20	1.8; 4/5	0.4; 2	3.4
IMOP/El Confidencial	7–13 Apr	1,410	70.0	18.6; 68	31.0; 135	13.4; 34	15.8; 53	3.3; 14	1.3; 4	1.2; 6	2.0; 1	0.8; 3	0.3; 1	9.5; 25	0.9; 3	0.3; 2	12.4
SocioMétrica/El Español	5–12 Apr	1,800	?	19.1; 73/77	29.9; 124/130	13.0; 29/33	15.4; 49/56	3.2; 11/13	1.4; 5/6	1.3; 5/6	1.2; 0	1.0; 3	0.3; 0/1	11.2; 31/36	0.8; 2/3	0.4; 2	10.8
GAD3/La Vanguardia	9–11 Apr	1,800	71.0	21.0; 81/86	31.1; 137/139	11.4; 27/30	14.4; 44/46	3.6; 13/15	1.2; 3/4	1.2; 6	1.4; 0	0.7; 2	0.3; 1	11.2; 26/29	0.5; 1		10.1
Demoscopia Servicios/ESdiario	8–11 Apr	920	?	20.8; 83	27.9; 117	13.2; 31	16.6; 59	2.3; 14	1.2; 6	1.5; 6	–	1.1; 2	0.2; 1	11.7; 27	1.0; 4		7.1
InvyMark/laSexta	8–11 Apr	?	?	20.8	27.1	13.2	16.4	–	–	–	–	–	–	12.7	–	–	6.3
Celeste-Tel/eldiario.es	4–10 Apr	1,100	?	23.9; 99/102	27.3; 112/117	13.1; 32/37	15.9; 51/56	2.8; 11/13	1.6; 5	1.2; 6	1.5; 0	0.8; 2/3	0.3; 1	7.8; 12/14	1.5; 4/5	0.5; 1	3.4
GAD3/ABC	8–9 Apr	2,000	?	21.3; 85/91	30.9; 135/137	12.0; 29/30	13.5; 43/46	? 12/13	? 4/5	? 6	–	? 2	? 1	11.2; 25/29	? 1	? 2	9.6
IMOP/El Confidencial	3–9 Apr	1,407	70.7	19.4; 70	31.0; 135	13.2; 33	16.0; 56	3.1; 14	1.3; 4	1.3; 6	1.5; 0	0.8; 3	? 1	9.8; 23	0.8; 3	? 2	11.6
ElectoPanel/Electomanía	22 Feb–7 Apr	9,600	?	20.1; 80	27.4; 116	11.9; 34	15.6; 59	2.6; 12	1.3; 4	1.3; 6	1.2; 0	0.9; 4	0.3; 1	10.6; 27	1.5; 2	0.4; 2	7.3
NC Report/La Razón	2–6 Apr	1,000	66.3	24.0; 99/101	26.9; 108/112	12.3; 29/31	16.1; 55/56	2.8; 11/12	1.3; 4/5	1.3; 6	–	0.8; 2/3	0.3; 1	9.4; 19/22	1.7; 5	0.4; 2	2.9
IMOP/El Confidencial	31 Mar–6 Apr	1,440	72.0	20.0; 76	31.5; 136	12.9; 32	15.5; 53	3.2; 14	1.2; 4	1.3; 6	1.2; 0	0.9; 3	? 1	9.3; 20	0.6; 3	? 2	11.5
Simple Lógica	1–5 Apr	1,054	73.7	16.7	30.5	14.4	15.5	–	–	–	–	–	–	9.8	–	–	13.8
GESOP/El Periódico	1–5 Apr	1,500	?	21.0; 84/87	29.8; 128/132	12.0; 30/32	14.5; 48/50	? 14/15	? 4/5	–	–	–	–	10.6; 21/23	–	–	8.8
SocioMétrica/El Español	29 Mar–5 Apr	1,800	?	19.4; 75	30.1; 129	12.3; 30	15.1; 54	3.0; 12	1.3; 5	1.2; 5	1.2; 0	0.8; 2	0.3; 1	10.6; 29	1.0; 3	0.5; 3	10.7
GAD3/ABC	26 Mar–4 Apr	4,000	?	20.9; 86/90	31.1; 137/139	11.5; 28/30	14.9; 47/50	? 12/13	? 4/5	? 6	–	? 2	? 1	9.8; 16/18	? 1	? 2	10.2
Celeste-Tel/eldiario.es	26 Mar–3 Apr	1,100	?	23.6; 97/100	27.2; 113/118	12.2; 31/33	15.7; 52/55	2.8; 11/13	1.6; 5	1.2; 6	1.5; 0	0.7; 2/3	0.3; 1	8.7; 14/16	1.6; 4/5	0.5; 1	3.6
KeyData/Público	2 Apr	?	68.9	20.6; 83	28.7; 120	13.7; 41	16.0; 56	2.9; 13	1.4; 5	1.2; 6	–	0.8; 3	0.2; 1	10.8; 22			8.1
IMOP/El Confidencial	27 Mar–2 Apr	1,431	69.0	20.8; 83	30.0; 127	13.9; 35	14.8; 52	3.5; 15	1.1; 4	1.1; 6	1.5; 0	1.0; 3	? 1	9.6; 20	0.5; 2	? 2	9.2
ElectoPanel/Electomanía	22 Feb–31 Mar	8,850	?	19.9; 80	27.7; 116	11.4; 34	16.6; 61	2.4; 10	1.3; 5	1.3; 6	1.1; 0	0.9; 4	0.2; 1	10.7; 27	1.8; 3	–	7.8
IMOP/El Confidencial	24–30 Mar	1,419	67.0	21.6; 89	30.0; 130	13.7; 35	14.0; 47	3.5; 15	1.1; 4	1.1; 6	1.8; 0	1.0; 3	? 1	9.5; 18	0.5; 2	–	8.4
NC Report/La Razón	25–29 Mar	1,000	66.2	23.1; 93/96	26.7; 109/113	11.9; 26/28	16.5; 56/59	3.0; 12	1.3; 4/5	1.3; 4/5	–	0.7; 2/3	? 1	10.3; 23/25	? 5	? 1	3.6
SocioMétrica/El Español	25–29 Mar	1,600	?	18.8; 69/74	29.0; 124/131	12.6; 28/34	16.1; 48/54	3.0; 11/12	1.3; 5/6	1.2; 5/6	1.2; 0/1	0.9; 2/3	0.3; 0/1	11.9; 31/37	0.5; 2/3	0.3; 2/3	10.2
InvyMark/laSexta	25–29 Mar	?	?	20.1	25.9	13.0	17.5	–	–	–	–	–	–	12.9	–	–	5.8
Demoscopia Servicios/Okdiario	24–27 Mar	1,175	?	21.0; 88	27.7; 118	13.4; 30	16.9; 59	2.1; 11	1.4; 8	1.5; 6	–	1.0; 2	–	11.2; 23	1.4; 4		6.7
Celeste-Tel/eldiario.es	21–27 Mar	1,100	?	22.9; 93/95	27.0; 110/115	12.1; 31/33	16.7; 56/59	2.8; 11/13	1.7; 5	1.2; 6	1.4; 0	0.7; 2/3	0.3; 1	9.1; 18/20	1.6; 4/5	0.5; 1	4.1
IMOP/El Confidencial	20–26 Mar	1,400	65.0	20.0; 77	31.0; 133	11.9; 28	14.9; 53	3.3; 14	1.3; 4	1.2; 6	2.0; 1	1.1; 3	? 1	10.1; 27	0.7; 3	–	11.0
Metroscopia/Henneo	18–25 Mar	2,722	67	19.0; 72/78	28.7; 116/126	14.0; 35/41	16.3; 53/62	? 14	? 6	? 6	–	? 2/4	? 1	11.7; 30/37		–	9.7
ElectoPanel/Electomanía	22 Feb–24 Mar	8,200	?	20.1; 82	28.6; 118	11.1; 32	16.3; 60	2.4; 9	1.3; 5	1.3; 6	1.1; 0	0.9; 4	0.2; 1	10.5; 25	1.8; 3	–	8.5
IMOP/El Confidencial	17–23 Mar	1,399	65.5	19.5; 75	30.5; 131	12.4; 31	14.4; 52	3.5; 14	1.3; 5	1.3; 6	2.1; 1	1.0; 3	? 1	11.0; 29	? 2	–	11.0
NC Report/La Razón	18–22 Mar	1,000	?	22.4; 91/93	26.9; 106/111	12.0; 27/29	17.1; 57/61	2.9; 11/12	1.2; 4/5	1.3; 6	–	0.7; 2/3	? 1	10.7; 24/26	1.5; 6	–	4.5
GAD3/ABC	1–22 Mar	7,500	?	21.9; 94/99	30.9; 131/134	11.3; 27	13.1; 37/38	2.6; 12	1.5; 6	1.2; 6	–	0.7; 2	0.3; 1	11.5; 24/27	0.5; 1	? 2	9.0
Sondaxe/La Voz de Galicia	15–20 Mar	1,000	?	18.9; 78	26.9; 113	13.4; 35	13.8; 44	3.9; 15	1.7; 6	1.0; 5	–	0.8; 3	0.5; 1	13.9; 50		–	8.0
40dB/El País	14–19 Mar	1,500	?	19.3; 76	27.1; 122	12.3; 40	17.7; 55	–	–	–	–	–	–	10.2; 31		–	7.8
CIS (SocioMétrica) (Note: Alternative projection based on raw CIS data.)	1–18 Mar	16,194	?	20.1	30.6	13.3	14.7	3.9	1.3	1.4	1.8	0.9	0.4	9.0	0.6	0.3	10.5
CIS	1–18 Mar	16,194	74.8	17.2; 66/76	30.2; 123/138	12.9; 33/41	13.6; 42/51	4.5; 17/18	1.2; 4/5	1.3; 6	1.4; 0/2	1.1; 3/5	0.4; 0/1	11.9; 29/37	0.9; 1/2	0.1; 1/2	13.0

===== 2019 (Jan–Mar) =====
Polling firm/Commissioner	Fieldwork date	Sample size	Turnout	PP	PSOE	Unidas Podemos	Cs	ERC–Sobiranistes	PDeCAT	PNV	PACMA	EH Bildu	CCa	Vox	Compromís	Lead
ElectoPanel/Electomanía	22 Feb–17 Mar	7,400	?	20.7; 84	27.3; 115	11.3; 30	15.4; 55	3.2; 13	1.3; 4	1.3; 6	0.9; 0	0.8; 2	0.3; 1	12.5; 36	1.7; 3	6.6
NC Report/La Razón	11–15 Mar	1,000	65.7	23.2; 95/98	26.0; 104/107	14.8; 40/43	17.8; 61/64	2.8; 11	1.2; 5	1.1; 5	–	0.6; 2	–	10.3; 20/23		2.8
Simple Lógica	4–13 Mar	1,092	72.8	17.1	31.2	12.4	16.7	–	–	–	–	–	–	8.6		14.1
Celeste-Tel/eldiario.es	4–11 Mar	1,100	66.4	22.8; 95/97	25.4; 100/103	14.3; 42/45	18.1; 62/65	2.7; 10/11	1.7; 6	1.2; 6	1.2; 0	0.7; 2/3	0.3; 0	9.6; 21/22		2.6
ElectoPanel/Electomanía	22 Feb–10 Mar	6,800	?	20.3; 83	26.9; 115	11.4; 32	16.1; 55	3.3; 13	1.3; 4	1.3; 6	0.9; 0	0.8; 2	0.3; 1	12.3; 35	1.8; 3	6.6
KeyData/Público	9 Mar	?	69.9	21.5; 88	26.6; 112	14.5; 43	16.1; 57	2.9; 13	1.5; 5	1.2; 6	–	0.8; 3	0.3; 1	10.2; 22		5.1
SocioMétrica/El Español	5–8 Mar	1,600	74.0	17.5; 69/71	27.6; 119/121	14.1; 37/39	17.8; 63/65	3.1; 11/13	1.5; 5/6	1.0; 4/5	2.0; 0/1	0.9; 2/3	0.2; 0/1	12.1; 31/34		9.8
GAD3/ABC	4–8 Mar	1,000	?	22.1; 87	30.6; 134	11.8; 30	13.2; 38	2.8; 12	1.5; 5	1.2; 6	–	0.6; 2	0.2; 0	12.1; 36		8.5
InvyMark/laSexta	4–8 Mar	?	?	20.4	25.2	13.2	20.3	–	–	–	–	–	–	11.5		4.8
ElectoPanel/Electomanía	22 Feb–3 Mar	5,200	?	20.5; 84	26.7; 115	11.5; 33	16.2; 55	3.3; 13	1.3; 4	1.3; 6	0.8; 0	0.8; 2	0.3; 1	12.1; 34	1.8; 3	6.2
KeyData/Público	26 Feb	?	67.9	21.5; 88	25.1; 107	14.5; 46	18.0; 61	3.1; 13	1.5; 5	1.3; 5	–	0.8; 3	0.3; 1	10.9; 21		3.6
Sigma Dos/El Mundo	19–22 Feb	1,200	?	19.1; 71/75	27.3; 110/114	14.4; 37/39	16.0; 54/58	3.2; 11/13	1.1; 3/5	1.2; 6	–	–	–	13.3; 44/46		8.2
GAD3/ABC	18–22 Feb	800	71	23.2; 97	28.9; 122	11.5; 29	15.7; 53	3.0; 13	1.5; 5	1.3; 6	–	0.6; 2	0.2; 0	10.8; 23		5.7
InvyMark/laSexta	18–21 Feb	?	?	21.0	24.3	13.9	20.2	–	–	–	–	–	–	11.3		3.3
Sondaxe/La Voz de Galicia	13–21 Feb	1,500	?	19.3; 76	28.2; 116	14.2; 39	13.5; 40	3.8; 14	1.7; 6	1.4; 6	–	0.8; 2	–	14.2; 51		8.9
SocioMétrica/El Español	13–15 Feb	1,000	71.0	18.6; 73	24.3; 106	11.9; 33	18.7; 65	3.3; 12	1.3; 4	1.1; 6	1.9; 0	0.8; 2	0.3; 1	11.8; 40	2.3; 6	5.6
SocioMétrica/El Español	13–15 Feb	1,000	71.0	18.6; 72/74	24.3; 105/107	15.2; 40/42	18.7; 64/66	3.3; 11/13	1.3; 4	1.1; 6	1.9; 0	0.8; 2	0.3; 1	11.8; 38/42		5.6
GESOP/El Periódico	13–15 Feb	1,000	?	19.9; 75/77	27.4; 115/117	13.6; 36/39	14.5; 44/47	? 16/17	? 2/3	–	–	–	–	13.0; 43/46		7.5
GAD3/La Vanguardia	12–15 Feb	1,200	71.0	23.6; 97	28.2; 119	12.4; 32	17.1; 60	2.8; 11	1.6; 6	1.2; 6	–	0.6; 2	0.3; 1	8.8; 16		4.6
NC Report/La Razón	11–15 Feb	1,000	65.6	23.6; 97/100	24.1; 96/99	16.0; 43/46	18.9; 65/66	2.8; 12	1.3; 5	1.1; 5	–	0.6; 2	–	10.0; 19/22		0.5
Metroscopia/Henneo	11–13 Feb	1,995	65	20.5	27.6	13.8	15.4	–	–	–	–	–	–	12.7		7.1
CIS (El País)	1–10 Feb	2,964	?	23.0	27.0	17.0	17.0	–	–	–	–	–	–	6.0		4.0
CIS (SocioMétrica)	1–10 Feb	2,964	67.7	20.3	27.9	17.3	17.5	2.9	1.0	1.0	2.2	0.8	0.2	6.8		7.6
Celeste-Tel/eldiario.es	4–8 Feb	1,100	66.4	23.1; 96/98	23.7; 94/97	15.8; 47/49	19.2; 63/67	2.8; 11/12	1.7; 6	1.2; 5/6	1.1; 0	0.8; 2/3	0.3; 1	8.9; 17/20		0.6
Simple Lógica	1–8 Feb	1,017	74.2	17.9	25.4	13.9	17.0	–	–	–	–	–	–	11.7		7.5
InvyMark/laSexta	28 Jan–1 Feb	?	?	21.3	23.9	13.5	20.9	–	–	–	–	–	–	11.2		2.6
ElectoPanel/Electomanía	26–30 Jan	2,890	?	20.1; 83	23.1; 91	14.9; 50	19.6; 71	? 12	? 4	? 6	–	? 2	–	12.1; 31		3.0
KeyData/Público	27 Jan	?	68.7	21.5; 89	22.3; 98	14.8; 51	19.8; 67	3.1; 12	1.6; 6	1.1; 6	–	0.9; 2	0.3; 1	10.3; 18		0.8
NC Report/La Razón	21–25 Jan	1,000	65.9	24.0; 98/100	24.2; 97/99	16.6; 45/48	18.7; 63/65	2.8; 11	1.2; 5	0.9; 5	–	0.7; 2	–	9.4; 17/20		0.2
GAD3/ABC	14–24 Jan	1,800	?	23.0; 97	26.5; 111	11.6; 31	17.1; 61	2.8; 13	1.6; 6	1.2; 6	–	0.6; 2	0.2; 0	9.8; 23		3.5
InvyMark/laSexta	14–18 Jan	?	?	21.5	23.2	14.4	23.0	–	–	–	–	–	–	8.9		0.2
Metroscopia/Henneo	9–15 Jan	2,332	67	19.1	23.7	17.1	17.8	–	–	–	–	–	–	12.1		4.6
ElectoPanel/Electomanía	6–13 Jan	1,399	?	19.1; 74	21.3; 87	16.3; 53	19.9; 73	? 12	? 5	? 6	1.1; 0	? 3	–	13.0; 37		1.4
CIS (El País)	1–13 Jan	2,989	?	21.0	24.0	18.6	18.6	–	–	–	–	–	–	7.5		3.0
CIS (SocioMétrica)	1–13 Jan	2,989	65.0	19.3	23.8	18.0	19.0	3.7	1.1	1.2	1.9	1.1	0.3	8.1		4.5
Hamalgama Métrica/La Provincia	15 Dec–13 Jan	?	?	22.5; 84/86	21.2; 74/78	19.3; 62/65	18.2; 66/70	2.5; 8	1.8; 4/5	2.0; 7	–	0.6; 2	0.2; 0/1	8.7; 28/29		1.3
Simple Lógica	3–9 Jan	1,042	71.0	18.2	25.1	14.0	17.9	–	–	–	–	–	–	11.5		6.9
Celeste-Tel/eldiario.es	2–8 Jan	1,100	66.8	23.8; 97/98	24.1; 95/97	16.1; 48/50	19.6; 65/68	2.8; 10/12	1.5; 5/6	1.0; 5	0.8; 0	0.7; 2/3	0.3; 1	8.1; 15/18		0.3
SocioMétrica/El Español	22 Dec–5 Jan	2,200	?	18.3; 74/76	22.4; 89/91	17.1; 58/60	18.5; 64/66	3.2; 13	1.4; 6	1.2; 6	–	0.9; 3	0.3; 1	12.5; 31/33		3.9
KeyData/Público	2 Jan	?	68.1	22.0; 90	22.6; 101	15.2; 51	20.5; 71	2.9; 11	1.7; 6	1.1; 6	–	0.8; 2	0.3; 1	8.6; 11		0.6

===== 2018 =====
Polling firm/Commissioner	Fieldwork date	Sample size	Turnout	PP	PSOE	Unidos Podemos	Cs	ERC–Sobiranistes	PDeCAT	PNV	PACMA	EH Bildu	CCa	Vox	Lead
Sigma Dos/El Mundo	21–27 Dec	1,000	?	19.2; 70/74	22.6; 92/96	15.8; 45/47	18.8; 66/70	3.6; 12/14	1.0; 2/4	1.2; 6	–	–	–	12.9; 43/45	3.4
InvyMark/laSexta	17–21 Dec	?	?	21.8	23.5	15.2	22.7	–	–	–	–	–	–	7.8	0.8
Llorente & Cuenca	17 Dec	?	?	23.9; 95/96	25.3; 104	13.9; 44/45	19.8; 67/69	3.5; 12	1.4; 5	? 5	–	? 3	–	7.3; 11/16	1.4
Sigma Dos/Antena 3	16 Dec	1,000	?	21.2; 87/91	24.1; 99/103	16.7; 50/54	18.4; 64/68	? 13/15	? 2/3	? 5/6	–	–	–	9.2; 15/17	2.9
KeyData/Público	16 Dec	?	68.4	22.3; 91	23.0; 102	15.6; 51	20.7; 72	3.0; 11	1.5; 6	1.1; 6	–	0.8; 2	0.3; 1	7.3; 8	0.7
SocioMétrica/El Español	10–14 Dec	900	71.0	21.6; 88	22.5; 92	17.8; 61	19.0; 65	3.1; 13	1.5; 6	1.2; 6	–	0.7; 2	0.4; 1	8.5; 16	0.9
GAD3/ABC	10–14 Dec	1,005	?	20.5; 89	24.2; 104	14.2; 38	20.7; 74	2.8; 12	1.8; 6	1.2; 6	–	0.7; 2	0.2; 0	8.7; 19	3.5
NC Report/La Razón	5–14 Dec	1,000	65.7	24.4; 100/103	24.8; 99/101	17.2; 50/53	18.0; 61/64	2.8; 11	1.2; 5	0.9; 5	–	0.6; 2	–	8.7; 11/14	0.4
Simple Lógica	3–14 Dec	1,204	68.2	18.8	23.2	17.7	20.4	–	–	–	–	–	–	8.7	2.8
IMOP/El Confidencial	10–13 Dec	1,036	?	19.6	25.8	15.5	20.6	3.0	1.6	1.2	1.6	0.9	–	8.0	5.2
Metroscopia/Henneo	10–12 Dec	1,895	68	18.0; 68	22.2; 89	17.9; 63	20.5; 70	? 15	? 6	? 6	–	? 3	? 1	11.5; 29	1.7
CIS (El Confidencial)	1–12 Dec	2,984	?	22.5; 93	24.4; 96	18.3; 61	19.1; 70	3.5; 13	1.3; 4	1.2; 6	2.5; 0	0.8; 2	? 1	4.0; 4	1.9
CIS (SocioMétrica)	1–12 Dec	2,984	69.7	22.8	24.1	17.6	19.8	3.7	1.2	1.3	1.4	0.9	–	4.5	1.3
Celeste-Tel/eldiario.es	3–11 Dec	1,100	66.7	24.7; 98/101	25.2; 100/103	16.2; 48/50	19.4; 63/66	2.9; 11/12	1.5; 6	1.0; 5	0.8; 0	0.6; 3	0.3; 1	6.8; 10/11	0.5
Target Point/OKDiario	7 Dec	?	69–70	22.8; 99/101	24.9; 100/102	17.2; 52/54	20.6; 65/67	–	–	–	–	–	–	5.9; 7/9	2.1
InvyMark/laSexta	3–7 Dec	1,200	?	22.9	23.2	14.8	22.9	–	–	–	–	–	–	7.3	0.3
SocioMétrica/El Español	5 Dec	?	?	20.3; 81	25.0; 106	16.0; 46	18.8; 64	3.1; 13	1.5; 6	1.1; 6	–	0.7; 2	0.3; 1	11.0; 25	4.7
ElectoPanel/Electomanía	3–4 Dec	1,530	?	19.1; 76	19.3; 79	17.6; 61	21.4; 80	3.1; 11	1.6; 5	1.3; 6	1.6; 0	0.8; 2	–	10.4; 29	2.1
Simple Lógica	2–14 Nov	1,019	68.2	19.6	24.1	18.1	22.4	–	–	–	–	–	–	–	1.7
CIS (SocioMétrica)	1–11 Nov	2,974	62.4	22.5	26.3	17.1	19.8	3.6	1.2	0.9	1.8	1.0	0.3	3.2	3.8
Celeste-Tel/eldiario.es	5–9 Nov	1,100	64.6	25.8; 99/102	26.9; 106/109	17.3; 50/52	20.4; 66/68	2.8; 11/12	1.6; 6	1.0; 5	0.9; 0	0.7; 3	0.3; 1	1.5; 0	1.1
NC Report/La Razón	5–9 Nov	1,000	65.1	26.3; 104/107	26.5; 103/106	17.0; 47/50	19.9; 64/67	2.9; 11/12	1.4; 5/6	0.9; 5/6	–	0.7; 2/3	0.3; 1	2.1; 1	0.2
InvyMark/laSexta	5–9 Nov	?	?	24.2	25.4	17.0	22.7	–	–	–	–	–	–	–	1.2
GAD3/La Vanguardia	2–7 Nov	1,208	72.0	22.3; 92	26.6; 109	16.6; 48	21.9; 75	2.9; 11	1.4; 6	1.3; 6	–	0.6; 2	0.1; 0	3.4; 1	4.3
KeyData/Público	30 Oct	?	76.2	22.2; 92	24.6; 105	17.5; 56	21.3; 74	3.0; 11	0.8; 3	0.5; 4	–	0.9; 3	0.1; 1	1.5; 1	2.4
GESOP/El Periódico	22–30 Oct	911	?	21.3; 89/93	25.3; 106/109	16.1; 48/50	21.8; 73/75	3.3; 13/14	1.5; 5/6	–	–	–	–	4.3; 3/5	3.5
PP	28 Oct	?	?	23.9	24.4	16.0	20.0	–	–	–	–	–	–	<3.0	0.5
InvyMark/laSexta	22–26 Oct	?	?	24.2	25.7	17.3	22.0	–	–	–	–	–	–	–	1.5
ElectoPanel/Electomanía	20–26 Oct	1,037	?	23.1; 96	22.0; 87	18.5; 65	21.9; 75	3.1; 12	1.5; 5	1.2; 6	1.2; 0	0.8; 2	0.3; 0	3.6; 2	1.1
Cs	25 Oct	?	?	22.0	26.0	17.0	24.0	–	–	–	–	–	–	–	2.0
Metroscopia/Henneo	16–18 Oct	1,588	66–67	22.6	25.2	17.7	19.2	–	–	–	–	–	–	5.1	2.6
NC Report/La Razón	1–11 Oct	1,000	65.2	26.7; 107/109	26.8; 105/107	16.8; 45/48	19.5; 62/65	3.0; 11/12	1.4; 5/6	1.1; 5/6	–	0.7; 2/3	0.3; 1	1.9; 1	0.1
CIS (Sigma Dos)	1–9 Oct	2,973	?	23.0	26.2	18.0	20.7	–	–	–	–	–	–	–	3.2
CIS (El Confidencial)	1–9 Oct	2,973	?	23.7	25.6	18.2	21.8	–	–	–	–	–	–	–	1.9
CIS (SocioMétrica)	1–9 Oct	2,973	?	21.6	24.7	18.3	22.3	2.6	1.6	0.9	1.8	1.0	0.3	1.5	2.4
CIS (Metroscopia)	1–9 Oct	2,973	?	24.4	26.2	17.9	22.8	–	–	–	–	–	–	–	1.8
Simple Lógica	1–5 Oct	1,055	66.1	23.8	25.2	17.3	21.6	–	–	–	–	–	–	–	1.4
Celeste-Tel/eldiario.es	1–5 Oct	1,100	64.4	26.3; 101/104	27.7; 109/112	17.4; 47/51	19.3; 60/62	3.0; 11/12	1.7; 6	1.1; 5	0.8; 0	0.8; 3	0.3; 1	1.0; 0	1.4
ElectoPanel/Electomanía	30 Sep–5 Oct	?	?	23.6; 96	22.4; 88	18.7; 66	22.2; 75	3.1; 11	1.5; 5	1.2; 5	1.3; 0	0.8; 2	0.3; 0	2.5; 2	1.2
Simple Lógica/El Debate	2 Oct	1,000	?	21.2	25.3	15.9	23.1	–	–	–	2.2	–	–	2.0	2.2
InvyMark/laSexta	24–28 Sep	?	?	24.6	24.6	17.8	22.3	–	–	–	–	–	–	–	Tie
DYM/El Independiente	17–19 Sep	1,017	?	23.4	26.5	16.2	22.7	–	–	–	–	–	–	3.0	3.1
Metroscopia/Henneo	17–19 Sep	1,095	63	22.8	27.7	15.1	20.8	–	–	–	–	–	–	–	4.9
InvyMark/laSexta	10–14 Sep	?	?	24.1	25.0	18.6	22.1	–	–	–	–	–	–	–	0.9
IMOP/El Confidencial	6–11 Sep	1,012	71.5	20.3	26.5	15.4	23.9	2.8	1.5	1.2	2.1	0.7	–	3.0	2.6
CIS (Dialoga Consultores)	1–11 Sep	2,972	?	23.4	26.6	17.9	20.0	3.3	1.6	1.1	0.9	0.9	0.2	1.1	3.2
CIS (El Confidencial)	1–11 Sep	2,972	?	24.0; 98	25.2; 97	17.6; 55	20.3; 71	3.5; 12	2.3; 8	1.1; 6	–	0.8; 2	0.2; 1	–	1.2
CIS (Metroscopia)	1–11 Sep	2,972	?	24.9	26.1	17.8	20.3	–	–	–	–	–	–	–	1.2
CIS (SocioMétrica)	1–11 Sep	2,972	?	23.5	25.6	17.6	20.1	3.2	1.4	1.1	–	0.9	–	–	2.1
ElectoPanel/Electomanía	7–9 Sep	1,050	?	24.6; 102	24.9; 94	17.8; 61	19.8; 68	3.0; 11	1.6; 5	1.3; 6	1.3; 0	0.8; 2	0.3; 0	1.6; 1	0.3
Simple Lógica	3–7 Sep	1,010	68.8	21.1	24.8	16.6	23.2	–	–	–	–	–	–	–	1.6
Celeste-Tel/eldiario.es	3–7 Sep	1,100	64.2	26.4; 103/106	28.2; 112/115	17.1; 43/51	18.7; 56/59	3.0; 11/12	1.7; 6	1.1; 5	0.8; 0	0.8; 3	0.3; 1	0.7; 0	1.8
GAD3/ABC	3–7 Sep	1,001	?	25.9; 106	27.0; 106	15.9; 43	20.6; 68	2.8; 11	1.9; 7	1.1; 6	–	0.7; 2	–	1.5; 1	1.1
NC Report/La Razón	27–31 Aug	1,000	64.6	27.5; 108/112	27.8; 108/110	16.0; 43/47	18.8; 61/63	3.0; 11/12	1.5; 5/6	1.1; 5/6	–	0.8; 2/3	0.3; 1	1.4; 0	0.3
SocioMétrica/El Español	22–30 Aug	1,200	?	22.6; 90	25.8; 103	16.5; 48	23.1; 81	3.0; 12	1.5; 6	1.3; 6	1.5; 0	0.7; 2	0.5; 1	1.8; 1	2.7
JM&A/Público	20 Aug	?	69.8	21.2; 85	26.3; 110	16.8; 49	22.0; 77	2.8; 10	2.2; 8	1.4; 6	–	0.8; 2	0.3; 1	2.5; 2	4.3
JM&A/Público	10 Aug	?	69.0	21.4	26.4	16.8	22.0	2.7	2.2	1.4	–	0.8	0.3	2.3	4.4
Celeste-Tel/eldiario.es	1–7 Aug	1,100	64.3	25.5; 101/104	28.0; 111/114	17.3; 48/53	19.4; 58/60	3.0; 11/12	1.6; 6	1.1; 5	1.0; 0	0.9; 3	0.3; 1	0.6; 0	2.5
Simple Lógica	1–3 Aug	1,029	65.8	24.4	25.5	15.3	23.4	–	–	–	–	–	–	–	1.1
ElectoPanel/Electomanía	27 Jul–3 Aug	1,100	?	22.9; 94	24.7; 92	18.7; 65	21.2; 75	3.3; 12	1.4; 4	1.3; 6	1.6; 0	0.8; 2	–	1.0; 0	1.8
NC Report/La Razón	23–27 Jul	1,000	62.4	26.7; 106/109	27.4; 105/108	15.8; 47/49	19.2; 64/66	3.1; 10/11	1.5; 5/6	1.2; 6	–	0.8; 2	0.3; 1	1.4; 0	0.7
InvyMark/laSexta	23–27 Jul	?	?	24.4	26.0	18.3	21.1	–	–	–	–	–	–	–	1.6
GAD3/ABC	24–26 Jul	804	70	26.2; 104	27.9; 113	15.1; 40	19.6; 66	3.0; 11	1.9; 7	1.1; 6	1.4; 0	0.8; 2	0.3; 1	0.9; 0	1.7
Demoscopia Servicios/Okdiario	22–25 Jul	1,080	?	27.1; 109	25.3; 99	16.8; 52	20.8; 67	2.5; 8	1.8; 6	1.3; 6	–	0.7; 2	0.6; 1	–	1.8
Metroscopia/Henneo	16–25 Jul	2,260	64	24.4	26.6	16.1	20.1	–	–	–	–	–	–	–	2.2
ElectoPanel/Electomanía	17–22 Jul	2,848	?	21.0; 84	26.1; 104	18.5; 65	20.8; 72	3.1; 11	1.4; 4	1.3; 6	1.7; 0	0.9; 3	–	1.7; 1	5.1
InvyMark/laSexta	9–13 Jul	?	?	23.4	26.5	18.1	21.9	–	–	–	–	–	–	–	3.1
Sigma Dos/El Mundo	9–12 Jul	1,000	?	22.3	26.3	16.1	24.2	3.2	1.2	1.1	–	–	–	–	2.1
Top Position/Merca2	10–11 Jul	1,200	?	23.5	23.8	17.1	22.1	3.5	–	–	–	–	–	1.8	0.3
JM&A/Público	10 Jul	?	69.8	19.7; 75	26.4; 108	17.5; 55	23.6; 84	2.4; 8	2.4; 9	1.5; 6	–	0.7; 2	0.4; 1	2.4; 2	2.8
CIS	1–10 Jul	2,485	?	20.4	29.9	15.6	20.4	3.9	1.3	1.2	–	0.6	0.2	–	9.5
Simple Lógica	2–6 Jul	1,048	68.0	18.7	27.2	17.3	26.0	–	–	–	–	–	–	–	1.2
Celeste-Tel/eldiario.es	2–6 Jul	1,100	63.4	24.2; 97/99	27.1; 106/109	17.7; 51/56	20.6; 62/64	3.1; 11/12	1.6; 8	1.1; 5	1.1; 0	0.9; 3	0.3; 1	0.5; 0	2.9
NC Report/La Razón	25–30 Jun	1,000	62.4	25.2; 102/104	26.3; 103/105	16.2; 49/52	20.6; 67/70	3.1; 10/11	1.4; 5/6	1.2; 6	–	0.8; 2	0.3; 1	–	1.1
SocioMétrica/El Español	19–22 Jun	1,000	?	19.5; 74	23.9; 94	16.9; 57	25.3; 98	2.9; 12	1.3; 4	1.3; 6	1.6; 0	0.8; 2	0.5; 1	2.1; 2	1.4
InvyMark/laSexta	18–22 Jun	?	?	22.9	26.7	17.9	22.1	–	–	–	–	–	–	–	3.8
GESOP/El Periódico	11–13 Jun	800	?	21.0; 79/83	28.6; 116/120	16.6; 47/50	22.8; 75/80	2.6; 8/10	1.6; 5/7	–	–	–	–	–	5.8
DYM/El Independiente	11–12 Jun	1,019	?	24.9	27.1	14.6	20.6	–	–	–	–	–	–	–	2.2
NC Report/La Razón	1–9 Jun	1,200	60.6	25.5; 105/108	24.9; 96/99	16.7; 50/53	21.0; 69/72	3.1; 10/11	1.5; 5/6	1.2; 6	–	0.8; 2	0.3; 1	1.3; 0	0.6
JM&A/Público	8 Jun	?	70.3	18.1; 65	23.5; 91	19.5; 66	25.8; 99	2.1; 7	2.7; 10	1.7; 7	–	0.6; 2	0.4; 1	2.5; 2	2.3
GAD3/ABC	7–8 Jun	800	72	25.6; 101	28.8; 118	13.1; 34	21.1; 70	3.2; 13	1.6; 5	1.0; 5	1.4; 0	0.8; 3	0.3; 1	1.1; 0	3.2
Simple Lógica	4–8 Jun	1,030	69.7	20.6	26.7	16.5	25.7	–	–	–	–	–	–	–	1.0
Celeste-Tel/eldiario.es	4–8 Jun	1,100	62.1	24.3; 98/102	25.8; 102/105	17.4; 50/54	21.1; 65/68	3.0; 11	1.5; 6	1.2; 6	1.3; 0	0.9; 2/3	0.3; 1	0.4; 0	1.5
InvyMark/laSexta	4–8 Jun	?	?	23.7	25.1	17.3	22.2	–	–	–	–	–	–	–	1.4
ElectoPanel/Electomanía	6–7 Jun	846	?	17.1; 68	25.2; 100	20.5; 73	22.5; 83	3.0; 11	1.3; 5	1.3; 5	2.1; 0	1.2; 4	0.3; 0	2.1; 1	2.7
ElectoPanel/Electomanía	26 May–2 Jun	2,043	?	18.0; 72	22.0; 86	20.9; 73	24.2; 93	2.9; 11	1.4; 4	1.2; 5	2.0; 0	1.3; 5	0.3; 0	2.5; 1	2.2
InvyMark/laSexta	28–29 May	?	?	23.5	22.6	17.3	26.4	–	–	–	–	–	–	–	2.9
ElectoPanel/Electomanía	26–28 May	1,425	?	17.9; 72	23.0; 90	20.1; 71	24.0; 90	3.0; 12	1.7; 5	1.3; 6	2.0; 0	1.1; 3	0.3; 0	3.1; 1	1.0
IMOP/El Confidencial	23–28 May	1,015	70.0	19.6	20.6	19.7	28.6	2.4	1.8	1.2	2.0	0.7	–	–	8.0
SocioMétrica/El Español	17–26 May	1,700	?	16.8; 63	20.3; 85	19.3; 66	28.5; 108	3.3; 12	1.5; 4	1.4; 7	1.5; 0	1.0; 3	0.4; 1	1.9; 1	8.2
NC Report/La Razón	16–25 May	1,000	62.5	25.6; 105/109	23.6; 90/93	15.8; 47/51	24.4; 78/81	2.9; 10/11	1.4; 5/6	1.1; 6	–	0.8; 2	0.3; 1	1.2; 0	1.2
Simple Lógica	3–10 May	1,067	67.3	20.9	20.1	17.2	29.6	–	–	–	–	–	–	–	8.7
Metroscopia/El País	7–9 May	1,726	65	19.5; 76	19.0; 75	19.8; 64	29.1; 110	–	–	–	–	–	–	–	9.3
Celeste-Tel/eldiario.es	2–7 May	1,100	62.7	24.7	24.2	16.9	23.5	–	–	–	–	–	–	0.4	0.5
Celeste-Tel/PSOE	26–30 Apr	1,000	62.7	26.0; 109	24.9; 94	17.7; 54	19.7; 66	3.6; 12	1.5; 6	1.2; 6	–	0.8; 2	0.3; 1	–	1.1
GESOP/El Periódico	12–18 Apr	1,000	?	21.0; 79/82	20.5; 75/79	18.1; 55/59	28.5; 110/114	3.0; 10/11	2.0; 7/8	–	–	–	–	–	7.5
InvyMark/laSexta	9–13 Apr	?	?	24.8	22.3	17.1	25.2	–	–	–	–	–	–	–	0.4
NC Report/La Razón	9–13 Apr	1,000	63.0	26.3; 110/113	23.5; 88/91	16.2; 46/49	24.3; 76/79	2.9; 10/11	1.4; 5/6	1.1; 6	–	0.8; 2	0.3; 1	0.9; 0	2.0
CIS (JM&A)	1–10 Apr	2,466	67.1	24.4	20.9	19.6	24.6	2.9	1.9	0.8	–	0.6	–	–	0.2
CIS (SocioMétrica)	1–10 Apr	2,466	?	23.8	20.7	18.5	25.3	2.9	1.6	1.4	2.0	0.7	0.1	–	1.5
CIS	1–10 Apr	2,466	?	24.0	22.0	19.6	22.4	3.0	1.7	1.3	–	0.6	0.3	–	1.6
Simple Lógica	2–9 Apr	1,062	66.9	19.0	20.2	17.6	29.9	–	–	–	–	–	–	–	9.7
Celeste-Tel/eldiario.es	2–6 Apr	1,100	?	24.9; 100/103	24.1; 88/92	16.6; 48/51	24.0; 83/86	2.9; 10/11	1.5; 6	1.2; 5/6	1.3; 0	0.9; 2/3	0.3; 1	0.3; 0	0.8
Metroscopia/El País	4–5 Apr	1,278	65	20.4	19.1	18.3	28.7	–	–	–	–	–	–	–	8.3
JM&A/Público	1 Apr	?	68.5	22.4; 88	20.4; 77	18.1; 59	26.4; 97	2.9; 11	2.2; 8	1.6; 7	–	0.8; 2	0.4; 1	–	4.0
SocioMétrica/El Español	19–29 Mar	1,000	72.0	21.9; 87	19.4; 78	16.2; 47	27.4; 107	4.0; 15	1.5; 5	1.1; 6	–	0.9; 3	0.5; 1	1.5; 1	5.5
Sigma Dos/El Mundo	23–27 Mar	1,000	?	23.3	19.7	18.4	26.7	3.3	1.3	1.2	–	–	–	–	3.4
MyWord/Cadena SER	13–16 Mar	1,002	?	24.7	20.4	16.0	23.8	–	–	–	–	–	–	–	0.9
InvyMark/laSexta	12–16 Mar	?	?	25.1	22.6	16.8	25.0	2.4	2.4	1.2	–	–	–	–	0.1
GAD3/La Vanguardia	12–14 Mar	1,008	69.0	23.8; 92/94	22.1; 86/88	16.7; 52/53	27.3; 91/93	2.9; 10/11	1.6; 5/6	1.4; 6	–	0.6; 2	0.3; 1	–	3.5
Simple Lógica	1–7 Mar	1,076	67.5	20.0	21.0	17.3	29.6	–	–	–	–	–	–	–	8.6
Celeste-Tel/eldiario.es	1–7 Mar	1,100	63.7	26.6; 110/113	24.3; 89/91	16.2; 45/48	23.5; 77/80	2.6; 10/11	1.6; 6	1.3; 5/6	1.2; 0	0.9; 2/3	0.3; 1	0.3; 0	2.3
Metroscopia/El País	2–5 Mar	1,175	66	21.5	19.4	17.0	28.9	–	–	–	–	–	–	–	7.4
InvyMark/laSexta	26 Feb–2 Mar	?	?	26.0	23.1	16.5	24.0	–	–	–	–	–	–	–	2.0
NC Report/La Razón	26 Feb–2 Mar	1,000	62.0	27.9; 112/116	24.0; 89/93	15.8; 43/46	22.1; 74/75	2.8; 10/11	1.5; 5/6	1.2; 6	–	0.8; 2/3	0.3; 1	0.7; 0	3.9
IMOP/El Confidencial	22–27 Feb	1,402	72.5	21.4; 82	21.5; 82	17.0; 52	28.5; 108	3.0; 11	1.7; 6	1.1; 5	2.0; 1	0.8; 2	? 1	–	7.0
InvyMark/laSexta	12–16 Feb	?	?	25.9	22.8	16.5	23.8	–	–	–	–	–	–	–	2.1
MyWord/Cadena SER	7–14 Feb	1,000	?	24.5	21.3	16.6	22.1	–	–	–	–	–	–	–	2.4
JM&A/Público	11 Feb	?	68.5	23.7; 95	22.4; 85	17.0; 51	24.6; 91	3.0; 10	2.2; 8	1.6; 7	–	0.8; 2	0.4; 1	–	0.9
Celeste-Tel/eldiario.es	5–9 Feb	1,100	63.1	28.9; 118/123	25.5; 92/95	16.5; 47/52	19.3; 61/63	2.7; 10/11	1.6; 6	1.3; 5/6	1.2; 0	0.9; 2/3	0.3; 1	0.2; 0	3.4
Metroscopia/El País	5–8 Feb	1,321	70	21.9	20.1	16.8	28.3	–	–	–	–	–	–	–	6.4
Simple Lógica	1–7 Feb	1,065	68.4	22.2	21.4	17.0	28.7	–	–	–	–	–	–	–	6.5
GAD3/ABC	31 Jan–7 Feb	1,002	?	25.8; 100/105	23.7; 93/96	14.8; 42/44	25.6; 83/88	2.9; 10/11	1.8; 6	1.2; 5/6	–	0.8; 2	0.3; 0/1	–	0.2
Cs	31 Jan	?	?	23.3	24.1	16.9	25.0	–	–	–	–	–	–	–	0.9
InvyMark/laSexta	22–26 Jan	?	?	26.1	23.0	16.2	23.4	–	–	–	–	–	–	–	2.7
CIS (JM&A)	2–14 Jan	2,477	68.4	26.6	21.8	17.8	22.0	–	–	–	–	–	–	–	4.6
CIS (SocioMétrica)	2–14 Jan	2,477	?	25.5	21.5	17.7	23.2	–	–	–	–	–	–	–	2.3
CIS	2–14 Jan	2,477	?	26.3	23.1	19.0	20.7	3.4	2.0	1.2	–	0.8	0.2	–	3.2
Metroscopia/El País	9–11 Jan	1,332	70	23.2; 90	21.6; 80	15.1; 55	27.1; 95	–	–	–	–	–	–	–	3.9
GAD3/ABC	8–11 Jan	800	71	24.7; 97/101	24.2; 93/97	14.7; 42/44	26.2; 86/90	2.9; 10/11	1.9; 6	1.3; 5/7	–	0.7; 2	0.3; 0/1	–	1.5
Simple Lógica	2–8 Jan	1,079	68.5	21.8	23.4	17.8	24.1	–	–	–	–	–	–	–	0.7
Celeste-Tel/eldiario.es	2–5 Jan	1,100	61.9	29.8; 123/128	25.1; 92/96	16.9; 49/54	18.6; 54/59	2.5; 9/10	1.7; 6/7	1.2; 5/6	1.2; 0	0.9; 2/3	0.3; 1	0.2; 0	4.7

===== 2017 =====
Polling firm/Commissioner	Fieldwork date	Sample size	Turnout	PP	PSOE	Unidos Podemos	Cs	ERC–Sobiranistes	PDeCAT	PNV	PACMA	EH Bildu	CCa	Vox	Lead
NC Report/La Razón	26–30 Dec	1,000	59.8	30.0; 124/127	23.8; 88/93	16.1; 49/55	18.8; 55/57	3.0; 9/10	1.3; 6/7	1.1; 5	–	0.8; 2	0.3; 1	0.7; 0	6.2
InvyMark/laSexta	25–29 Dec	?	?	27.6	23.3	15.7	22.4	2.3	2.3	–	–	–	–	–	4.3
SocioMétrica/El Español	22–29 Dec	1,000	76.7	24.1; 97	22.5; 89	16.2; 49	23.9; 86	3.5; 13	1.9; 6	1.1; 6	1.4; 0	0.7; 2	0.5; 1	1.7; 1	0.2
JM&A/Público	26 Dec	?	66.4	25.8; 106	23.0; 86	17.6; 56	22.4; 75	2.9; 11	1.9; 7	1.4; 6	–	0.8; 2	0.3; 1	–	2.8
Simple Lógica	5–13 Dec	1,077	70.1	24.8	23.8	16.3	22.8	–	–	–	–	–	–	–	1.0
Celeste-Tel/eldiario.es	1–7 Dec	1,100	61.1	30.2	24.7	17.4	17.7	–	–	–	–	–	–	–	5.5
InvyMark/laSexta	13–17 Nov	?	?	30.1	25.3	17.0	16.4	2.8	1.6	–	–	–	–	–	4.8
Celeste-Tel/eldiario.es	6–10 Nov	1,100	60.2	30.3; 125/128	24.2; 90/93	17.7; 50/55	17.5; 54/57	2.7; 10/11	1.3; 4	1.2; 5/6	1.3; 0	0.9; 2/3	0.3; 1	–	6.1
Metroscopia/El País	6–8 Nov	1,730	70	26.1	22.7	14.7	22.7	–	–	–	–	–	–	–	3.4
Simple Lógica	2–8 Nov	1,071	70.3	27.1	24.8	15.1	21.6	–	–	–	–	–	–	–	2.3
SocioMétrica/El Español	27 Oct–3 Nov	800	?	27.5; 117	24.8; 95	15.7; 45	20.6; 70	2.1; 8	1.7; 6	1.0; 5	–	0.6; 2	0.3; 1	2.0; 1	2.7
InvyMark/laSexta	30 Oct–2 Nov	1,200	?	30.3	25.1	17.5	15.8	–	–	–	–	–	–	–	5.2
Sigma Dos/El Mundo	23–26 Oct	1,250	?	31.4	26.0	15.3	16.7	3.0	1.4	1.4	–	–	–	–	5.4
InvyMark/laSexta	16–20 Oct	1,100	?	30.0	24.9	19.5	14.6	–	–	–	–	–	–	–	5.1
JM&A/Público	14 Oct	?	67.8	27.6; 111	22.0; 81	21.0; 68	18.2; 63	2.8; 10	1.8; 8	1.3; 6	–	0.7; 2	0.3; 1	–	5.6
NC Report/La Razón	11–14 Oct	1,000	58.7	31.4; 128/131	22.0; 84/89	17.5; 54/58	17.8; 50/53	3.0; 10/11	1.3; 5/6	1.1; 5	–	0.8; 2	0.3; 1	0.6; 0	9.4
CIS (SocioMétrica)	2–11 Oct	2,487	?	27.2	24.9	15.5	18.7	2.9	1.4	1.4	1.1	0.7	0.3	–	2.3
CIS	2–11 Oct	2,487	?	28.0	24.2	18.5	17.5	2.7	1.6	1.3	–	0.7	0.3	–	3.8
DYM/El Confidencial	26 Sep–11 Oct	982	?	29.9	24.0	16.9	17.5	–	–	–	–	–	–	–	5.9
Celeste-Tel/eldiario.es	9–10 Oct	1,100	59.4	30.6; 126/128	23.6; 89/90	18.1; 52/58	17.2; 54/56	2.8; 10/11	1.3; 4	1.2; 4/6	1.4; 0	0.9; 2/3	0.3; 1	–	7.0
Simple Lógica	2–10 Oct	1,053	67.7	27.7	24.2	16.6	20.7	–	–	–	–	–	–	–	3.5
GAD3/ABC	2–6 Oct	1,238	?	29.8; 125	21.8; 86	17.9; 55	19.5; 58	3.1; 11	1.8; 6	1.2; 5	–	1.0; 3	0.3; 1	–	8.0
InvyMark/laSexta	11–15 Sep	?	?	30.2	24.5	20.0	14.1	–	–	–	–	–	–	–	5.7
Simple Lógica	5–14 Sep	1,078	68.1	30.1	25.0	18.8	15.8	–	–	–	–	–	–	–	5.1
GAD3/ABC	4–8 Sep	1,000	69	31.9; 131	23.9; 94	18.3; 57	15.8; 41	3.5; 14	1.3; 4	1.4; 6	–	0.7; 2	0.3; 1	–	8.0
Celeste-Tel/eldiario.es	1–8 Sep	1,100	60.1	30.9; 129/132	25.4; 94/96	18.7; 59/63	14.9; 40/42	2.9; 10/11	1.3; 4/5	1.2; 5	1.3; 0	0.9; 2	0.3; 1	–	5.5
MyWord/Cadena SER	4–7 Sep	1,003	?	30.9	26.1	17.5	14.1	–	–	–	–	–	–	–	4.8
Sigma Dos/El Mundo	4–7 Sep	1,000	?	30.8	26.4	19.5	12.7	2.3	1.3	1.2	–	–	–	–	4.4
JM&A/Público	1 Sep	?	67.4	28.1; 114	23.4; 89	20.0; 64	17.4; 56	2.9; 11	1.9; 7	1.4; 6	–	0.7; 2	0.3; 1	–	4.7
Simple Lógica	1–10 Aug	?	?	30.8	25.0	18.8	13.7	–	–	–	–	–	–	–	5.8
Celeste-Tel/eldiario.es	1–7 Aug	1,100	59.8	31.1; 130/133	25.0; 92/94	18.9; 60/63	14.9; 40/42	2.9; 11	1.4; 5	1.2; 4/5	1.3; 0	0.9; 2/3	0.3; 1	–	6.1
Redondo & Asociados	31 Jul	?	?	28.7	23.8	19.6	14.3	–	–	–	–	–	–	–	4.9
Metroscopia/El País	14–18 Jul	1,700	69	26.9	22.0	19.7	18.5	–	–	–	–	–	–	–	4.9
InvyMark/laSexta	10–14 Jul	?	?	30.7	23.4	21.3	13.6	–	–	–	–	–	–	–	7.3
MyWord/Cadena SER	7–12 Jul	1,003	?	29.2	23.6	19.0	14.5	–	–	–	–	–	–	–	5.6
Simple Lógica	3–10 Jul	1,003	69.8	27.2	24.1	20.4	17.2	–	–	–	–	–	–	–	3.1
CIS	1–10 Jul	2,490	?	28.8	24.9	20.3	14.5	2.9	1.7	1.0	–	0.8	0.4	–	3.9
NC Report/La Razón	9 Jul	1,000	58.2	34.2; 142/146	22.3; 80/84	19.1; 65/68	13.9; 31/35	2.9; 10/11	1.2; 5/6	1.0; 5	–	0.9; 2	0.3; 1	0.4; 0	11.9
Celeste-Tel/eldiario.es	3–7 Jul	1,100	59.3	31.6; 133/136	24.4; 89/92	18.8; 60/63	15.1; 41/43	2.9; 11	1.3; 5	1.1; 4/5	1.4; 0	0.8; 2/3	0.3; 1	–	7.2
JM&A/Público	5 Jul	?	68.6	29.2; 124	25.5; 96	18.5; 58	15.3; 46	2.8; 10	1.9; 7	1.1; 5	–	0.9; 3	0.3; 1	–	3.7
InvyMark/laSexta	26–30 Jun	?	?	30.0	24.2	21.1	13.8	–	–	–	–	–	–	–	5.8
Metroscopia/El País	27–28 Jun	1,017	69	25.5	21.6	20.6	18.8	–	–	–	–	–	–	–	3.9
DYM/El Confidencial	22–28 Jun	1,219	?	30.9	25.0	17.5	15.8	–	–	–	–	–	–	–	5.9
InvyMark/laSexta	12–16 Jun	?	?	30.4	23.6	21.0	14.2	–	–	–	–	–	–	–	6.8
SocioMétrica/El Español	6–16 Jun	800	?	26.7; 120	24.2; 89	19.1; 58	18.1; 56	3.3; 11	2.0; 7	1.2; 6	–	0.9; 2	0.5; 1	–	2.5
Simple Lógica	5–9 Jun	1,004	70.5	29.9	25.3	18.6	16.8	–	–	–	–	–	–	–	4.6
InvyMark/laSexta	5–9 Jun	?	?	30.9	23.0	20.9	14.3	–	–	–	–	–	–	–	7.9
Celeste-Tel/eldiario.es	1–7 Jun	1,100	59.1	31.9; 134/137	23.5; 87/90	19.0; 61/64	14.5; 39/42	2.8; 11	1.4; 8	1.2; 4/5	1.6; 0	1.0; 2/3	0.3; 1	–	8.4
MyWord/Cadena SER	30 May–1 Jun	1,008	?	28.6	24.8	18.9	15.7	–	–	–	–	–	–	–	3.8
GAD3/ABC	29 May–1 Jun	805	65	30.7; 127	25.9; 100	17.8; 56	15.4; 41	2.9; 12	1.5; 5	1.4; 6	–	0.8; 2	0.3; 1	–	4.8
Metroscopia/El País	29 May–1 Jun	1,768	69	25.9	22.8	19.2	18.7	–	–	–	–	–	–	–	3.1
NC Report/La Razón	22 May–1 Jun	1,000	58.4	36.0; 149/155	20.5; 75/78	20.2; 66/71	12.6; 25/29	2.8; 10/11	1.5; 6/7	1.1; 5	–	0.9; 2	0.3; 1	0.3; 0	15.5
InvyMark/laSexta	22–26 May	?	?	31.2	22.8	20.8	14.1	–	–	–	–	–	–	–	8.4
Redondo & Asociados	22 May	?	?	29.0	23.0	22.0	16.0	–	–	–	–	–	–	–	6.0
InvyMark/laSexta	15–19 May	?	?	31.7	22.0	21.2	14.2	–	–	–	–	–	–	–	9.7
Simple Lógica	3–12 May	1,002	65.1	30.9	22.3	19.8	14.8	–	–	–	–	–	–	–	8.6
Sigma Dos/El Mundo	8–10 May	1,200	?	31.1	23.5	21.6	14.3	2.6	1.0	1.2	–	–	–	–	7.6
Celeste-Tel/eldiario.es	2–5 May	1,100	57.8	34.8; 147/150	22.5; 80/85	19.3; 67/68	12.7; 25/28	2.8; 10/11	1.5; 6/7	1.2; 5	1.2; 0	0.9; 2/3	0.3; 1	–	12.3
InvyMark/laSexta	2–5 May	?	?	32.0	21.7	21.6	13.8	–	–	–	–	–	–	–	10.3
JM&A/Público	2 May	?	68.3	27.0; 113	22.7; 87	21.8; 74	17.1; 53	2.7; 10	1.8; 6	1.1; 3	–	0.9; 3	0.3; 1	–	4.3
SocioMétrica/El Español	5–12 Apr	800	?	31.6; 133	21.2; 81	19.4; 59	16.7; 50	2.8; 11	1.9; 7	1.3; 6	–	0.8; 2	0.4; 1	–	10.4
NC Report/La Razón	5–11 Apr	1,000	58.0	36.8; 151/157	21.0; 76/79	20.2; 65/68	11.8; 24/28	2.7; 10/11	1.5; 6/7	1.0; 5	–	0.9; 2	0.3; 1	0.2; 0	15.8
Simple Lógica	3–10 Apr	1,008	68.1	30.8	23.8	19.3	13.9	–	–	–	–	–	–	–	7.0
CIS	1–8 Apr	2,492	?	31.5	19.9	19.7	14.9	2.9	2.0	1.1	–	1.1	0.3	–	11.6
Celeste-Tel/eldiario.es	3–7 Apr	1,100	58.0	35.1; 146/150	22.3; 80/83	19.2; 66/67	12.9; 26/28	2.8; 10	1.5; 7	1.1; 5	1.3; 0	0.9; 2/3	0.3; 1	–	12.8
Metroscopia/El País	30 Mar–6 Apr	3,166	69	30.2	20.2	20.7	17.4	–	–	–	–	–	–	–	9.5
InvyMark/laSexta	27–31 Mar	?	?	33.2	21.4	21.4	12.9	–	–	–	–	–	–	–	11.8
MyWord/Cadena SER	21–26 Mar	1,055	?	30.7	22.6	20.3	14.0	–	–	–	–	–	–	–	8.1
InvyMark/laSexta	13–17 Mar	?	?	32.6	21.0	21.9	13.4	–	–	–	–	–	–	–	10.7
NC Report/La Razón	13–17 Mar	1,000	58.5	37.0; 153/158	20.8; 75/79	20.2; 64/68	11.3; 24/28	2.7; 10/11	1.6; 6/7	1.1; 5	–	1.0; 2	0.3; 1	0.3; 0	16.2
DYM/El Confidencial	7–15 Mar	1,010	?	31.0	20.0	19.9	16.2	–	–	–	–	–	–	–	11.0
JM&A/Público	12 Mar	?	64.7	31.2; 129	18.2; 63	23.7; 81	16.2; 49	2.6; 10	2.2; 9	1.3; 6	–	0.9; 2	0.4; 1	–	7.5
Metroscopia/El País	6–9 Mar	1,230	68	31.2	19.0	21.5	16.5	–	–	–	–	–	–	–	9.7
Simple Lógica	1–9 Mar	1,006	66.1	29.9	20.9	20.0	15.7	–	–	–	–	–	–	–	9.0
Celeste-Tel/eldiario.es	1–7 Mar	1,100	58.1	35.6; 148/150	22.1; 80/83	19.3; 65/66	12.1; 26/28	2.8; 10	1.6; 7	1.2; 5	1.4; 0	0.9; 2/3	0.3; 1	–	13.5
InvyMark/laSexta	27 Feb–3 Mar	?	?	33.2	21.3	21.5	12.8	–	–	–	–	–	–	–	11.7
Sigma Dos/El Mundo	27 Feb–2 Mar	1,000	?	34.3	20.2	21.7	12.6	2.6	1.6	1.3	–	–	–	–	12.6
GESOP/El Periódico	19–22 Feb	1,000	?	32.2; 135/138	21.1; 79/82	21.7; 71/74	14.0; 34/38	2.8; 9/10	1.4; 5/6	–	–	–	–	–	10.5
SocioMétrica/El Español	13–17 Feb	800	?	32.5; 139	18.6; 71	20.2; 63	15.4; 50	3.0; 13	1.5; 5	1.4; 6	–	0.9; 2	0.3; 1	–	12.3
InvyMark/laSexta	13–17 Feb	?	?	33.3	21.1	22.0	12.5	–	–	–	–	–	–	–	11.3
JM&A/Público	13 Feb	?	64.0	32.7	18.0	24.2	14.4	–	–	–	–	–	–	–	8.5
Simple Lógica	6–10 Feb	1,005	68.1	31.0	21.4	22.6	13.7	–	–	–	–	–	–	–	8.4
Celeste-Tel/eldiario.es	1–7 Feb	1,100	58.4	35.7; 148/151	21.3; 78/81	19.7; 65/68	12.1; 26/28	2.8; 9/10	1.8; 7/8	1.2; 5	1.4; 0	0.9; 2/3	0.3; 1	–	14.4
MyWord/Cadena SER	31 Jan–6 Feb	1,000	?	32.7	21.8	20.5	12.6	–	–	–	–	–	–	–	10.9
NC Report/La Razón	28 Jan–2 Feb	1,000	58.0	36.8; 153/157	19.9; 71/76	20.8; 65/69	11.5; 25/30	2.7; 9/10	1.8; 7/8	1.1; 5	–	1.0; 2	0.3; 1	0.3; 0	16.0
GAD3/ABC	25 Jan–2 Feb	805	62	34.2; 146	20.4; 78	20.8; 70	13.8; 32	2.8; 10	1.6; 6	1.2; 5	–	0.8; 2	0.3; 1	–	13.4
InvyMark/laSexta	23–27 Jan	?	?	34.1	20.6	22.6	11.7	–	–	–	–	–	–	–	11.5
Simple Lógica	9–13 Jan	?	?	33.4	18.2	22.6	14.7	–	–	–	–	–	–	–	10.8
InvyMark/laSexta	9–13 Jan	?	?	34.3	20.2	22.9	11.3	2.6	1.6	1.2	–	–	–	–	11.4
Metroscopia/El País	10–12 Jan	1,578	68	33.2	19.1	21.7	15.5	–	–	–	–	–	–	–	11.5
CIS	2–12 Jan	2,490	?	33.0	18.6	21.7	12.4	3.0	1.7	1.8	–	0.9	0.2	–	11.3
Celeste-Tel/eldiario.es	2–9 Jan	1,100	58.7	35.9; 149/152	20.7; 76/79	20.3; 66/69	12.4; 28/30	2.8; 9/10	1.9; 7/8	1.2; 5	1.4; 0	0.9; 2	0.3; 1	–	15.2
GIPEyOP/Mediaflows	14 Dec–4 Jan	5,414	?	34.9	19.9	20.6	13.3	2.9	1.8	1.3	–	1.0	0.3	–	14.3
JM&A/Público	2 Jan	?	63.4	32.1; 134	17.4; 59	24.8; 91	14.8; 38	2.7; 10	2.2; 9	1.3; 6	–	0.9; 2	0.4; 1	–	7.3

===== 2016 =====
Polling firm/Commissioner	Fieldwork date	Sample size	Turnout	PP	PSOE	Unidos Podemos	Cs	ERC–Sobiranistes	PDeCAT	PNV	PACMA	EH Bildu	CCa	Vox	Lead
Sigma Dos/El Mundo	23–29 Dec	1,000	?	34.8	19.4	22.5	12.6	2.7	1.7	1.2	–	–	–	–	12.3
SocioMétrica/El Español	22–29 Dec	800	?	33.0; 139	18.8; 70	21.1; 69	15.5; 47	2.7; 11	1.2; 5	1.5; 6	–	0.8; 2	0.3; 1	–	11.9
InvyMark/laSexta	19–23 Dec	?	?	34.5	20.4	22.4	11.8	–	–	–	–	–	–	–	12.1
Redondo & Asociados	20 Dec	?	?	34.0	20.0	22.0	12.0	–	–	–	–	–	–	–	12.0
NC Report/La Razón	13–17 Dec	1,000	57.8	36.9; 154/159	19.3; 69/73	21.2; 67/72	11.6; 27/31	2.7; 9	1.8; 8	1.1; 5	–	1.0; 1	0.3; 1	0.4; 0	15.7
GAD3/ABC	13–16 Dec	800	63	34.1; 144	19.2; 70	21.6; 75	14.2; 34	2.8; 10	2.1; 8	1.2; 6	–	0.9; 2	0.3; 1	–	12.5
InvyMark/laSexta	12–16 Dec	?	?	34.7	19.9	22.6	12.1	–	–	–	–	–	–	–	12.1
Simple Lógica	1–7 Dec	1,000	66.6	33.9	19.9	21.0	14.5	–	–	–	–	–	–	–	12.9
Celeste-Tel/eldiario.es	1–7 Dec	1,100	58.9	35.9; 151/153	20.2; 72/74	20.7; 66/70	12.7; 28/30	2.8; 9/10	1.9; 7/8	1.2; 5	1.4; 0	0.9; 2	0.3; 1	–	15.2
SocioMétrica/El Español	28 Nov–2 Dec	800	?	32.4; 132	19.6; 73	22.4; 79	15.4; 42	2.8; 11	1.3; 5	1.3; 6	–	0.7; 1	0.3; 1	–	10.0
InvyMark/laSexta	28 Nov–2 Dec	1,200	?	34.3	20.0	22.9	12.4	–	–	–	–	–	–	–	11.4
Metroscopia/El País	23–30 Nov	2,650	67	34.2	17.9	22.9	14.5	–	–	–	–	–	–	–	11.3
MyWord/Cadena SER	17–22 Nov	1,000	?	33.8	18.6	22.5	12.4	–	–	–	–	–	–	–	11.3
NC Report/La Razón	15–19 Nov	1,000	57.3	36.9; 155/159	19.5; 67/71	20.6; 67/73	11.4; 27/30	2.8; 9	1.6; 8	1.1; 5	–	0.9; 3	0.3; 1	0.3; 0	16.3
InvyMark/laSexta	14–18 Nov	?	?	34.8	19.5	22.7	12.1	2.5	1.8	1.2	–	–	–	–	12.1
JM&A/Público	16 Nov	?	62.4	34.0; 141	18.3; 68	24.1; 83	13.1; 32	2.7; 10	2.2; 8	1.3; 5	–	0.8; 2	0.4; 1	–	9.9
Estudio de Sociología Consultores	7–12 Nov	1,100	64.6	36.8	18.1	18.2	14.0	–	–	–	–	–	–	–	18.6
Metroscopia/El País	7–11 Nov	1,302	65	35.7	17.9	23.1	13.0	–	–	–	–	–	–	–	12.6
Simple Lógica	2–8 Nov	1,003	63.7	34.1	17.6	22.9	14.5	–	–	–	–	–	–	–	11.2
Celeste-Tel/eldiario.es	2–7 Nov	1,100	59.3	36.2; 153/156	20.4; 71/76	20.2; 63/69	12.8; 27/30	2.8; 9/10	2.0; 8	1.2; 5	1.3; 0	0.9; 2	0.3; 1	–	15.8
InvyMark/laSexta	31 Oct–4 Nov	?	?	35.0	19.1	22.6	12.4	2.6	1.8	1.2	–	–	–	–	12.4
InvyMark/laSexta	24–28 Oct	?	?	35.3	18.5	23.2	12.0	2.7	1.9	1.2	–	–	–	–	12.1
Metroscopia/El País	10–13 Oct	1,388	65	37.8	18.0	22.1	11.6	–	–	–	–	–	–	–	15.7
Simple Lógica	3–11 Oct	1,002	64.0	36.8	15.9	23.5	13.9	–	–	–	–	–	–	–	13.3
CIS	1–10 Oct	2,491	?	34.5	17.0	21.8	12.8	3.0	1.7	1.3	–	0.8	0.5	–	12.7
NC Report/La Razón	3–7 Oct	500	57.8	36.7	19.9	20.6	11.9	–	–	–	–	–	–	0.3	16.1
Estudio de Sociología Consultores	3–7 Oct	1,100	64.2	36.5	19.4	18.6	12.5	–	–	–	–	–	–	–	17.1
InvyMark/laSexta	3–7 Oct	?	?	34.1	20.0	21.8	13.4	2.6	1.9	1.2	–	–	–	–	12.3
Celeste-Tel/eldiario.es	1–6 Oct	1,100	60.1	36.1; 152/157	20.9; 71/78	20.5; 64/69	12.5; 26/28	2.8; 9/10	2.0; 8	1.2; 5	1.3; 0	0.8; 2	0.3; 1	–	15.2
DYM/El Confidencial	27 Sep–6 Oct	1,132	65	36.2	19.6	21.7	11.8	–	–	–	–	–	–	–	14.5
JM&A/Público	3 Oct	?	61.8	33.0; 137	20.3; 79	22.6; 73	13.4; 34	2.8; 10	2.3; 8	1.3; 6	–	0.8; 2	0.4; 1	–	10.4
SocioMétrica/El Español	26–30 Sep	1,000	59.8	33.8; 140	19.9; 72	21.4; 75	14.6; 37	2.8; 10	1.9; 7	1.4; 6	–	0.9; 2	0.3; 1	–	12.4
GAD3/ABC	5–30 Sep	3,400	61	36.4; 159	18.6; 68	20.8; 69	11.9; 25	2.8; 10	2.1; 8	1.4; 6	–	1.0; 4	0.4; 1	–	15.6
GAD3/ABC	5–28 Sep	2,400	?	35.4; 153	19.8; 76	20.9; 69	11.5; 25	2.7; 9	2.1; 8	1.4; 6	–	1.0; 3	0.4; 1	–	14.5
JM&A/Público	14 Sep	?	64.4	31.5; 131	23.6; 89	20.4; 64	13.7; 38	3.0; 11	2.2; 8	1.3; 6	–	0.9; 2	0.4; 1	–	7.9
MyWord/Cadena SER	9–14 Sep	995	60.4	33.4	22.0	20.6	12.9	–	–	–	–	–	–	–	11.4
Simple Lógica	1–14 Sep	1,046	65.2	33.6	23.7	20.0	12.8	–	–	–	–	–	–	–	9.9
GAD3/ABC	6–9 Sep	802	63	33.9; 142	21.1; 81	20.5; 70	12.9; 30	2.7; 10	2.1; 8	1.2; 6	–	0.8; 2	0.3; 1	–	12.8
InvyMark/laSexta	5–9 Sep	?	?	33.7	21.8	20.1	14.0	–	–	–	–	–	–	–	11.9
Metroscopia/El País	6–8 Sep	1,294	63	34.8	21.3	21.1	12.0	–	–	–	–	–	–	–	13.5
Estudio de Sociología Consultores	1–7 Sep	1,100	67.8	34.7; 145	22.5; 88	19.5; 65	11.5; 25	–	–	–	–	–	–	–	12.2
NC Report/La Razón	29 Aug–3 Sep	1,000	60.1	34.8; 142/146	22.4; 82/85	20.7; 67/70	12.1; 30/31	2.8; 9	1.9; 8	1.2; 5	–	0.8; 2	0.3; 1	0.3; 0	12.4
Celeste-Tel/eldiario.es	22–27 Aug	1,100	61.8	34.0; 139/141	22.3; 83/86	20.9; 68/71	12.7; 30/31	2.5; 9	2.0; 8	1.3; 5	1.3; 0	0.8; 2	0.3; 1	–	11.7
Simple Lógica	1–10 Aug	1,049	65.5	35.4	22.8	21.3	12.3	–	–	–	–	–	–	–	12.6
JM&A/Público	2 Aug	?	62.4	32.7; 137	22.8; 86	21.0; 71	12.8; 29	2.8; 10	2.2; 8	1.3; 6	–	0.8; 2	0.4; 1	–	9.9
NC Report/La Razón	18–25 Jul	1,000	61.0	34.1; 142/144	22.2; 83/85	21.0; 68/72	12.3; 30/31	2.9; 9	2.0; 8	1.2; 5	–	0.7; 2	0.3; 1	0.2; 0	11.9
Simple Lógica	1–15 Jul	1,033	66.8	33.5	22.3	21.6	14.1	–	–	–	–	–	–	–	11.2
CIS	1–11 Jul	2,479	?	32.5	23.1	19.6	12.0	2.9	1.7	1.2	–	0.9	0.1	–	9.4
InvyMark/laSexta	27 Jun–1 Jul	?	?	33.6	22.5	21.2	11.7	–	–	–	–	–	–	–	11.1
2016 general election	26 Jun	—N/a	66.5	33.0; 137	22.6; 85	21.2; 71	13.1; 32	2.7; 9	2.0; 8	1.2; 5	1.2; 0	0.8; 2	0.3; 1	0.2; 0	10.4

==== Voting preferences ====
The table below lists raw, unweighted voting preferences.

Polling firm/Commissioner	Fieldwork date	Sample size	PP	PSOE	Unidas Podemos	Cs	ERC–Sobiranistes	PDeCAT JxCat	PNV	PACMA	EH Bildu	CC	Vox	Question	X mark	Lead
April 2019 general election (Note: Does not include non-resident citizens.)	28 Apr 2019	—N/a	12.5	21.5	10.7	11.9	2.9	1.4	1.1	0.9	0.7	0.4	7.7	—N/a	24.2	9.0
CIS	21 Mar–23 Apr 2019	17,641	7.6	17.2	6.6	5.5	2.1	0.6	0.9	0.9	0.7	–	3.7	44.3	6.3	9.6
40dB/El País	15–18 Apr 2019	2,000	6.6	18.3	11.4	9.7	3.8	1.6	0.7	3.4	0.5	0.2	6.9	26.6	3.2	6.9
DYM/El Independiente	15–17 Apr 2019	1,025	9.1	17.7	7.6	11.5	–	–	–	–	–	–	6.1	28.1	5.1	6.2
Metroscopia/Henneo	11–16 Apr 2019	4,775	12.0	27.5	11.4	12.2	–	–	–	–	–	–	8.5	–	–	15.3
GAD3/La Vanguardia	9–11 Apr 2019	1,800	12.8	26.4	8.3	10.4	3.0	1.0	0.9	–	1.2	–	9.0	–	–	13.6
Simple Lógica	1–5 Apr 2019	1,054	7.5	21.8	10.0	9.3	–	–	–	–	–	–	5.4	22.3	14.9	11.8
GESOP/El Periódico	1–5 Apr 2019	1,500	10.1	20.3	7.9	8.9	3.3	0.7	–	–	–	–	6.8	30.4	11.5	10.2
Metroscopia/Henneo	18–25 Mar 2019	2,722	8.9	20.9	10.1	9.6	–	–	–	–	–	–	8.1	32.7		10.8
40dB/El País	14–19 Mar 2019	1,500	7.6	17.0	7.8	9.9	4.1	1.4	0.7	5.0	0.6	0.3	5.9	28.1	2.7	7.1
CIS	1–18 Mar 2019	16,194	8.5	18.9	6.4	7.1	2.8	0.6	0.8	1.0	0.7	0.2	3.8	38.0	7.0	10.4
Simple Lógica	4–13 Mar 2019	1,092	7.7	21.9	7.6	11.1	–	–	–	–	–	–	5.3	20.5	14.9	10.8
SocioMétrica/El Español	5–8 Mar 2019	1,600	11.5	19.6	11.4	12.9	2.5	1.1	0.9	2.7	1.1	0.1	9.2	14.5	8.5	6.7
GAD3/ABC	4–8 Mar 2019	1,000	12.0	25.2	7.8	9.3	2.6	0.7	1.2	–	0.6	–	10.0	–	–	13.2
GAD3/ABC	18–22 Feb 2019	800	13.5	23.5	7.1	10.2	2.5	0.7	0.5	–	0.6	–	9.3	–	–	10.0
SocioMétrica/El Español	13–15 Feb 2019	1,000	10.7	15.0	10.8	13.3	1.3	0.6	0.7	2.2	0.5	0.2	9.3	18.1	12.1	1.7
GESOP/El Periódico	13–15 Feb 2019	1,000	11.5	21.3	7.8	9.5	4.4	0.6	–	–	–	–	8.8	25.1	5.6	9.8
GAD3/La Vanguardia	12–15 Feb 2019	1,200	12.1	23.2	7.2	12.6	2.3	0.7	1.1	–	0.7	0.4	5.7	–	–	11.1
Metroscopia/Henneo	11–13 Feb 2019	1,995	11.0	20.1	8.1	11.0	–	–	–	–	–	–	8.0	30.2		9.1
CIS	1–10 Feb 2019	2,964	12.1	24.1	10.4	11.1	2.4	0.5	0.6	1.8	0.7	0.1	4.3	17.2	10.3	12.0
Simple Lógica	1–8 Feb 2019	1,017	8.9	18.6	7.8	12.1	–	–	–	–	–	–	6.6	18.9	17.9	6.5
GAD3/ABC	14–24 Dec 2018	1,800	16.2	20.1	7.0	10.3	2.3	0.9	0.7	–	0.6	–	7.5	–	–	3.9
Metroscopia/Henneo	9–15 Jan 2019	2,332	11.1	15.2	11.3	12.1	–	–	–	–	–	–	7.9	32.6		3.1
CIS	1–13 Jan 2019	2,989	10.2	20.5	10.5	12.1	3.2	0.7	0.9	1.1	0.8	0.1	4.5	20.7	10.7	8.4
Simple Lógica	3–9 Jan 2019	1,042	9.2	16.3	7.9	11.5	–	–	–	–	–	–	7.0	19.9	19.4	4.8
SocioMétrica/El Español	22 Dec–5 Jan 2019	2,200	11.4	15.0	13.2	14.9	1.0	0.4	0.5	2.1	0.7	0.2	10.0	16.5	9.2	0.1
GAD3/ABC	10–14 Dec 2018	1,005	13.6	20.5	8.2	17.2	2.4	1.2	0.7	–	0.4	–	7.0	–	–	3.3
Simple Lógica	3–14 Dec 2018	1,204	9.1	16.9	10.1	12.9	–	–	–	–	–	–	4.6	20.0	19.9	4.0
Metroscopia/Henneo	10–12 Dec 2018	1,895	9.1	17.0	12.6	13.9	–	–	–	–	–	–	7.5	26.9		3.1
CIS	1–12 Dec 2018	2,984	14.1	21.3	11.0	13.2	3.5	1.0	1.2	0.9	0.8	–	2.7	16.9	9.0	7.2
Simple Lógica	2–14 Nov 2018	1,019	7.4	15.3	11.4	13.4	–	–	–	–	–	–	–	20.6	21.1	1.9
CIS	1–11 Nov 2018	2,974	11.5	19.4	11.0	11.4	3.2	0.5	0.4	1.4	0.7	0.2	1.7	21.5	11.4	7.9
GAD3/La Vanguardia	2–7 Nov 2018	1,208	13.2	23.5	9.6	18.0	1.9	0.6	1.0	–	0.2	0.1	–	–	–	5.5
GESOP/El Periódico	22–30 Oct 2018	911	11.4	19.7	12.9	14.1	3.2	0.6	1.0	0.8	1.0	0.2	3.1	19.2	7.0	5.6
Metroscopia/Henneo	16–18 Oct 2018	1,588	12.2	17.8	10.9	12.8	–	–	–	–	–	–	3.2	–	–	5.0
CIS	1–9 Oct 2018	2,973	12.6	21.7	12.1	15.3	3.0	1.0	0.7	1.2	0.6	0.1	1.0	15.6	10.3	6.4
Simple Lógica	1–5 Oct 2018	1,055	10.8	15.3	9.7	12.7	–	–	–	–	–	–	–	22.3	21.0	2.6
DYM/El Independiente	17–19 Sep 2018	1,017	11.1	15.2	10.0	14.3	–	–	–	–	–	–	–	23.4	9.5	0.9
Metroscopia/Henneo	17–19 Sep 2018	1,095	11.5	19.9	9.8	13.2	–	–	–	–	–	–	–	–	–	6.7
IMOP/El Confidencial	6–11 Sep 2018	1,012	12.9	23.4	14.3	22.7	–	–	–	–	–	–	2.6	–	–	0.7
CIS	1–11 Sep 2018	2,972	12.9	18.6	9.8	12.3	2.6	1.1	0.6	0.9	0.7	0.1	0.9	22.7	11.7	5.7
Simple Lógica	3–7 Sep 2018	1,029	9.8	16.0	10.5	13.7	–	–	–	–	–	–	–	20.1	19.7	2.3
SocioMétrica/El Español	22–30 Aug 2018	1,200	12.5	16.8	12.1	16.7	2.1	1.0	0.8	1.4	0.5	0.6	1.2	19.8	11.3	0.1
Simple Lógica	1–3 Aug 2018	1,029	10.2	14.8	8.3	13.2	–	–	–	–	–	–	–	21.7	24.0	1.6
GAD3/ABC	24–26 Jul 2018	804	14.8	20.7	7.6	16.2	2.9	0.9	0.3	–	0.5	0.1	–	–	–	4.5
Metroscopia/Henneo	16–25 Jul 2018	2,260	15.6	17.3	11.6	12.6	–	–	–	–	–	–	–	–	–	1.7
CIS	1–10 Jul 2018	2,485	10.2	23.9	8.9	11.3	3.1	0.6	0.7	1.4	0.9	0.1	0.5	19.9	13.9	12.6
Simple Lógica	2–6 Jul 2018	1,048	8.4	17.1	9.3	14.9	–	–	–	–	–	–	–	21.9	21.5	2.2
SocioMétrica/El Español	19–22 Jun 2018	1,700	13.8	17.9	12.9	19.7	2.1	1.0	0.7	1.1	0.5	0.8	1.5	13.6	9.6	1.8
GESOP/El Periódico	11–13 Jun 2018	800	10.3	22.3	11.4	17.1	2.4	1.6	1.5	–	0.9	–	–	17.2	6.1	5.2
DYM/El Independiente	11–12 Jun 2018	1,019	11.1	18.7	10.6	13.8	–	–	–	–	–	–	–	23.6	8.8	4.9
GAD3/ABC	7–8 Jun 2018	800	17.2	19.7	7.3	17.8	2.8	0.8	0.5	–	0.5	0.4	–	–	–	1.9
Simple Lógica	4–8 Jun 2018	1,030	9.7	16.0	11.0	15.8	–	–	–	–	–	–	–	23.1	16.6	0.2
IMOP/El Confidencial	23–28 May 2018	1,015	12.2	18.7	20.4	26.4	–	–	–	–	–	–	1.0	22.3		6.0
SocioMétrica/El Español	17–26 May 2018	1,700	13.3	14.9	14.7	22.2	2.8	1.1	1.4	1.1	1.0	0.9	1.4	9.2	8.8	7.3
Simple Lógica	3–10 May 2018	1,067	8.9	11.1	11.7	17.7	–	–	–	–	–	–	–	21.4	21.3	6.0
Metroscopia/El País	7–9 May 2018	1,726	9.6	11.4	13.1	19.3	–	–	–	–	–	–	–	–	–	6.2
GESOP/El Periódico	12–18 Apr 2018	1,000	14.1	16.9	14.2	22.7	3.3	2.3	–	–	–	–	–	10.4	5.2	5.8
CIS	1–10 Apr 2018	2,466	12.1	13.5	11.3	16.1	3.2	1.2	0.7	1.2	0.6	0.0	–	21.3	12.9	2.6
Simple Lógica	2–9 Apr 2018	1,062	8.4	11.0	10.9	19.0	–	–	–	–	–	–	–	21.3	20.9	8.0
Metroscopia/El País	4–5 Apr 2018	1,278	10.7	12.5	11.3	17.6	–	–	–	–	–	–	–	–	–	5.1
MyWord/Cadena SER	13–16 Mar 2018	1,002	7.9	8.7	14.5	20.2	5.3	1.6	0.8	3.5	0.3	0.3	1.1	21.8	5.0	5.7
GAD3/La Vanguardia	12–14 Mar 2018	1,008	16.0	17.5	14.1	24.6	2.3	1.1	1.5	–	0.5	0.3	–	–	–	7.1
Simple Lógica	1–7 Mar 2018	1,076	9.9	12.1	10.4	19.5	–	–	–	–	–	–	–	16.9	21.9	7.4
Metroscopia/El País	2–5 Mar 2018	1,175	12.6	11.2	11.9	20.0	–	–	–	–	–	–	–	25.6		7.4
IMOP/El Confidencial	22–27 Feb 2018	1,402	12.5	16.6	15.7	26.6	–	–	–	–	–	–	0.6	28.6		10.0
MyWord/Cadena SER	7–14 Feb 2018	1,000	7.9	10.4	15.5	19.5	4.7	1.3	0.8	2.3	0.6	0.1	–	20.6	7.7	4.0
Metroscopia/El País	5–8 Feb 2018	1,321	12.9	12.8	13.3	26.0	–	–	–	–	–	–	–	25.6		12.7
Simple Lógica	1–7 Feb 2018	1,065	9.8	11.1	9.7	19.1	–	–	–	–	–	–	–	23.4	20.6	8.0
CIS	2–14 Jan 2018	2,477	15.5	15.9	10.6	15.7	3.6	1.4	0.9	0.8	0.7	0.2	–	19.2	11.3	0.2
Metroscopia/El País	9–11 Jan 2018	1,332	13.2	16.2	12.2	21.7	–	–	–	–	–	–	–	24.9		5.5
Simple Lógica	2–8 Jan 2018	1,079	10.6	12.6	8.9	16.7	–	–	–	–	–	–	–	23.4	20.1	4.1
SocioMétrica/El Español	22–29 Dec 2017	1,000	17.8	15.1	10.9	20.1	2.8	1.4	0.7	0.7	0.5	0.4	1.0	10.2	14.3	2.3
Simple Lógica	5–13 Dec 2017	1,071	13.0	13.6	8.8	16.5	–	–	–	–	–	–	–	20.8	18.6	2.9
Metroscopia/El País	6–8 Nov 2017	1,730	17.5	18.4	11.3	18.8	–	–	–	–	–	–	–	23.6		0.4
Simple Lógica	2–8 Nov 2017	1,071	13.8	14.8	9.3	17.3	–	–	–	–	–	–	–	18.7	18.8	2.5
CIS	2–11 Oct 2017	2,487	16.5	16.2	11.0	11.3	2.0	0.9	0.9	0.9	0.7	0.3	–	21.5	11.8	0.3
DYM/El Confidencial	26 Sep–11 Oct 2017	982	10.5	12.6	10.4	8.0	–	–	–	–	–	–	–	51.8		2.1
Simple Lógica	2–10 Oct 2017	1,053	13.1	12.8	11.2	13.4	–	–	–	–	–	–	–	20.8	21.1	0.3
Simple Lógica	5–14 Sep 2017	1,078	16.2	15.3	12.4	9.7	–	–	–	–	–	–	–	17.9	21.9	0.9
GAD3/ABC	4–8 Sep 2017	1,000	18.5	15.2	12.8	10.6	2.3	0.7	1.1	–	0.2	0.1	–	–	–	3.3
MyWord/Cadena SER	4–7 Sep 2017	1,003	14.8	15.1	15.0	11.0	4.8	1.2	0.4	3.5	0.2	0.1	–	19.5	4.5	0.1
Metroscopia/El País	14–18 Jul 2017	1,700	18.4	16.1	14.9	13.6	–	–	–	–	–	–	–	27.2		2.3
MyWord/Cadena SER	7–12 Jul 2017	1,003	12.4	10.4	17.0	11.9	4.2	1.2	0.6	3.5	0.4	0.8	–	21.3	4.8	4.6
Simple Lógica	3–10 Jul 2017	1,003	12.8	14.8	14.4	11.8	–	–	–	–	–	–	–	18.0	20.5	0.4
CIS	1–10 Jul 2017	2,490	17.1	19.1	14.2	9.2	2.6	0.5	0.9	1.0	0.7	0.2	–	17.1	12.3	2.0
Metroscopia/El País	27–28 Jun 2017	1,017	17.2	15.7	17.7	15.3	–	–	–	–	–	–	–	23.4		0.5
DYM/El Confidencial	22–28 Jun 2017	1,219	12.4	15.3	12.3	–	–	–	–	–	–	–	–	–	–	2.9
Simple Lógica	5–9 Jun 2017	1,004	15.2	15.3	12.0	11.7	–	–	–	–	–	–	–	17.5	21.5	0.1
MyWord/Cadena SER	30 May–1 Jun 2017	1,008	11.1	14.8	17.9	14.6	4.9	1.0	1.3	2.8	0.9	0.2	–	15.5	6.9	3.1
Metroscopia/El País	29 May–1 Jun 2017	1,768	16.4	17.1	16.2	14.7	–	–	–	–	–	–	–	24.5		0.7
Simple Lógica	3–12 May 2017	1,002	14.8	13.6	15.2	9.7	–	–	–	–	–	–	–	17.5	21.8	0.4
SocioMétrica/El Español	5–12 Apr 2017	800	20.5	14.6	14.4	12.1	2.0	1.5	0.8	–	0.8	0.4	–	16.7	15.4	5.9
Simple Lógica	3–10 Apr 2017	1,008	15.4	14.1	12.9	10.4	–	–	–	–	–	–	–	17.8	21.3	1.3
CIS	1–8 Apr 2017	2,492	18.5	13.4	14.1	9.2	2.3	1.2	0.7	0.9	1.2	0.3	–	20.0	13.6	4.4
Metroscopia/El País	30 Mar–6 Apr 2017	3,166	20.2	12.6	17.3	13.6	–	–	–	–	–	–	–	24.2		2.9
MyWord/Cadena SER	21–26 Mar 2017	1,055	12.4	10.0	19.1	12.3	4.5	1.3	0.7	3.5	0.4	–	–	19.0	6.9	6.7
Metroscopia/El País	6–9 Mar 2017	1,230	20.2	12.7	17.9	14.0	–	–	–	–	–	–	–	23.9		2.3
Simple Lógica	1–9 Mar 2017	1,006	16.3	12.0	13.2	9.0	–	–	–	–	–	–	–	17.1	23.8	3.1
GESOP/El Periódico	19–22 Feb 2017	1,000	17.0	13.2	19.0	8.2	2.7	0.8	0.9	–	0.7	–	–	23.5	8.5	2.0
Simple Lógica	6–10 Feb 2017	1,005	16.8	13.0	14.4	7.8	–	–	–	–	–	–	–	16.3	24.7	2.4
MyWord/Cadena SER	31 Jan–6 Feb 2017	1,000	14.4	9.5	20.5	10.9	3.9	0.7	0.7	3.2	0.6	0.1	–	18.7	7.3	6.1
Metroscopia/El País	10–12 Jan 2017	1,578	19.2	12.8	18.4	12.3	–	–	–	–	–	–	–	27.6		0.8
CIS	2–12 Jan 2017	2,490	20.7	12.7	15.0	8.0	2.5	1.0	1.0	0.8	0.8	0.1	–	18.1	14.5	5.7
Simple Lógica	1–7 Dec 2016	1,000	16.1	12.1	14.8	10.1	–	–	–	–	–	–	–	18.0	22.4	1.3
Metroscopia/El País	23–30 Nov 2016	2,650	21.5	12.3	19.1	11.3	–	–	–	–	–	–	–	25.3		2.4
MyWord/Cadena SER	17–22 Nov 2016	1,000	16.3	8.3	23.2	10.6	3.8	0.9	1.0	3.8	0.5	0.1	–	13.0	8.1	6.9
Metroscopia/El País	7–11 Nov 2016	1,302	23.1	13.5	20.5	13.1	–	–	–	–	–	–	–	20.6		2.6
Simple Lógica	2–8 Nov 2016	1,003	19.1	9.4	16.2	8.9	–	–	–	–	–	–	–	17.0	23.4	2.9
Simple Lógica	3–11 Oct 2016	1,002	16.7	9.7	16.5	8.2	–	–	–	–	–	–	–	18.1	24.0	0.2
CIS	1–10 Oct 2016	2,491	19.6	12.3	15.8	8.2	2.4	0.8	0.9	1.1	0.5	0.2	–	19.5	14.5	3.8
DYM/El Confidencial	27 Sep–6 Oct 2016	1,132	15.9	7.1	17.2	7.1	–	–	–	–	–	–	–	15.2	15.6	1.3
SocioMétrica/El Español	26–30 Sep 2016	1,000	20.4	13.3	12.5	8.5	2.6	1.2	1.4	–	0.6	0.4	–	5.8	29.1	7.1
MyWord/Cadena SER	9–14 Sep 2016	995	17.3	10.4	20.6	10.9	3.8	1.1	0.9	2.7	0.4	0.1	–	15.4	10.2	3.3
Simple Lógica	1–14 Sep 2016	1,046	16.8	15.1	13.3	8.7	–	–	–	–	–	–	–	17.6	22.7	1.7
Simple Lógica	1–10 Aug 2016	1,049	19.0	12.4	13.6	7.5	–	–	–	–	–	–	–	19.0	23.1	6.4
Simple Lógica	1–15 Jul 2016	1,033	16.1	14.3	16.0	8.4	–	–	–	–	–	–	–	16.8	22.2	0.1
CIS	1–11 Jul 2016	2,479	19.4	16.7	15.9	8.1	2.3	0.9	1.0	1.3	0.7	0.0	–	15.8	13.4	2.7
2016 general election	26 Jun 2016	—N/a	22.9	15.7	14.6	9.0	1.8	1.4	0.8	0.8	0.5	0.2	0.1	—N/a	30.2	7.2

==== Victory preferences ====
The table below lists opinion polling on the victory preferences for each party in the event of a general election taking place.

Polling firm/Commissioner	Fieldwork date	Sample size	PP	PSOE	Unidas Podemos	Cs	Vox	Other/ None	Question	Lead
Metroscopia/Henneo	18–25 Mar 2019	2,722	15.0	31.0	11.0	16.0	7.0	10.0	10.0	15.0
CIS	1–18 Mar 2019	16,194	12.4	29.2	9.9	11.8	3.9	12.8	20.0	16.8
GAD3/La Vanguardia	12–15 Feb 2019	1,200	15.7	28.4	8.2	15.2	5.0	10.6	16.9	12.7
GAD3/La Vanguardia	2–7 Nov 2018	1,208	17.1	27.4	9.8	19.2	–	17.5	9.0	8.2
Metroscopia/Henneo	16–25 Jul 2018	2,260	18.0	29.0	13.0	18.0	–	22.0		11.0
GAD3/La Vanguardia	12–14 Mar 2018	1,008	13.7	18.0	14.5	27.6	–	13.3	12.9	9.6

==== Victory likelihood ====
The table below lists opinion polling on the perceived likelihood of victory for each party in the event of a general election taking place.

Polling firm/Commissioner	Fieldwork date	Sample size	PP	PSOE	Unidas Podemos	Cs	Vox	Other/ None	Question	Lead
Metroscopia/Henneo	11–16 Apr 2019	4,775	13.0	59.0	1.0	3.0	2.0	–	–	46.0
GAD3/La Vanguardia	9–11 Apr 2019	1,800	15.6	54.5	1.2	3.4	3.0	0.9	21.4	38.9
Metroscopia/Henneo	18–25 Mar 2019	2,722	19.0	48.0	1.0	6.0	3.0	2.0	21.0	29.0
IMOP/El Confidencial	17–23 Mar 2019	1,399	18.1	42.4	–	3.8	–	–	–	24.3
CIS	1–18 Mar 2019	16,194	20.9	40.8	0.5	3.9	1.3	2.6	30.0	19.9
GAD3/ABC	14–24 Jan 2019	1,800	39.2	28.2	1.0	6.9	3.6	0.7	20.4	11.0
Metroscopia/Henneo	16–25 Jul 2018	2,260	35.0	29.0	1.0	15.0	–	20.0		6.0
GESOP/El Periódico	12–18 Apr 2018	1,000	45.7	6.2	1.1	30.6	–	16.4		17.1

==== Senate projections ====
Polling firm/Commissioner	Fieldwork date	Sample size	PP	PSOE	Unidas Podemos	Cs	ERC	PDeCAT	PNV	EH Bildu	CCa	Vox	ASG	NA+
April 2019 general election	28 Apr 2019	—N/a	54	123	0	4	11	2	9	1	0	0	1	3
Sigma Dos/El Mundo	3–17 Apr 2019	8,000	48	136	0	0	9	–	7	–	–	0	–	–
Sigma Dos/El Mundo	19–22 Feb 2019	1,200	57	125	0	0	12	–	7	–	–	0	–	–
SocioMétrica/El Español	13–15 Feb 2019	1,000	123	56	7		12	2	6	0	1	1	–	–
SocioMétrica/El Español	13–15 Feb 2019	1,000	75	97	7	5	12	2	6	0	1	3	–	–
SocioMétrica/El Español	22 Dec–5 Jan 2019	2,200	61	86	14	20	11	2	5	1	0	8	–	–
2016 general election	26 Jun 2016	—N/a	130	43	16	0	10	2	5	0	1	0	1	–

=== Hypothetical scenarios ===
==== Podemos & IU ====
Polling firm/Commissioner	Fieldwork date	Sample size	Turnout	PP	PSOE	Podemos	Cs	IU	Lead
DYM/El Confidencial	22–28 Jun 2017	1,219	?	30.9	25.0	12.8	15.8	4.7	5.9

==== PP candidates ====
Polling firm/Commissioner	Fieldwork date	Sample size	Turnout	PP (Pablo Casado)	PP (Soraya Sáenz de Santamaría)	PSOE	Unidos Podemos	Cs	ERC	Vox	Lead
Top Position/Merca2	10–11 Jul 2018	1,200	?	–	21.4	23.6	17.1	21.6	3.5	3.7	2.0
Top Position/Merca2	10–11 Jul 2018	1,200	?	23.5	–	23.8	17.1	22.1	3.5	1.8	0.3

==== 1977 parties ====
Polling firm/Commissioner	Fieldwork date	Sample size	Turnout	AP	PSOE	UCD	PCE	ERC	CiU	PNV	Lead
NC Report/La Razón	15 Jun 2017	?	?	33.4; 138/142	24.3; 90/93	17.6; 52/55	14.5; 40/44	2.8; 10	1.6; 6	1.1; 6	9.1

==== PSOE candidates ====
Polling firm/Commissioner	Fieldwork date	Sample size	Turnout	PP	PSOE (Susana Díaz)	PSOE (Pedro Sánchez)	PSOE (Patxi López)	Unidos Podemos	Cs	ERC	PDeCAT	PNV	Lead
Sigma Dos/El Mundo	8–10 May 2017	1,200	?	29.3	–	–	27.4	20.4	13.2	2.4	1.0	1.1	1.9
Sigma Dos/El Mundo	8–10 May 2017	1,200	?	29.9	–	28.2	–	18.6	13.6	2.4	1.0	1.2	1.7
Sigma Dos/El Mundo	8–10 May 2017	1,200	?	29.4	24.7	–	–	22.4	13.8	2.5	1.0	1.2	4.7
DYM/El Confidencial	7–15 Mar 2017	1,010	?	29.8	–	–	25.2	19.8	13.6	–	–	–	4.6
DYM/El Confidencial	7–15 Mar 2017	1,010	?	29.9	–	24.5	–	17.8	16.0	–	–	–	5.4
DYM/El Confidencial	7–15 Mar 2017	1,010	?	29.7	18.9	–	–	24.2	15.4	–	–	–	5.5

==== Aznar's party ====
Polling firm/Commissioner	Fieldwork date	Sample size	Turnout	PP	PSOE	Unidos Podemos	C's	ERC	PDeCAT	PNV	EH Bildu	CC	Aznar's party	Lead
SocioMétrica/El Español	22–29 Dec 2016	800	?	24.0; 102	19.0; 73	21.0; 74	12.0; 25	? 11	? 5	? 6	? 2	? 1	15.0; 51	3.0
