= Susan J. Devlin =

American statistician

Susan J. Devlin is an American statistician who has contributed to highly-cited research on robust statistics and local regression.

== Education and career ==
Devlin earned a bachelor's degree in mathematics from William Smith College in 1968, and has a master's degree in statistics from Rutgers University.

After completing her bachelor's degree, she began working for Bell Labs, and completed her master's degree on a part-time basis while working there. After the 1984 breakup of the Bell system, she moved to Bellcore, and in 1987 her responsibilities at Bellcore shifted from research in statistics to its application in modeling client satisfaction with Bellcore's services. In 1997, she retired from Bellcore and became a founding principal of The Artemis Group, a New Jersey–based marketing consulting firm.

After moving to Thomaston, Maine she became president of the Thomaston Historical Society.

== Service ==
Devlin chaired the Committee on Women in Statistics (CoWiS) of the American Statistical Association for 1984–1985. She was chair of the Statistical Consulting Section of the American Statistical Association for 2005.

== Recognition ==
Devlin became a Fellow of the American Statistical Association in 2005.
