= Èlizbar Nadaraya =

Georgian mathematician who developed a kernel regression method

Èlizbar Nadaraya is a Georgian mathematician who is currently a Full Professor and the Chair of the Theory of Probability and Mathematical Statistics at the Tbilisi State University. He developed the Nadaraya-Watson estimator along with Geoffrey Watson, which proposes estimating the conditional expectation of a random variable as a locally weighted average using a kernel as a weighting function.

Nadaraya was born in 1936 in Khobi, Georgia. He received his doctoral degree from the V.I. Romanovski Institute of Mathematics, Tashkent in 1981. He has since co-authored over 120 publications including 5 textbooks in the area of probability and statistics.

== Most cited publications ==
=== Book ===
- E. A. Nadaraya, Nonparametric Estimation of Probability Densities and Regression Curves Springer, 1989 Nonparametric Estimation of Probability Densities and Regression Curves ISBN 978-90-277-2757-2 (Cited 319 times, according to Google Scholar.)

=== Journal articles ===
- Nadaraya EA. On estimating regression. Theory of Probability & Its Applications. 1964;9(1):141-2. (Cited 4408 times, according to Google Scholar)
- Nadaraya, E.A., 1965. On non-parametric estimates of density functions and regression curves. Theory of Probability & Its Applications, 10(1), pp. 186–190. (Cited 673 times, according to Google Scholar.)
- Nadaraya EA. Some new estimates for distribution functions. Theory of Probability & Its Applications. 1964;9(3):497-500. (Cited 329 times, according to Google Scholar.)
