= Garriga (surname) =

Garriga is a Spanish surname. Notable people with the surname include:

- Andreu Garriga (1843–1915), Catalan-American Roman Catholic priest, poet, and writer
- Charlie Garriga, American guitarist
- Eduardo Mendoza Garriga (born 1943), Spanish novelist, playwright, and essayist
- Elisabet Sadó Garriga (born 1981), former professional squash player
- Enric Garriga i Trullols (1926–2011), Spanish Catalan independentist and activist for the Occitan Nation
- Gerard Gumbau Garriga (born 1994), Spanish footballer
- Gerard Garriga (born 1993), Spanish footballer
- Ignacio Garriga (born 1987), Spanish politician as well as a former dentist and professor
- Joan Garriga Bacardí (born 1957), Gestalt and humanistic psychologist and psychotherapist
- Joan Garriga Doménech (born 1973), Catalan politician
- Joan Garriga (1963–2015), Spanish Grand Prix motorcycle road racer
- Juan Garriga (born 1940), Spanish alpine skier
- Jaume Agelet i Garriga (1888–1981), Catalan poet
- Jaume Aragall y Garriga (born 1939), Spanish operatic tenor
- Joaquín Lluch y Garriga (1816–1882), Spanish prelate of the Catholic Church
- Jordi Cervelló i Garriga (1935–2022), Catalan composer
- José Garriga Picó (born 1948), Puerto Rican politician
- Josep Grau-Garriga (1929–2011), Catalan textile artist
- Josep Sunyol i Garriga (1898–1936), Catalan lawyer, journalist, and politician
- Josep Raich Garriga (1913–1988), Spanish footballer
- Joseph Napoléon Sébastien Sarda Garriga (1808–1877), French abolitionist
- Luis María Garriga (born 1945), Spanish athlete
- María Libertad Gómez Garriga (1889–1961), Puerto Rican educator, community leader, and politician
- Mariano Simon Garriga (1886–1965), American prelate of the Roman Catholic Church
- Mariela Garriga (born 1989), Cuban actress
- Manuel Garriga (1926–1980), French footballer
- Manuel Garriga (1928–2019), Spanish footballer
- Montserrat Garriga Cabrero (1865–1956), Cuban-Spanish botanist
- Neus Garriga (born 1978), Spanish former sailor
- Olga Viscal Garriga (1929–1995), public orator and political activist
- Pere Tena Garriga (1928–2014), Catalan bishop and a specialist in liturgical pastoral care
- Salvador Garriga Polledo (born 1957), Spanish politician
