= José Antonio Ortega Lara =

Spanish far right politician

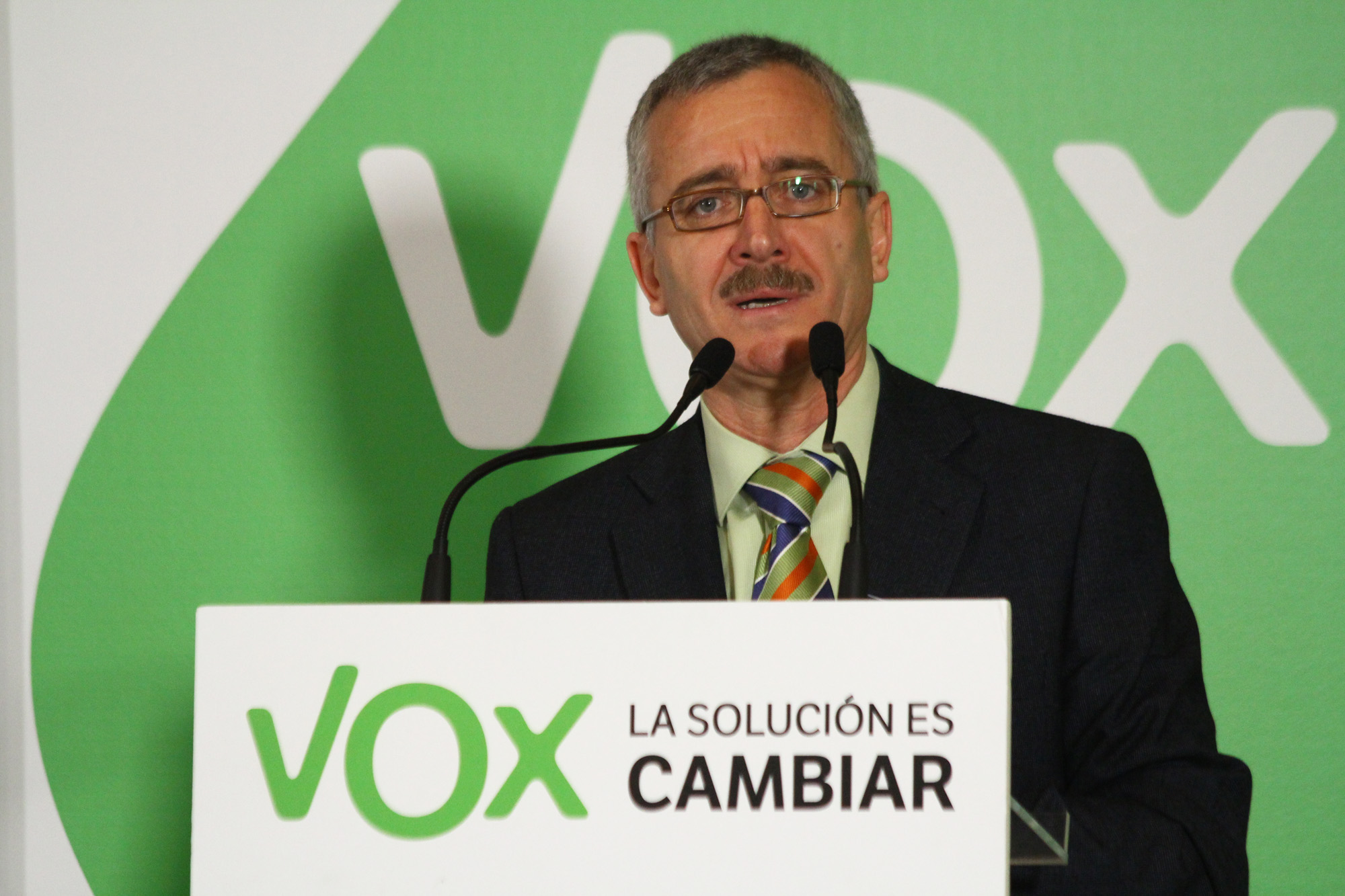
José Antonio Ortega Lara in 2014

José Antonio Ortega Lara (born 1958 in Montuenga es, parish of Madrigalejo del Monte, Burgos) is a retired Spanish prison officer who was held hostage by the Basque separatist organization ETA for 532 days between 1996 and 1997. He is a teacher and holds a law degree. He was a member of the People's Party between 1987 and 2008. He currently lives in Burgos. On January 16, 2014, he presented the political party Vox as a member of the Provisional Executive Committee, together with other former members of the People's Party.

== Kidnapping ==
On January 17, 1996, José Antonio Ortega Lara was kidnapped in the garage of his home in Burgos when he was returning from his work in the prison of Logroño. Days later, ETA said they were responsible for the kidnapping and demanded the transfer of ETA prisoners to Basque prisons in exchange for his release.

The conditions of his kidnapping were painful: the dungeon in which he was kept was very wet (it was a few meters from the river Deva), there were no windows and it measured 3 meters long by 2.5 wide and 1.8 m high inside. Ortega Lara could only take three steps in it. He had a small light bulb and he was only fed with fruits and vegetables. He could not leave the cabin and for sanitation had only a urinal, from which he collected water to wash himself. At the time of his rescue by Spanish police, Ortega Lara had lost 23 kilos, muscle mass and bone density. He suffered from sleep disorders, post-traumatic stress, anxiety and depression.

In October 2005 ETA leaders Julian Achurra Egurola ("Pototo") and José Luis Aguirre Lete ("Isuntza") were put on trial for being the organizers of the kidnapping. According to the sentence, Erostegui José Luis Javier Ugarte, Josu Uribetxeberria Bolinaga and José Miguel Gaztelu Ochandorena were asked by "Pototo" to seek information for selecting a victim to kidnapping. They also ordered the preparation and maintenance of a hovel where they had to hold the victim, so they built an enclosure of 3.5 square meters in Mondragon.

== After the kidnapping ==
On the recommendation of doctors and his family, José Antonio Ortega Lara took early retirement in 1997, one of the options offered to him by the Ministry of the Interior, as a victim of terrorism.

In the municipal elections of 2003, Ortega Lara agreed to be one of the candidates on the list of People's Party (which he had been a member of since 1987) in the campaign for mayor of Burgos, led by Juan Carlos Aparicio, in solidarity with the Basque councilors threatened by ETA. His presence was symbolic (he was in the penultimate position of the candidature) so he was not elected.

In 2007 he gave his first interview after his abduction. In a TV program hosted by Fernando Sánchez Drago on Telemadrid, he declared himself completely against the negotiation process undertaken by the government of José Luis Rodríguez Zapatero with ETA (see ETA's 2006 ceasefire declaration). During the crisis of the People's Party after the general election of 2008, on May 22, he announced his resignation from the party due to ideological differences.

=== New political party ===
In January 2014 the launch of a new national-conservative party, Vox, was announced. Ortega Lara founded the party together with (among others) Santiago Abascal Conde, José Luis González Quirós and Ignacio Camuñas, creating an alternative to the People's Party. In 2018, Vox had a surprisingly strong showing in the Andalusian elections and received 11% of the votes, as well as 24 deputies in the 2019 general election.

== See also ==
- List of kidnappings
- List of solved missing person cases
