= Joan Garriga =

Joan Garriga may refer to:

- Joan Garriga (motorcyclist) (1963–2015), Spanish Grand Prix motorcycle road racer
- Joan Garriga Bacardí (born 1957), Gestalt and humanistic psychologist and psychotherapist
- Joan Garriga Doménech (born 1973), Catalan politician

== See also ==
- Juan Garriga (alpine skier) (born 1940), Spanish alpine skier
