= Rocío de Meer =

Spanish lawyer and politician (born 1989)

Rocío de Meer MP
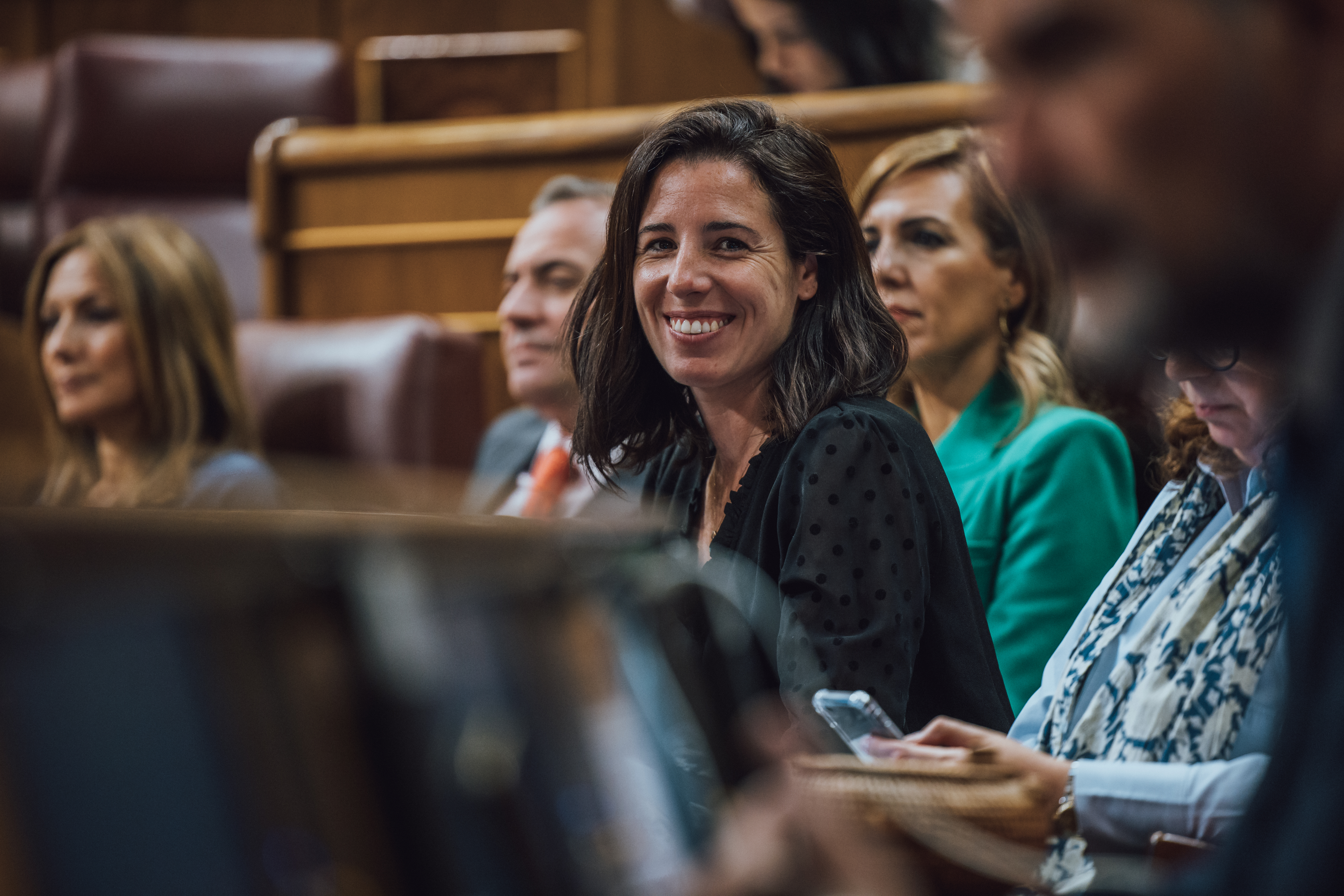

Member of the Congress of Deputies
- Incumbent
- Assumed office 21 May 2019
- Constituency: Almeria

Personal details
- Born: Rocío de Meer Méndez; 26 December 1989 (age 36) Madrid, Spain
- Party: Vox
- Children: 2
- Education: Complutense University of Madrid

Rocío de Meer Méndez (born 26 December 1989) is a Spanish lawyer and politician who has been a member of the Congress of Deputies since 2019 for Vox.

Méndez was born to a military family in Madrid. One of her grandparents was Colonel and politician Carlos de Meer de Ribera, the last Francoist civil governor of the Balearic Islands. She studied law at the Complutense University of Madrid where she became president of the university's debate society. During this time, she met and became friends with future Vox leader Santiago Abascal.

In the April 2019 elections she was elected as a deputy to the Congress of Deputies representing the Almeria constituency. She was re-elected in the subsequent election in November.
