= Santiago Abascal Escuza =

Spanish politician (1949–2017)

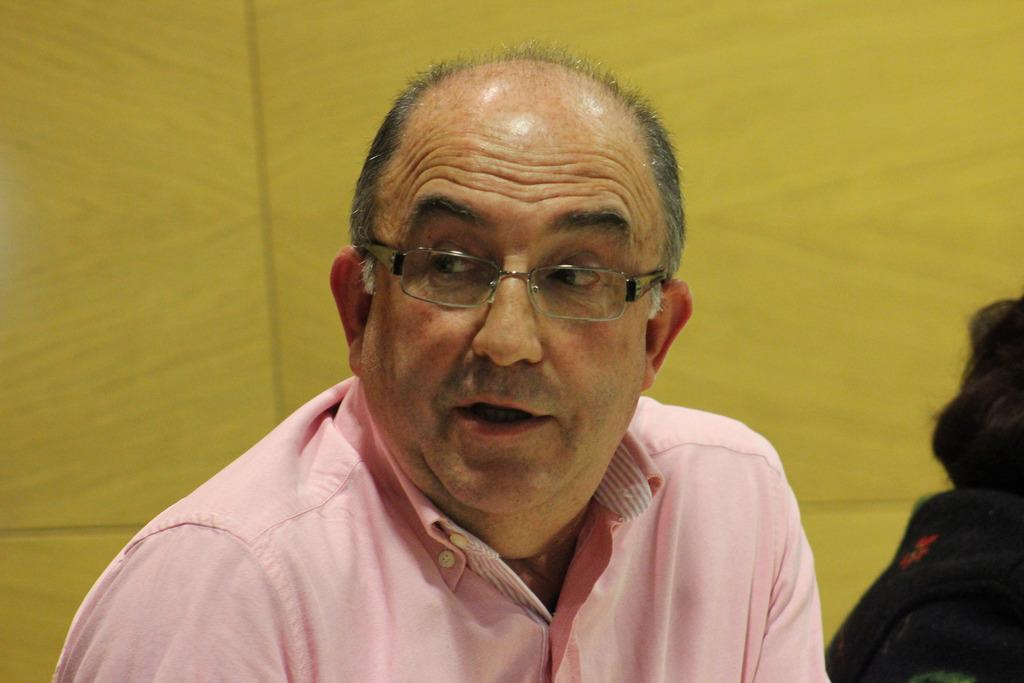

Santiago Abascal Escuza (30 October 1949 – 23 July 2017) was a Spanish politician.

== Biography ==
Abascal was born in Amurrio, Álava. His father, Manuel Abascal Pardo, was the town's mayor during the years of Francoist Spain. With his wife Isabel Conde Álvarez, he had three children. His son Santiago Abascal became the leader of Vox, while Abascal Escuza's wife, daughter and sister-in-law were all candidates for the party too.

During the Spanish transition to democracy, he joined the Spanish National Union (UNE) in 1976, which merged into the People's Alliance (AP) two years later, before becoming the People's Party (PP). He served in Amurrio Town Hall, the Juntas Generales de Álava, and in the Congress of Deputies from April 2003 to 2004. He was targeted by ETA for his political activities, facing arson, vandalism and assassination attempts; he was protected by the Civil Guard and state security.

In 2013, he was named in the Bárcenas affair. He admitted that he was given €12,000 by the PP in 1999, but could not remember who gave it to him.

Abascal later joined Vox, the party led by his son. He was their lead candidate in the 2016 Basque regional election and was hospitalised during the campaign in September, due to illness. He remained in hospital in Galdakao until his death on 23 July 2017, aged 67.
