= Garriga =

Garriga or Garrigas may refer to:

== Wine grapes ==
- Calitor
- Cayetana blanca

== People ==
- Garriga (surname)

== Places ==
- La Garriga, a municipality in the province of Barcelona
  - Bombing of La Garriga, a series of Nationalist air raids during the Spanish Civil War
- Grañena de las Garrigas, a village in the province of Lleida
- Garrigàs, a municipality in the comarca of Alt Empordà, Girona, Catalonia, Spain
