= Diezmo =

Compulsory ecclesiastical tithe

The diezmo was a compulsory ecclesiastical tithe collected in Spain and its empire from the Middle Ages until the reign of Isabel II in the mid-19th century.

== History ==
The obligatory tithe was introduced to the Iberian Peninsula in Aragón and Catalonia when they were frontier regions of the Carolingian Empire. It was a compulsory payment to the Catholic Church of one tenth of the fruits of agriculture or animal husbandry. There were two categories of tithes, one category for general products such as cereals, wine, oil, cattle, sheep, etc. and another category that included more specific assets such as poultry, vegetables, honey.

The taxes were paid to a "collector" and distributed among the parishes, abbots and bishops. To facilitate the process, neighbors could designate a dezmero who would physically transport the products from the households of the contributors.

In theory, at least, the diezmo was divided into three equal portions (tercios, "thirds"): one for the construction of churches, one to cover the costs of the clergy, and one to cover the needs of the abbeys, convents, and monasteries. In practice, the diezmo did not always retain its original purpose of subsidizing the Church. Feudal lords who were patrons of a monastery or church would gain the benefit of the tithe, or they might outright buy the right to the tithe from the Church, becoming, effectively, tax farmers.

Despite the name, the diezmo was not always exactly ten percent. The actual amount differed in different places and times. Nor was it extended to all products of agriculture and husbandry, which led to market distortions as farmers shifted to whatever was not taxed. The most efficacious measure against fraud was excommunication, which would remain in place until one's debt was paid.

In the Middle Ages, monarchs managed to participate in the benefit of the diezmo. Ferdinand III of Castile proposed to Pope Innocent IV the possibility that the royal treasury would receive the third of the diezmo destined for the construction of churches, in order to pay the costs of the siege of Seville. A share of two ninths was granted in 1247; Seville was captured in 1248. Once this first participation was agreed to, the royal share came and went for some years. Beginning in 1340, a portion of the diezmo was repeatedly assigned to the State, under the designation of tercias reales ("royal thirds"). This became permanent in 1494.

Philip II of Spain gained a new concession, el excusado ("the excused [portion]"), that reserved for the monarch the portion of the diezmo obtained by the leading dezmero in each parish. The reason invoked was Spain's wars against "infidels and "heretics".

The diezmo was greatly reduced during the Trienio liberal of 1821–1823 (a decree of 29 June 1821 cut it by half) but restored in full force by the absolutist government that followed. In 1837 the permanent Spanish diezmo was suppressed, although it was extended year by year in order to pay the costs of the First Carlist War. In 1841, the diezmo was abolished and a lesser tax to support religion and clergy was established.

== Spanish America ==
In the American portions of the Spanish Empire, the diezmo was collected directly by civil functionaries for the Crown, on the condition that they would erect, subsidize, and maintain churches. This tax constituted roughly ten percent of the Spanish Crown's income and was collected from owners of ranches and rural buildings. In general, the Indians who made up the vast majority of the population in colonial Spanish America were exempted from paying tithes on such native crops as maize and potatoes that they raised for their own subsistence. After some debate, Indians in colonial Spanish America were forced to pay tithes on their production of European agricultural products, including wheat, silk, cows, pigs, and sheep.

When various Latin American countries gained their independence from Spain in the 19th century, their governments took over the tax, which was considered an abuse by the Creole landowners. The tithe was abolished in several countries, including Mexico, soon after independence, around the time of the presidency of Santa Anna.

== Other Spanish taxes called diezmo ==
Unlike the English word tithe, the Spanish word diezmo can refer to the tenth part of anything. Consequently, the term diezmo—usually diezmo del rey ("king's tenth")—was applied to various tariffs as well as to the Church's tithe. The diezmo y media ("tenth and a half") or diezmo de lo morisco ("Moorish tenth") applied to trade with the Emirate of Granada. The diezmos de la mar ("tenths of the sea") applied to maritime trade between Galicia and northern Europe. The term was also applied at times to other taxes such as the diezmo de aceite ("tenth of oil").

== See also ==
- Beckham law
- Alcabala
- Capital gains tax
