= Taxation in Spain =

Taxes in Spain are levied by national (central), regional and local governments. Tax revenue in Spain stood at 36.3% of GDP in 2013. A wide range of taxes are levied on different sources, the most important ones being income tax, social security contributions, corporate tax, value added tax; some of them are applied at national level and others at national and regional levels. Most national and regional taxes are collected by the Agencia Estatal de Administración Tributaria which is the bureau responsible for collecting taxes at the national level. Other minor taxes like property transfer tax (regional), real estate property tax (local), road tax (local) are collected directly by regional or local administrations. Four historical territories or foral provinces (Araba/Álava, Bizkaia, Gipuzkoa and Navarre) collect all national and regional taxes themselves and subsequently transfer the portion due to the central Government after two negotiations called Concierto (in which the first three territories, that conform the Basque Autonomous Community, agree their defense jointly) and the Convenio (in which the territory and Community of Navarre defense itself alone). The tax year in Spain follows the calendar year. The tax collection method depends on the tax; some of them are collected by self-assessment, but others (i.e. income tax) follow a system of pay-as-you-earn tax with monthly withholdings that follow a self-assessment at the end of the term.

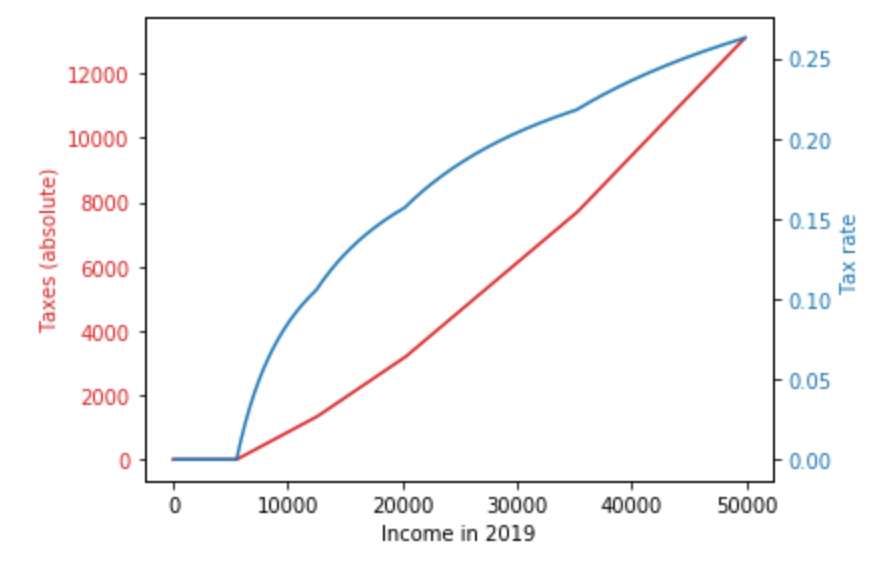
Tax rate in Spain for a Single

== Income tax ==
Personal income tax in Spain, known as IRPF, was introduced in 1900. It represents nearly 38% of government revenues. Since 2007, the responsibility for regulating and collecting personal income tax has been decentralized, the autonomous regions being responsible for collecting 50% of tax revenue (although all the returns and amounts are actually received by the central tax authority on their behalf). A single national rate applies per taxation band for the whole national portion of the income tax. Tax rates on the regional portion vary between regions, Madrid having the lowest and Catalonia the highest. Tax is withheld by the employer monthly on behalf of the tax authority. Tax returns are submitted between April and June of the following year and refunds are normally paid between May and July, however, the Government has until the end of the year to liquidate before the taxpayer has a right to interest for the outstanding money: any payments not paid by this date are paid with interest from the beginning of the next year.

As in other jurisdictions income tax is payable by both residents and non-residents with different rates applying. Individual residents are subject to personal income tax (IRPF) based on their income from around the globe. Non-residents are subject to IRPF only on their Spanish-sourced income. Residence status must be established when filing a Spanish tax return and has consequences for the amount of tax due. The rules are complex. Spain considers any alien to be resident if they were living in Spain for more than 183 days in the tax year. Sporadic periods of time outside of Spain are not counted towards establishing oneself as a non-resident for tax purposes. An alien is also considered a resident if s/he has a spouse or underage child who are residents, as well as any alien who has their main economic center in Spain. When there is a residence conflict double taxation agreement must be checked.

=== Allowances and deductions ===
Some amounts are subtracted from the income tax base before the rate is applied. Allowances are adjusted annually by law. Allowances vary depending on whether the income is from labor, the taxpayer is single or lives with elderly relatives or dependants, challenge conditions of the taxpayer or those they live with, the autonomous community where they live, and other issues. Also, the amount may be reduced by declaring income with your spouse if you are married and some expenditures (like contributions to unions, personal pension funds, etc.). The figures given below are valid for the year 2019.

The personal tax allowance differs depending on age. For the year 2019 under 65s, the personal tax allowance is €5,550. Individuals aged between 65 and 75 are allowed a €6,700 personal allowance. Anyone above 75 receives the highest personal allowance at €8,100.

There is an elderly relative allowance which lowers the taxable income and applies to those taxpayers who live with relatives older than 65 (or with relatives of any age with a disability graded at 33% or more) who do not have income themselves. This allowance is €1,150 if the relative is aged up to 75 and €2,550 above the age of 75.

There is also a dependants allowance which also lowers the taxable income base. It applies to taxpayers who live with dependants younger than 25 (or with dependants of any age with a disability graded at 33% or more). For the first dependent, the allowance is €2,400. The allowance for the second dependent is €2,700, the allowance for the third dependent is €4,000, and each further child has an allowance of €4,400. In addition to dependant allowances, there is a maternity allowance which is €1,200 for each child under the age of 3.

There are also other reductions and deductions applicable for expenditures and housing (home rental and purchasing). The exact amount of the deduction depends on the amount of the expenditure though it is topped.

Some autonomous communities (like Cantabria, Castilla-La Mancha and Madrid) have different allowances for their own share of the income tax and also establish their own deductions.

Retired expatriates living in Spain who receive an income within Spain for tax purposes and a pension from their native country will need to calculate their income tax and allowances by first identifying their marginal rate of income tax. This can be quite complex given the differing tax rates and thresholds within specific tax regions and variances in allowances.

=== Current rates ===
Once the gross income has been reduced by the legal allowances, reductions, and deductions, the taxpayer has to apply the rate to find out the actual tax.

As of January 1, 2015, the income tax has been reformed and simplified. It's important to note that these rates vary between regions. The rates shown below apply to the Community of Madrid. The communities of Andalusia and Catalonia apply a higher regional income tax than Madrid. The top rate of income tax in Andalusia and Catalonia is 49%.

From (euros)	Up to (euros)	Tax Rate	Step * Tax Rate
€0	€12,450	19%	€2,365.5
€12,450	€20,200	24%	€1,860
€20,200	€35,200	30%	€4,500
€35,200	€60,000	37%	€9,176
€60,000 and above		45%	

It's also noteworthy that these rates apply to the general income. Some kinds of income, like income bound to saving accounts, have different rates.

== Tax on investment income ==
1. Interest, coupon, bonds, insurance, and dividends are generally withheld at a 21% rate, but are added to the savings base and taxed at savings scale. The first €1,500 of dividends are exempt (since 2015 this exemption does not apply).
2. Long term (+1 year) capital gains on: stocks, investment funds, and real estate, are also taxed at savings scale.
3. Short-term (-1 year) capital gains are taxed at a general scale (24,75%-52%). Since 2015 short and long-term capital gains are taxed at a savings scale.

Savings scale 2014

* up to €6,000 : 21%
* from 6,000 to €24,000 : 25%
* over €24,000 : 27%

Savings scale 2015/2016

* up to €6,000 : 20%/19%
* from 6,000 to €50,000 : 22%/21%
* over €50,000 : 24%/23%

== Value added tax ==
VAT (IVA in Spanish: impuesto sobre el valor añadido or impuesto sobre el valor agregado) is due on any supply of goods or services sold in Spain (mainland Spain and Balearic Islands only). The current normal rate is 21% which applies to all goods which do not qualify for a reduced rate or are exempt. There are two lower rates of 10% and 4%. The 10% rate is payable on most drinks, hotel services, and cultural events. The 4% rate is payable on food, books and medicines. The Spanish African territories of Ceuta, Melilla and the Canary Islands have other taxes equivalent to the VAT, but with lower tax rates An EU directive means that all countries of the European Union have VAT. All exempt goods and services are listed below.

- Education provided by the state
- Tutoring
- Sporting services
- Cultural services
- Insurance
- Postal stamps
- Artists, writers, and composers

As of January 1, 2013, new properties are taxed at a reduced rate of 10%. Second-hand properties are not subject to VAT, but a transfer tax, known as Impuestos Sobre Transmisiones Patrimoniales or ITP. The tax is levied by the autonomous regional governments and therefore varies by region. The rate varies from 6% to 8%.

== Corporate tax ==
As of January 1, 2015, the corporate tax rate was 28% (further reduced to 25% in 2016). There is a lower tax rate for newly formed companies. The rate, which was introduced in 2015, is set at 15% for the first 2 years in which the company obtains taxable profit.

In the Canary Islands, corporate income tax is reduced to 4% for corporate entities with registered address within the Canarian archipelago (and with at least one member of the company’s administration residing permanently in the Canaries), as part of the Canary Islands Special Zone (ZEC) within the framework of the Economic and Fiscal Regime of the Canary Islands (REF) and as authorised by the European Commission in 2000.

== Spanish property tax for non-residents ==
Property owners are considered a non-resident in Spain if they live in the country for less than 183 days in a single year. Non-resident property owners are required to make a tax declaration for each quarter in which they have earned rental income. “Impuesto Sobre la Renta de no Residentes” is a tax on rental income for non-resident landlords in Spain. For the tax year 2020, the tax rate is 19% for residents of the EU, Norway and Iceland. Meanwhile, the tax rate is 24% for citizens of other countries. If the property is not rented out, non-residents must submit a deemed tax return.

=== Quarterly tax filing deadlines ===
Non-resident owners of Spanish property are required to file four different quarterly tax returns throughout the tax year. These tax returns are due in January, April, July and October.

=== Plusvalia tax ===
Plusvalia tax in Spain is a local tax charged by the local Town Hall on properties, at the moment they are sold. It is calculated on the value of the property and depends on the number of years that have passed since the property was previously sold.

=== Deemed tax returns for a property in Spain ===
Deemed tax is a tax paid by non-residents in Spain who own properties located in the country that were not rented. Where a property has only been let for part of a year, Spanish Deemed tax is applicable only for the period in which it was vacant or occupied by the owner for personal use. Landlords are required to file a non-resident income tax return (Form 210) to report the “deemed income”. The deadline for non-residents to file a deemed tax return is 31 December of the following tax year.

== Social Security contributions ==
Most sorts of employment income earned are subject to social security contributions, by both the employee and the employer. The standard rate for the employee is 6.35%. The employer pays what corresponds to 29.90% of the employee's salary. The current maximum monthly Social Security base is EUR3,596.98 (2015). Any income exceeding that maximum base is not subject to both employee and employer contributions.

== See also ==
- Beckham law
- Alcabala
- Capital gains tax
- Taxation in Andorra
- Taxation in France
- Taxation in Portugal
- TaxDown
