= Beckham law =

Spanish tax decree

Beckham Law
- Long title: Real Decreto 687/2005, de 10 de junio, por el que se modifica el Reglamento del Impuesto sobre la Renta de las Personas Físicas, aprobado por el Real Decreto 1775/2004, de 30 de julio, para regular el régimen especial de tributación por el Impuesto sobre la Renta de no Residentes, y se eleva el porcentaje de gastos de difícil justificación de los agricultores y ganaderos en estimación directa simplificada.
- Citation: BOE-A-2005-9875
- Territorial extent: Spain

The "Beckham law" (Spanish: ley Beckham; Royal Decree 687/2005) is a Spanish tax decree passed in June 2005. The law gained its nickname after the footballer David Beckham became one of the first foreigners to take advantage of it. However, the law is aimed at all foreign workers (particularly the wealthier ones) living in Spain. Upon application and acceptance by authorities, such individuals become liable for Spanish taxes based on their Spanish income and assets but avoid such taxes on their non-Spanish income and assets.

== Background ==
Under Spanish tax law, individuals who spend 183 days or more during a tax year in Spain are normally deemed tax resident. Temporary absences are ignored when determining residency unless a person can prove that he is habitually resident in another country. Thus, footballers coming to Spain would automatically become Spanish tax residents on the day count rule (over 183 days) and, as Spanish residents, would have been liable to Spanish tax on their foreign income and assets.

However, the Royal Decree 687/2005 modifies this law with respect to wealthy foreign workers. To ease the tax burden and to attract the likes of Beckham and top executives, the government introduced amendments to the definition of tax residency.

On 10 June 2005, the Spanish government approved Royal Decree 687/2005 implementing the personal income tax regulations in relation to article 9.5 of the Spanish PIT Law. The "Beckham law", as it is commonly known, regulates the procedure that applies to the new Spanish tax regime for expatriates in force since 1 January 2004.

The change of legislation allows an individual who has relocated from another country to Spain the choice of being taxed as a Spanish resident or as a non-Spanish resident. The choice applies in the year of arrival in Spain and continues for the following five years. By electing to be nonresident, an individual can limit their liabilities to Spanish taxation to apply to Spanish income and assets only and hence exclude their foreign income and assets. Thus under the Spanish non-resident income tax rules, they may avoid tax on their foreign income for a period of up to six tax years provided certain conditions are met.

Should such an election be made, the expatriate will be subject to Spanish taxes on their Spanish source income and on their assets located or exercisable in Spanish territory, calculated at a flat 24% tax rate on salary income. This is instead of being taxed on the progressive tax scale for resident individuals (ranging from 19% up to 45%) during the year of becoming tax resident in Spain and for the following five consecutive years. Under this option, the taxpayer gets no personal allowances or other deductions from gross income (e.g. for mortgage costs) and thus for lower earners, it does not always result in a lower tax burden.

In November 2009 it was reported that the law was under review, and foreigners entering Spain after 1 January 2010 would not be able to benefit in the same way as previously. However the law remains in force as of 2023.

== Conditions ==
Individuals cannot invoke the Beckham law if they resided in Spain in the previous 5 years (was 10 years) prior to settling in Spain.

They must have relocated to Spain to take up employment under a contract.

Employment duties must be carried out in Spain, although working outside of Spain up to 15% of the time is permitted.

The employer must either be a Spanish company or Spanish entity or if not a Spanish resident then the employer must operate through a permanent establishment in Spain.

The income derived from employment is not deemed exempt under Spanish income tax law.

== Sources ==
- Sonia Velasco; Monica Garcia Perrote (23 November 2009). "Government Considering Cap on 'Beckham Law'" (PDF). Tax Notes International: 574. Archived from the original (PDF) on 8 July 2011 – via Tax Analysts.
