= Santiago Abascal =

Spanish politician (born 1976)

Santiago Abascal MP
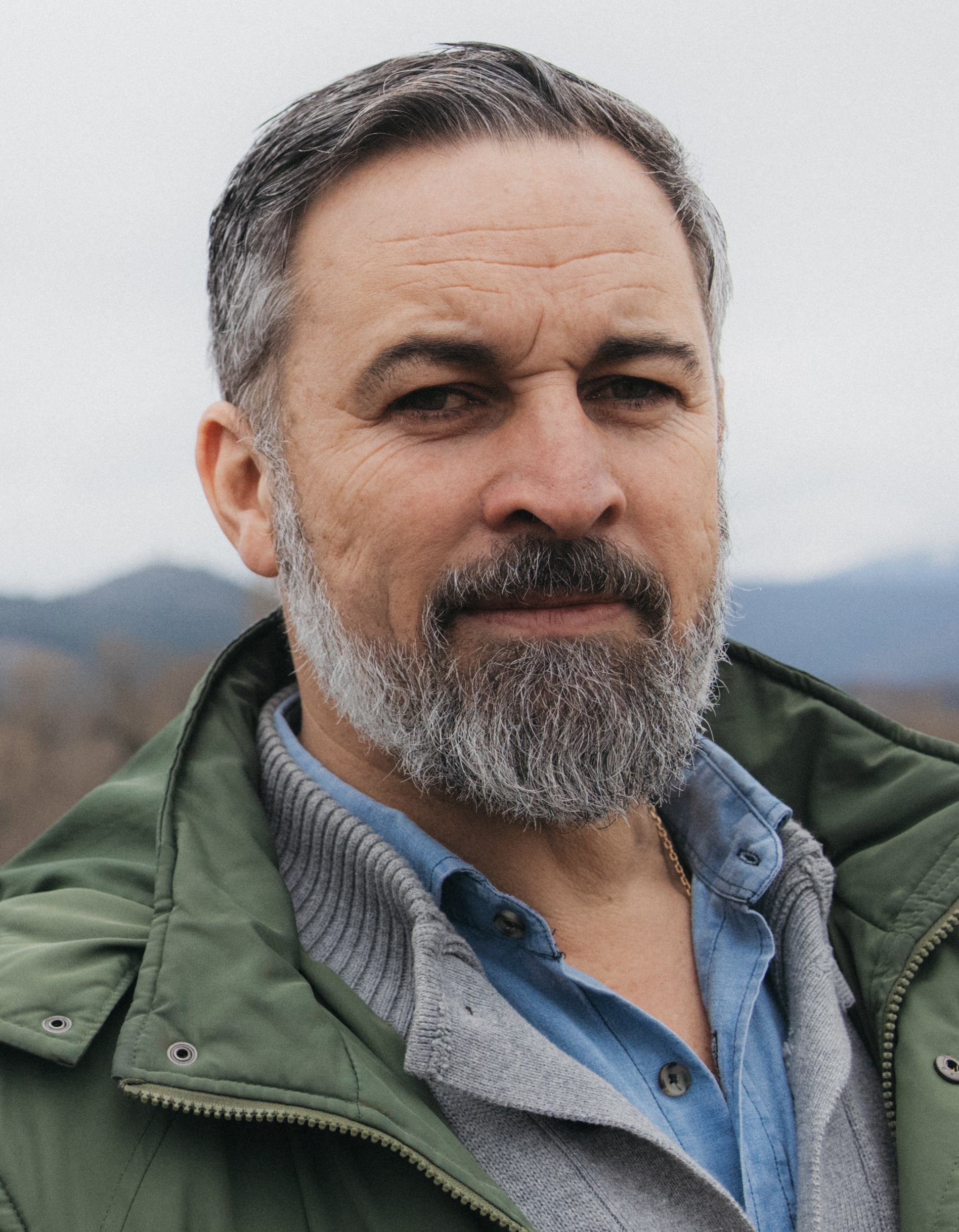
- Abascal in 2026

President of Vox
- Incumbent
- Assumed office 20 September 2014
- Vice President: Jorge Buxadé; Ignacio Garriga
- Preceded by: José Luis González Quirós

President of Patriots.eu
- Incumbent
- Assumed office 16 November 2024
- Vice President: Kinga Gál
- Preceded by: Gerolf Annemans

Member of the Congress of Deputies
- Incumbent
- Assumed office 28 April 2019
- Constituency: Madrid

Director of the Data Protection Agency of the Community of Madrid
- In office 4 February 2010 – 28 December 2012
- President: Esperanza Aguirre
- Preceded by: Antonio Troncoso
- Succeeded by: Position abolished

Member of the Basque Parliament
- In office 4 October 2005 – 6 January 2009
- Constituency: Álava
- In office 16 January 2004 – 22 February 2005
- Constituency: Álava

Member of the General Assembly of Álava
- In office 13 June 2003 – 3 February 2005
- Constituency: Vitoria

Member of the City Council of Llodio
- In office 13 June 1999 – 16 June 2007

Personal details
- Born: Santiago Abascal Conde; 14 April 1976 (age 50) Bilbao, Basque Country, Spain
- Party: Vox (since 2014)
- Other political affiliations: People's Party (1994–2013)
- Spouse(s): Ana Belén Sánchez Cenador (m. 2002; div. 2010) Lidia Bedman (m. 2018)
- Children: 5
- Parent: Santiago Abascal Escuza (father)
- Education: University of Deusto

Santiago Abascal Conde (Spanish: [sanˈtjaɣo aβasˈkal ˈkonde]; born 14 April 1976) is a Spanish politician who has been the president of Vox, a right political party, since 2014. He has also been the president of Patriots.eu since 2024, and has been a member of the Congress of Deputies representing Madrid since 2019.

Before the creation of Vox, Abascal was a member of the centre-right People's Party. As member he served as legislator in the Basque Parliament, founded the Spanish nationalist group Fundación para la Defensa de la Nación Española ('Foundation for the Defence of the Spanish Nation', abbr. Fundación DENAES), and was appointed the director of two public agencies of the Community of Madrid.

== Early life ==
Abascal was born on 14 April 1976 in Bilbao, and grew up in the Province of Álava. His father Santiago Abascal Escuza was a politician and a member of the People's Party, and his grandfather Manuel Abascal Pardo was obliged to be the mayor of Amurrio from 1963 to 1979, during the Francoist era and Spanish transition to democracy. Because of their political work, Abascal's family was routinely threatened by the terrorist group ETA, which forced him to routinely move around with armed security since he was in his early 20s.

== Political career ==
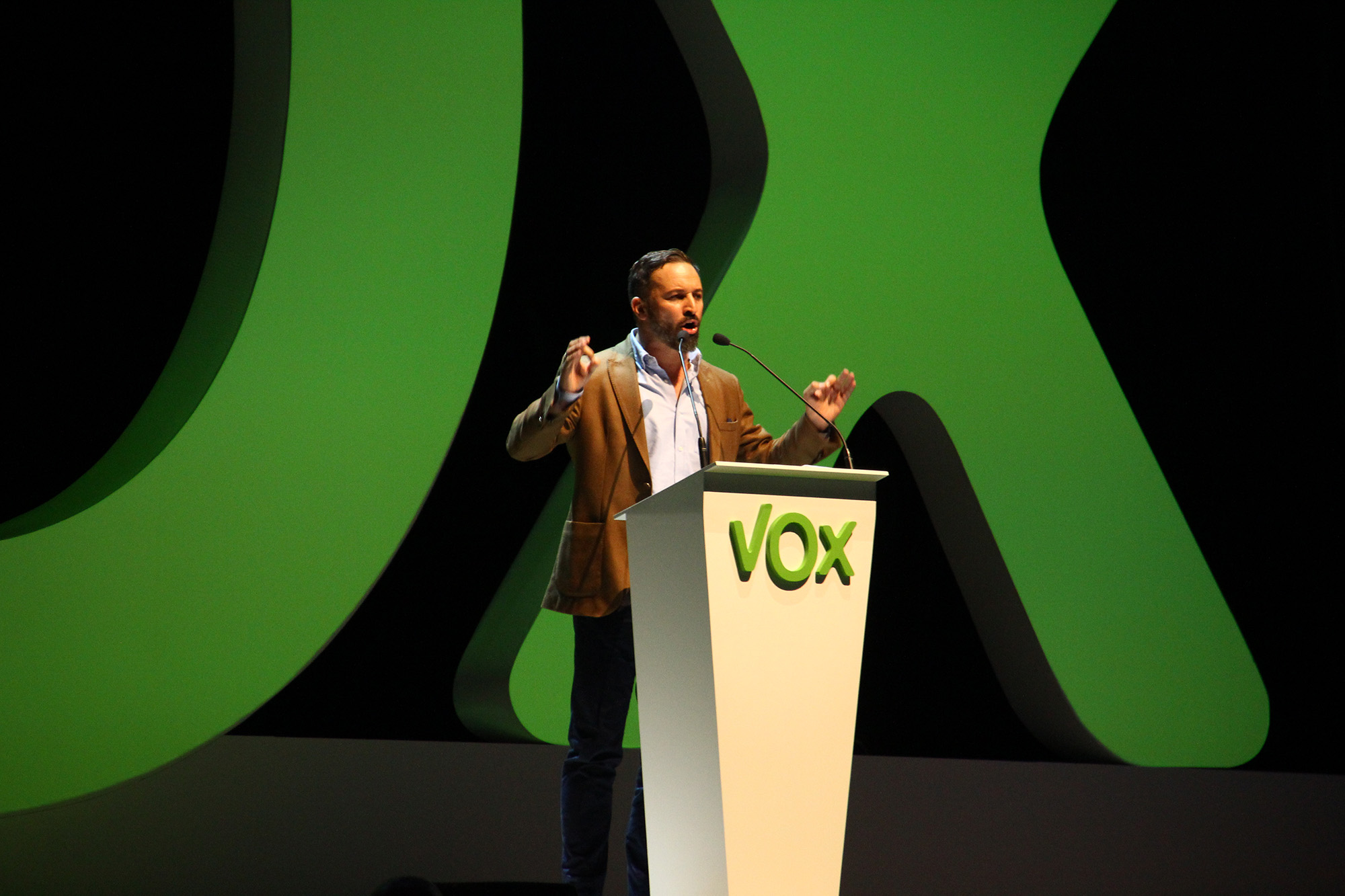
Abascal giving a speech in 2018 in Vistalegre

Abascal became a member of the People's Party when he was 18, in 1994. He was city councillor of Llodio for two terms (1999–2007). He served in the Basque Parliament from January 2004 to February 2005 representing Álava. He later served again in the regional legislature from October 2005 to January 2009.

After he left Basque politics, Esperanza Aguirre, regional president of the Community of Madrid, hired him as director of the Community of Madrid Data Protection Agency, where he served from February 2010 to December 2012. Abascal was later appointed to another post as Director of the Foundation for Patronage and Social Sponsorship (2013), a publicly funded entity without known activity during Abascal's spell.

Abascal left the PP in 2013 and helped found a new party, Vox, which was formed on the same day that the Foundation for Patronage and Social Sponsorship dissolved. After Vox's bad result in the May 2014 European Parliament election in which it failed to obtain any seats, inner strife followed between a faction represented by party members such as Ignacio Camuñas, José Luis González Quirós and Alejo Vidal-Quadras, and a hardline faction, featuring Abascal along with other figures of the DENAES Foundation. The moderate faction became estranged from the party, and Abascal became the new president on 20 September 2014.

Abascal is a member of the Congreso de los Diputados representing Madrid since May 2019. His party came third in the election for the 14th Congreso, characterised by the BBC as a "far-right surge".

During the 2020 and 2021 electoral campaigns for regional elections in the Basque Country and Catalonia, multiple electoral events featuring Abascal as one of the speakers were attacked by political opponents.

== Political positions ==
Abascal's political programme for 2018 included the expulsion of all illegal immigrants, the construction of "impassable walls" in the Spanish African enclaves of Ceuta and Melilla, the prohibition of the teaching of Islam, the exaltation of "national heroes", the elimination of all regional parliaments and opposition to Catalan nationalism. He used anti-Muslim rhetoric in 2019 and called for a new Reconquista of Spain. Vox increased its share of the vote from 0.2% to 10% in the general election of 2019.

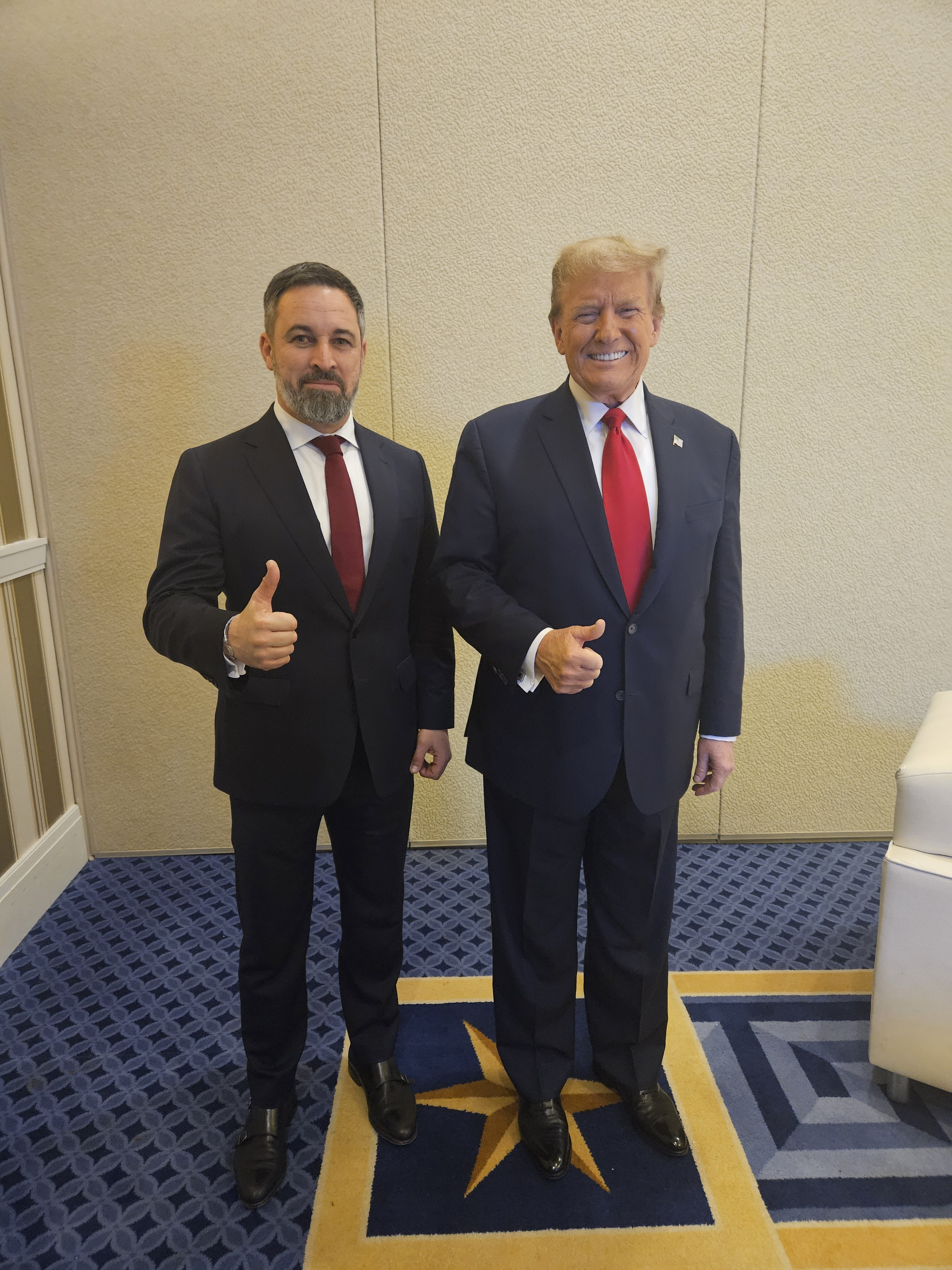
Abascal with Donald Trump in February 2024

Abascal says if Spain is to have immigration, it needs to be legal and to favour countries from Latin America which already speak Spanish, and share common values. He calls for quotas of immigrants. He has stated that an immigrant from Latin America is not the same as an immigrant from a Muslim country.

Abascal believes that global warming is the "greatest scam in history". He is opposed to Agenda 2030.

Abascal criticised Spanish PM Pedro Sánchez's unilateral recognition of a Palestinian state, saying that it amounts to legitimising the "satanic terrorism" of Hamas, the Palestinian Islamist group responsible for the 7 October attacks. He further criticised Sánchez for knowing "nothing of Israel's history". Months before, the Spanish prosecutor's office had opened an investigation following Abascal's suggestion during an interview with the Argentine newspaper Clarín that a time might come when people would want to "hang [Sánchez] by the feet".

In January 2026, Abascal strongly opposed the Sánchez government's plan to regularise up to 500,000 undocumented migrants, denouncing the measure as a reward for illegality and a threat to public services. He accused Sánchez of encouraging mass immigration through what he described as a "pull effect" and framed the amnesty as part of a broader policy that would undermine Spanish sovereignty and national identity.

Despite Abascal's efforts to distance the party from Núcleo Nacional, a group under judicial investigation for hatred, antisemitism, unlawful association and illegal possession of weapons, in November 2026 two members of the party displayed stickers bearing the group's logo.

Abascal supports cutting government spending, various subsidies and taxes on workers and small businesses. He called for eliminating taxes on tips and cutting taxes for those who are self-employed and small businesses. He has cited Arthur Laffer and the Laffer curve as reasoning to support his cuts. Some of the government subsidies he wants to put under review are those going to political parties, unions, and organizations supporting ESG and equality policies.

== Personal life ==
He married Ana Belén Sánchez, who was herself a PP candidate in local elections in Llodio and Zuia; they had two children. They subsequently divorced. In June 2018, he married the Spanish blogger and influencer Lidia Bedman with whom he had three children.

Abascal is a longtime member of the Spanish Ornithological Society. Abascal is an affiliate of the ultraconservative association HazteOir (HO) and was the recipient of a HO Award in 2012.

Due to recurrent death threats for his political views and work, Abascal is licensed to carry and use a handgun for self-defence. Namely, the licence type B, granted to civilians proved to experience a real and high risk of being attacked. Under strict Spanish gun laws, such licenses are rare, as only about 0.02% of the population own them.

=== Hobbies ===
Outside politics, Abascal enjoys football, hiking, horseriding and motorbiking.

=== Football ===
Abascal is a football fan, though describes himself as "not much of a football fan [these days]". He has a "deep affinity" for the Spain national team and is a supporter of La Liga club Real Madrid.

Abascal was controversially invited to the VIP zone at a La Liga match between Real Madrid and Athletic Bilbao (the club of his home city of Bilbao) in 2019. He was also controversially invited to watch a Segunda División match between Rayo Vallecano and Albacete by Rayo Vallecano President Raúl Martín Presa, which prompted Rayo fans to dress up as cleaners and clean the stadium the following day.

Abascal is critical of the politics of Athletic and Barcelona (Real Madrid's arch rivals), accusing them of mixing politics with sport.

Government offices
Preceded by Antonio Troncoso	Director of the Data Protection Agency of the Community of Madrid; 2010–2012	Office abolished
Party political offices
Preceded by José Luis González Quirós	President of Vox; 2014–present	Incumbent
