= Ignacio Garriga =

Spanish politician (born 1987)

Ignacio Garriga MP
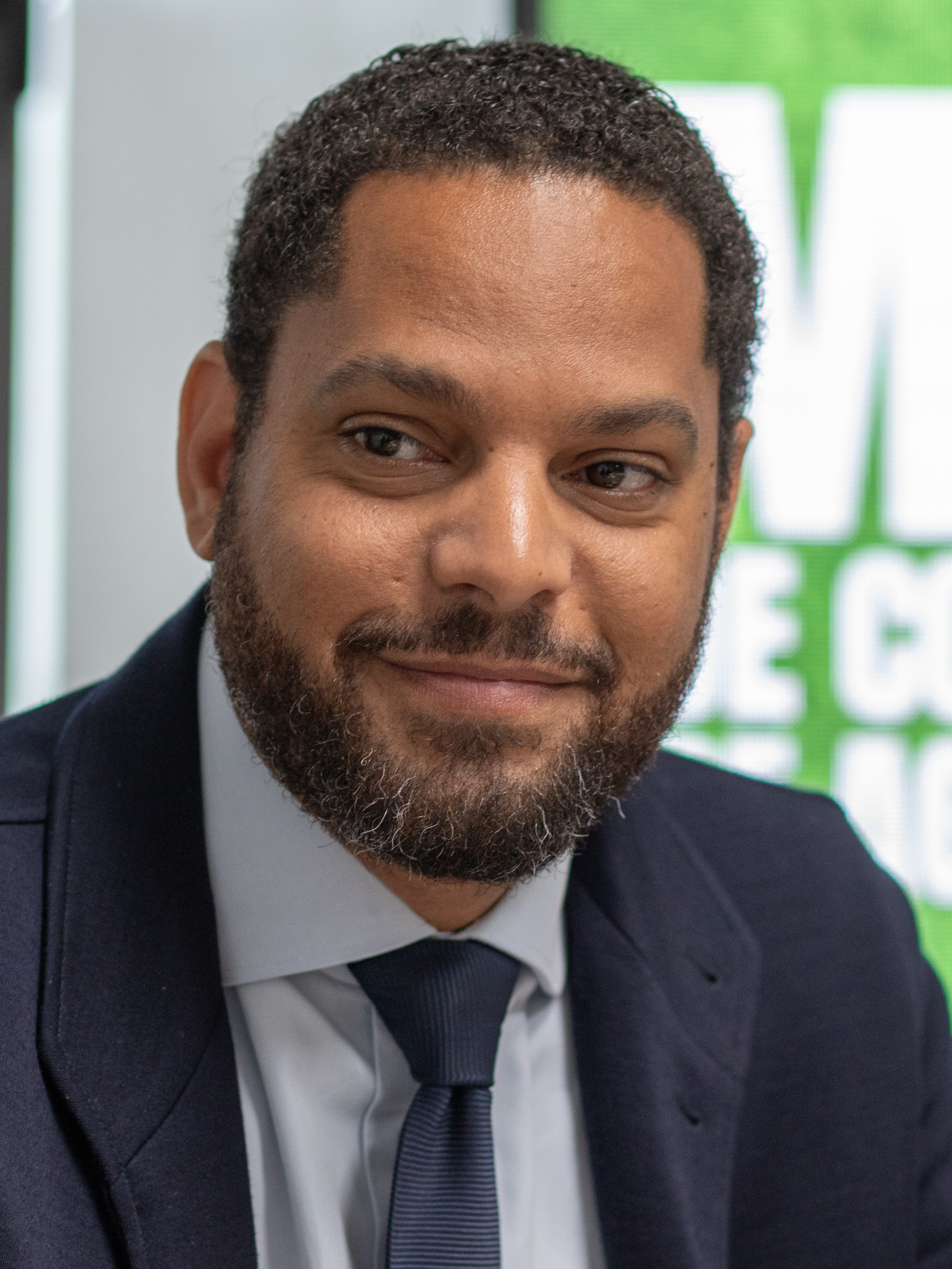
- Garriga in 2024

Secretary-General of Vox
- Incumbent
- Assumed office 6 October 2022
- President: Santiago Abascal
- Preceded by: Javier Ortega Smith

Member of the Parliament of Catalonia
- Incumbent
- Assumed office 12 March 2021
- Constituency: Barcelona

Member of the Congress of Deputies
- In office 21 May 2019 – 11 March 2021
- Constituency: Barcelona

Personal details
- Born: Ignacio Garriga Vaz de Conceição; 4 February 1987 (age 39) Sant Cugat del Vallès, Spain
- Party: Vox (2014–present)
- Other political affiliations: People's Party (2005–2010)
- Children: 4
- Education: International University of Catalonia

Ignacio Garriga Vaz de Conceição (born 4 February 1987) is a Spanish politician as well as a former dentist and professor. He is known in the Spanish media for being the only Afro-Spaniard elected politician within the far-right Vox party. In October 2022 he became Secretary General of Vox.

== Personal life ==
Garriga was born in Sant Cugat del Vallès to a Spanish father named Rafael of maternal Belgian descent and an Equatoguinean mother named Clotilde. His mother is also of Portuguese descent through her father. Clotilde's parents, Mercedes and Pablo, owned a supermarket in Malabo, but after the death of Pablo, Mercedes sent Clotilde and her seven brothers to live in Barcelona. His father, Rafael Garriga Kuijpers, comes from a political family where both his father and brother (Ignacio's grandfather and uncle) were both involved in nationalist organizations. Garriga's cousin is Juan Garriga Domenech who has also since become active in Vox.

Garriga is one of five children and grew up speaking Catalan as his first language. He considers himself 100% Spanish. Before becoming a politician Garriga worked as a dentist. He is married and has one daughter and three sons. He has worked as a professor at the Faculty of Dentistry of the International University of Catalonia.

== Political career ==
Garriga was previously a member of the People's Party, but left in 2010 after disagreements on the party's stance on gay marriage, abortion, Spanish unity, and immigration.

Garriga joined Vox in 2014. Due to being the only black politician in the party, he is sometimes described as the "Black Catalan of Vox", although Garriga rejects this label, arguing that he is Spanish, and that the name is racist. He supports mandatory deportation of illegal immigrants. Garriga has stated that Vox is Christian humanist, and the most accepting political party in Spain. Garriga identifies as Catalan but is strongly opposed to the Catalan independence movement.

Garriga was elected to the 13th Congress of Deputies in the April 2019 Spanish general election. He was re-elected to the 14th Congress of Deputies in the November 2019 Spanish general election. In 2020, he resigned his seat in the Congress after becoming a representative in the Catalan Parliament and was replaced by Carlos Segura.

Since August 2020, Garriga is the leader of Vox in Catalonia. In October 2022, he was promoted to secretary general of Vox.

== See also ==
- Bertrand Ndongo, Vox member born in Cameroon
