= Alcabala =

Sales tax

The alcabala or alcavala (Spanish pronunciation: [alkaˈβala]) was a sales tax of up to fourteen percent, the most important royal tax imposed by Spain in the early modern period. It applied in Spain and the Spanish dominions. The Duke of Alba imposed a five percent alcabala in the Netherlands, where it played an important role in the Dutch Revolt. Unlike most taxes in Spain at the time, no social classes were entirely exempt (for example, nobles and clergy had to pay the tax), although from 1491 clergy were exempt on trade that was "not for gain." Certain towns were also, at times, given exemptions.

== Etymology ==
According to the Diccionario de la lengua española de la Real Academia Española (DRAE) (22nd edition, 2001), the word derives from the Arabic alqabála. Editions of the DRAE from 1956 to 1991 state that that Arabic word means a "contract" or "tax". The 1726 edition agrees that the word comes from Arabic, and gives two possibilities, preferring the one that corresponds closely to the current view. They cite Padre Alcalá as saying it comes from cabála or cabéle, to receive, collect or deliver. They offer an alternative from Sebastián de Covarrubias, gabál, to limit or tax. In either case, these words would be preceded by the Arabic article Al. The Arabic term alqabala or al qabála is essentially the same word as Kabbalah.

The term is often used in the plural, las alcabalas, also embracing some other related taxes.

== Rate and significance ==
The alcabala was the most important royal tax imposed by the Spanish crown, first imposed in 1342. The other tax of comparable importance was the diezmo, a tithe for the support of the Catholic Church, a substantial portion of which went to the Crown by virtue of agreements with the Holy See.

The rate of the alcabala varied over time, from as low as two percent to as high as fourteen percent. It was by no means equally imposed everywhere: rates would differ in various parts of the empire, certain goods would be exempted from the alcabala (sometimes because they were considered subsistence goods, sometimes because they fell under a different tax), and tax farming often led the royal treasury to contract with a city government or merchant guild to collect the tax in a particular geographical area and pay a fixed sum to the Spanish treasury. There were numerous specific exemptions such as (from the time of Philip II onwards) horses and mules, hunting birds, and books.

Unlike a modern value added tax, the full amount was (at least in theory) charged at each transaction so, for example, the same food could be fully taxed as grain, meal, and bread. Eventually, baked bread was exempted from the tax.

In 1341, the rate of the alcabala was five percent. It was doubled to ten percent in 1491 and reduced back to five percent in 1539. By 1793, in some places in peninsular Spain it had reached fourteen percent; it was reduced that year to seven percent.

It is not entirely clear what these rates meant in practice. It does not appear that the tax was consistently collected in full. For example, it appears the during the reign of Philip II, "small villages often paid as little as three-and-a-half per cent".

== Collection ==
The relatively limited administration of a 15th-century government was ill-prepared to collect a sales tax, therefore tax farming was more or less inevitable. Because taxes in different jurisdictions were farmed out separately, and because rates were not equal everywhere, the tax location of a particular transaction was important. This could be tricky if, for example, a transaction was made in one place for delivery in another. The theory was that the tax was paid where the article finally came to rest; if goods were handed over at a different place to avoid payment, the fine could be four times the tax owed. There were rules requiring permission to move goods from one town or village to another.

Sellers were supposed to notify the tax farmer of transactions within two days and pay the tax to the alcabalero within three days after that, again on possible penalty of four times the tax owed. Sellers were allowed to make arrangements to pay a fixed, periodic tax instead of paying on each transaction. Buyers were also supposed to report, as a check on the sellers. If the seller was from outside the area, or was a cleric, priest, local council official or a powerful individual ("hombre poderoso"), the buyer was required to report the transaction in advance, and could be held liable if the seller did not pay the tax.

== History ==
Although the origin of the alcabala is unclear, and it may have dated back to the era of Muslim rule, it is known that in 1342 Alfonso XI of Castile convinced the Cortes Generales (the equivalent of a parliament) to make it a royal duty for Castile. Originally the tax was specified to run for three years. However, reality might have been a more complicated story. For example, a 19th-century Spanish legal dictionary says that in 1341 it was conceded to Alfonso for three years to defray the costs of the Siege of Algeciras (1342-1344), extended in 1345 to maintain the costs of frontier castles, further extended in 1349 for the siege of Gibraltar and in 1388 for the war with Portugal, finally becoming perpetual in 1393.

While Isabella I considered applying the alcabala to Spain's American colonies as early as 1503, in fact it was not applied there until the late 16th century. It was imposed in Mexico in 1574 and Peru in 1591. Typically the capitulaciones (contracts) for those who set out to conquer territory for Spain gave them a certain period of exemption from the alcabala. For example, through the capitulación between the Crown and Francisco Pizarro, Peru was supposed to be exempt from the alcabala for a century, though in practice the Crown did not wait quite so long.

The alcabala was a trigger for unrest in Quito when it was first imposed there in the 1590s, and for the Quito Revolt of 1765. In the latter case, the viceroy of New Granada, told to increase revenues but apparently without any direct order from Madrid as to the means by which to do so, had given instructions to remove collection of the alcabala and the brandy monopoly from private tax-farmers and to have royal officials collect the tax directly. An increase to six percent in the late 1770s led to violence in the Viceroyalty of New Granada (northern South America) in 1780–1781 and in Arequipa (Southern Peru) in 1780. While these rates of six percent led to violence in the Americas, rates in the Americas were generally lower than in the Spanish mainland. This was the same era in which disputes over taxes were a major factor leading to the American Revolution in what became the United States.

In the late 18th century, the alcabala generated 2.5 million pesos annually in Mexico and 600,000 pesos in Peru.

The alcabala was abolished in the Spanish tax reform of 1845.

== Another use of the term ==
The term alcabala also refers to military checkpoints in Colombia and Venezuela.
