= Joan Garriga Doménech =

Catalan politician

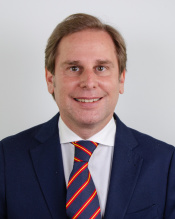

Member of the Parliament of Catalonia
- Incumbent
- Assumed office 14 February 2021

Personal details
- Born: 1973 (age 52–53) Barcelona, Spain
- Party: Vox (2019-)
- Education: University of Barcelona

Joan Garriga Doménech (born 1973 in Barcelona) is a Catalan politician from Spain, member of the Parliament of Catalonia for the Vox party since 2021. He currently serves as the regional president of Vox in Barcelona.

Domenech was born in Barcelona and is the first cousin of fellow Vox politician Ignacio Garriga. He holds a degree in business administration and worked as an asset manager in the property sector. He was previously associated with the Platform for Catalonia party before joining Vox.

During the 2021 Catalan regional election he was elected to the Catalan Parliament for the Barcelona. In politics, he has been a member of the Catalan Family Forum and the Right to choose: Freedom of Education pressure group. His election was met with some controversy among political opponents after it was revealed he had been accused of hate speech by a Catalan court after distributing campaign literature in 2011 during his time with the Platform for Catalonia which was accused of having racist and misleading content. However, following his election Domenech agreed to sign a statement against discrimination on grounds of race, sexuality and gender with other members of the Parliament.

Domenech lives in Barcelona and is married with five children.
