= Vox (political party) =

Spanish political party since 2013

- President: Santiago Abascal
- Secretary-General: Ignacio Garriga
- Vice president: Ignacio Garriga
- Spokesperson: José Antonio Fúster
- Spokesperson in Congress: Pepa Millán
- Leader in the European Parliament: Jorge Buxadé
- Founded: 17 December 2013; 12 years ago
- Split from: People's Party
- Headquarters: C / Bambú, 12 28036 Madrid
- Think tank: Fundación Disenso
- Youth wing: Vox Jóvenes
- Labour wing: Sindicato Solidaridad
- Membership (2026): ▲63,468
- Ideology: Ultranationalism; National conservatism; Right-wing populism; Political unitarism; Euroscepticism
- Political position: Far-right
- Religion: Christianity (Catholicism)
- European affiliation: ECR Party (2019–2024); Patriots.eu (since 2024)
- European Parliament group: ECR Group (2019–2024); PfE (since 2024)
- International affiliation: Madrid Forum
- Colours: Green
- Slogan: "Make Spain Great Again" (2026)
- Congress of Deputies: 32 / 350
- Senate: 5 / 266
- European Parliament: 6 / 61
- Regional parliaments: 120 / 1,268
- Regional Governments: 4 / 19
- Mayors in Spain: 33 / 8,122
- Town councillors: 1,695 / 67,121

Party flag

Website
- voxespana.es
- Politics of Spain; Political parties; Elections; A: Vox is often considered part of the radical right, a subset of the far-right that does not oppose democracy.

Vox (Spanish: [boks]; Latin for 'voice'; often stylised in all caps) is a nationalist and far-right Eurosceptic political party in Spain. Founded in 2013, it is led by party president Santiago Abascal, and vice president and secretary-general Ignacio Garriga.

The party entered the Spanish parliament for the first time after winning seats in the April 2019 general election. Later that year, it received 3.6 million votes in the November 2019 general election, winning 52 seats and becoming the third-largest party in the Congress of Deputies. Its public support reached its peak within the next few years, according to the results of subsequent regional elections and opinion polling, but in the 2023 Spanish general election it showed worse results: a loss of 19 seats in parliament (albeit remaining the third-largest political party in Spain with roughly 3 million votes). In the European Parliament, the six deputies of Vox are members of Patriots for Europe after a stint in the European Conservatives and Reformists Group.

== History ==
=== Early years ===
==== Origins (2013–2014) ====
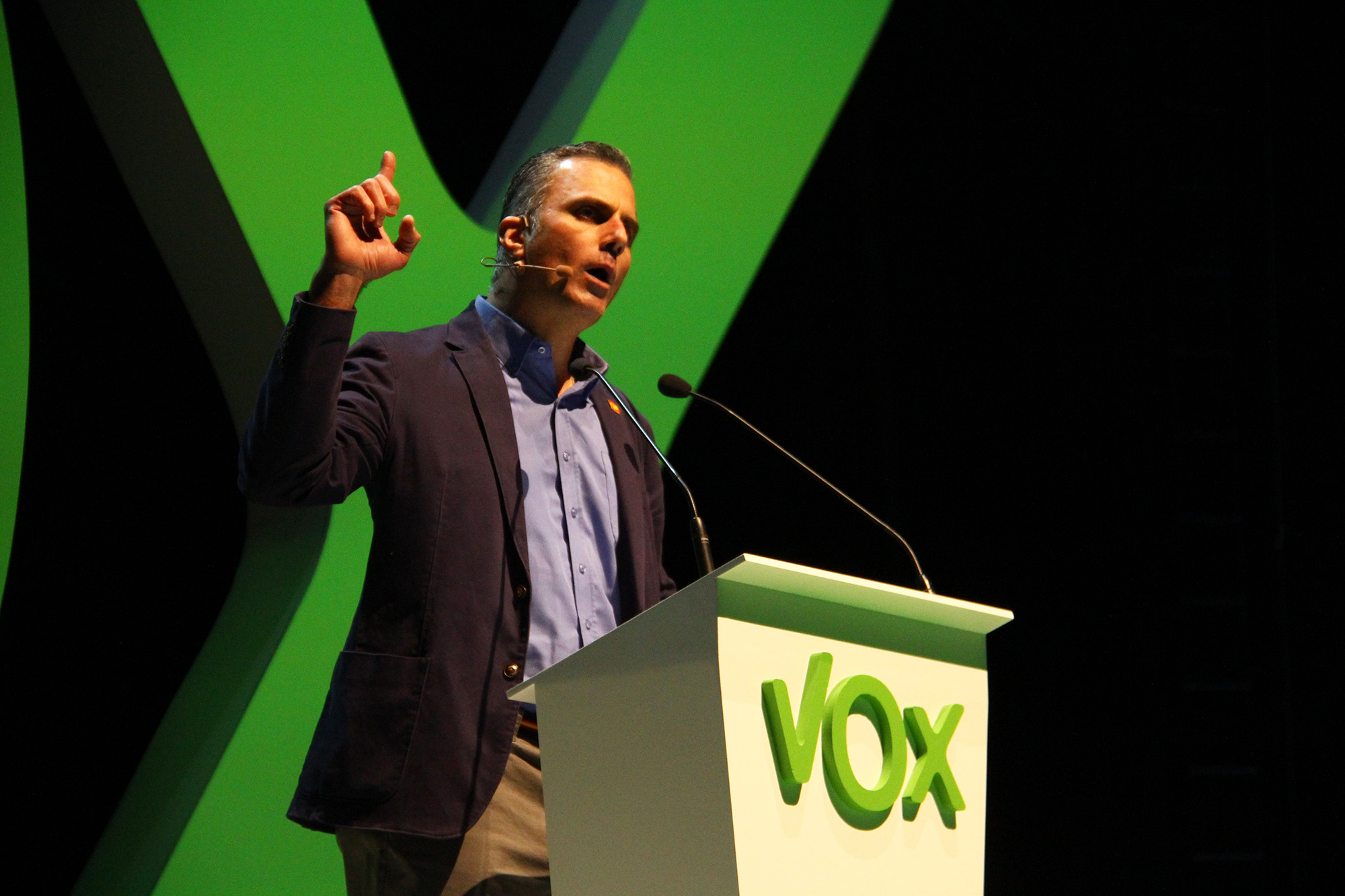
Javier Ortega Smith giving a speech in 2018

Vox was founded on 17 December 2013, and publicly launched at a press conference in Madrid on 16 January 2014, as a split from the People's Party (PP). This schism was interpreted as an offshoot of "neoconservative" or "social conservative" PP party members. (Note: Pablo Carmona suggests Vox can be indeed adequately interpreted as a sort of evolution of the People's Party from the last years of the leadership of José María Aznar.) The party platform called for the rewriting of the Spanish constitution so as to curb regional autonomy and abolish regional parliaments. Several founding members of the party (for example, Alejo Vidal-Quadras, José Antonio Ortega Lara, and Santiago Abascal) had been members of the platform "reconversion.es", (Note: Spanish: reconversión, lit. 'reconversion; restructuring') which had issued a manifesto in 2012 calling for a recentralisation of the State. Vidal-Quadras was proclaimed as the first chairman in March 2014.

Their initial funding, totalling nearly 972,000 euros, came in the form of individual donations from supporters of the National Council of Resistance of Iran (NCRI) and of People's Mojahedin Organization of Iran (MEK), thanks to their "personal relationship" with Vidal-Quadras, who had supported the NCRI during his stint in the EU Parliament. There is no evidence that Vox has broken Spanish or EU funding rules by accepting these donations.

The 2014 European elections marked the first time the newly formed Vox fielded a candidate, with Vidal-Quadras running under its banner, though he narrowly failed to retain his seat in the European Parliament. Vidal-Quadras later left the party due to both the political failure at the European election and his inability to impose his stances in the party. He would argue in 2018 that the party shifted from a "liberal conservative, Europeanist, and reformist" proposal (represented by himself), to a "nationalist, revisionist, Eurosceptic and confessional" one.

==== Abascal's early leadership (2014–2017) ====
In September 2014, the party elected Santiago Abascal, one of the founders, as its president, and Iván Espinosa de los Monteros, also a founder, as General Secretary. Eleven members of the National Executive Committee were also elected.

The party took part in the 2015 and 2016 general elections, scoring 0.23% and 0.20% of the votes respectively.

Amidst the Spanish constitutional crisis precipitated by the Catalan referendum, Vox opted to not participate in the Catalan regional elections of 2017. After the Catalan declaration of independence, the party sued the Parliament of Catalonia and several independentist politicians. Its membership grew by 20% in the span of forty days immediately following this action.

=== Electoral breakthrough ===
==== Entrance into institutions (2018–2019) ====
On 10 September 2018, Vox enlisted Juan Antonio Morales (an independent legislator in the regional parliament of Extremadura who had dropped out of the PP parliamentary group) as a party member. On 2 December 2018, they won 12 parliamentary seats in the Andalusian regional election, entering a regional parliament for the first time. It supported the coalition regional government by Ciudadanos and the Popular Party. With this result, Vox obtained a first seat in the Senate, which was taken by Francisco José Alcaraz.

The party obtained 10.26% of votes in the April 2019 general election, electing 24 Deputies and entering the Congress of Deputies for the first time. Later, the party entered the European Parliament for the first time with 6.2% of the votes and three Eurodeputies, a number that increased to four after Brexit. After the election, the party joined the European Conservatives and Reformists group and the European Conservatives and Reformists Party, having declined the invitation to join the Identity and Democracy group (which included such far-right parties as National Rally, League, and Alternative for Germany). In the second general election of the year in November, Vox came third and increased its number of deputies from 24 to 52. It was the most-voted party in the Region of Murcia and the autonomous city of Ceuta.

==== COVID-19 pandemic (2020–2021) ====
At the beginning of 2020, during the onset of the global COVID-19 pandemic, Vox called for travel restrictions between China and Spain, and later between Italy and Spain, to safeguard against the "Chinese virus". At the time, the epidemic was already in full swing in those countries, but it was prior to any COVID cases being officially confirmed within Spain in significant numbers. This position found no support among other parties, and it was criticised as xenophobic rhetoric. The party claims that serious counter-COVID measures were deliberately delayed in Spain by the government, which hid the information and downplayed known risks to allow for mass public events on International Women's Day (8 March) to take place, as these events were important for the left wing agenda of the newly formed coalition government of PSOE and UP. At the same time, Vox went forward with their own global party conference on 8 March in Vistalegre, where party supporters from all parts of Spain were invited. The conference resulted in numerous cases of COVID infection, including confirmed cases of COVID transmission between members of Vox leadership. This fact was often brought up by Vox opponents to criticize Vox attitude towards COVID situation in Spain.

During the anti-COVID lockdown and follow-up restrictions, Vox routinely criticised government measures as inefficient, partisan, and partially unconstitutional. In April 2020 the party appealed to the Constitutional Court of Spain against the first State of Alarm (15 March – 21 June) declared by the government. In October 2020, Vox's parliamentary group at the Congress of Deputies tabled a motion of no confidence against Prime Minister Pedro Sánchez, bringing Santiago Abascal as an alternative candidate. The motion failed to gain any support among the other parliamentary groups, gathering 52 'yes' votes (those of Vox legislators) and 298 'no' votes (the rest of the chamber). In November 2020 Vox appealed to the Constitutional Court of Spain against the second State of Alarm (October 25, 2020 – May 9, 2021) declared by the government.

In the face of the 2020 United States presidential election, Vox was fully supportive of President Donald Trump's candidacy, even tweeting from its official account that Joe Biden was the preferred candidate of "El País, Podemos, Otegi, Maduro, China, Iran and pedophiles", which according to the international news agency EFE was echoing QAnon conspiracy theories. Vox took part in the 2021 CPAC conference and refused to acknowledge Biden's victory.

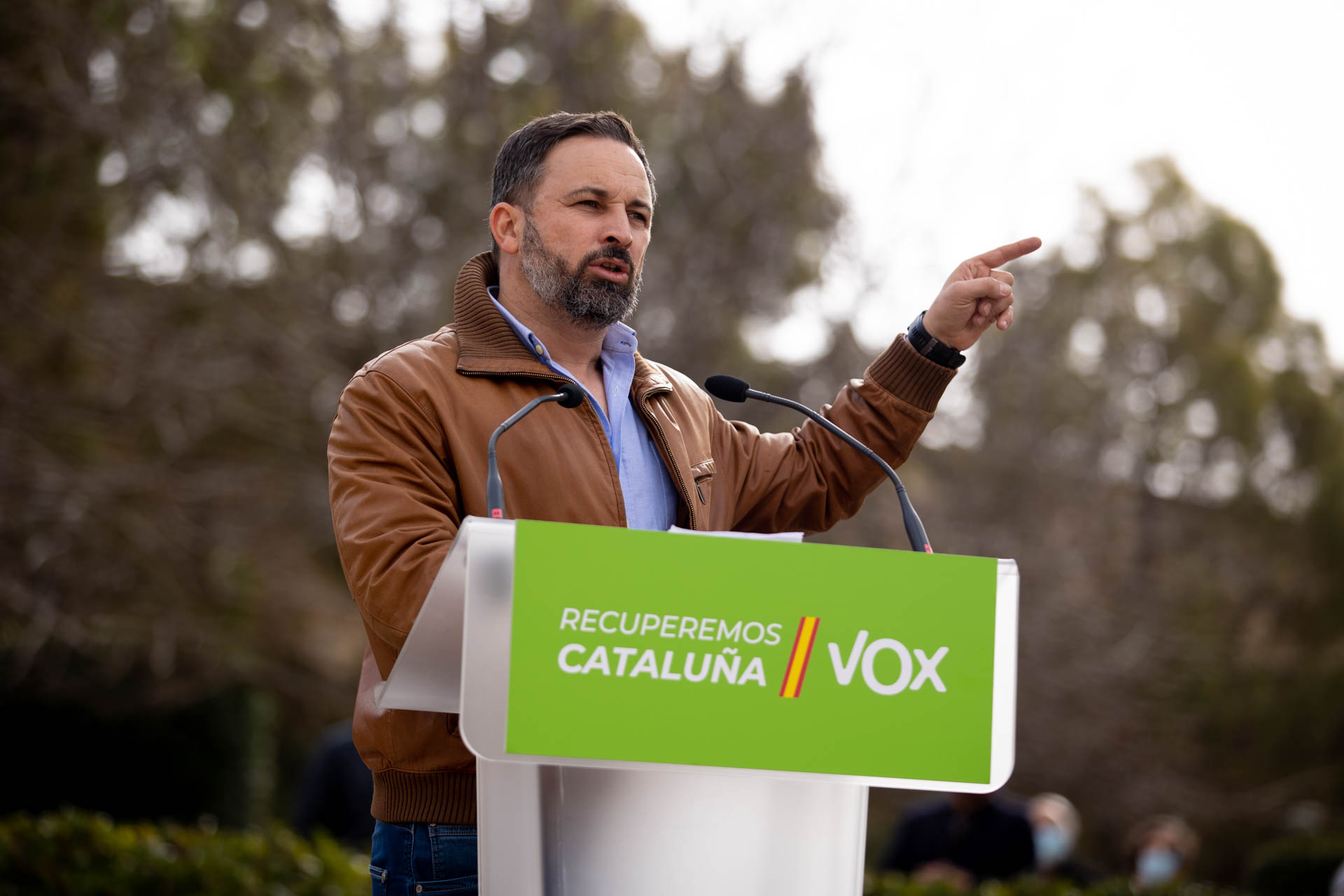
Santiago Abascal during a rally in 2021

At the beginning of 2021, Vox's abstention was instrumental in securing European COVID-recovery funds on Socialist terms. Many Vox supporters considered this as the "largest error in Vox's history".

During 2020 and 2021 electoral campaigns for regional elections in the Basque Country, Catalonia, and the Community of Madrid multiple legal electoral events of Vox were physically attacked by radical political opponents on the premises of "Vox's legitimate electoral events in some regions being provocative acts". The view of the events as provocations was endorsed by high ranking UP members, including their speaker Pablo Echenique, and their leader, the Second Deputy Prime Minister of Spain at the time, Pablo Iglesias.

On 14 July 2021, in response to Vox's appeal the previous year, the Constitutional Court of Spain declared by a narrow majority (six votes in support vs. five votes against) that the first anti-COVID State of Alarm was unconstitutional in the part of suppressing the freedom of movement established by Article 19 of the Constitution. In October 2021 the Constitutional Court of Spain supported two other appeals by Vox, and declared unconstitutional the closing down of Spanish Parliament and Senate in the beginning of the pandemic, and the second State of Alarm. As reported on 22 October 2021, the Government of Spain ordered all fines collected in relation to the first State of Alarm to be returned to citizens.

==== Entering regional governments (2022–2023) ====
On 13 February 2022, Vox came third in the 2022 Castilian-Leonese regional election, raising its representation from 1 up to 13 seats, and becoming the key player for the rival People's Party (PP), who won the elections, to form a government. Following this election result, and an unfolding leadership crisis in PP, Vox for the first time was recognized as Spain's second political force, according to some opinion polls for the next general elections. In March 2022, it was announced that Vox would form government with the PP in Castile and León, taking three of ten ministerial positions including vice president for regional leader Juan García-Gallardo. Vox member Carlos Pollán was elected President of the Cortes of Castile and León, the position of speaker. This represents the first participation of Vox in any regional government.

On 19 June 2022, Vox came third in the 2022 Andalusian regional elections. With Macarena Olona as the leading candidate, the party improved over the previous regional elections, gaining about 100,000 more votes, and two more seats in the Parliament of Andalusia, but fell short of the expectations to achieve significantly better results and become the key to the new regional government. In the aftermath of elections, despite initial promises to stay and lead Vox's opposition group in Andalusia, on 29 July 2022, Olona announced her decision to resign and left politics due to unnamed "medical reasons".

In March 2023, Vox, for the second time, tabled a motion of no confidence against the government of Pedro Sánchez, with Ramón Tamames as alternative, independent candidate. The motion failed with 53 votes in favour, 201 votes against, 91 abstentions, and four absentees.

In May 2023, local and regional elections were held in Spain. Vox, as the minor partner, formed the government with the PP in the Valencian Community, though the PP ordered that Vox's lead candidate Carlos Flores would not take part in the government, due to his 2002 conviction for harassment of his ex-wife. After protracted negotiations, Vox also joined PP governments in Extremadura and Aragon. Despite not forming the government, Vox was awarded the speaker's role in the Parliament of the Balearic Islands in exchange for abstaining on the vote and thereby allowing a PP government. Again as the smaller of the two parties, Vox formed local governments with the PP in cities such as Elche, Toledo, Valladolid, Guadalajara and Burgos.

=== Stabilisation and reconfiguration ===
==== 2023 general election and aftermath (2023–2024) ====
A general election took place in July 2023, for which the PP was widely forecast to win and obtain a majority with support from Vox. In what BBC News called a surprise result, Vox fell from 52 seats to 33, losing half a million votes; the PP took the most seats but fell short of a majority even with Vox's support. Vox's reduced presence in the Congress meant that it lost its ability to appeal the government's legislature to the Supreme Court; it had previously used this right to challenge Sánchez's legislation on transgender issues, euthanasia and the COVID-19 pandemic. After the election, some political journalists noted Spain had followed an opposite trend to other European countries such as Sweden, Finland and Italy where conservative-nationalist parties had scored strong results and opined Vox's communication style had turned off voters and that the disappearance of Ciudadanos (whose votes mostly went to the PP) had indirectly penalized Vox as the electoral system is weighted to favour bigger parties. Abascal partly blamed the People's Party whom he argued had been too triumphalist in campaigning on behalf of the right, claiming "They sold the bear's skin before they had even hunted it. That is clearly the reason why there was a lack of mobilisation [of voters]."

In the aftermath of the general elections, many members of the "liberal family of Vox" left the party or lost their influence in favour of the syndicalist wing, headed by Jorge Buxadé.

In late 2023, Vox promoted the youth organisation Revuelta, which is seen by some media as the party's covert youth wing. Revuelta took part in the 2023–2024 Spanish protests.

Vox held a major rally in Madrid in May 2024 in anticipation of the European elections. Receiving support from international politicians including Argentinian President Javier Milei and French presidential candidate Marine Le Pen, as well as other politicians from Italy, Hungary, France, and Portugal.

==== Withdrawal from regional governments (2024–present) ====
In response to the conservative People's Party's decision to grant asylum to a number of undocumented underage immigrants in their respective regions, Vox decided on 11 July 2024 to step out of the coalition governments it had formed in the regions of Aragon, Castile and León, Murcia, Extremadura and the Valencian Community, as well as withdrawing its external support to the regional governments of the Balearic Islands and Cantabria. On 5 July 2024, the party joined the Patriots for Europe European party, abandoning Giorgia Meloni's ECR. With their new group, Vox held a rally of force on 8 February 2025, in Madrid, alongside Viktor Orbán and other right-wing leaders, vowing to reconquer Europe as a reference to Spain's own Reconquista against Islam.

Vox's withdrawal from regional governments and opposition to the PP minority government's budget plans led to snap elections in Extremadura in December 2025 and Aragon in February 2026. Vox doubled its seats in both regions, leaving the PP reliant on its support to form a government.

== Ideology ==
Vox identifies as a "right-wing without complexes" and regards itself as an alternative to both the "cowardly right" of the People's Party and the "orange fickle" of Citizens. In November 2018, during a party event in Murcia, party leader Santiago Abascal defined his party as "antifascist, anti-Nazi and anti-communist". The party has been described as simply right-wing, a populist radical-right (in contrast to an extreme right), far-right, and also neo-Francoist.

According to certain analysis, the main tenets in Vox's ideology are a strong anti-immigration stance and advocacy for stricter law and order policies, a strong defence of the unity of Spain against all who allegedly want to break or undermine it, an opposition to what it labels the "progressive dictatorship," and a strong defence of Catholicism and traditional values. Guillermo Fernández Vázquez, who described Vox as "economically anti-statist and neoliberal" as well as "morally authoritarian", believes that the party holds positions similar to Jörg Haider's Freedom Party of Austria or Jean Marie Le Pen's National Front, likening its emergence to an archaic radical right party more worried about modernising its image. Vox's approach to cultural issues would be in line with old school Spanish nationalist parties, restricting the scope of "culture" to "language and tradition".

According to Xavier Casals, the unifying part of Vox's ideology is a war-like ultranationalism identified by the party with a palingenetic and biological vision of the country—the so-called España Viva—as well as a Catholicism-inspired culture. He says that ideological roots of the party's ultranationalism lie in incondicionalismo, 'unconditionalism', the nationalist discourse based on the "fear of amputation of the homeland" coined in the 19th century in Colonial Cuba against Cuban separatism, and autonomist concessions (replicated in Catalonia in the 1910s). Casals writes that the party's discourse has also revived the myth of the Antiespaña ("Anti-Spain"), an umbrella term created in the 1930s by the domestic ultranationalist forces to designate the (inner) "Enemies of Spain", creating a simplistic España viva/Antiespaña duality that comes handy for communicating via social media. Casals notes, regarding the external projection of its discourse, that the party has reanimated the concept of "Hispanidad"; party leader Abascal has stated that an immigrant coming from a "brotherly Hispanic-American country" is not comparable to the immigration coming from "Islamic countries".

The party has appealed to conspiracy theories invoking the figure of George Soros as a mastermind behind Catalan separatism and the alleged "Islamisation" of Europe. During his participation in the April 2019 general election debate, Santiago Abascal used a phrase of the fascist Ramiro Ledesma Ramos, founder of the Juntas de Ofensiva Nacional-Sindicalista (JONS): "only the rich can afford the luxury of not having a homeland."

=== Internal factions ===
In 2023, Barcelona-based journalist Stephen Burgen and Spanish political scientist Pablo Simón argued that Vox had grown to contain two factions which adhere to different influences; they cited a more hardline wing close to leader Santiago Abascal which they claim takes inspiration from nationalist European parties and figures such as Viktor Orbán in Hungary and the right-wing nationalist faction of Law and Justice in Poland, and a second wing containing former party spokesman Iván Espinosa de los Monteros who identify more with the British Conservative Party and whose role models would be Margaret Thatcher and Ronald Reagan. Espinosa de los Monteros quit politics in August 2023, although he officially remained a member of the party, and downplayed his discrepancies with Vox's main line.

=== Domestic policy ===
Vox supports the constitutional monarchy and wants to repeal the Historical Memory Law. The party wants to reform the Spanish electoral system "so the vote of every Spaniard is worth the same".

Vox publicly criticised and opposed the exhumation of Francisco Franco. The party has been described as taking a revisionist approach towards Francoist Spain, with also the leader of the party, Santiago Abascal, stating that "life was better under Franco", and that the Civil War was caused by the PSOE, the Revolution of 1934 ("coup"), the assassination of José Calvo Sotelo and the attempted assassination of José María Gil-Robles.

Vox advocates the recentralisation of Spain by abolishing Spain's autonomous communities, in order to establish a unitary state. Vox is a Spanish nationalist party and as such it strongly opposes separatist movements in the country, particularly the Catalan independence movement and Basque nationalism. Vox promotes the illegalisation of separatist parties in Spain, such as EH Bildu or ERC. The party opposed the pardoning of Catalan independence activists convicted for organising an illegal independence referendum.

=== Society ===
Vox has been described as socially conservative and the party has positioned itself as a defender of the natural family by advocating traditional family values and natalism. Party member Rocío de Meer has accused the left of trying to abolish the family. The party opposes "gender ideology".

Vox has been described as anti-feminist, and wants to repeal the gender violence law, which they see as "discriminatory against one of the sexes", and replace it with a "family violence law that will afford the same protection to the elderly, men, women and children who suffer from abuse". Left-leaning critics believe Vox undermines the importance of feminist struggle in the advancement of women's liberties by means of linking the latter to a culture with "Christian foundations".

Vox is opposed to abortion and rejects the legalization of euthanasia. The party supports bullfighting, which it considers an important element of Spanish culture that should be defended.

==== Criminal justice ====
Vox advocates law and order policies and calls for "safe neighbourhoods", typically linking the notion to "safe borders" in opposition to the "immigrant invasion". The party supports preventive measures against crime, including the increase of sentences for violent crimes and imposing life sentences for sexual offenders and abusers. Casals writes that Vox's brand of Spanish nationalism is linked to an unconditional support of the State Security Forces and Corps.

Vox has proposed that citizens should be allowed to keep arms at home, and supports the castle doctrine, but does not support the right to carry arms or the free sale of firearms. Party leaders Santiago Abascal and Javier Ortega are both licensed to carry handguns for self-defence due to recurrent threats to their lives.

==== LGBTQ+ issues ====
Vox opposes same-sex marriage but supports same-sex civil unions. While not openly opposed to homosexual adoption, party members want to prioritise heterosexual couples. Vox opposes the Ley Trans approved by the Spanish government in June 2021, believing that the law "attacks the rights of women, children, biology, and common sense". Vox congratulated the Hungarian parliament for passing legislation that would ban media and educational content which may be seen by minors from depicting LGBT individuals or addressing LGBT issues.

Vox has been accused of homophobia, which the party denies. Party leader Santiago Abascal has denied said allegations by stating that Vox merely opposes "LGBT ideology", going on to say that many homosexuals are party members, and that he personally has gay friends. José María Marco, a gay conservative, contested the April 2019 Senate election in Madrid as Vox's candidate, and also ran second in the party list for the 2019 Madrilenian regional election. In some discourses, party leaders have suggested that their opposition to mass immigration from Islamic countries effectively protects the LGBT community, as homosexuality is largely prosecuted in Islamic cultures, and that most immigrants do not alter their attitude upon arrival to Spain.

=== Immigration ===
Vox positions itself strongly against illegal immigration. It calls for the unconditional deportation of all illegal immigrants, as well as the legal ones who commit crimes; the tightening of Spanish immigration laws; legal actions against non-profits (e.g. Proactiva Open Arms) and organised crime facilitating illegal immigration; and the militarization of problematic borders. The party emphasises its support for legal immigration complying with the Spanish law. It promotes a stricter control of immigration according to the needs of the national economy, with preference for immigration from Hispanic America on the premise of easier integration of such immigrants into Spanish society, as opposed to those from Islamic countries. Opponents of Vox consider the party xenophobic and anti-immigrant.

Vox has been described as nativist and advocates natalist policies. The party is very critical of multiculturalism; in 2020, Vox deputy Rocío de Meer described neighbourhoods such as Molenbeek in Brussels or Barbès in Paris as "multicultural dung heaps". Other members have used the same term, such as party leader Santiago Abascal during a failed motion of censure, and deputy Ignacio Garriga. The party has been accused of giving credit to the Great Replacement theory.

Vox supports increasing the requirements to acquire the Spanish nationality, which would include the lack of a criminal record, increasing the years of residence required from 10 to 15, and proving knowledge of the Spanish language, culture and history. The party advocates the denaturalisation of foreigners who commit certain crimes.

During the Russian invasion of Ukraine, Vox supported the accommodation of Ukrainian refugees in Europe. According to Abascal, "these are real war refugees, women, children, and elderly people", unlike "young Muslim males of military age invading Europe's borders with the intention to destabilise and colonise it".

In June 2025, Vox published an economic and housing program calling for "remigration" of legal immigrants who "decide not to integrate" in Spain, "mass deportations" of immigrants, and an "exhaustive audit of all nationality concessions granted in recent years" with the goal of withdrawing them.

During the 2023 general election, Vox created a group "Latinos por Abascal" to appeal to Latin American voters, including evangelicals and anti-communists. In January 2026, Vox removed the 'Latinos por Abascal' website, amid an internal debate about Latin American migration.

==== Islam ====
While Vox's official platform only contains proposals against Islamic fundamentalism, public statements made by party figures have been accused of constituting Islamophobia, helping to underpin, according to Casals, their discourse against Maghrebi immigration, and in favour of the development of a closer bond to Catholicism. The party advocates for the closure of fundamentalist mosques as well as the arrest and expulsion of extremist imams. Vox has openly called for the deportation of tens of thousands of Muslims from Spain. In 2019, the party's leader demanded a Reconquista, 'reconquest' of Spain, explicitly referencing a new round of expulsions of Muslim immigrants from the country.

=== Economy ===
Vox's economic policy is often described as economically liberal or neo-liberal. The party defends the liberalisation of Spanish labour laws, lower taxation, and support for the self-employed. Its discourse also includes calls to cut inefficient and superfluous government spending, particularly pointing out at the costs associated with the administration of regional and local governments. Its platform also includes protectionist stances, advocating some benefits for national companies over large multinational corporations, and criticising globalization. In 2020, Vox launched its own anti-communist workers' union named Solidaridad (Solidarity).

In its program for the 2023 Spanish general election, Vox proposed an overhaul of the Spanish fiscal system, with a radical reduction of income tax down to two levels of 15% and 25%, reduction of added-value taxes, and the abolition or reduction of other state taxes. The party supports suppressing the VAT in the purchase of a first house, but only for Spaniards.

=== Services ===
Vox supports the re-centralisation of education, healthcare, and security from the autonomous communities.

==== Education ====
Vox promotes the "pin parental" policy, which aims to guarantee parental rights over the public education their children receive by not requiring obligatory attendance to classes contradicting their parents' values. Party representatives claim that Spanish national and regional authorities abuse the public education system by imposing their political and ideological agenda on children.

==== Healthcare ====
Vox supports establishing a single medical card useful across the entire country, as opposed to the existing model. The party opposed mandatory vaccinations during the COVID-19 pandemic. Vox favours Spain's withdrawal from the World Health Organization (WHO).

==== Energy and environment ====
The party's discourse about the environment has changed over time, going from climate change denial to a conservationist approach. However, the party still opposes the mainstream environmental views, labelling them as "Green religion", and has voted against the Law for Climate Change and Energy Transition, which was adopted anyway.

Vox supports nuclear energy and wants to stop the closure of nuclear plants.

=== Foreign policy ===
Vox is opposed to globalisation and advocates a strong nation-state, wishing to recover national sovereignty. The party wants to emphasise bilateralism in international relations, and supports abandoning supranational organizations opposed to Spain's interests. It supports increasing military spending.

==== Europe ====
Vox's views on the European Union have been described as either Eurosceptic or Soft Eurosceptic, arguing that Spain should make no sovereignty concessions to the EU in order to guarantee national sovereignty. The party is strongly opposed to the EU becoming a federal superstate and instead argues for a Europe of "strong and sovereign states" that "defends its borders and its Christian roots and opposes multiculturalism and mass immigration". Political scientists Andrés Santana and Lisa Zanotti noted that out of all the parties in Spain, Vox's voters and grassroots activists were the most likely to oppose Spain's membership of the EU. In July 2021, party leader Abascal signed a statement opposing the EU's "federalist drift" with Viktor Orbán, Marine Le Pen, Jarosław Kaczyński and Giorgia Meloni, among others.

Vox calls for Spain to regain sovereignty over Gibraltar, and supports extra efforts to safeguard Spanish control of Ceuta and Melilla. The party opposes recognising Kosovo's independence. Abascal has condemned the annulment of the 2024 Romanian presidential election, describing it as a stolen election and an attack on Romanian sovereignty.

At the beginning of the 2022 Russian invasion of Ukraine, Vox took a strong pro-Ukrainian stance, announcing its support to "all measures" to defend Ukraine, including shipments of armaments to Ukraine. However, in 2024, Vox began to shift its views on Ukraine, with Abascal criticising the €1 billion "that Spaniards do not have" in Spanish aid to Ukraine, expressing concern over potential escalation through Western countries supplying Ukraine with long-range missiles for use against Russian soil, and calling for an end to the conflict "as soon as possible". The party supports U.S.-led peace efforts in Ukraine, accusing other Spanish political parties of "celebrating the continuation of the war". However, Vox opposes deployment of Spanish troops as peacekeepers in Ukraine.

==== Americas ====
Vox took a strong pro-American stance, particularly during the Trump administration, while strongly criticising Biden's presidency. The party welcomed Trump's second term, although it was divided on his tariff policy.

Vox opposes the Government of Cuba and supports closer relations with Javier Milei's Argentina. The party is strongly opposed to Nicolás Maduro's regime in Venezuela, recognising both Juan Guaidó and later Edmundo González as rightful presidents, and opposing the alleged fraud in the 2024 elections.

==== Middle East ====
Vox supports the State of Israel within the context of Israeli–Palestinian conflict. A document on their website titled "VOX, Israel and the Middle East" commends Israel's democratic system and its fight against Islamic extremism. The document criticises the Boycott, Divestment and Sanctions (BDS) movement and advocates for strengthening ties between Spain and Israel in all areas.

In May 2024, Abascal voiced criticism towards Prime Minister Pedro Sánchez for unilaterally recognising a Palestinian state, describing this action as a scandalous reward to Hamas, and promised to reverse said recognition.

In November 2024, Abascal advocated for stronger relations between Israel and Saudi Arabia along with Argentine President Javier Milei for Spain to form a trio of the following three.

Vox criticised Sánchez's opposition to the 2026 Iran war, believing that it would harm Spain's economic and security ties with the United States.

== Organization ==
=== Leadership ===
==== Presidents ====
President		Time in office
1.	Alejo Vidal-Quadras	8 March 2014 – June 2014 (provisional)
–	José Luis González Quirós	June 2014 – 20 September 2014 (interim)
2.	Santiago Abascal	20 September 2014 – present

==== Secretaries-general ====
Secretary-General		Time in office
1.	Iván Espinosa de los Monteros	2014 – 2016
2.	Javier Ortega Smith-Molina	2016 – 2022
3.	Ignacio Garriga	2022 – present

==== Vice-presidents ====
Vice-president		Time in office
1–3.	Jorge Buxadé, Javier Ortega Smith and Reyes Romero	2022 – 2024
4.	Ignacio Garriga	2024 – present

=== Membership ===
According to the party's annual reports, the party's membership per year is:

Year	Joined	Left	Num. of members at 31 December	Ref.
2016			3,496	
2017	2,045	569	▲4,792	
2018	20,153	1,102	▲23,843	
2019	29,927	1,363	▲52,407	
2020	17,253	7,286	▲62,374	
2021	11,118	10,024	▲63,468	

=== Support ===
A 2020 study based on a statistical analysis of April 2019 general election results found that Vox's support is stronger among the middle-aged, urban population with higher secondary education and at the higher end of income distribution. Authors say that such a voter profile is in direct contrast with that of a typical supporter of radical right parties in other European states, expected to be a man from a rural area with low education and a low income. Vox's support is stronger among voters dissatisfied with the existing politics in Spain, and voters who identify themselves as Spaniards.

A 2021 study of the influence of Spanish party leaders on Twitter during the April 2019 general election campaign found that the messages tweeted during the electoral campaign by Santiago Abascal (Vox) reached the highest diffusion and viralisation capacity compared to Twitter messages by leaders of Cs, PSOE, PP and UP. The main focus of Abascal's tweets, according to the authors, was the Spanish territorial model (27.2%), government and parties (19.3%) and economy (14.5%).

=== International affiliation ===
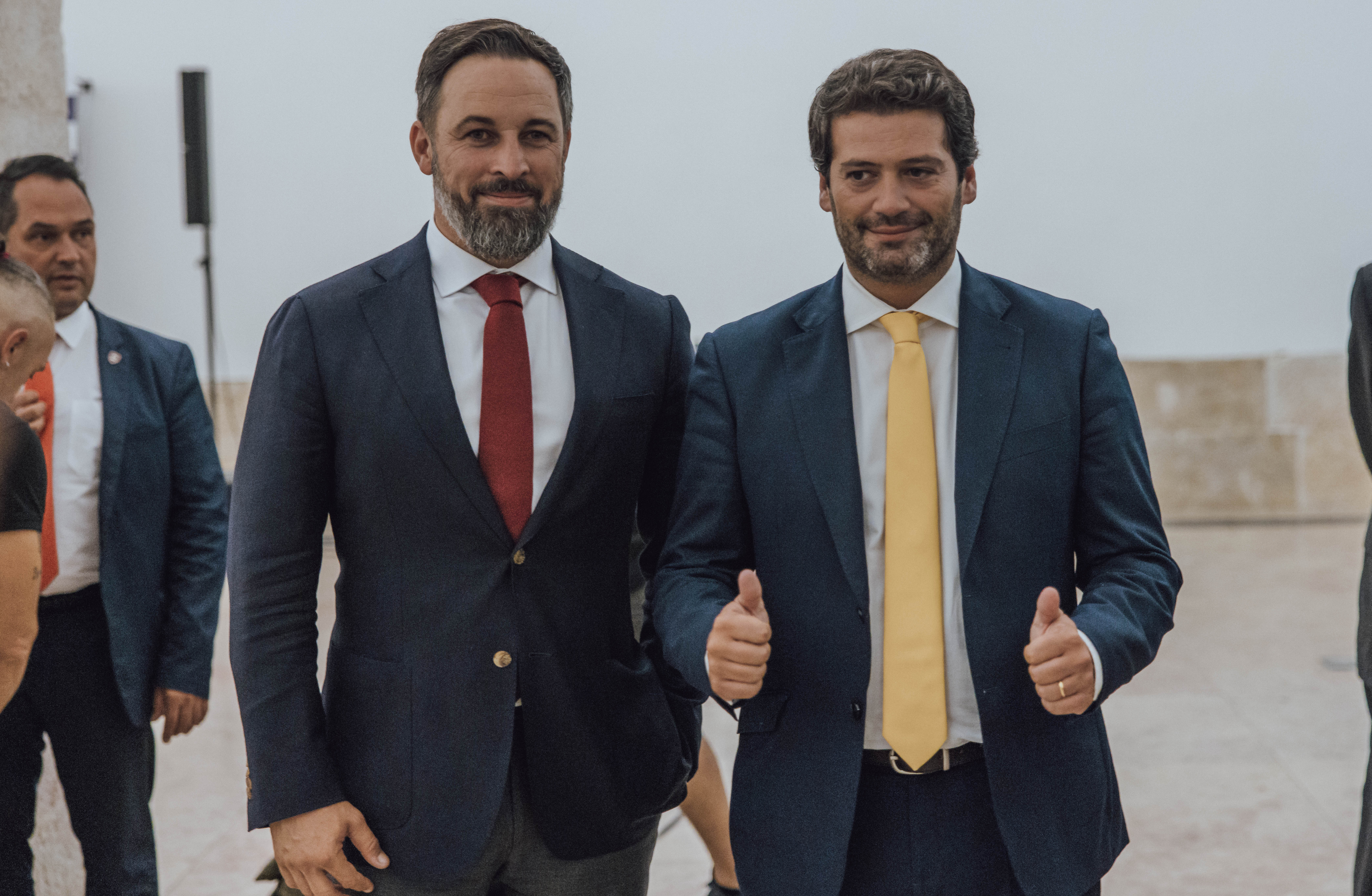
Abascal and Chega leader André Ventura in Lisbon, 2021

Vox was initially close to Matteo Salvini's Lega Nord party in Italy but, by 2021, it grew closer to Giorgia Meloni's Brothers of Italy party instead. In October 2021, Abascal said that Vox has an "unbreakable" alliance with the Portuguese Chega party. Vox has connections to the Serbian People's Party.

In the European Parliament, Vox joined the European Conservatives and Reformists (ECR) after the 2019 elections. As a member of the ECR, Vox shared group with parties such as the Polish Law and Justice, Brothers of Italy, and the Sweden Democrats. In July 2024, Vox left the ECR in favour of the Patriots for Europe group, aligning with longstanding partners of Vox such as the French National Rally, the Hungarian Fidesz and Chega. However, upon doing so, it insisted that Giorgia Meloni's Brothers of Italy would remain a "friend and ally". Abascal and Vox also expressed "full support" for Alternative for Germany, a member of Europe of Sovereign Nations, in the 2025 German federal election.

In the United States, Vox is strongly supportive of Donald Trump and his political ideals. Trump has virtually addressed the annual Viva conference hosted by Vox, and Vox has invited pro-Trump factions of the Republican Party to the Spanish Congress of Deputies.

In Latin America, Vox maintains close ties with the Chilean Republican Party, Javier Milei's La Libertad Avanza in Argentina, Peru's Popular Renewal, Alvaro Uribe's Democratic Centre in Colombia, and Jair Bolsonaro in Brazil. In El Salvador, Vox is aligned with the Nationalist Republican Alliance, which opposes the administration of Nayib Bukele. In September 2021, 15 senators and three deputies from the National Action Party of Mexico met Abascal to sign the Madrid charter.

In February 2019, Vox presented the Madrid Charter; a document that divided political groups in the Americas into the two sides of Western democracies and "criminal" left-wing groups that were "under the umbrella of the Cuban regime", hoping to create an anti-communist alliance. The Madrid Charter called for scholars and the media to adopt and disseminate the ideas of the document. The charter was primarily signed by Venezuelan opposition members, Cuban dissidents and Fujimorists from Peru, with El País writing that Vox gathered groups of evangelicals, Catholics, neoconservatives, right-wing populists and individuals "nostalgic for military dictatorships" to sign the document.

== Electoral performance ==
=== Cortes Generales ===
Cortes Generales
Election	Leading candidate	Congress			Senate			Gov.
Election	Leading candidate	Votes	%	Seats	Votes	%	Seats	Gov.
2015	Santiago Abascal	58,114	0.2 (#15)	0 / 350	196,457	0.3 (#14)	0 / 208	—
2016	Santiago Abascal	47,182	0.2 (#13)	0 / 350	165,740	0.3 (#13)	0 / 208	—
Apr. 2019	Santiago Abascal	2,688,092	10.3 (#5)	24 / 350	5,998,649	8.4 (#5)	0 / 208	—
Nov. 2019	Santiago Abascal	3,656,979	15.1 (#3)	52 / 350	3,229,631	5.1 (#5)	2 / 208	No
2023	Santiago Abascal	3,057,000	12.4 (#3)	33 / 350	7,249,087	10.6 (#4)	0 / 208	No

=== European Parliament ===
European Parliament
Election	Leading candidate	Votes	%	Seats	EP Group
2014	Alejo Vidal-Quadras	246,833	1.6 (#11)	0 / 54	—
2019	Jorge Buxadé	1,393,684	6.2 (#5)	4 / 59	ECR
2024	Jorge Buxadé	1,688,255	9.6 (#3)	6 / 61	PfE

=== Results timeline ===
Year	(Spain) ES	(European Union) EU	(Andalusia) AN	(Aragon) AR	(Asturias) AS	(Canary Islands) CN	(Cantabria) CB	(Castilla–La Mancha) CM	(Castile and León) CL	(Catalonia) CT	(Ceuta) CE	(Extremadura) EX	(Galicia (Spain)) GL	(Balearic Islands) IB	RI	(Community of Madrid) MD	(Melilla) ML	(Region of Murcia) MC	(Navarre) NC	(Basque Country (autonomous community)) PV	(Valencian Community) CV
2014	N/A	1.6	N/A	N/A	N/A	N/A	N/A	N/A	N/A	N/A	N/A	N/A	N/A	N/A	N/A	N/A	N/A	N/A	N/A	N/A	N/A
2015	0.2	1.6	0.5	N/A	0.6	0.2	0.3	0.5	0.7	N/A	1.2	0.3	N/A	N/A	N/A	1.2	N/A	0.8	N/A	N/A	0.4
2016	▼0.2	1.6	0.5	N/A	0.6	0.2	0.3	0.5	0.7	N/A	1.2	0.3	N/A	N/A	N/A	1.2	N/A	0.8	N/A	0.1	0.4
2017	▼0.2	1.6	0.5	N/A	0.6	0.2	0.3	0.5	0.7	N/A	1.2	0.3	N/A	N/A	N/A	1.2	N/A	0.8	N/A	0.1	0.4
2018	▼0.2	1.6	▲11.0	N/A	0.6	0.2	0.3	0.5	0.7	N/A	1.2	0.3	N/A	N/A	N/A	1.2	N/A	0.8	N/A	0.1	0.4
2019	▲10.3	▲6.2	▲11.0	6.1	▲6.4	▲2.5	▲5.1	▲7.0	▲5.5	N/A	▲**22.4**	▲4.7	N/A	8.1	3.9	▲8.9	7.8	▲9.5	1.3	0.1	▲10.6
2019	▲**15.1**	▲6.2	▲11.0	6.1	▲6.4	▲2.5	▲5.1	▲7.0	▲5.5	N/A	▲**22.4**	▲4.7	N/A	8.1	3.9	▲8.9	7.8	▲9.5	1.3	0.1	▲10.6
2020	▲**15.1**	▲6.2	▲11.0	6.1	▲6.4	▲2.5	▲5.1	▲7.0	▲5.5	N/A	▲**22.4**	▲4.7	2.0	8.1	3.9	▲8.9	7.8	▲9.5	1.3	▲1.9	▲10.6
2021	▲**15.1**	▲6.2	▲11.0	6.1	▲6.4	▲2.5	▲5.1	▲7.0	▲5.5	7.7	▲**22.4**	▲4.7	2.0	8.1	3.9	▲**9.1**	7.8	▲9.5	1.3	▲1.9	▲10.6
2022	▲**15.1**	▲6.2	▲13.5	6.1	▲6.4	▲2.5	▲5.1	▲7.0	▲17.6	7.7	▲**22.4**	▲4.7	2.0	8.1	3.9	▲**9.1**	7.8	▲9.5	1.3	▲1.9	▲10.6
2023	▼12.4	▲6.2	▲13.5	▲11.3	▲**10.1**	▲**7.9**	▲**11.1**	▲**12.8**		7.7	▼20.6	▲8.1	2.0	▲**13.9**	▲**7.6**	▼7.3	▲**9.9**	▲**17.7**	▲**4.3**	▲1.9	▲**12.4**
2024	▼12.4	▲**9.6**	▲13.5		▲**10.1**	▲**7.9**	▲**11.1**	▲**12.8**		▲**8.0**	▼20.6		▲**2.2**	▲**13.9**	▲**7.6**	▼7.3	▲**9.9**		▲**4.3**	**▲2.0**	
2025	▼12.4	▲**9.6**	▲13.5		▲**10.1**	▲**7.9**	▲**11.1**	▲**12.8**		▲**8.0**	▼20.6	▲**16.9**	▲**2.2**	▲**13.9**	▲**7.6**	▼7.3	▲**9.9**		▲**4.3**	**▲2.0**	
2026	▼12.4	▲**9.6**	▲**13.8**	▲**17.8**	▲**10.1**	▲**7.9**	▲**11.1**	▲**12.8**	▲**18.9**	▲**8.0**	▼20.6	▲**16.9**	▲**2.2**	▲**13.9**	▲**7.6**	▼7.3	▲**9.9**		▲**4.3**	**▲2.0**	
Year	(Spain) ES	(European Union) EU	(Andalusia) AN	(Aragon) AR	(Asturias) AS	(Canary Islands) CN	(Cantabria) CB	(Castilla–La Mancha) CM	(Castile and León) CL	(Catalonia) CT	(Ceuta) CE	(Extremadura) EX	(Galicia (Spain)) GL	(Balearic Islands) IB	RI	(Community of Madrid) MD	(Melilla) ML	(Region of Murcia) MC	(Navarre) NC	(Basque Country (autonomous community)) PV	(Valencian Community) CV
**Bold** indicates best result to date. To be decided Present in legislature (in opposition); Junior coalition partner Senior coalition partner

== Public profile ==
=== Youth popularity ===
Vox has shown signs of sustained support among younger voters and Santiago Abascal boasts a large social media following. This includes 820,000 followers on Tiktok and 1.2 million on Instagram which is a million more than PP leader Alberto Núñez Feijóo. On Youtube Vox boasts 500,000 more followers than the PP. According to professor of political science at the University of Barcelona (UB), Xavier Torrens, social media is the primary news source for adults ages 18-24. Vox is the top choice of young adult voters with 25% of voters 18-24 saying they would vote for the party in the 2026 Spanish general election. Contemporary history lecturer at the Autonomous University of Barcelona Steven Forti, attributes Vox's appeal to young voters over young people's desire for nationhood, antimigrant, and anti-establishment feelings.

=== Neo-Nazi controversies ===
Vox initially included some former neo-Nazis in party cadres and lists; Vox has since expelled some of them from the party, while others have resigned. The most notable example was the controversy surrounding the historian Fernando Paz Cristóbal, the party's leading candidate in Albacete for the April 2019 general election, who resigned after suffering what he described as "a mediatic hunt", due to Holocaust denial and homophobia.

In 2025, Vox put Jordi de la Fuente (former leader of the neo-nazi Movimiento Social Republicano and then member of Platform for Catalonia), who joined Vox in 2019, at the head of the party's union, Solidaridad. In the same year, a scandal also erupted involving Marcos Francoy (Vox consultant in the Cortes of Aragona, member of the party's provincial executive committee in Huesca and party's candidate for the Senate in 2023), due to Nazi, Falangist, pro-remigration, and racist images he had posted on his X (formerly Twitter) profile.

=== Homophobic statements ===
Multiple Vox politicians have made allegedly disparaging statements about homosexuals. Thus, Fernando Paz Cristóbal (ex-leader of Vox in Albacete, who left the party in 2019) said in 2013: "If I had a gay son I would help him, there are therapies to correct such psychology". Francisco Serrano Castro (ex-leader of Vox in Andalusia, who left in 2020) tweeted in 2017: "Homosexuals have penises and lesbians have vulvas, and don't be fooled, nobody cares about it". Juan E. Pflüger (director of communications of Vox in 2019) tweeted in 2013: "Why do gays celebrate Saint Valentine's day, if their thing is not love, it's just vice".

=== Gaysper controversy ===
During the April 2019 general election, Vox shared a controversial tweet in which it invited its supporters to vote through the claim "Let the battle begin!". The message was accompanied by a photomontage of Aragorn, a protagonist of The Lord of the Rings saga, in which he appeared facing a crowd of orcs, whose figure had been modified and replaced with symbols contrary to the party's ideology: the feminist symbol, the hammer and sickle, the flag of the Second Spanish Republic and the Catalan independence senyera, several logos of media outlets such as El País or Cadena SER, the symbol of the raised fist, the symbol of the anti-fascist movement and, among them, a modified version of the ghost emoji (👻) of the Android 5.0 version with the colors of the LGBT flag.

The use of the ghost in the tweet met with an initial negative reaction from the LGBT community on Twitter. However, it would later end up using it for the creation of memes, and finally as a symbol of the collective in a phenomenon of reappropriation. The icon would end up being known as Gaysper, in a portmanteau of the word gay and Casper the Friendly Ghost; and subsequently spread in press and television. Two PSOE deputies would later attend a parliamentary session in Congress wearing a T-shirt bearing the icon.

=== MENA versus Grandma poster ===
During the elections to the Assembly of Madrid of 2021 held on 4 May, Vox used a very controversial poster in which the faces of a young masked man and an old woman appeared, with the sign between the two saying: "A mena [unaccompanied foreign minor] 4700 euros per month. Your grandmother 426 euros of pension / month". These numbers were debunked by the Department of Social Policies, Families, Equality and Birth of the Community of Madrid. The poster was denounced in court for inciting hatred towards this group, but the court and the appeal ruling did not consider it a crime.

=== Legal proceedings ===
In March 2025, the Anti-Corruption Prosecutor's Office began an investigation regarding Vox's financing, following a complaint lodged in December by the PSOE. The investigation concerns alleged illegal donations of 4.6 million euros from Hungary. The complaint is based on a report by the Court of Auditors, which found 1.8 million unjustified euros accounted for as promotional sales, as well as an electoral credit of 6.5 million euros granted by the Hungarian bank MBH during the 2023 general election. On 16 June 2025, Spanish Anti-Corruption Prosecutor's Office provisionally shelved the investigation into Vox over alleged illegal financing regarding loans received from the Hungarian bank. The case was closed after prosecutors found no evidence of a criminal offense and verified that the political party has already fully repaid the money. On 5 June 2026, the Supreme Court ruled that the Court of Auditors' resolution lacked a solid evidentiary basis. The high court reproached the supervisory body for an unorthodox interpretation of the law by equating the sale of campaign items with prohibited donations, pointing out that no plan to hide financing was proven.

== See also ==
- History of the far-right in Spain
- Sociological Francoism

== Bibliography ==
- Arroyo Menéndez, Millán (2020). "Las causas del apoyo electoral a VOX en españa". Política y Sociedad. 57 (3). Madrid: 693–717. doi:10.5209/poso.69206. S2CID 241063503.
- Carmona Pascual, Pablo (2020). "Vox y el dilema de las derechas". Familia, raza y nación en tiempos de posfascismo (PDF). Traficantes de Sueños. pp. 161–186. ISBN 978-84-121259-4-8.
- Casals, Xavier (2020). "El ultranacionalismo de Vox. Cinco claves para comprender 'la España viva'". Grand Place. Pensamiento y Cultura. 13. Zarautz: Mario Onaindia Fundazioa: 27–35. ISSN 2386-429X.
- Esteban Fernández, Nacho (2023). Por rojos y maricones: homofobia y transfobia en el Partido Popular y el resto de la derecha española. Egales. 104-134. ISBN 978-84-19728-03-6.
- Ferreira, Carles (2019). "Vox como representante de la derecha radical en España: un estudio sobre su ideología" [Vox as Representative of the Radical Right in Spain: A study of its Ideology]. Revista Española de Ciencia Política (in Spanish). 51 (51): 73–98. doi:10.21308/recp.51.03. ISSN 2173-9870.
- Mendes, Mariana; Dennison, James (2021). "Explaining the emergence of the radical right in Spain and Portugal: Salience, Stigma and Supply". West European Politics. 44 (4): 752–775. doi:10.1080/01402382.2020.1777504. hdl:1814/62226.
- Lebourg, Nicolas; Camus, Jean-Yves (2020). Las extremas derechas en Europa. Editorial Clave Intelectual. 344. ISBN 978-84-122800-2-9.
- Turnbull-Dugarte, Stuart J. (2019). "Explaining the end of Spanish exceptionalism and electoral support for Vox". Research & Politics. 6 (2) 2053168019851680. SAGE. doi:10.1177/2053168019851680.
- Turnbull-Dugarte, Stuart; Rama, José; Santana, Andrés (2020). "The Baskerville's dog suddenly started barking: voting for VOX in the 2019 Spanish general elections". Political Research Exchange. 2 (1). doi:10.1080/2474736X.2020.1781543.
- Jones, Erik; Hedberg, Masha (2023). Europe Today: A Twenty-First Century Introduction. Rowman & Littlefield Publishers. 508. ISBN 978-1-5381-1094-2.
- Gray, Caroline (2020). Territorial Politics and the Party System in Spain: Continuity and change since the financial crisis. Routledge. 182. ISBN 978-1-000-06258-8.
- Sweeney, Simon (2023). European Union in the Global Context. Taylor & Francis. 502. ISBN 978-1-315-29435-3.
- Buck, Tobias (2019). After the Fall: Crisis, Recovery and the Making of a New Spain. Hachette UK. 320. ISBN 978-1-4746-1009-4.
