= Montserrat Garriga Cabrero =

Cuban-Spanish botanist (1865-1956)

Montserrat Garriga Cabrero (1865–1956) was a Cuban-Spanish botanist.

She was born in Cienfuegos, Cuba, but moved to Catalonia with her family when she was a child. She collected plants from around the world, especially alpine flora, and collaborated closely with botany professor Pius Font i Quer (1888–1964).
