= Joseph Napoléon Sébastien Sarda Garriga =

French abolitionist

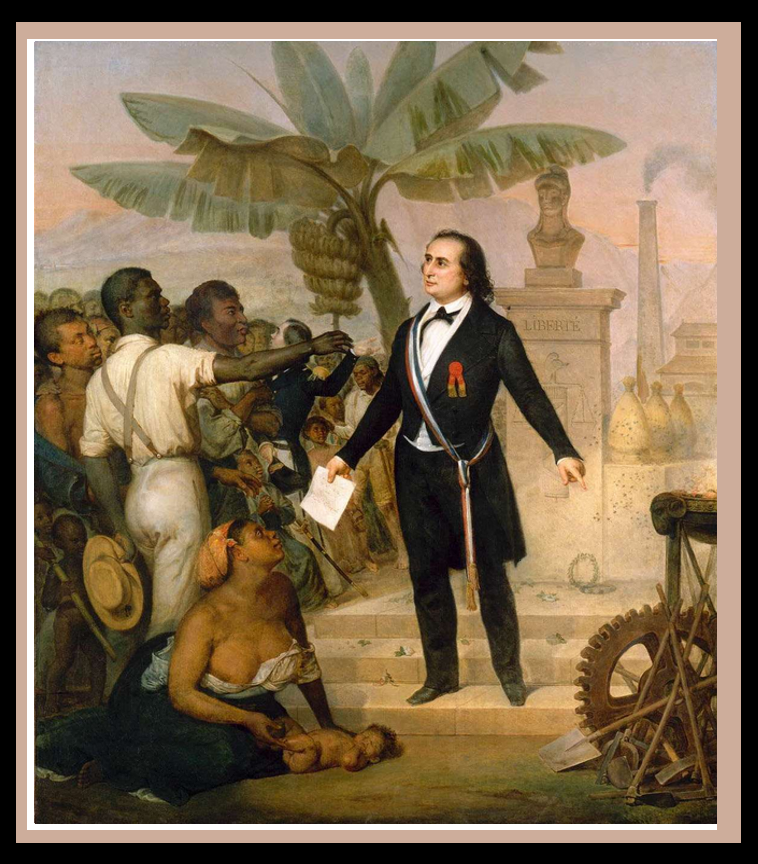
1848 Depiction of Sarda Garriga

Joseph Napoléon Sébastien Sarda Garriga (13 December 1808–8 September 1877) was a French civil servant who led the abolition of slavery in Reunion in 1848.
