= José Luis González Quirós =

Spanish philosopher (born 1947)

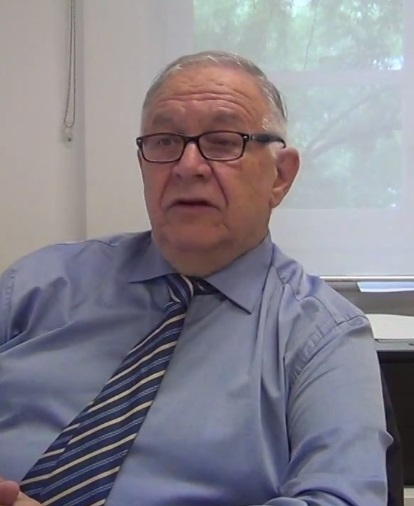
José Luis González Quirós (2014)

José Luis González Quirós (born September 2, 1947) is a Spanish philosopher, born in Grado, Asturias. He is one of the founders of Vox, and was interim president of Vox from June to September 2014.
