= Joan Garriga Bacardí =

Spanish psychotherapist

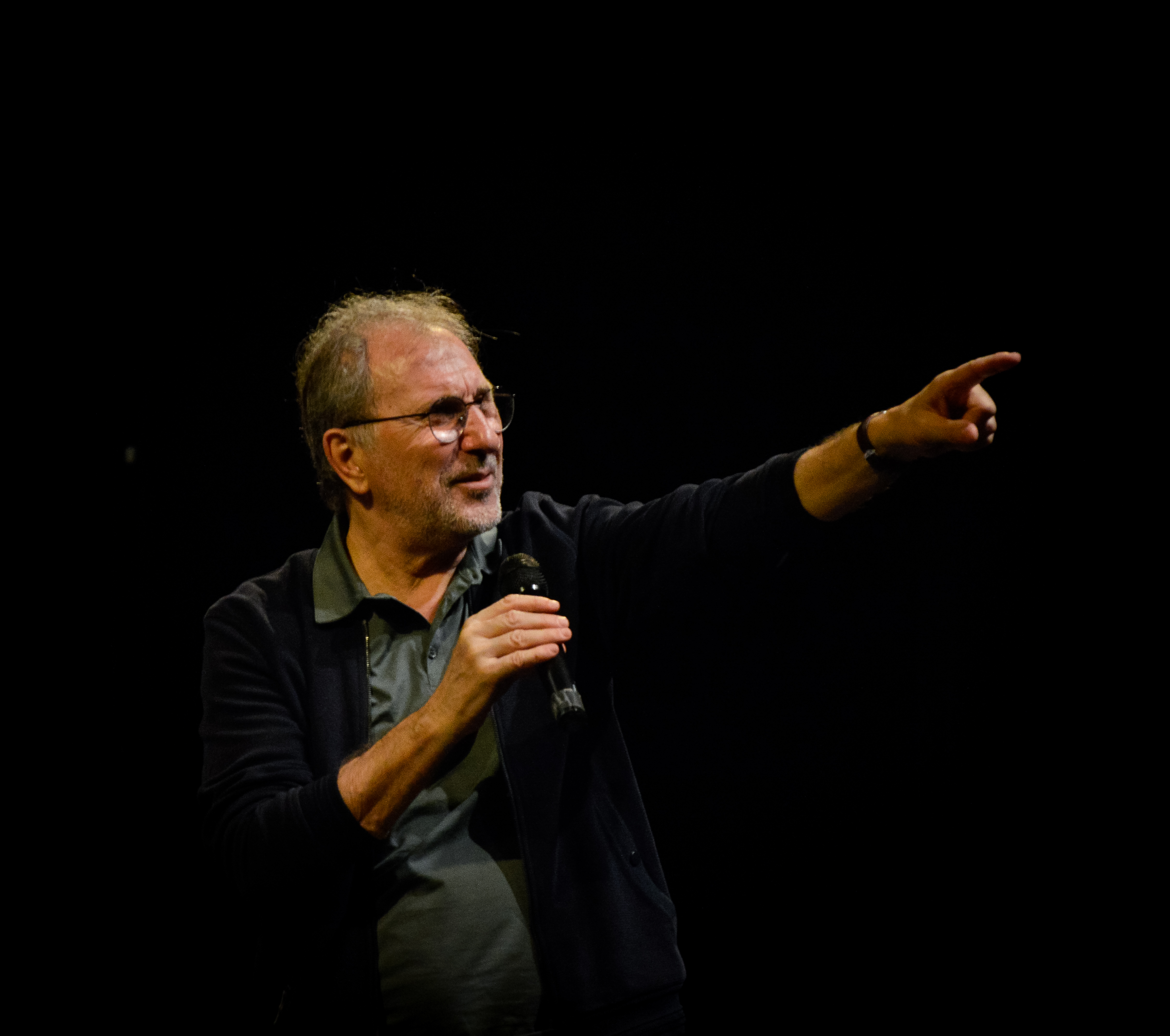
- Born: 28 November 1957 (age 68); Bellpuig, Lleida, Catalonia
- Other name: Joan Garriga
- Citizenship: Spain
- Education: University of Barcelona - Psychology
- Occupations: psychotherapist, lecturer, writer
- Years active: 1988 - present
- Website: https://joangarriga.com

Joan Garriga Bacardí (Bellpuig, Lleida, 28 November 1957) is a Gestalt and humanistic psychologist and psychotherapist. Bacardí is known for the use of the Family Constellations approach, classified under paranormal and deemed to be pseudoscientific by anti-pseudoscience campaigner Tomasz Witkowski.

He has published books on parenting and parent-child relationship, couple relationship, transgenerational roots and influences, spirituality, philosophy for a fulfilled life and the art of living well, the process of transformation and the approach of family constellations.

== Biography ==
Joan Garriga was born on 28 November 1957 in Bellpuig, in the province of Lleida in Catalonia, Spain.

He attended University of Barcelona to study Law. After three years of studies a crisis of vocation led him away from Law and into Art, especially theatre and creativity.

Later he began to study Psychology at the same University of Barcelona, where he was certified as a clinical psychologist.

== Professional career ==
Further studies in the field of Psychology led him to create the "Institut Gestalt" of Barcelona in 1985, together with Mireia Darder and Vicens Olivé. At this institution he worked for many years as a psychotherapist, team builder, trainer and supervisor in Gestalt therapy, Neurolinguistic Programming and body-based approaches. He left the "Institut Gestalt" as a partner, but continues to collaborate as a professional.

He has collaborated with theatre and film directors, using constellations as a tool to explore the subtleties of plots, characters and performance alignment - for many years collaborated at Juan Carlos Corazza's school - "Estudio Corazza para la Actuación".

He collaborated as a teacher, supervisor and therapist in the programmes run by Claudio Naranjo in different countries.

His approach to accompanying people is psychological as well as spiritual, a theme that is extensively developed in his book ‘Vivir en el alma”.

One of his special' topics is couple relationships, about which published the books "El buen amor en la pareja" (also published in English) and "Bailando juntos"

He is active and organises workshops in Spain and in different parts of Europe and America

== Published works ==
=== Books ===
Garriga, Joan (2006) ¿Donde están las monedas? El vínculo logrado entre hijos y padres. Ed. Rigden-Institut Gestalt (also published in English)

Garriga, Joan (2008). Vivir en el alma. Amar lo que es, amar lo que somos y amar a los que son. Ed. Rigden Institut Gestalt

Garriga, Joan (2013). El buen amor en la pareja. Cuando uno y uno suman más que dos. Ed. Destino (also published in English

Garriga, Joan (2014). La llave de la buena vida. Saber ganar sin perderse a uno mismo y saber perder ganándose a uno mismo. Ed. Destino

Garriga, Joan (2020). Bailando juntos. La cara oculta del amor en la pareja y la familia. Ed. Destino

Garriga, Joan (2021). Decir sí a la vida. Ganar fortaleza y abandonar el sufrimiento. Ed. Destino

Garriga, Joan (2024). Constelar la vida. Del amor ciego al amor lúcido. Ed. Destino

=== Chapters in book ===
Garriga, Joan (2002). Joan Garriga describe su manera de hacer gestalt. In Naranjo, C. (Ed.) Gestalt de vanguardia (pp. 259– 274). Ediciones La Llave

Garriga, Joan (2002). Joan Garriga a propósito de las constelaciones en la gestalt. In Naranjo, C. (Ed.) Gestalt de vanguardia (pp. 275–290). Ediciones La Llave
