= Home range =

Area in which an animal lives and moves

Simple schema of four bird nests (in black), their defended territories (red), and their partly overlapping home ranges (green)

A home range is the area in which an animal lives and moves on a periodic basis. It is related to the concept of an animal's territory, which the animal consistently defends. The concept of a home range was introduced by W. H. Burt in 1943. He drew maps showing where the animal had been observed at different times. An associated concept is the utilization distribution which examines where the animal is likely to be at any given time. Data for mapping a home range used to be gathered by careful observation, but in more recent years, the animal is fitted with a transmission collar or similar GPS device.

The simplest way of measuring the home range is to construct the smallest possible convex polygon around the data but this tends to overestimate the range. The best known methods for constructing utilization distributions are the so-called bivariate Gaussian or normal distribution kernel density methods. More recently, nonparametric methods such as the Burgman and Fox's alpha-hull and Getz and Wilmers local convex hull have been used. Software is available for using both parametric and nonparametric kernel methods.

== History ==
The concept of the home range can be traced back to a publication in 1943 by W. H. Burt, who constructed maps delineating the spatial extent or outside boundary of an animal's movement during the course of its everyday activities. Associated with the concept of a home range is the concept of a utilization distribution, which takes the form of a two dimensional probability density function that represents the probability of finding an animal in a defined area within its home range. The home range of an individual animal is typically constructed from a set of location points that have been collected over a period of time, identifying the position in space of an individual at many points in time. Such data are now collected automatically using collars placed on individuals that transmit through satellites or using mobile cellphone technology and global positioning systems (GPS) technology, at regular intervals.

== Methods of calculation ==
The simplest way to draw the boundaries of a home range from a set of location data is to construct the smallest possible convex polygon around the data. This approach is referred to as the minimum convex polygon (MCP) method which is still widely employed, but has many drawbacks including often overestimating the size of home ranges.

The best known methods for constructing utilization distributions are the so-called bivariate Gaussian or normal distribution kernel density methods. This group of methods is part of a more general group of parametric kernel methods that employ distributions other than the normal distribution as the kernel elements associated with each point in the set of location data.

Recently, the kernel approach to constructing utilization distributions was extended to include a number of nonparametric methods such as the Burgman and Fox's alpha-hull method and Getz and Wilmers local convex hull (LoCoH) method. This latter method has now been extended from a purely fixed-point LoCoH method to fixed radius and adaptive point/radius LoCoH methods.

Although, currently, more software is available to implement parametric than nonparametric methods (because the latter approach is newer), the cited papers by Getz et al. demonstrate that LoCoH methods generally provide more accurate estimates of home range sizes and have better convergence properties as sample size increases than parametric kernel methods.

Home range estimation methods that have been developed since 2005 include:

- LoCoH
- Brownian Bridge
- Line-based Kernel
- GeoEllipse
- Line-Buffer

Computer packages for using parametric and nonparametric kernel methods are available online. In the appendix of a 2017 JMIR article, the home ranges for over 150 different bird species in Manitoba are reported.

== See also ==
- Territoriality
- Dear enemy recognition
