= Utilization distribution =

A utilization distribution is a probability distribution giving the probability density that an animal is found at a given point in space. It is estimated from data sampling the location of an individual or individuals in space over a period of time using, for example, telemetry or GPS based methods.

Estimation of utilization distribution was traditionally based on histograms but newer nonparametric methods based on Fourier transformations, kernel density and local convex hull methods have been developed.

The typical application for this distribution is estimating the home range distribution of animals. According to Lichti & Swihart (2011), kernel density methods provided, in many cases, less biased home-range area estimates compared to convex hull methods.

== See also ==
- Home range
- Local convex hull
