= Rug plot =

One-dimensional data visualization

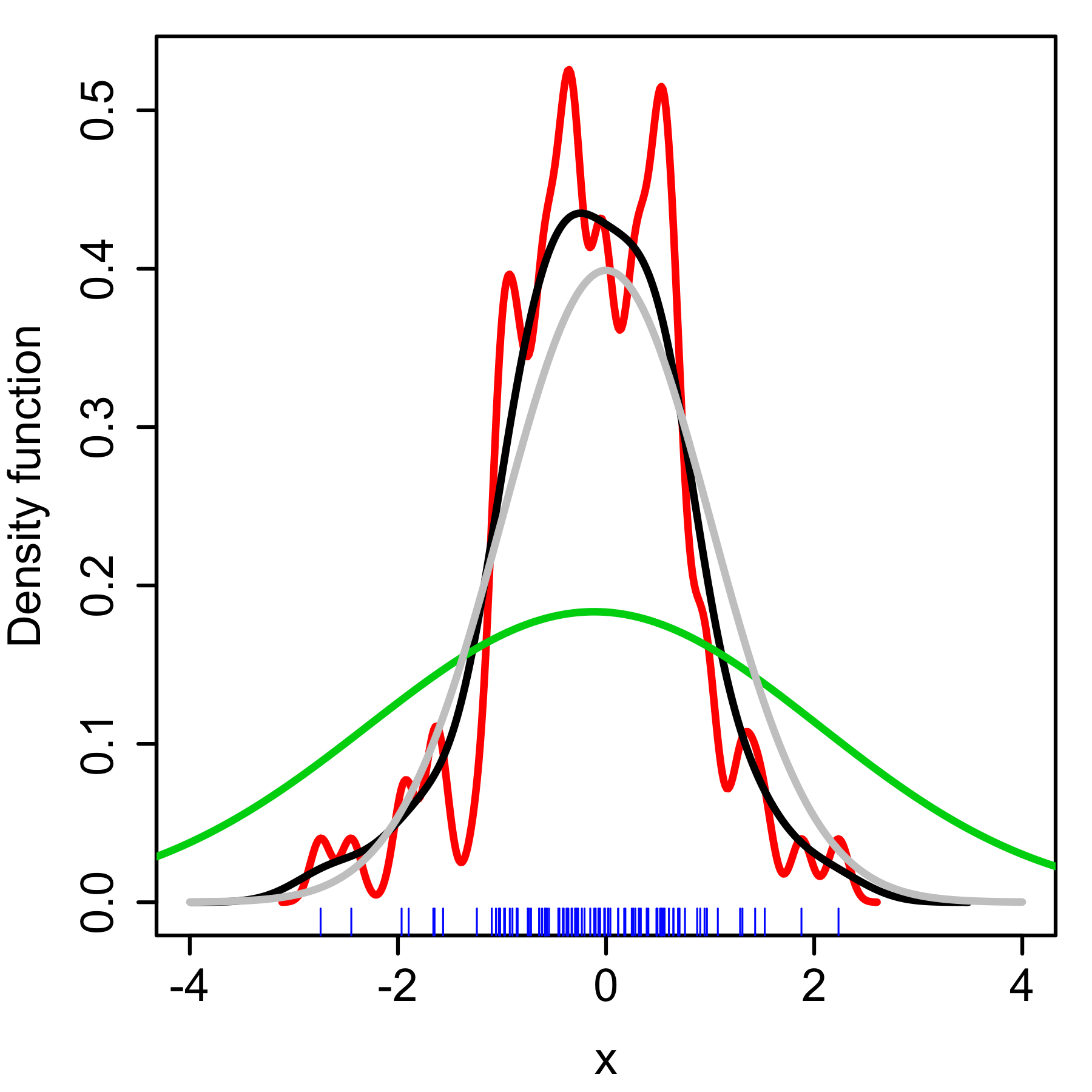
A rug plot of 100 data points appears in blue along the x-axis. (The points are sampled from the normal distribution shown in gray. The other curves show various kernel density estimates of the data.)

A rug plot is a plot of data for a single quantitative variable, displayed as marks along an axis. It is used to visualise the distribution of the data. As such it is analogous to a histogram with zero-width bins, or a one-dimensional scatter plot.

Rug plots are often used in combination with two-dimensional scatter plots by placing a rug plot of the x values of the data along the x-axis, and similarly for the y values. This is the origin of the term "rug plot", as these rug plots with perpendicular markers look like tassels along the edges of the rectangular "rug" of the scatter plot.
