= Murray Rosenblatt =

American statistician (1926–2019)

Murray Rosenblatt (September 7, 1926 – October 9, 2019) was a statistician specializing in time series analysis who was a professor of mathematics at the University of California, San Diego. He received his Ph.D. at Cornell University. He was also a recipient of a Guggenheim Fellowship, in 1965, and was a member of the National Academy of Sciences. He wrote about 140 research articles, 4 books, and co-edited 6 books.

== Education and career ==
Rosenblatt was born in New York City and went to City College of New York. He completed his PhD in 1949 under the direction of Mark Kac at Cornell University. He became an instructor/assistant professor in the Committee of Statistics at the University of Chicago. He was at the Indiana University, and Brown University before his joining the University of California at San Diego in 1964. He became well known for his contributions on time series and Markov processes. He conducted seminal work on density estimation, central limit theorems under strong mixing, spectral domain methods and long memory processes.

== Awards and honors ==
In addition to being a fellow of the Institute of Mathematical Statistics and American Association for the Advancement of Science, he was a Guggenheim fellow (1965–1966, 1971–1972) and was elected to the National Academy of Sciences in 1984. In 2013 he became a fellow of the American Mathematical Society, for "contributions to probability and statistics".

== Death ==
Rosenblatt died on October 9, 2019.

== Books ==
- Rosenblatt, M. Errett Bishop: Reflections on Him and His Researches on Foundations and Function Algebras. American Mathematical Society. ISBN 0-8218-5040-7
- Rosenblatt, M. Gaussian and Non-Gaussian Linear Time Series and Random Fields. Springer Verlag. ISBN 0-387-98917-X.
- Rosenblatt, M. Markov Processes: Structure and Asymptotic Behavior Springer Verlag. ISBN 0-387-05480-4.
- Brillinger D. R., Caines P., Geweke J., Rosenblatt M., Taqqu M. S. New Directions in Time Series Analysis. Springer, ISBN 0-387-97896-8.
- Rosenblatt, M. Random Processes (Graduate Texts in Mathematics) Springer Verlag, ISBN 0-387-90085-3.
- Rosenblatt, M. Stationary Sequences and Random Fields Birkhauser, ISBN 0-8176-3264-6.
- Grenander Ulf, Rosenblatt M. Statistical Analysis of Stationary Time Series American Mathematical Society, ISBN 0-8284-0320-1.
- Rosenblatt, M. Stochastic Curve Estimation Institute of Mathematical Statistic, ISBN 0-940600-22-6.
- Rosenblatt, M. Studies in Probability Theory Mathematical Association of America, ISBN 0-88385-118-0.
