= Mean integrated squared error =

In statistics, the mean integrated squared error (MISE) is used in density estimation. The MISE of an estimate of an unknown probability density is given by

$$\operatorname{E}\|f_n-f\|_2^2=\operatorname{E}\int (f_n(x)-f(x))^2 \, dx$$

where ƒ is the unknown density, ƒ_{n} is its estimate based on a sample of n independent and identically distributed random variables. Here, E denotes the expected value with respect to that sample.

The MISE is also known as L^{2} risk function.

== See also ==
- Minimum distance estimation
- Mean squared error
