= List of political parties in Ceuta =

This article lists political parties in Ceuta.

== The parties ==
Most of the Spanish political parties are active in Ceuta. In addition are the following regional parties:

- Ceutan Democratic Union (Unión Demócrata Ceutí)
- Ceuta Ya!
- Democratic and Social Party of Ceuta (Partido Democrático y Social de Ceuta)
- Movement for Dignity and Citizenship
- People's Party of Ceuta
- Podemos Ceuta
- Socialist Party of the People of Ceuta (Partido Socialista del Pueblo de Ceuta)
- Union of Muslims of Ceuta (Unión de Musulmanes de Ceuta)

=== Former parties ===
- Andalusian Regional Union
- Caballas Coalition
- Ceuta Nationalist Party (Partido Nacionalista Ceutí)
- Progress and Future of Ceuta
- United Ceuta

== See also ==
- List of political parties in Melilla
- List of political parties in Spain
