= Results of the 1993 Spanish Congress election =

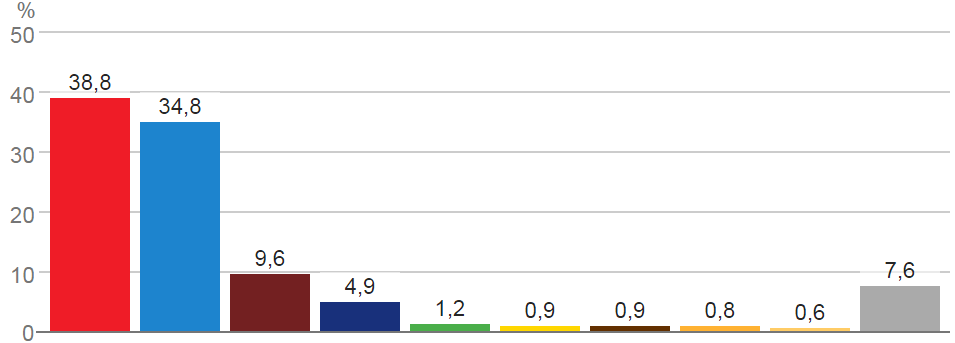
| (Spain) | Main: 1993 Spanish general election |
← 1989 6 June 1993 1996 →
| Party | | Votes | % | Seats |
| | PSOE | 9,150,083 | 38.8% | 159 |
| | PP | 8,201,463 | 34.8% | 141 |
| | IU | 2,253,722 | 9.6% | 18 |
| | CiU | 1,165,783 | 4.9% | 17 |
| | EAJ/PNV | 291,448 | 1.2% | 5 |
| | CC | 207,077 | 0.9% | 4 |
| | HB | 206,876 | 0.9% | 2 |
| | ERC | 189,632 | 0.8% | 1 |
| | PAR | 144,544 | 0.6% | 1 |
| | Others | 1,781,236 | 7.6% | 2 |
| Total | | 23,591,864 | 100.0% | 350 |

This article presents the results breakdown of the election to the Congress of Deputies held in Spain on 6 June 1993. The following tables show detailed results in each of the country's 17 autonomous communities and in the autonomous cities of Ceuta and Melilla, as well as a summary of constituency and regional results. (Note: The autonomous cities of Ceuta and Melilla would not be constituted as independent administrative entities until 1995.)

== Nationwide ==
← Summary of the 6 June 1993 Congress of Deputies election results →
| Parties and alliances | Popular vote | | | Seats | |
| Parties and alliances | Votes | % | ±pp | Total | +/− |
|---|---|---|---|---|---|
| Spanish Socialist Workers' Party (PSOE)^{1} | 9,150,083 | 38.78 | −1.33 | 159 | −18 |
| People's Party (PP) | 8,201,463 | 34.76 | +8.97 | 141 | +34 |
| United Left (IU) | 2,253,722 | 9.55 | +0.48 | 18 | +1 |
| Convergence and Union (CiU) | 1,165,783 | 4.94 | −0.10 | 17 | −1 |
| Democratic and Social Centre (CDS) | 414,740 | 1.76 | −6.13 | 0 | −14 |
| Basque Nationalist Party (EAJ/PNV) | 291,448 | 1.24 | ±0.00 | 5 | ±0 |
| Canarian Coalition (CC)^{2} | 207,077 | 0.88 | +0.45 | 4 | +3 |
| Popular Unity (HB) | 206,876 | 0.88 | −0.18 | 2 | −2 |
| Republican Left of Catalonia (ERC) | 189,632 | 0.80 | +0.39 | 1 | +1 |
| The Greens (Verdes)^{3} | 185,940 | 0.79 | −0.11 | 0 | ±0 |
| Aragonese Party (PAR) | 144,544 | 0.61 | +0.26 | 1 | ±0 |
| Basque Solidarity–Basque Left (EA–EuE) | 129,293 | 0.55 | −0.12 | 1 | −1 |
| Galician Nationalist Bloc (BNG) | 126,965 | 0.54 | +0.31 | 0 | ±0 |
| Valencian Union (UV) | 112,341 | 0.48 | −0.23 | 1 | −1 |
| Andalusian Party (PA) | 96,513 | 0.41 | −0.63 | 0 | −2 |
| The Ecologists (LE) | 68,851 | 0.29 | −0.38 | 0 | ±0 |
| Ruiz-Mateos Group–European Democratic Alliance (ARM–ADE) | 54,518 | 0.23 | −0.84 | 0 | ±0 |
| Andalusian Progress Party (PAP) | 43,169 | 0.18 | New | 0 | ±0 |
| Valencian People's Union (UPV) | 41,052 | 0.17 | −0.03 | 0 | ±0 |
| Workers' Socialist Party (PST) | 30,068 | 0.13 | −0.27 | 0 | ±0 |
| Union for the Progress of Cantabria (UPCA) | 27,005 | 0.11 | New | 0 | ±0 |
| Nationalists of the Balearic Islands (PSM–ENE) | 20,118 | 0.09 | +0.05 | 0 | ±0 |
| Regionalist Party of Cantabria (PRC) | 18,608 | 0.08 | New | 0 | ±0 |
| Alavese Unity (UA) | 16,623 | 0.07 | New | 0 | ±0 |
| Liberal Independent Group (GIL) | 16,452 | 0.07 | New | 0 | ±0 |
| Party of Gran Canaria (PGC) | 15,246 | 0.06 | New | 0 | ±0 |
| Leonese People's Union (UPL) | 13,097 | 0.06 | New | 0 | ±0 |
| Natural Law Party (PLN) | 11,392 | 0.05 | New | 0 | ±0 |
| Asturianist Party (PAS) | 11,088 | 0.05 | +0.02 | 0 | ±0 |
| United Extremadura (EU) | 10,653 | 0.05 | ±0.00 | 0 | ±0 |
| Communist Party of the Peoples of Spain (PCPE) | 10,233 | 0.04 | −0.27 | 0 | ±0 |
| Majorcan, Menorcan and Pityusic Union (UMMP) | 10,053 | 0.04 | New | 0 | ±0 |
| Ecologist Party of Catalonia–VERDE (PEC–VERDE) | 9,249 | 0.04 | −0.06 | 0 | ±0 |
| Humanist Party (PH) | 8,834 | 0.04 | −0.04 | 0 | ±0 |
| Revolutionary Workers' Party (POR) | 8,667 | 0.04 | ±0.00 | 0 | ±0 |
| Spanish Phalanx of the CNSO (FE–JONS) | 8,000 | 0.03 | −0.09 | 0 | ±0 |
| Coalition for a New Socialist Party (CNPS)^{4} | 7,991 | 0.03 | −0.03 | 0 | ±0 |
| Riojan Party (PR) | 7,532 | 0.03 | New | 0 | ±0 |
| Aragonese Union (CHA) | 6,344 | 0.03 | +0.01 | 0 | ±0 |
| Galician Nationalist Convergence (CNG) | 4,663 | 0.02 | New | 0 | ±0 |
| Commoners' Land–Castilian Nationalist Party (TC–PNC) | 4,647 | 0.02 | New | 0 | ±0 |
| Galician Alternative (AG) | 3,286 | 0.01 | New | 0 | ±0 |
| Spanish Democratic Republican Action (ARDE) | 3,063 | 0.01 | +0.01 | 0 | ±0 |
| Regionalist Unity of Castile and León (URCL) | 2,715 | 0.01 | New | 0 | ±0 |
| Party of El Bierzo (PB) | 2,681 | 0.01 | New | 0 | ±0 |
| Extremaduran Regionalist Party (PREx) | 2,086 | 0.01 | New | 0 | ±0 |
| Health and Ecology in Solidarity (SEES) | 1,959 | 0.01 | New | 0 | ±0 |
| Madrilenian Independent Regional Party (PRIM)^{5} | 1,917 | 0.01 | −0.01 | 0 | ±0 |
| Gray Panthers of Spain (ACI) | 1,644 | 0.01 | New | 0 | ±0 |
| Valencian Nationalist Left (ENV) | 1,517 | 0.01 | ±0.00 | 0 | ±0 |
| Independent Spanish Phalanx (FEI) | 1,415 | 0.01 | +0.01 | 0 | ±0 |
| People's Palentine Group (APP) | 1,410 | 0.01 | New | 0 | ±0 |
| Rainbow (Arcoiris) | 1,407 | 0.01 | New | 0 | ±0 |
| The Greens of the Alicantine Country (PVPA) | 1,375 | 0.01 | New | 0 | ±0 |
| Cantonal Party (PCAN) | 1,300 | 0.01 | New | 0 | ±0 |
| Regionalist Party of the Leonese Country (PREPAL) | 1,193 | 0.01 | ±0.00 | 0 | ±0 |
| Spanish Catholic Movement (MCE) | 1,178 | 0.00 | New | 0 | ±0 |
| Tenerife Assembly (ATF) | 1,159 | 0.00 | New | 0 | ±0 |
| Socialist Party of the People of Ceuta (PSPC) | 1,155 | 0.00 | New | 0 | ±0 |
| Insular Group of Gran Canaria (AIGRANC) | 1,009 | 0.00 | New | 0 | ±0 |
| Castilianist Union (UC) | 949 | 0.00 | New | 0 | ±0 |
| Andecha Astur (AA) | 787 | 0.00 | New | 0 | ±0 |
| Authentic Spanish Phalanx (FEA) | 747 | 0.00 | New | 0 | ±0 |
| Alicantine Democratic Union (UniDA) | 715 | 0.00 | New | 0 | ±0 |
| Progressive Front of Spain (FPE) | 641 | 0.00 | New | 0 | ±0 |
| Union of Autonomies (UDLA) | 594 | 0.00 | New | 0 | ±0 |
| Socialist October (OS) | 540 | 0.00 | New | 0 | ±0 |
| Independent Council of Asturias (Conceyu) | 528 | 0.00 | New | 0 | ±0 |
| Integration Party for Almeria and its Peoples (PIAP) | 466 | 0.00 | New | 0 | ±0 |
| Spanish Balearic Alternative (ABE) | 416 | 0.00 | New | 0 | ±0 |
| Referendum Tolerant Independent Political Party (PITRCG) | 408 | 0.00 | New | 0 | ±0 |
| Party of The People (LG) | 385 | 0.00 | New | 0 | ±0 |
| Nationalist Party of Cantabria (PNC) | 383 | 0.00 | New | 0 | ±0 |
| Federated Independents of Aragon (IF) | 303 | 0.00 | New | 0 | ±0 |
| Radical Balearic Party (PRB) | 282 | 0.00 | New | 0 | ±0 |
| Tagoror Party (Tagoror) | 278 | 0.00 | ±0.00 | 0 | ±0 |
| Regionalist Party of Guadalajara (PRGU) | 267 | 0.00 | ±0.00 | 0 | ±0 |
| Social Democratic Spanish Christian Monarchy (MCES) | 244 | 0.00 | New | 0 | ±0 |
| Progressive Sorian Union (US) | 98 | 0.00 | New | 0 | ±0 |
| Nationalist Party of Castile and León (PANCAL) | 70 | 0.00 | −0.01 | 0 | ±0 |
| Initiative for Ceuta (INCE) | 42 | 0.00 | New | 0 | ±0 |
| Communist Unification of Spain (UCE) | 0 | 0.00 | New | 0 | ±0 |
| Coalition for Free Canaries (CCL) | 0 | 0.00 | New | 0 | ±0 |
| Centrist Unity–Democratic Spanish Party (PED) | 0 | 0.00 | −0.02 | 0 | ±0 |
| Freixes Independent Group (Freixes) | 0 | 0.00 | New | 0 | ±0 |
| Blank ballots | 188,679 | 0.80 | +0.11 | | |
| Total | 23,591,864 | | | 350 | ±0 |
| Valid votes | 23,591,864 | 99.46 | +0.20 | | |
| Invalid votes | 126,952 | 0.54 | −0.20 | | |
| Votes cast / turnout | 23,718,816 | 76.44 | +6.70 | | |
| Abstentions | 7,311,695 | 23.56 | −6.70 | | |
| Registered voters | 31,030,511 | | | | |
Sources
Footnotes: ^{1} Spanish Socialist Workers' Party results are compared to the combined totals of Spanish Socialist Workers' Party and Basque Country Left in the 1989 election.; ^{2} Canarian Coalition results are compared to Canarian Independent Groups totals in the 1989 election.; ^{3} The Greens results are compared to the combined totals of Green List and Green Alternative–Ecologist Movement of Catalonia in the 1989 election.; ^{4} Coalition for a New Socialist Party results are compared to Alliance for the Republic totals in the 1989 election.; ^{5} Madrilenian Independent Regional Party results are compared to Regional Party of Madrid totals in the 1989 election.

== Summary ==
=== Constituencies ===

Summary of constituency results in the 6 June 1993 Congress of Deputies election
| Constituency | PSOE | | PP | | IU | | CiU | | PNV | | CC | | HB | | ERC | | PAR | | EA–EuE | | UV | |
| Constituency | % | S | % | S | % | S | % | S | % | S | % | S | % | S | % | S | % | S | % | S | % | S |
|---|---|---|---|---|---|---|---|---|---|---|---|---|---|---|---|---|---|---|---|---|---|---|
| Álava | 26.1 | 2 | 19.6 | 1 | 6.9 | − | | | 16.8 | 1 | | | 9.4 | − | | | | | 5.8 | − | | |
| Albacete | 46.1 | 2 | 40.5 | 2 | 9.3 | − | | | | | | | | | | | | | | | | |
| Alicante | 39.9 | 4 | 43.5 | 5 | 10.3 | 1 | | | | | | | | | | | | | | | 0.6 | − |
| Almería | 47.9 | 3 | 37.3 | 2 | 9.5 | − | | | | | | | | | | | | | | | | |
| Asturias | 39.3 | 4 | 37.4 | 4 | 15.4 | 1 | | | | | | | | | | | | | | | | |
| Ávila | 30.5 | 1 | 50.2 | 2 | 5.5 | − | | | | | | | | | | | | | | | | |
| Badajoz | 51.9 | 4 | 35.1 | 2 | 9.0 | − | | | | | | | | | | | | | | | | |
| Balearics | 34.0 | 3 | 46.4 | 4 | 6.0 | − | | | | | | | | | 0.7 | − | | | | | | |
| Barcelona | 36.4 | 12 | 17.0 | 6 | 8.5 | 3 | 30.1 | 10 | | | | | | | 4.3 | 1 | | | | | | |
| Biscay | 24.9 | 3 | 15.3 | 2 | 7.0 | − | | | 29.5 | 3 | | | 12.5 | 1 | | | | | 6.3 | − | | |
| Burgos | 34.2 | 2 | 49.6 | 2 | 9.0 | − | | | | | | | | | | | | | | | | |
| Cáceres | 50.8 | 3 | 36.9 | 2 | 6.0 | − | | | | | | | | | | | | | | | | |
| Cádiz | 50.0 | 5 | 27.7 | 3 | 11.0 | 1 | | | | | | | | | | | | | | | | |
| Cantabria | 37.2 | 3 | 37.0 | 2 | 7.4 | − | | | | | | | | | | | | | | | | |
| Castellón | 39.6 | 2 | 44.9 | 3 | 7.0 | − | | | | | | | | | | | | | | | 1.7 | − |
| Ceuta | 40.6 | − | 50.9 | 1 | | | | | | | | | | | | | | | | | | |
| Ciudad Real | 49.0 | 3 | 39.8 | 2 | 7.3 | − | | | | | | | | | | | | | | | | |
| Córdoba | 49.2 | 4 | 27.6 | 2 | 17.3 | 1 | | | | | | | | | | | | | | | | |
| Cuenca | 43.6 | 1 | 47.0 | 2 | 5.1 | − | | | | | | | | | | | | | | | | |
| Girona | 28.1 | 2 | 13.0 | − | 3.5 | − | 42.9 | 3 | | | | | | | 9.1 | − | | | | | | |
| Granada | 49.4 | 4 | 34.6 | 3 | 10.9 | − | | | | | | | | | | | | | | | | |
| Guadalajara | 36.6 | 1 | 48.8 | 2 | 9.2 | − | | | | | | | | | | | | | | | | |
| Guipúzcoa | 23.2 | 2 | 11.5 | 1 | 4.8 | − | | | 17.3 | 1 | | | 20.5 | 1 | | | | | 17.9 | 1 | | |
| Huelva | 55.9 | 3 | 29.3 | 2 | 9.1 | − | | | | | | | | | | | | | | | | |
| Huesca | 38.0 | 2 | 32.3 | 1 | 7.3 | − | | | | | | | | | | | 17.8 | − | | | | |
| Jaén | 52.6 | 4 | 32.4 | 2 | 10.3 | − | | | | | | | | | | | | | | | | |
| La Coruña | 37.3 | 4 | 44.2 | 5 | 5.4 | − | | | | | | | | | | | | | | | | |
| La Rioja | 37.6 | 2 | 46.3 | 2 | 7.0 | − | | | | | | | | | | | | | | | | |
| Las Palmas | 24.8 | 2 | 38.1 | 3 | 5.3 | − | | | | | 24.5 | 2 | | | | | | | | | | |
| León | 40.4 | 2 | 44.2 | 3 | 6.7 | − | | | | | | | | | | | | | | | | |
| Lleida | 27.1 | 1 | 19.8 | 1 | 3.2 | − | 39.3 | 2 | | | | | | | 7.5 | − | | | | | | |
| Lugo | 32.2 | 2 | 53.2 | 3 | 2.7 | − | | | | | | | | | | | | | | | | |
| Madrid | 35.0 | 13 | 43.9 | 16 | 14.6 | 5 | | | | | | | | | | | | | | | | |
| Málaga | 48.0 | 6 | 31.0 | 3 | 14.1 | 1 | | | | | | | | | | | | | | | | |
| Melilla | 48.8 | 1 | 44.9 | − | 2.6 | − | | | | | | | | | | | | | | | | |
| Murcia | 38.6 | 4 | 47.3 | 4 | 9.7 | 1 | | | | | | | | | | | | | | | | |
| Navarre | 34.9 | 2 | 36.1 | 3 | 8.7 | − | | | 1.1 | − | | | 10.4 | − | | | | | 3.7 | − | | |
| Orense | 39.2 | 2 | 49.1 | 2 | 2.3 | − | | | | | | | | | | | | | | | | |
| Palencia | 38.3 | 1 | 47.6 | 2 | 6.4 | − | | | | | | | | | | | | | | | | |
| Pontevedra | 34.6 | 3 | 47.2 | 5 | 5.7 | − | | | | | | | | | | | | | | | | |
| Salamanca | 37.3 | 2 | 48.6 | 2 | 6.7 | − | | | | | | | | | | | | | | | | |
| Santa Cruz de Tenerife | 35.3 | 3 | 29.4 | 2 | 4.6 | − | | | | | 26.8 | 2 | | | | | | | | | | |
| Segovia | 32.3 | 1 | 48.0 | 2 | 7.4 | − | | | | | | | | | | | | | | | | |
| Seville | 56.0 | 8 | 26.0 | 3 | 11.7 | 1 | | | | | | | | | | | | | | | | |
| Soria | 36.8 | 1 | 50.7 | 2 | 5.6 | − | | | | | | | | | | | | | | | | |
| Tarragona | 33.1 | 3 | 19.8 | 1 | 5.1 | − | 32.0 | 2 | | | | | | | 6.6 | − | | | | | | |
| Teruel | 40.3 | 2 | 38.1 | 1 | 4.4 | − | | | | | | | | | | | 13.4 | − | | | | |
| Toledo | 44.6 | 3 | 44.4 | 2 | 7.3 | − | | | | | | | | | | | | | | | | |
| Valencia | 37.2 | 6 | 37.9 | 7 | 11.4 | 2 | | | | | | | | | | | | | | | 7.5 | 1 |
| Valladolid | 36.1 | 2 | 45.4 | 3 | 11.7 | − | | | | | | | | | | | | | | | | |
| Zamora | 39.5 | 1 | 49.5 | 2 | 4.4 | − | | | | | | | | | | | | | | | | |
| Zaragoza | 32.4 | 3 | 32.2 | 2 | 11.2 | 1 | | | | | | | | | | | 20.2 | 1 | | | | |
| Total | 38.8 | 159 | 34.8 | 141 | 9.6 | 18 | 4.9 | 17 | 1.2 | 5 | 0.9 | 4 | 0.9 | 2 | 0.8 | 1 | 0.6 | 1 | 0.5 | 1 | 0.5 | 1 |

=== Regions ===

Summary of regional results in the 6 June 1993 Congress of Deputies election
| Region | PSOE | | PP | | IU | | CiU | | PNV | | CC | | HB | | ERC | | PAR | | EA | | UV | |
| Region | % | S | % | S | % | S | % | S | % | S | % | S | % | S | % | S | % | S | % | S | % | S |
|---|---|---|---|---|---|---|---|---|---|---|---|---|---|---|---|---|---|---|---|---|---|---|
| Andalusia | 51.5 | 37 | 29.8 | 20 | 12.1 | 4 | | | | | | | | | | | | | | | | |
| Aragon | 34.3 | 7 | 32.9 | 4 | 9.7 | 1 | | | | | | | | | | | 19.0 | 1 | | | | |
| Asturias | 39.3 | 4 | 37.4 | 4 | 15.4 | 1 | | | | | | | | | | | | | | | | |
| Balearics | 34.0 | 3 | 46.4 | 4 | 6.0 | − | | | | | | | | | 0.7 | − | | | | | | |
| Basque Country | 24.5 | 7 | 14.7 | 4 | 6.3 | − | | | 24.1 | 5 | | | 14.6 | 2 | | | | | 9.8 | 1 | | |
| Canary Islands | 29.9 | 5 | 33.9 | 5 | 5.0 | − | | | | | 25.6 | 4 | | | | | | | | | | |
| Cantabria | 37.2 | 3 | 37.0 | 2 | 7.4 | − | | | | | | | | | | | | | | | | |
| Castile and León | 36.7 | 13 | 47.4 | 20 | 7.7 | − | | | | | | | | | | | | | | | | |
| Castilla–La Mancha | 45.3 | 10 | 43.0 | 10 | 7.6 | − | | | | | | | | | | | | | | | | |
| Catalonia | 34.9 | 18 | 17.0 | 8 | 7.5 | 3 | 31.8 | 17 | | | | | | | 5.1 | 1 | | | | | | |
| Ceuta | 40.6 | − | 50.9 | 1 | | | | | | | | | | | | | | | | | | |
| Extremadura | 51.5 | 7 | 35.8 | 4 | 7.8 | − | | | | | | | | | | | | | | | | |
| Galicia | 36.0 | 11 | 47.1 | 15 | 4.7 | − | | | | | | | | | | | | | | | | |
| La Rioja | 37.6 | 2 | 46.3 | 2 | 7.0 | − | | | | | | | | | | | | | | | | |
| Madrid | 35.0 | 13 | 43.9 | 16 | 14.6 | 5 | | | | | | | | | | | | | | | | |
| Melilla | 48.8 | 1 | 44.9 | − | 2.6 | − | | | | | | | | | | | | | | | | |
| Murcia | 38.6 | 4 | 47.3 | 4 | 9.7 | 1 | | | | | | | | | | | | | | | | |
| Navarre | 34.9 | 2 | 36.1 | 3 | 8.7 | − | | | 1.1 | − | | | 10.4 | − | | | | | 3.7 | − | | |
| Valencian Community | 38.3 | 12 | 40.5 | 15 | 10.5 | 3 | | | | | | | | | | | | | | | 4.6 | 1 |
| Total | 38.8 | 159 | 34.8 | 141 | 9.6 | 18 | 4.9 | 17 | 1.2 | 5 | 0.9 | 4 | 0.9 | 2 | 0.8 | 1 | 0.6 | 1 | 0.5 | 1 | 0.5 | 1 |

== Autonomous communities ==
=== Andalusia ===
← Summary of the 6 June 1993 Congress of Deputies election results in Andalusia →
| Parties and alliances | Popular vote | | | Seats | |
| Parties and alliances | Votes | % | ±pp | Total | +/− |
|---|---|---|---|---|---|
| Spanish Socialist Workers' Party of Andalusia (PSOE–A) | 2,063,899 | 51.45 | −1.10 | 37 | −5 |
| People's Party (PP) | 1,195,476 | 29.80 | +9.63 | 20 | +8 |
| United Left–Assembly for Andalusia (IU–CA) | 484,753 | 12.08 | +0.11 | 4 | −1 |
| Andalusian Party (PA) | 96,513 | 2.41 | −3.82 | 0 | −2 |
| Andalusian Progress Party (PAP) | 43,169 | 1.08 | New | 0 | ±0 |
| Democratic and Social Centre (CDS) | 34,900 | 0.87 | −3.80 | 0 | ±0 |
| The Greens of Andalusia (Verdes)^{1} | 23,372 | 0.58 | −0.07 | 0 | ±0 |
| Liberal Independent Group (GIL) | 16,452 | 0.41 | New | 0 | ±0 |
| The Ecologists (LE) | 9,789 | 0.24 | −0.22 | 0 | ±0 |
| Ruiz-Mateos Group–European Democratic Alliance (ARM–ADE) | 6,765 | 0.17 | −1.34 | 0 | ±0 |
| Communist Party of the Andalusian People (PCPA) | 5,300 | 0.13 | −0.06 | 0 | ±0 |
| Workers' Socialist Party (PST) | 2,963 | 0.07 | −0.25 | 0 | ±0 |
| Spanish Phalanx of the CNSO (FE–JONS) | 2,130 | 0.05 | −0.05 | 0 | ±0 |
| Natural Law Party (PLN) | 1,447 | 0.04 | New | 0 | ±0 |
| Humanist Party (PH) | 1,034 | 0.03 | −0.03 | 0 | ±0 |
| Coalition for a New Socialist Party (CNPS)^{2} | 935 | 0.02 | −0.04 | 0 | ±0 |
| Health and Ecology in Solidarity (SEES) | 578 | 0.01 | New | 0 | ±0 |
| Socialist October (OS) | 540 | 0.01 | New | 0 | ±0 |
| Integration Party for Almeria and its Peoples (PIAP) | 466 | 0.01 | New | 0 | ±0 |
| Independent Spanish Phalanx (FEI) | 203 | 0.01 | New | 0 | ±0 |
| Communist Unification of Spain (UCE) | 0 | 0.00 | New | 0 | ±0 |
| Blank ballots | 20,742 | 0.52 | +0.07 | | |
| Total | 4,011,426 | | | 61 | ±0 |
| Valid votes | 4,011,426 | 99.57 | +0.27 | | |
| Invalid votes | 17,412 | 0.43 | −0.27 | | |
| Votes cast / turnout | 4,028,838 | 76.20 | +6.87 | | |
| Abstentions | 1,258,648 | 23.80 | −6.87 | | |
| Registered voters | 5,287,486 | | | | |
Sources
Footnotes: ^{1} The Greens results are compared to The Greens–Green List totals in the 1989 election.; ^{2} Coalition for a New Socialist Party results are compared to Alliance for the Republic totals in the 1989 election.

=== Aragon ===
← Summary of the 6 June 1993 Congress of Deputies election results in Aragon →
| Parties and alliances | Popular vote | | | Seats | |
| Parties and alliances | Votes | % | ±pp | Total | +/− |
|---|---|---|---|---|---|
| Spanish Socialist Workers' Party (PSOE) | 261,108 | 34.33 | −4.39 | 7 | ±0 |
| People's Party (PP) | 250,105 | 32.88 | +5.07 | 4 | ±0 |
| Aragonese Party (PAR) | 144,544 | 19.00 | +8.12 | 1 | ±0 |
| United Left of Aragon (IU) | 73,820 | 9.71 | −0.03 | 1 | ±0 |
| Democratic and Social Centre (CDS) | 10,249 | 1.35 | −6.26 | 0 | ±0 |
| Aragonese Union (CHA) | 6,344 | 0.83 | +0.35 | 0 | ±0 |
| The Greens (Verdes)^{1} | 2,808 | 0.37 | −0.08 | 0 | ±0 |
| Workers' Socialist Party (PST) | 1,692 | 0.22 | −0.39 | 0 | ±0 |
| Ruiz-Mateos Group–Independent Party–Social Movement (ARM–PAI–MAS) | 1,349 | 0.18 | −0.86 | 0 | ±0 |
| The Ecologists (LE) | 940 | 0.12 | −0.60 | 0 | ±0 |
| Natural Law Party (PLN) | 545 | 0.07 | New | 0 | ±0 |
| Revolutionary Workers' Party (POR) | 438 | 0.06 | New | 0 | ±0 |
| Health and Ecology in Solidarity (SEES) | 418 | 0.05 | New | 0 | ±0 |
| Federated Independents of Aragon (IF) | 303 | 0.04 | New | 0 | ±0 |
| Coalition for a New Socialist Party (CNPS)^{2} | 250 | 0.03 | −0.04 | 0 | ±0 |
| Humanist Party (PH) | 195 | 0.03 | −0.05 | 0 | ±0 |
| Communist Unification of Spain (UCE) | 0 | 0.00 | New | 0 | ±0 |
| Blank ballots | 5,513 | 0.72 | −0.13 | | |
| Total | 760,621 | | | 13 | ±0 |
| Valid votes | 760,621 | 99.41 | +0.15 | | |
| Invalid votes | 4,492 | 0.59 | −0.15 | | |
| Votes cast / turnout | 765,113 | 78.16 | +7.95 | | |
| Abstentions | 213,837 | 21.84 | −7.95 | | |
| Registered voters | 978,950 | | | | |
Sources
Footnotes: ^{1} The Greens results are compared to The Greens–Green List totals in the 1989 election.; ^{2} Coalition for a New Socialist Party results are compared to Alliance for the Republic totals in the 1989 election.

=== Asturias ===
← Summary of the 6 June 1993 Congress of Deputies election results in Asturias →
| Parties and alliances | Popular vote | | | Seats | |
| Parties and alliances | Votes | % | ±pp | Total | +/− |
|---|---|---|---|---|---|
| Spanish Socialist Workers' Party (PSOE) | 271,877 | 39.32 | −1.24 | 4 | ±0 |
| People's Party (PP) | 258,355 | 37.37 | +10.84 | 4 | +1 |
| United Left (IU) | 106,757 | 15.44 | −0.14 | 1 | ±0 |
| Democratic and Social Centre (CDS) | 25,351 | 3.67 | −8.84 | 0 | −1 |
| Asturianist Party (PAS) | 11,088 | 1.60 | +1.02 | 0 | ±0 |
| The Greens (Verdes)^{1} | 4,532 | 0.66 | −0.05 | 0 | ±0 |
| Workers' Socialist Party (PST) | 2,249 | 0.33 | −0.14 | 0 | ±0 |
| The Ecologists (LE) | 1,408 | 0.20 | −0.35 | 0 | ±0 |
| Ruiz-Mateos Group–European Democratic Alliance (ARM–ADE) | 920 | 0.13 | −0.43 | 0 | ±0 |
| Andecha Astur (AA) | 787 | 0.11 | New | 0 | ±0 |
| Independent Council of Asturias (Conceyu) | 528 | 0.08 | New | 0 | ±0 |
| Spanish Phalanx of the CNSO (FE–JONS) | 355 | 0.05 | −0.07 | 0 | ±0 |
| Natural Law Party (PLN) | 261 | 0.04 | New | 0 | ±0 |
| Leonese People's Union (UPL) | 243 | 0.04 | New | 0 | ±0 |
| Coalition for a New Socialist Party (CNPS)^{2} | 186 | 0.03 | −0.05 | 0 | ±0 |
| Humanist Party (PH) | 178 | 0.03 | −0.04 | 0 | ±0 |
| Communist Unification of Spain (UCE) | 0 | 0.00 | New | 0 | ±0 |
| Blank ballots | 6,306 | 0.91 | +0.30 | | |
| Total | 691,381 | | | 9 | ±0 |
| Valid votes | 691,381 | 99.59 | +0.38 | | |
| Invalid votes | 2,862 | 0.41 | −0.38 | | |
| Votes cast / turnout | 694,243 | 75.43 | +6.53 | | |
| Abstentions | 226,147 | 24.57 | −6.53 | | |
| Registered voters | 920,390 | | | | |
Sources
Footnotes: ^{1} The Greens results are compared to The Greens–Green List totals in the 1989 election.; ^{2} Coalition for a New Socialist Party results are compared to Alliance for the Republic totals in the 1989 election.

=== Balearics ===
← Summary of the 6 June 1993 Congress of Deputies election results in the Balearics →
| Parties and alliances | Popular vote | | | Seats | |
| Parties and alliances | Votes | % | ±pp | Total | +/− |
|---|---|---|---|---|---|
| People's Party (PP) | 191,461 | 46.41 | +5.75 | 4 | +1 |
| Spanish Socialist Workers' Party (PSOE) | 140,145 | 33.97 | −0.51 | 3 | ±0 |
| United Left of the Islands (IU) | 24,574 | 5.96 | +0.87 | 0 | ±0 |
| Nationalists of the Balearic Islands (PSM–ENE) | 20,118 | 4.88 | +2.56 | 0 | ±0 |
| Majorcan, Menorcan and Pityusic Union (UMMP) | 10,053 | 2.44 | New | 0 | ±0 |
| The Greens of the Balearic Islands (EVIB)^{1} | 8,971 | 2.17 | −0.37 | 0 | ±0 |
| Democratic and Social Centre (CDS) | 7,648 | 1.85 | −7.34 | 0 | ±0 |
| Republican Left of Catalonia (ERC) | 2,848 | 0.69 | New | 0 | ±0 |
| Ruiz-Mateos Group–European Democratic Alliance (ARM–ADE) | 1,268 | 0.31 | −2.22 | 0 | ±0 |
| Natural Law Party (PLN) | 550 | 0.13 | New | 0 | ±0 |
| Spanish Balearic Alternative (ABE) | 416 | 0.10 | New | 0 | ±0 |
| Revolutionary Workers' Party (POR) | 369 | 0.09 | −0.04 | 0 | ±0 |
| Coalition for a New Socialist Party (CNPS)^{2} | 357 | 0.09 | ±0.00 | 0 | ±0 |
| Radical Balearic Party (PRB) | 282 | 0.07 | −0.05 | 0 | ±0 |
| Communist Unification of Spain (UCE) | 0 | 0.00 | New | 0 | ±0 |
| Blank ballots | 3,485 | 0.84 | −0.02 | | |
| Total | 412,545 | | | 7 | +1 |
| Valid votes | 412,545 | 99.44 | +0.61 | | |
| Invalid votes | 2,316 | 0.56 | −0.61 | | |
| Votes cast / turnout | 414,861 | 72.56 | +9.02 | | |
| Abstentions | 156,851 | 27.44 | −9.02 | | |
| Registered voters | 571,712 | | | | |
Sources
Footnotes: ^{1} The Greens of the Balearic Islands results are compared to The Greens–Green List totals in the 1989 election.; ^{2} Coalition for a New Socialist Party results are compared to Alliance for the Republic totals in the 1989 election.

=== Basque Country ===
← Summary of the 6 June 1993 Congress of Deputies election results in the Basque Country →
| Parties and alliances | Popular vote | | | Seats | |
| Parties and alliances | Votes | % | ±pp | Total | +/− |
|---|---|---|---|---|---|
| Socialist Party of the Basque Country–Basque Country Left (PSE–EE (PSOE))^{1} | 293,442 | 24.52 | −5.38 | 7 | −1 |
| Basque Nationalist Party (EAJ/PNV) | 287,908 | 24.05 | +1.27 | 5 | ±0 |
| People's Party (PP) | 175,758 | 14.68 | +5.31 | 4 | +2 |
| Popular Unity (HB) | 174,655 | 14.59 | −2.27 | 2 | −2 |
| Basque Solidarity–Basque Left (EA–EuE) | 117,856 | 9.85 | −1.32 | 1 | −1 |
| United Left (IU/EB) | 75,572 | 6.31 | +3.30 | 0 | ±0 |
| Alavese Unity (UA) | 16,623 | 1.39 | New | 0 | ±0 |
| The Greens (Berdeak/LV)^{2} | 12,247 | 1.02 | +0.94 | 0 | ±0 |
| Democratic and Social Centre (CDS) | 9,147 | 0.76 | −2.70 | 0 | ±0 |
| The Ecologists (LE) | 6,138 | 0.51 | −0.38 | 0 | ±0 |
| Workers' Socialist Party (PST) | 3,053 | 0.26 | −0.05 | 0 | ±0 |
| Ruiz-Mateos Group–European Democratic Alliance (ARM–ADE) | 2,530 | 0.21 | −0.49 | 0 | ±0 |
| Natural Law Party (PLN) | 901 | 0.08 | New | 0 | ±0 |
| Revolutionary Workers' Party (POR) | 732 | 0.06 | −0.02 | 0 | ±0 |
| Coalition for a New Socialist Party (CNPS)^{3} | 501 | 0.04 | −0.02 | 0 | ±0 |
| Referendum Tolerant Independent Political Party (PITRCG) | 408 | 0.03 | New | 0 | ±0 |
| Humanist Party (PH) | 353 | 0.03 | −0.05 | 0 | ±0 |
| Communist Unification of Spain (UCE) | 0 | 0.00 | New | 0 | ±0 |
| Blank ballots | 19,058 | 1.59 | +0.92 | | |
| Total | 1,196,882 | | | 19 | −2 |
| Valid votes | 1,196,882 | 99.23 | +0.06 | | |
| Invalid votes | 9,247 | 0.77 | −0.06 | | |
| Votes cast / turnout | 1,206,129 | 69.73 | +2.83 | | |
| Abstentions | 523,655 | 30.27 | −2.83 | | |
| Registered voters | 1,729,784 | | | | |
Sources
Footnotes: ^{1} Socialist Party of the Basque Country–Basque Country Left results are compared to the combined totals of Socialist Party of the Basque Country and Basque Country Left in the 1989 election.; ^{2} The Greens results are compared to Ecologist Party of the Basque Country–Green List totals in the 1989 election.; ^{3} Coalition for a New Socialist Party results are compared to Alliance for the Republic totals in the 1989 election.

=== Canary Islands ===
← Summary of the 6 June 1993 Congress of Deputies election results in the Canary Islands →
| Parties and alliances | Popular vote | | | Seats | |
| Parties and alliances | Votes | % | ±pp | Total | +/− |
|---|---|---|---|---|---|
| People's Party (PP) | 274,666 | 33.93 | +14.54 | 5 | +2 |
| Spanish Socialist Workers' Party (PSOE) | 241,648 | 29.85 | −6.25 | 5 | −2 |
| Canarian Coalition (CC)^{1} | 207,077 | 25.58 | +12.71 | 4 | +3 |
| Canarian United Left (IUC) | 40,314 | 4.98 | −2.98 | 0 | ±0 |
| Party of Gran Canaria (PGC) | 15,246 | 1.88 | New | 0 | ±0 |
| Democratic and Social Centre (CDS) | 9,910 | 1.22 | −16.36 | 0 | −3 |
| The Ecologists (LE) | 4,261 | 0.53 | −0.17 | 0 | ±0 |
| The Greens (Verdes)^{2} | 2,452 | 0.30 | −0.62 | 0 | ±0 |
| Workers' Socialist Party (PST) | 2,132 | 0.26 | −0.26 | 0 | ±0 |
| Tenerife Assembly (ATF) | 1,159 | 0.14 | New | 0 | ±0 |
| Ruiz-Mateos Group–European Democratic Alliance (ARM–ADE) | 1,082 | 0.13 | −1.38 | 0 | ±0 |
| Insular Group of Gran Canaria (AIGRANC) | 1,009 | 0.12 | New | 0 | ±0 |
| Communist Party of the Canarian People (PCPC) | 884 | 0.11 | −0.22 | 0 | ±0 |
| Coalition for a New Socialist Party (CNPS) | 780 | 0.10 | New | 0 | ±0 |
| Humanist Party (PH) | 567 | 0.07 | −0.07 | 0 | ±0 |
| Natural Law Party (PLN) | 563 | 0.07 | New | 0 | ±0 |
| Party of The People (LG) | 385 | 0.05 | New | 0 | ±0 |
| Tagoror Party (Tagoror) | 278 | 0.03 | −0.04 | 0 | ±0 |
| Coalition for Free Canaries (CCL) | 0 | 0.00 | New | 0 | ±0 |
| Blank ballots | 5,105 | 0.63 | +0.13 | | |
| Total | 809,518 | | | 14 | ±0 |
| Valid votes | 809,518 | 99.25 | +0.17 | | |
| Invalid votes | 6,129 | 0.75 | −0.17 | | |
| Votes cast / turnout | 815,647 | 68.92 | +6.77 | | |
| Abstentions | 367,853 | 31.08 | −6.77 | | |
| Registered voters | 1,183,500 | | | | |
Sources
Footnotes: ^{1} Canarian Coalition results are compared to Canarian Independent Groups totals in the 1989 election.; ^{2} The Greens results are compared to The Greens–Green List totals in the 1989 election.

=== Cantabria ===
← Summary of the 6 June 1993 Congress of Deputies election results in Cantabria →
| Parties and alliances | Popular vote | | | Seats | |
| Parties and alliances | Votes | % | ±pp | Total | +/− |
|---|---|---|---|---|---|
| Spanish Socialist Workers' Party (PSOE) | 122,418 | 37.17 | −2.90 | 3 | ±0 |
| People's Party (PP) | 121,967 | 37.03 | −1.38 | 2 | ±0 |
| Union for the Progress of Cantabria (UPCA) | 27,005 | 8.20 | New | 0 | ±0 |
| United Left (IU) | 24,453 | 7.42 | +1.02 | 0 | ±0 |
| Regionalist Party of Cantabria (PRC) | 18,608 | 5.65 | New | 0 | ±0 |
| Democratic and Social Centre (CDS) | 5,081 | 1.54 | −8.19 | 0 | ±0 |
| The Greens (LV) | 1,777 | 0.54 | −0.08 | 0 | ±0 |
| The Ecologists (LE) | 855 | 0.26 | −0.57 | 0 | ±0 |
| Workers' Socialist Party (PST) | 729 | 0.22 | −0.36 | 0 | ±0 |
| Ruiz-Mateos Group–European Democratic Alliance (ARM–ADE) | 557 | 0.17 | −0.57 | 0 | ±0 |
| Communist Party of the Peoples of Spain (PCPE) | 537 | 0.16 | −0.22 | 0 | ±0 |
| Nationalist Party of Cantabria (PNC) | 383 | 0.00 | New | 0 | ±0 |
| Humanist Party (PH) | 239 | 0.07 | −0.05 | 0 | ±0 |
| Natural Law Party (PLN) | 184 | 0.06 | New | 0 | ±0 |
| Spanish Democratic Republican Action (ARDE) | 152 | 0.05 | New | 0 | ±0 |
| Coalition for a New Socialist Party (CNPS)^{1} | 147 | 0.04 | −0.05 | 0 | ±0 |
| Communist Unification of Spain (UCE) | 0 | 0.00 | New | 0 | ±0 |
| Blank ballots | 4,252 | 1.29 | +0.36 | | |
| Total | 329,344 | | | 5 | ±0 |
| Valid votes | 329,344 | 99.19 | +0.27 | | |
| Invalid votes | 2,675 | 0.81 | −0.27 | | |
| Votes cast / turnout | 332,019 | 78.98 | +4.70 | | |
| Abstentions | 88,357 | 21.02 | −4.70 | | |
| Registered voters | 420,376 | | | | |
Sources
Footnotes: ^{1} Coalition for a New Socialist Party results are compared to Alliance for the Republic totals in the 1989 election.

=== Castile and León ===
← Summary of the 6 June 1993 Congress of Deputies election results in Castile and León →
| Parties and alliances | Popular vote | | | Seats | |
| Parties and alliances | Votes | % | ±pp | Total | +/− |
|---|---|---|---|---|---|
| People's Party (PP) | 771,705 | 47.37 | +7.12 | 20 | +2 |
| Spanish Socialist Workers' Party (PSOE) | 597,961 | 36.71 | +1.16 | 13 | −1 |
| United Left of Castile and León (IU) | 125,417 | 7.70 | +1.05 | 0 | ±0 |
| Democratic and Social Centre (CDS) | 67,517 | 4.14 | −8.61 | 0 | −1 |
| Leonese People's Union (UPL) | 12,246 | 0.75 | New | 0 | ±0 |
| The Greens (Verdes)^{1} | 11,570 | 0.71 | +0.13 | 0 | ±0 |
| The Ecologists (LE) | 4,955 | 0.30 | −0.53 | 0 | ±0 |
| Ruiz-Mateos Group–European Democratic Alliance (ARM–ADE) | 3,936 | 0.24 | −0.41 | 0 | ±0 |
| Commoners' Land–Castilian Nationalist Party (TC–PNC) | 2,876 | 0.18 | New | 0 | ±0 |
| Regionalist Unity of Castile and León (URCL) | 2,715 | 0.17 | New | 0 | ±0 |
| Party of El Bierzo (PB) | 1,882 | 0.12 | New | 0 | ±0 |
| People's Palentine Group (APP) | 1,410 | 0.09 | New | 0 | ±0 |
| Regionalist Party of the Leonese Country (PREPAL) | 1,193 | 0.07 | −0.13 | 0 | ±0 |
| Spanish Phalanx of the CNSO (FE–JONS) | 1,142 | 0.07 | −0.08 | 0 | ±0 |
| Castilianist Union (UC) | 825 | 0.05 | New | 0 | ±0 |
| Natural Law Party (PLN) | 802 | 0.05 | New | 0 | ±0 |
| Humanist Party (PH) | 699 | 0.04 | −0.08 | 0 | ±0 |
| Coalition for a New Socialist Party (CNPS)^{2} | 613 | 0.04 | −0.05 | 0 | ±0 |
| Gray Panthers of Spain (ACI) | 161 | 0.01 | New | 0 | ±0 |
| Communist Party of the Peoples of Spain (PCPE) | 147 | 0.01 | −0.17 | 0 | ±0 |
| Social Democratic Spanish Christian Monarchy (MCES) | 107 | 0.01 | New | 0 | ±0 |
| Progressive Sorian Union (US) | 98 | 0.01 | New | 0 | ±0 |
| Nationalist Party of Castile and León (PANCAL) | 70 | 0.00 | −0.08 | 0 | ±0 |
| Communist Unification of Spain (UCE) | 0 | 0.00 | New | 0 | ±0 |
| Blank ballots | 19,001 | 1.17 | +0.17 | | |
| Total | 1,629,048 | | | 33 | ±0 |
| Valid votes | 1,629,048 | 99.25 | +0.35 | | |
| Invalid votes | 12,335 | 0.75 | −0.35 | | |
| Votes cast / turnout | 1,641,383 | 78.27 | +4.92 | | |
| Abstentions | 455,722 | 21.73 | −4.92 | | |
| Registered voters | 2,097,105 | | | | |
Sources
Footnotes: ^{1} The Greens results are compared to The Greens–Green List totals in the 1989 election.; ^{2} Coalition for a New Socialist Party results are compared to Alliance for the Republic totals in the 1989 election.

=== Castilla–La Mancha ===
← Summary of the 6 June 1993 Congress of Deputies election results in Castilla–La Mancha →
| Parties and alliances | Popular vote | | | Seats | |
| Parties and alliances | Votes | % | ±pp | Total | +/− |
|---|---|---|---|---|---|
| Spanish Socialist Workers' Party (PSOE) | 487,810 | 45.30 | −2.66 | 10 | −2 |
| People's Party (PP) | 463,295 | 43.03 | +9.27 | 10 | +2 |
| United Left (IU) | 81,888 | 7.61 | +0.65 | 0 | ±0 |
| Democratic and Social Centre (CDS) | 21,868 | 2.03 | −5.70 | 0 | ±0 |
| The Greens (Verdes)^{1} | 5,573 | 0.52 | +0.04 | 0 | ±0 |
| The Ecologists (LE) | 2,786 | 0.26 | −0.23 | 0 | ±0 |
| Ruiz-Mateos Group–European Democratic Alliance (ARM–ADE) | 2,230 | 0.21 | −0.49 | 0 | ±0 |
| Commoners' Land–Castilian Nationalist Party (TC–PNC) | 966 | 0.09 | New | 0 | ±0 |
| Natural Law Party (PLN) | 539 | 0.05 | New | 0 | ±0 |
| Humanist Party (PH) | 431 | 0.04 | −0.03 | 0 | ±0 |
| Coalition for a New Socialist Party (CNPS)^{1} | 416 | 0.04 | −0.02 | 0 | ±0 |
| Regionalist Party of Guadalajara (PRGU) | 267 | 0.02 | −0.02 | 0 | ±0 |
| Social Democratic Spanish Christian Monarchy (MCES) | 137 | 0.01 | New | 0 | ±0 |
| Castilianist Union (UC) | 124 | 0.01 | New | 0 | ±0 |
| Spanish Phalanx of the CNSO (FE–JONS) | 75 | 0.01 | −0.09 | 0 | ±0 |
| Communist Unification of Spain (UCE) | 0 | 0.00 | New | 0 | ±0 |
| Blank ballots | 8,339 | 0.77 | +0.14 | | |
| Total | 1,076,744 | | | 20 | ±0 |
| Valid votes | 1,076,744 | 99.38 | +0.22 | | |
| Invalid votes | 6,765 | 0.62 | −0.22 | | |
| Votes cast / turnout | 1,083,509 | 82.13 | +5.69 | | |
| Abstentions | 235,743 | 17.87 | −5.69 | | |
| Registered voters | 1,319,252 | | | | |
Sources
Footnotes: ^{1} The Greens results are compared to The Greens–Green List totals in the 1989 election.; ^{2} Coalition for a New Socialist Party results are compared to Alliance for the Republic totals in the 1989 election.

=== Catalonia ===
← Summary of the 6 June 1993 Congress of Deputies election results in Catalonia →
| Parties and alliances | Popular vote | | | Seats | |
| Parties and alliances | Votes | % | ±pp | Total | +/− |
|---|---|---|---|---|---|
| Socialists' Party of Catalonia (PSC–PSOE) | 1,277,838 | 34.87 | −0.72 | 18 | −2 |
| Convergence and Union (CiU) | 1,165,783 | 31.82 | −0.86 | 17 | −1 |
| People's Party (PP) | 624,493 | 17.04 | +6.40 | 8 | +4 |
| Initiative for Catalonia (IC) | 273,444 | 7.46 | +0.13 | 3 | ±0 |
| Republican Left of Catalonia (ERC) | 186,784 | 5.10 | +2.42 | 1 | +1 |
| The Greens–Ecologist Confederation of Catalonia (EV–CEC)^{1} | 36,683 | 1.00 | −0.44 | 0 | ±0 |
| Democratic and Social Centre (CDS) | 27,576 | 0.75 | −3.57 | 0 | −1 |
| The Ecologists (LE) | 11,846 | 0.32 | −0.45 | 0 | ±0 |
| Workers' Socialist Party (PST) | 9,356 | 0.26 | −0.13 | 0 | ±0 |
| Ecologist Party of Catalonia–VERDE (PEC–VERDE) | 9,249 | 0.25 | −0.07 | 0 | ±0 |
| Ruiz-Mateos Group–European Democratic Alliance (ARM–ADE) | 6,961 | 0.19 | −1.01 | 0 | ±0 |
| Revolutionary Workers' Party (POR) | 3,246 | 0.09 | −0.01 | 0 | ±0 |
| Natural Law Party (PLN) | 1,592 | 0.04 | New | 0 | ±0 |
| Humanist Party (PH) | 1,513 | 0.04 | −0.04 | 0 | ±0 |
| Spanish Phalanx of the CNSO (FE–JONS) | 1,266 | 0.03 | −0.05 | 0 | ±0 |
| Coalition for a New Socialist Party (CNPS)^{2} | 1,106 | 0.03 | −0.02 | 0 | ±0 |
| Authentic Spanish Phalanx (FEA) | 747 | 0.02 | New | 0 | ±0 |
| Union of Autonomies (UDLA) | 594 | 0.02 | New | 0 | ±0 |
| Communist Unification of Spain (UCE) | 0 | 0.00 | New | 0 | ±0 |
| Freixes Independent Group (Freixes) | 0 | 0.00 | New | 0 | ±0 |
| Blank ballots | 24,156 | 0.66 | +0.05 | | |
| Total | 3,664,233 | | | 47 | +1 |
| Valid votes | 3,664,233 | 99.59 | +0.15 | | |
| Invalid votes | 15,047 | 0.41 | −0.15 | | |
| Votes cast / turnout | 3,679,280 | 75.37 | +7.75 | | |
| Abstentions | 1,202,375 | 24.63 | −7.75 | | |
| Registered voters | 4,881,655 | | | | |
Sources
Footnotes: ^{1} The Greens–Ecologist Confederation of Catalonia results are compared to the combined totals of Green Alternative–Ecologist Movement of Catalonia and The Greens–Green List in the 1989 election.; ^{2} Coalition for a New Socialist Party results are compared to Alliance for the Republic totals in the 1989 election.

=== Extremadura ===
← Summary of the 6 June 1993 Congress of Deputies election results in Extremadura →
| Parties and alliances | Popular vote | | | Seats | |
| Parties and alliances | Votes | % | ±pp | Total | +/− |
|---|---|---|---|---|---|
| Spanish Socialist Workers' Party (PSOE) | 342,977 | 51.50 | −2.40 | 7 | ±0 |
| People's Party (PP) | 238,191 | 35.77 | +10.80 | 4 | ±0 |
| United Left of Extremadura (IU) | 52,214 | 7.84 | +0.97 | 0 | ±0 |
| Democratic and Social Centre (CDS) | 13,598 | 2.04 | −7.48 | 0 | ±0 |
| United Extremadura (EU) | 6,908 | 1.04 | −0.75 | 0 | ±0 |
| The Greens (LV)^{1} | 3,388 | 0.51 | +0.24 | 0 | ±0 |
| Extremaduran Regionalist Party (PREx) | 2,086 | 0.31 | New | 0 | ±0 |
| The Ecologists (LE) | 1,560 | 0.23 | −0.13 | 0 | ±0 |
| Ruiz-Mateos Group–European Democratic Alliance (ARM–ADE) | 699 | 0.10 | −0.49 | 0 | ±0 |
| Natural Law Party (PLN) | 300 | 0.05 | New | 0 | ±0 |
| Coalition for a New Socialist Party (CNPS)^{2} | 264 | 0.04 | ±0.00 | 0 | ±0 |
| Humanist Party (PH) | 119 | 0.02 | −0.03 | 0 | ±0 |
| Communist Unification of Spain (UCE) | 0 | 0.00 | New | 0 | ±0 |
| Blank ballots | 3,609 | 0.54 | +0.07 | | |
| Total | 665,913 | | | 11 | ±0 |
| Valid votes | 665,913 | 99.52 | +0.24 | | |
| Invalid votes | 3,194 | 0.48 | −0.24 | | |
| Votes cast / turnout | 669,107 | 80.46 | +4.89 | | |
| Abstentions | 162,457 | 19.56 | −4.89 | | |
| Registered voters | 831,564 | | | | |
Sources
Footnotes: ^{1} The Greens results are compared to The Greens–Green List totals in the 1989 election.; ^{2} Coalition for a New Socialist Party results are compared to Alliance for the Republic totals in the 1989 election.

=== Galicia ===
← Summary of the 6 June 1993 Congress of Deputies election results in Galicia →
| Parties and alliances | Popular vote | | | Seats | |
| Parties and alliances | Votes | % | ±pp | Total | +/− |
|---|---|---|---|---|---|
| People's Party (PP) | 746,964 | 47.12 | +8.10 | 15 | +1 |
| Socialists' Party of Galicia (PSdeG–PSOE) | 569,899 | 35.95 | +1.39 | 11 | −1 |
| Galician Nationalist Bloc (BNG) | 126,965 | 8.01 | +4.42 | 0 | ±0 |
| United Left–Galician Unity (EU–UG) | 74,605 | 4.71 | +1.43 | 0 | ±0 |
| Democratic and Social Centre (CDS) | 24,279 | 1.53 | −6.27 | 0 | −1 |
| The Greens (Os Verdes)^{1} | 5,466 | 0.34 | −0.10 | 0 | ±0 |
| Galician Nationalist Convergence (CNG) | 4,663 | 0.29 | New | 0 | ±0 |
| The Ecologists (LE) | 4,539 | 0.29 | −0.20 | 0 | ±0 |
| Ruiz-Mateos Group–European Democratic Alliance (ARM–ADE) | 3,913 | 0.25 | −0.73 | 0 | ±0 |
| Galician Alternative (AG) | 3,286 | 0.21 | New | 0 | ±0 |
| Communist Party of the Galician People (PCPG) | 2,217 | 0.14 | ±0.00 | 0 | ±0 |
| Workers' Socialist Party (PST) | 1,355 | 0.09 | −0.43 | 0 | ±0 |
| Coalition for a New Socialist Party (CNPS)^{2} | 930 | 0.06 | +0.02 | 0 | ±0 |
| Humanist Party (PH) | 861 | 0.05 | −0.06 | 0 | ±0 |
| Party of El Bierzo (PB) | 799 | 0.05 | New | 0 | ±0 |
| Natural Law Party (PLN) | 727 | 0.05 | New | 0 | ±0 |
| Communist Unification of Spain (UCE) | 0 | 0.00 | New | 0 | ±0 |
| Blank ballots | 13,762 | 0.87 | +0.02 | | |
| Total | 1,585,230 | | | 26 | −1 |
| Valid votes | 1,585,230 | 99.27 | +0.40 | | |
| Invalid votes | 11,626 | 0.73 | −0.40 | | |
| Votes cast / turnout | 1,596,856 | 69.64 | +9.51 | | |
| Abstentions | 696,141 | 30.36 | −9.51 | | |
| Registered voters | 2,292,997 | | | | |
Sources
Footnotes: ^{1} The Greens results are compared to The Greens–Green List totals in the 1989 election.; ^{2} Coalition for a New Socialist Party results are compared to Alliance for the Republic totals in the 1989 election.

=== La Rioja ===
← Summary of the 6 June 1993 Congress of Deputies election results in La Rioja →
| Parties and alliances | Popular vote | | | Seats | |
| Parties and alliances | Votes | % | ±pp | Total | +/− |
|---|---|---|---|---|---|
| People's Party (PP) | 78,792 | 46.26 | +5.17 | 2 | ±0 |
| Spanish Socialist Workers' Party (PSOE) | 64,037 | 37.60 | −2.10 | 2 | ±0 |
| United Left–La Rioja (IU) | 11,850 | 6.96 | +0.54 | 0 | ±0 |
| Riojan Party (PR) | 7,532 | 4.42 | New | 0 | ±0 |
| Democratic and Social Centre (CDS) | 3,609 | 2.12 | −5.06 | 0 | ±0 |
| The Greens (Verdes) | 996 | 0.58 | New | 0 | ±0 |
| The Ecologists (LE) | 493 | 0.29 | −0.99 | 0 | ±0 |
| Ruiz-Mateos Group–European Democratic Alliance (ARM–ADE) | 432 | 0.25 | −0.98 | 0 | ±0 |
| Health and Ecology in Solidarity (SEES) | 142 | 0.08 | New | 0 | ±0 |
| Natural Law Party (PLN) | 82 | 0.05 | New | 0 | ±0 |
| Coalition for a New Socialist Party (CNPS) | 76 | 0.04 | New | 0 | ±0 |
| Spanish Democratic Republican Action (ARDE) | 73 | 0.04 | New | 0 | ±0 |
| Humanist Party (PH) | 71 | 0.04 | New | 0 | ±0 |
| Communist Unification of Spain (UCE) | 0 | 0.00 | New | 0 | ±0 |
| Blank ballots | 2,125 | 1.25 | +0.05 | | |
| Total | 170,310 | | | 4 | ±0 |
| Valid votes | 170,310 | 99.44 | +0.33 | | |
| Invalid votes | 967 | 0.56 | −0.33 | | |
| Votes cast / turnout | 171,277 | 80.00 | +7.96 | | |
| Abstentions | 42,807 | 20.00 | −7.96 | | |
| Registered voters | 214,084 | | | | |

=== Madrid ===
← Summary of the 6 June 1993 Congress of Deputies election results in Madrid →
| Parties and alliances | Popular vote | | | Seats | |
| Parties and alliances | Votes | % | ±pp | Total | +/− |
|---|---|---|---|---|---|
| People's Party (PP) | 1,373,042 | 43.92 | +9.70 | 16 | +4 |
| Spanish Socialist Workers' Party (PSOE) | 1,093,015 | 34.96 | +1.47 | 13 | +1 |
| United Left (IU) | 455,685 | 14.58 | −0.84 | 5 | ±0 |
| Democratic and Social Centre (CDS) | 93,347 | 2.99 | −8.00 | 0 | −4 |
| The Greens (Verdes)^{1} | 33,295 | 1.07 | −0.07 | 0 | ±0 |
| Ruiz-Mateos Group–European Democratic Alliance (ARM–ADE) | 13,782 | 0.44 | −0.51 | 0 | ±0 |
| The Ecologists (LE) | 10,429 | 0.33 | −0.56 | 0 | ±0 |
| Workers' Socialist Party (PST) | 4,808 | 0.15 | −0.16 | 0 | ±0 |
| United Extremadura (EU) | 3,745 | 0.12 | New | 0 | ±0 |
| Madrilenian Independent Regional Party (PRIM)^{2} | 1,917 | 0.06 | −0.07 | 0 | ±0 |
| Spanish Phalanx of the CNSO (FE–JONS) | 1,488 | 0.05 | −0.09 | 0 | ±0 |
| Revolutionary Workers' Party (POR) | 1,391 | 0.04 | −0.03 | 0 | ±0 |
| Independent Spanish Phalanx (FEI) | 1,212 | 0.04 | +0.01 | 0 | ±0 |
| Natural Law Party (PLN) | 1,209 | 0.04 | New | 0 | ±0 |
| Spanish Democratic Republican Action (ARDE) | 1,202 | 0.04 | ±0.00 | 0 | ±0 |
| Gray Panthers of Spain (ACI) | 1,189 | 0.04 | New | 0 | ±0 |
| Spanish Catholic Movement (MCE) | 1,178 | 0.04 | New | 0 | ±0 |
| Humanist Party (PH) | 1,079 | 0.03 | −0.04 | 0 | ±0 |
| Commoners' Land–Castilian Nationalist Party (TC–PNC) | 805 | 0.03 | New | 0 | ±0 |
| Progressive Front of Spain (FPE) | 641 | 0.02 | New | 0 | ±0 |
| Leonese People's Union (UPL) | 608 | 0.02 | New | 0 | ±0 |
| Coalition for a New Socialist Party (CNPS)^{3} | 529 | 0.02 | −0.04 | 0 | ±0 |
| Communist Unification of Spain (UCE) | 0 | 0.00 | New | 0 | ±0 |
| Centrist Unity–Democratic Spanish Party (PED) | 0 | 0.00 | −0.04 | 0 | ±0 |
| Blank ballots | 30,554 | 0.98 | −0.04 | | |
| Total | 3,126,150 | | | 34 | +1 |
| Valid votes | 3,126,150 | 99.61 | +0.14 | | |
| Invalid votes | 12,361 | 0.39 | −0.14 | | |
| Votes cast / turnout | 3,138,511 | 78.92 | +6.20 | | |
| Abstentions | 838,551 | 21.08 | −6.20 | | |
| Registered voters | 3,977,062 | | | | |
Sources
Footnotes: ^{1} The Greens results are compared to The Greens–Green List totals in the 1989 election.; ^{2} Madrilenian Independent Regional Party results are compared to Regional Party of Madrid totals in the 1989 election.; ^{3} Coalition for a New Socialist Party results are compared to Alliance for the Republic totals in the 1989 election.

=== Murcia ===
← Summary of the 6 June 1993 Congress of Deputies election results in Murcia →
| Parties and alliances | Popular vote | | | Seats | |
| Parties and alliances | Votes | % | ±pp | Total | +/− |
|---|---|---|---|---|---|
| People's Party (PP) | 310,507 | 47.29 | +17.31 | 4 | +1 |
| Spanish Socialist Workers' Party (PSOE) | 253,324 | 38.59 | −7.47 | 4 | −1 |
| United Left (IU) | 63,717 | 9.71 | +0.52 | 1 | +1 |
| Democratic and Social Centre (CDS) | 14,442 | 2.20 | −8.16 | 0 | −1 |
| The Greens (LV)^{1} | 5,085 | 0.77 | +0.12 | 0 | ±0 |
| The Ecologists (LE) | 1,685 | 0.26 | −0.44 | 0 | ±0 |
| Rainbow (Arcoiris) | 1,407 | 0.21 | New | 0 | ±0 |
| Ruiz-Mateos Group (ARM) | 1,399 | 0.21 | −0.91 | 0 | ±0 |
| Revolutionary Workers' Party (POR) | 686 | 0.10 | New | 0 | ±0 |
| Humanist Party (PH) | 487 | 0.07 | −0.04 | 0 | ±0 |
| Natural Law Party (PLN) | 362 | 0.06 | New | 0 | ±0 |
| Communist Unification of Spain (UCE) | 0 | 0.00 | New | 0 | ±0 |
| Blank ballots | 3,433 | 0.52 | +0.05 | | |
| Total | 656,534 | | | 9 | ±0 |
| Valid votes | 656,534 | 99.48 | +0.15 | | |
| Invalid votes | 3,418 | 0.52 | −0.15 | | |
| Votes cast / turnout | 659,952 | 81.56 | +7.31 | | |
| Abstentions | 149,234 | 18.44 | −7.31 | | |
| Registered voters | 809,186 | | | | |
Sources
Footnotes: ^{1} The Greens results are compared to The Greens–Green List totals in the 1989 election.

=== Navarre ===
← Summary of the 6 June 1993 Congress of Deputies election results in Navarre →
| Parties and alliances | Popular vote | | | Seats | |
| Parties and alliances | Votes | % | ±pp | Total | +/− |
|---|---|---|---|---|---|
| Navarrese People's Union–People's Party (UPN–PP) | 112,228 | 36.13 | +2.95 | 3 | ±0 |
| Spanish Socialist Workers' Party (PSOE)^{1} | 108,305 | 34.87 | +0.82 | 2 | ±0 |
| Popular Unity (HB) | 32,221 | 10.37 | −0.65 | 0 | ±0 |
| United Left (IU/EB) | 27,043 | 8.71 | +2.96 | 0 | ±0 |
| Basque Solidarity–Basque Left (EA–EuE) | 11,437 | 3.68 | −1.12 | 0 | ±0 |
| Democratic and Social Centre (CDS) | 5,241 | 1.69 | −5.34 | 0 | ±0 |
| The Greens (LV) | 4,263 | 1.37 | New | 0 | ±0 |
| Basque Nationalist Party (EAJ/PNV) | 3,540 | 1.14 | +0.22 | 0 | ±0 |
| Ruiz-Mateos Group–European Democratic Alliance (ARM–ADE) | 903 | 0.29 | −0.38 | 0 | ±0 |
| Natural Law Party (PLN) | 332 | 0.11 | New | 0 | ±0 |
| Humanist Party (PH) | 244 | 0.08 | New | 0 | ±0 |
| Revolutionary Workers' Party (POR) | 201 | 0.06 | −0.03 | 0 | ±0 |
| Coalition for a New Socialist Party (CNPS)^{2} | 172 | 0.06 | −0.04 | 0 | ±0 |
| Communist Unification of Spain (UCE) | 0 | 0.00 | New | 0 | ±0 |
| Blank ballots | 4,495 | 1.45 | +0.39 | | |
| Total | 310,625 | | | 5 | ±0 |
| Valid votes | 310,625 | 99.24 | +0.03 | | |
| Invalid votes | 2,374 | 0.76 | −0.03 | | |
| Votes cast / turnout | 312,999 | 73.58 | +5.04 | | |
| Abstentions | 112,388 | 26.42 | −5.04 | | |
| Registered voters | 425,387 | | | | |
Sources
Footnotes: ^{1} Spanish Socialist Workers' Party results are compared to the combined totals of Spanish Socialist Workers' Party and Basque Country Left in the 1989 election.; ^{2} Coalition for a New Socialist Party results are compared to Alliance for the Republic totals in the 1989 election.

=== Valencian Community ===
← Summary of the 6 June 1993 Congress of Deputies election results in the Valencian Community →
| Parties and alliances | Popular vote | | | Seats | |
| Parties and alliances | Votes | % | ±pp | Total | +/− |
|---|---|---|---|---|---|
| People's Party (PP) | 987,317 | 40.48 | +13.48 | 15 | +6 |
| Spanish Socialist Workers' Party (PSOE) | 935,325 | 38.35 | −3.11 | 12 | −4 |
| United Left of the Valencian Country (EU–PV) | 256,929 | 10.53 | +1.46 | 3 | +1 |
| Valencian Union (UV) | 112,341 | 4.61 | −2.23 | 1 | −1 |
| Valencian People's Union (UPV) | 41,052 | 1.68 | −0.24 | 0 | ±0 |
| Democratic and Social Centre (CDS) | 39,923 | 1.64 | −6.21 | 0 | −2 |
| The Greens (LV)^{1} | 22,971 | 0.94 | −0.75 | 0 | ±0 |
| The Ecologists (LE) | 7,167 | 0.29 | −0.44 | 0 | ±0 |
| Ruiz-Mateos Group–European Democratic Alliance (ARM–ADE) | 5,792 | 0.24 | −0.79 | 0 | ±0 |
| Spanish Democratic Republican Action (ARDE) | 1,636 | 0.07 | New | 0 | ±0 |
| Workers' Socialist Party (PST) | 1,631 | 0.07 | −0.25 | 0 | ±0 |
| Revolutionary Workers' Party (POR) | 1,604 | 0.07 | New | 0 | ±0 |
| Spanish Phalanx of the CNSO (FE–JONS) | 1,544 | 0.06 | −0.09 | 0 | ±0 |
| Valencian Nationalist Left (ENV) | 1,517 | 0.06 | −0.04 | 0 | ±0 |
| The Greens of the Alicantine Country (PVPA) | 1,375 | 0.06 | New | 0 | ±0 |
| Cantonal Party (PCAN) | 1,300 | 0.05 | New | 0 | ±0 |
| Communist Party of the Peoples of Spain (PCPE) | 1,148 | 0.05 | −0.14 | 0 | ±0 |
| Natural Law Party (PLN) | 873 | 0.04 | New | 0 | ±0 |
| Health and Ecology in Solidarity (Eco–Verde) | 821 | 0.03 | New | 0 | ±0 |
| Humanist Party (PH) | 764 | 0.03 | −0.03 | 0 | ±0 |
| Coalition for a New Socialist Party (CNPS)^{2} | 729 | 0.03 | −0.06 | 0 | ±0 |
| Alicantine Democratic Union (UniDA) | 715 | 0.03 | New | 0 | ±0 |
| Gray Panthers of Spain (ACI) | 294 | 0.01 | New | 0 | ±0 |
| Communist Unification of Spain (UCE) | 0 | 0.00 | New | 0 | ±0 |
| Blank ballots | 14,188 | 0.58 | +0.06 | | |
| Total | 2,438,956 | | | 31 | ±0 |
| Valid votes | 2,438,956 | 99.45 | +0.02 | | |
| Invalid votes | 13,465 | 0.55 | −0.02 | | |
| Votes cast / turnout | 2,452,421 | 81.71 | +6.91 | | |
| Abstentions | 548,978 | 18.29 | −6.91 | | |
| Registered voters | 3,001,399 | | | | |
Sources
Footnotes: ^{1} The Greens results are compared to The Greens–Green List totals in the 1989 election.; ^{2} Coalition for a New Socialist Party results are compared to Alliance for the Republic totals in the 1989 election.

== Autonomous cities ==
=== Ceuta ===
← Summary of the 6 June 1993 Congress of Deputies election results in Ceuta →
| Parties and alliances | Popular vote | | | Seats | |
| Parties and alliances | Votes | % | ±pp | Total | +/− |
|---|---|---|---|---|---|
| People's Party (PP) | 15,276 | 50.93 | +17.31 | 1 | +1 |
| Spanish Socialist Workers' Party (PSOE) | 12,170 | 40.58 | +2.87 | 0 | −1 |
| Socialist Party of the People of Ceuta (PSPC) | 1,155 | 3.85 | New | 0 | ±0 |
| The Greens (LV)^{1} | 491 | 1.64 | −1.66 | 0 | ±0 |
| Democratic and Social Centre (CDS) | 485 | 1.62 | −6.58 | 0 | ±0 |
| Workers' Socialist Party (PST) | 100 | 0.33 | −0.32 | 0 | ±0 |
| Natural Law Party (PLN) | 43 | 0.14 | New | 0 | ±0 |
| Initiative for Ceuta (INCE) | 42 | 0.14 | New | 0 | ±0 |
| Communist Unification of Spain (UCE) | 0 | 0.00 | New | 0 | ±0 |
| Blank ballots | 231 | 0.77 | −0.41 | | |
| Total | 29,993 | | | 1 | ±0 |
| Valid votes | 29,993 | 99.50 | +0.42 | | |
| Invalid votes | 152 | 0.50 | −0.42 | | |
| Votes cast / turnout | 30,145 | 62.13 | +6.19 | | |
| Abstentions | 18,372 | 37.87 | −6.19 | | |
| Registered voters | 48,517 | | | | |
Sources
Footnotes: ^{1} The Greens results are compared to The Greens–Green List totals in the 1989 election.

=== Melilla ===
← Summary of the 6 June 1993 Congress of Deputies election results in Melilla →
| Parties and alliances | Popular vote | | | Seats | |
| Parties and alliances | Votes | % | ±pp | Total | +/− |
|---|---|---|---|---|---|
| Spanish Socialist Workers' Party (PSOE) | 12,885 | 48.79 | +10.29 | 1 | +1 |
| People's Party (PP) | 11,865 | 44.92 | −10.76 | 0 | −1 |
| United Left (IU) | 687 | 2.60 | New | 0 | ±0 |
| Democratic and Social Centre (CDS) | 569 | 2.15 | +0.35 | 0 | ±0 |
| Natural Law Party (PLN) | 80 | 0.30 | New | 0 | ±0 |
| Blank ballots | 325 | 1.23 | +0.33 | | |
| Total | 26,411 | | | 1 | ±0 |
| Valid votes | 26,411 | 99.57 | +0.28 | | |
| Invalid votes | 115 | 0.43 | −0.28 | | |
| Votes cast / turnout | 26,526 | 66.14 | +14.25 | | |
| Abstentions | 13,579 | 33.86 | −14.25 | | |
| Registered voters | 40,105 | | | | |
