= 2011 Ceuta Assembly election =

Election in the Spanish autonomous city of Ceuta

- 22 May 2011

All 25 seats in the Assembly of Ceuta 13 seats needed for a majority
- Opinion polls
- Registered: 60,357 4.9%
- Turnout: 31,003 (51.4%); 8.9 pp
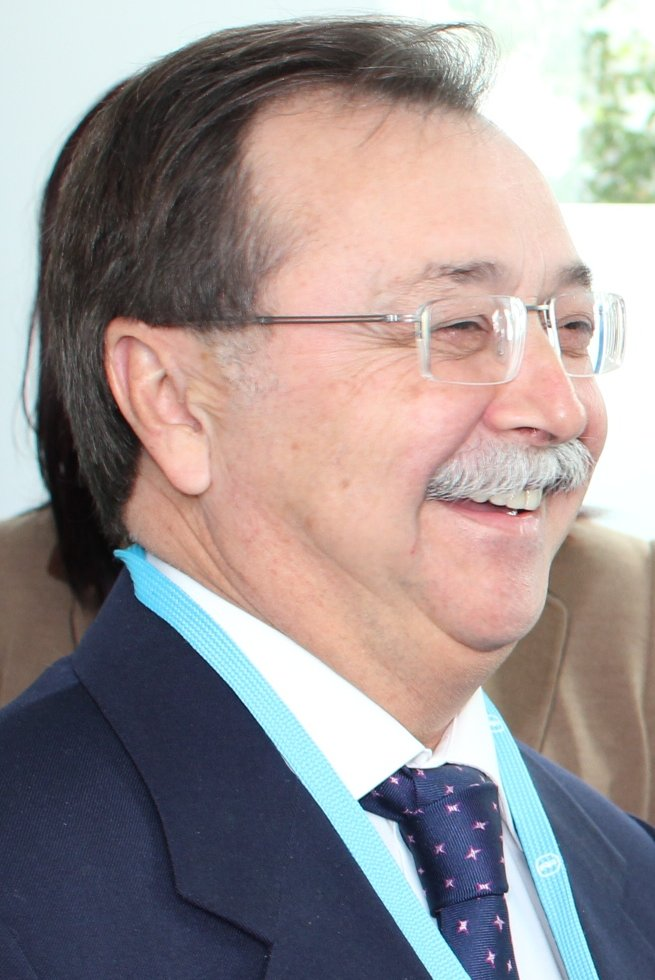

	First party	Second party	Third party
Leader	Juan Jesús Vivas	Mohamed Alí	José Antonio Carracao
Party	PP	Caballas	PSOE
Leader since	October 1999	14 March 2011	13 December 2008
Last election	19 seats, 65.2%	4 seats, 20.9% (Note: Aggregated data for UDCE–IU and PSPC in the 2007 election.)	2 seats, 6.7%
Seats won	18	4	3
Seat change	1	0	1
Popular vote	20,054	4,407	3,601
Percentage	65.2%	14.3%	11.7%
Swing	0.0 pp	6.6 pp	5.0 pp
Mayor-President before election
Juan Jesús Vivas
PP
Elected Mayor-President
Juan Jesús Vivas
PP

The 2011 Ceuta Assembly election was held on Sunday, 22 May 2011, to elect the 5th Assembly of the Autonomous City of Ceuta. All 25 seats in the Assembly were up for election. The election was held simultaneously with regional elections in thirteen autonomous communities and local elections all throughout Spain.

The People's Party (PP) has dominated recent elections to the Assembly, winning 19 of the seats in the 2003 and 2007 elections and polls suggested incorrectly that the PP was likely to increase its majority. The second largest party, the Ceutan Democratic Union (UCDE), formed an electoral alliance with the Socialist Party of the People of Ceuta (PSPC) under the name Caballas Coalition (Caballas). UCDE did not repeat its alliance with United Left of Ceuta (IU), that decided not to take part in the election. The third largest party, the Spanish Socialist Workers' Party (PSOE), was predicted incorrectly to overtake the Caballas Coalition, according to opinion polls.

Juan Jesús Vivas Lara (PP) retained the post of Mayor-President, held since 2001.

== Electoral system ==
The Assembly of Ceuta was the top-tier administrative and governing body of the autonomous city of Ceuta. Voting for the Assembly was on the basis of universal suffrage, which comprised all nationals over eighteen, registered and residing in the municipality of Ceuta and in full enjoyment of their political rights, as well as resident non-national European citizens and those whose country of origin allowed Spanish nationals to vote in their own elections by virtue of a treaty.

The 25 members of the Assembly of Ceuta were elected using the D'Hondt method and a closed list proportional representation, with a threshold of 5 percent of valid votes—which included blank ballots—being applied. Parties not reaching the threshold were not taken into consideration for seat distribution.

The Mayor-President was indirectly elected by the plenary assembly. A legal clause required that mayoral candidates earned the vote of an absolute majority of members, or else the candidate of the most-voted party in the assembly was to be automatically appointed to the post. In case of a tie, a toss-up would determine the appointee.

== Parties and candidates ==
The electoral law allowed for parties and federations registered in the interior ministry, coalitions and groupings of electors to present lists of candidates. Parties and federations intending to form a coalition ahead of an election were required to inform the relevant Electoral Commission within ten days of the election call, whereas groupings of electors needed to secure the signature of at least one percent of the electorate in the constituencies for which they sought election, disallowing electors from signing for more than one list of candidates.

Below is a list of the main parties and coalitions which contested the election:

Parties and coalitions	Ideology	Candidate
People's Party (PP)	Conservatism, Christian democracy	Juan Jesús Vivas
Caballas Coalition (Caballas)	Regionalism	Mohamed Alí
Spanish Socialist Workers' Party (PSOE)	Social democracy	José Antonio Carracao

== Opinion polls ==
The table below lists voting intention estimates in reverse chronological order, showing the most recent first and using the dates when the survey fieldwork was done, as opposed to the date of publication. Where the fieldwork dates are unknown, the date of publication is given instead. The highest percentage figure in each polling survey is displayed with its background shaded in the leading party's colour. If a tie ensues, this is applied to the figures with the highest percentages. The "Lead" column on the right shows the percentage-point difference between the parties with the highest percentages in a poll. When available, seat projections determined by the polling organisations are displayed below (or in place of) the percentages in a smaller font; 13 seats were required for an absolute majority in the Assembly of Ceuta.

Polling firm/Commissioner	Fieldwork date	Sample size	Turnout	PP	Caballas	PSOE	UPyD	Lead
2011 Assembly election	22 May 2011	—N/a	51.4	65.2; 18	14.3; 4	11.7; 3	2.7; 0	50.9
Sigma Dos/El Mundo	11–14 Apr 2011	300	?	70.1; 19/20	9.4; 2	13.6; 3/4	–	56.5
CIS	13 Apr 2011	300	?	68.9; 21	7.0; 2	9.4; 2	2.0; 0	59.5
Sigma Dos/PP	21 Jan 2011	1,000	?	73.0– 74.0; 20	? 2	? 3	–	?
Sigma Dos/El Mundo	28–29 Dec 2010	300	?	71.4; 19/20	9.6; 2	13.5; 3/4	–	57.9
Sigma Dos/El Mundo	26–27 May 2010	300	?	74.3; 21	9.6; 2	8.5; 2	–	64.7
Mercociudad/PP	6 May 2010	500	?	? 19	? 3/4	? 2/3	–	?
2009 EP election	7 Jun 2009	—N/a	31.6	59.5 (16)	–	32.7 (9)	3.6 (0)	26.8
2008 general election	9 Mar 2008	—N/a	63.3	55.1 (14)	–	40.5 (11)	1.3 (0)	14.6
2007 Assembly election	27 May 2007	—N/a	60.3	65.2; 19	16.4; 4	8.7; 2	–	48.8

== Results ==
← Summary of the 22 May 2011 Assembly of Ceuta election results →
Parties and alliances	Popular vote			Seats	
Parties and alliances	Votes	%	±pp	Total	+/−
People's Party (PP)	20,054	65.16	–0.02	18	–1
Caballas Coalition (Caballas)^{1}	4,407	14.32	–6.60	4	±0
Spanish Socialist Workers' Party (PSOE)	3,601	11.70	+3.05	3	+1
Union, Progress and Democracy (UPyD)	818	2.66	New	0	±0
Democratic and Social Party of Ceuta (PDSC)	720	2.34	–1.31	0	±0
The Greens–Green Group of Ceuta (LV–GV)	570	1.85	+0.90	0	±0
The Phalanx (FE)	138	0.45	New	0	±0
Blank ballots	468	1.52	+0.86		
Total	30,776			25	±0
Valid votes	30,776	99.27	–0.16		
Invalid votes	227	0.73	+0.16		
Votes cast / turnout	31,003	51.37	–8.92		
Abstentions	29,354	49.63	+8.92		
Registered voters	60,357				
Sources
Footnotes: ^{1} Caballas Coalition results are compared to the combined totals of Ceutan Democratic Union–United Left of Ceuta and Socialist Party of the People of Ceuta in the 2007 election.

Popular vote
PP	65.16%
Caballas	14.32%
PSOE	11.70%
UPyD	2.66%
PDSC	2.34%
LV–GV	1.85%
FE	0.45%
Blank ballots	1.52%

Seats
PP	72.00%
Caballas	16.00%
PSOE	12.00%
