= 1995 Ceuta Assembly election =

Election in the Spanish autonomous city of Ceuta

← 1991	28 May 1995	1999 →

All 25 seats in the Assembly of Ceuta 13 seats needed for a majority
- Opinion polls
- Registered: 50,945 18.1%
- Turnout: 28,861 (56.7%); 0.4 pp

	First party	Second party	Third party
Leader		Basilio Fernández
Party	PP	PFC	CEU
Last election	6 seats, 38.7%	11 seats, 37.3%	2 seats, 9.9%
Seats won	9	6	4
Seat change	3	5	2
Popular vote	8,867	5,778	4,171
Percentage	30.9%	20.1%	14.5%
Swing	7.9 pp	17.2 pp	4.6 pp
	Fourth party	Fifth party	Sixth party
Party	PSOE	PSPC	PDSC
Last election	3 seats, 11.9%	2 seats, 8.2%	Did not contest
Seats won	3	2	1
Seat change	0	0	1
Popular vote	3,770	2,307	1,449
Percentage	13.1%	8.0%	5.0%
Swing	1.2 pp	0.2 pp	New party
Mayor-President before election
Basilio Fernández
PFC
Elected Mayor-President
Basilio Fernández
PFC

The 1995 Ceuta Assembly election was held on Sunday, 28 May 1995, to elect the 1st Assembly of the Autonomous City of Ceuta. All 25 seats in the assembly were up for election. The election was held simultaneously with regional elections in thirteen autonomous communities and local elections all throughout Spain.

== Electoral system ==
The Assembly of Ceuta was the top-tier administrative and governing body of the autonomous city of Ceuta. Voting for the assembly was on the basis of universal suffrage, which comprised all nationals over eighteen, registered and residing in the municipality of Ceuta and in full enjoyment of their political rights, as well as resident non-nationals whose country of origin allowed Spanish nationals to vote in their own elections by virtue of a treaty.

The 25 members of the Assembly of Ceuta were elected using the D'Hondt method and a closed list proportional representation, with a threshold of 5 percent of valid votes—which included blank ballots—being applied. Parties not reaching the threshold were not taken into consideration for seat distribution.

The mayor-president was indirectly elected by the plenary assembly. A legal clause required that mayoral candidates earned the vote of an absolute majority of members, or else the candidate of the most-voted party in the assembly was to be automatically appointed to the post. In case of a tie, a toss-up would determine the appointee.

== Parties and candidates ==
The electoral law allowed for parties and federations registered in the interior ministry, coalitions and groupings of electors to present lists of candidates. Parties and federations intending to form a coalition ahead of an election were required to inform the relevant Electoral Commission within ten days of the election call, whereas groupings of electors needed to secure the signature of at least one percent of the electorate in the constituencies for which they sought election, disallowing electors from signing for more than one list of candidates.

== Results ==
Summary of the 28 May 1995 Assembly of Ceuta election results →
Parties and alliances	Popular vote			Seats	
Parties and alliances	Votes	%	±pp	Total	+/−
People's Party (PP)	8,867	30.85	+7.86	9	+3
Progress and Future of Ceuta (PFC)	5,778	20.11	–17.15	6	–5
United Ceuta (CEU)	4,171	14.51	+4.62	4	+2
Spanish Socialist Workers' Party (PSOE)	3,770	13.12	+1.24	3	±0
Socialist Party of the People of Ceuta (PSPC)	2,307	8.03	–0.14	2	±0
Democratic and Social Party of Ceuta (PDSC)	1,449	5.04	New	1	+1
Muslim Electoral Coalition (CEM)	1,111	3.87	New	0	±0
United Left of Ceuta (IU)	510	1.77	New	0	±0
Ceuta First (CP)	407	1.42	New	0	±0
Ceutan Party (PC)	87	0.30	New	0	±0
Democratic and Social Centre (CDS)	n/a	n/a	–5.03	0	–1
Blank ballots	282	0.98	+0.51		
Total	28,739			25	±0
Valid votes	28,739	99.58	±0.00		
Invalid votes	122	0.42	±0.00		
Votes cast / turnout	28,861	56.65	–2.22		
Abstentions	22,084	43.35	+2.22		
Registered voters	50,945				

Popular vote
PP	30.85%
PFC	20.11%
CEU	14.51%
PSOE	13.12%
PSPC	8.03%
PDSC	5.04%
CEM	3.87%
IU	1.77%
CP	1.42%
PC	0.30%
Blank ballots	0.98%

Seats
PP	36.00%
PFC	24.00%
CEU	16.00%
PSOE	12.00%
PSPC	8.00%
PDSC	4.00%
