= 2007 Ceuta Assembly election =

Election in the Spanish autonomous city of Ceuta

- 27 May 2007

All 25 seats in the Assembly of Ceuta 13 seats needed for a majority
- Opinion polls
- Registered: 57,540 1.5%
- Turnout: 34,693 (60.3%); 1.1 pp

	First party	Second party	Third party
Leader	Juan Jesús Vivas	Mohamed Alí	Antonia Palomo
Party	PP	UDCE–IU	PSOE
Leader since	October 1999	2001	2000
Last election	19 seats, 65.2%	3 seats, 11.7% (Note: Aggregated data for UDCE–IU and PSPC in the 2003 election.)	2 seats, 8.7%
Seats won	19	4	2
Seat change	0	1	0
Popular vote	22,484	5,659	2,985
Percentage	65.2%	16.4%	8.7%
Swing	2.6 pp	4.7 pp	0.0 pp
Mayor-President before election
Juan Jesús Vivas
PP
Elected Mayor-President
Juan Jesús Vivas
PP

The 2007 Ceuta Assembly election was held on Sunday, 27 May 2007, to elect the 4th Assembly of the Autonomous City of Ceuta. All 25 seats in the Assembly were up for election. The election was held simultaneously with regional elections in thirteen autonomous communities and local elections all throughout Spain.

== Electoral system ==
The Assembly of Ceuta was the top-tier administrative and governing body of the autonomous city of Ceuta. Voting for the Assembly was on the basis of universal suffrage, which comprised all nationals over eighteen, registered and residing in the municipality of Ceuta and in full enjoyment of their political rights, as well as resident non-national European citizens and those whose country of origin allowed Spanish nationals to vote in their own elections by virtue of a treaty.

The 25 members of the Assembly of Ceuta were elected using the D'Hondt method and a closed list proportional representation, with a threshold of 5 percent of valid votes—which included blank ballots—being applied. Parties not reaching the threshold were not taken into consideration for seat distribution.

The Mayor-President was indirectly elected by the plenary assembly. A legal clause required that mayoral candidates earned the vote of an absolute majority of members, or else the candidate of the most-voted party in the assembly was to be automatically appointed to the post. In case of a tie, a toss-up would determine the appointee.

== Parties and candidates ==
The electoral law allowed for parties and federations registered in the interior ministry, coalitions and groupings of electors to present lists of candidates. Parties and federations intending to form a coalition ahead of an election were required to inform the relevant Electoral Commission within ten days of the election call, whereas groupings of electors needed to secure the signature of at least one percent of the electorate in the constituencies for which they sought election, disallowing electors from signing for more than one list of candidates.

== Results ==
← Summary of the 27 May 2007 Assembly of Ceuta election results →
Parties and alliances	Popular vote			Seats	
Parties and alliances	Votes	%	±pp	Total	+/−
People's Party (PP)	22,484	65.18	+2.63	19	±0
Ceutan Democratic Union–United Left of Ceuta (UDCE–IU)^{1}	5,659	16.41	+4.71	4	+1
Spanish Socialist Workers' Party (PSOE)	2,985	8.65	–0.05	2	±0
Socialist Party of the People of Ceuta (PSPC)	1,557	4.51	+0.31	0	±0
Democratic and Social Party of Ceuta (PDSC)	1,258	3.65	–1.50	0	–1
The Greens–Green Group of Ceuta (LV–GV)	326	0.95	New	0	±0
Blank ballots	226	0.66	–0.09		
Total	34,495			25	±0
Valid votes	34,495	99.43	–0.13		
Invalid votes	198	0.57	+0.13		
Votes cast / turnout	34,693	60.29	+1.06		
Abstentions	22,847	39.71	–1.06		
Registered voters	57,540				
Sources
Footnotes: ^{1} Ceutan Democratic Union–United Left of Ceuta results are compared to the combined totals of Ceutan Democratic Union and United Left–Ceuta in the 2003 election.

Popular vote
PP	65.18%
UDCE–IU	16.41%
PSOE	8.65%
PSPC	4.51%
PDSC	3.65%
LV–GV	0.95%
Blank ballots	0.66%

Seats
PP	76.00%
UDCE–IU	16.00%
PSOE	8.00%
