= Ceuta (Congress of Deputies constituency) =

Electoral constituency in Spain

Coordinates: 35°53′N 5°18′W

- Congress of Deputies; Electoral constituency
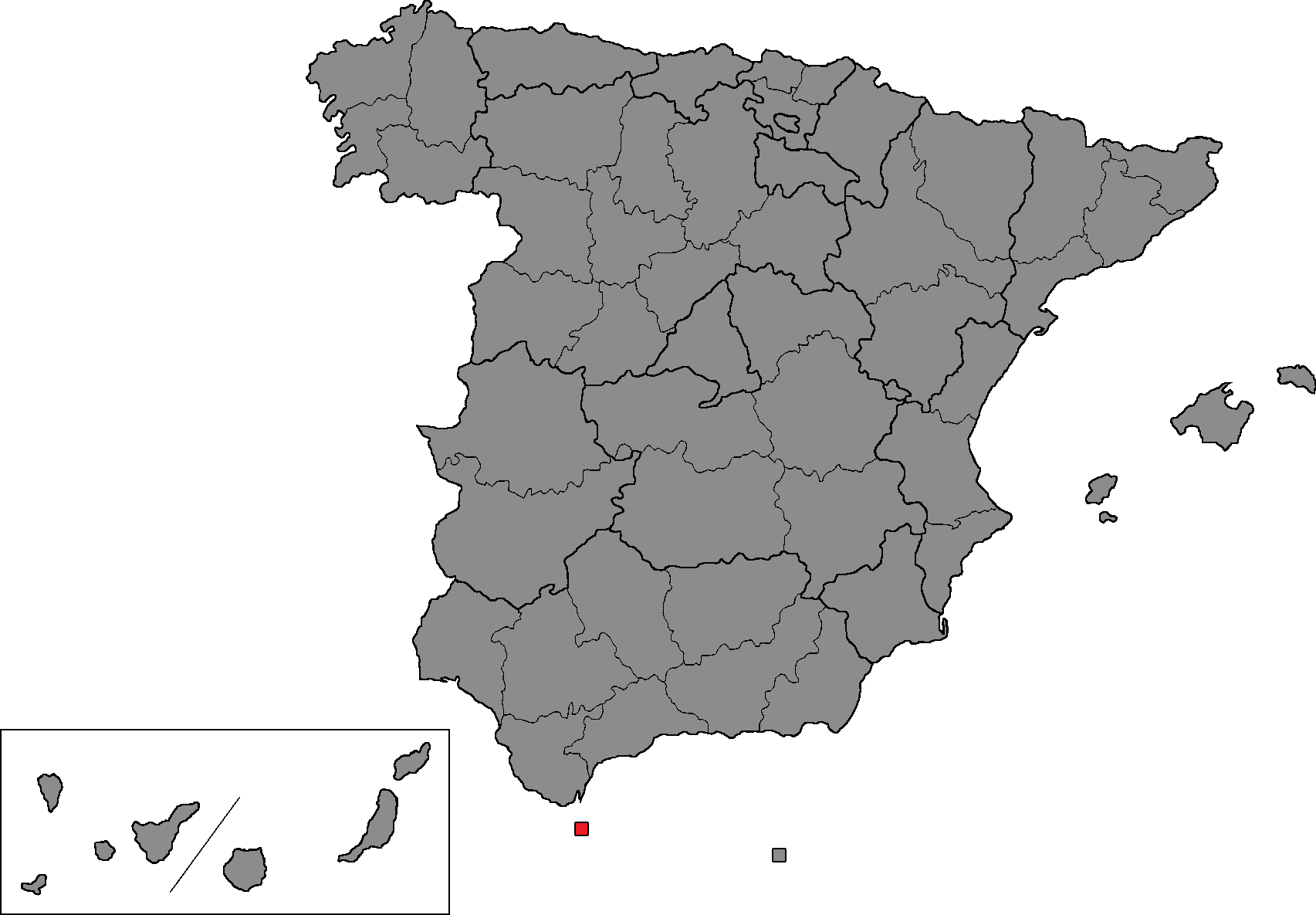
- Location of Ceuta within Spain.
- Province: Cádiz (1977–1995); None (1995–present)
- Autonomous community: Andalusia (1977–1995); None (1995–present)
- Population: ▲83,229 (2024)
- Electorate: ▲63,310 (2023)
- Major settlements: Ceuta

Current constituency
- Created: 1977
- Seats: 1
- Member: PP (1)

Ceuta is one of the 52 constituencies represented in the Congress of Deputies, the lower chamber of the Spanish parliament, the Cortes Generales. The constituency (whose boundaries correspond to those of the homonymous autonomous city) currently elects one deputy using plurality voting.

== Electoral system ==
The constituency was created as per the Political Reform Law and was first contested in the 1977 general election. The Law provided for the provinces of Spain to be established as multi-member districts in the Congress of Deputies, with this regulation being maintained under the Spanish Constitution of 1978. Additionally, the Constitution requires for any modification of the provincial limits to be approved under an organic law, needing an absolute majority in the Cortes Generales.

Voting is based on universal suffrage, comprising all Spanish nationals over 18 years of age with full political rights, provided that they have not been deprived of the right to vote by a final sentence. The only exception was in 1977, when this was limited to nationals over 21 years of age and in full enjoyment of their political and civil rights. Amendments in 2011 required non-resident citizens to apply for voting, a system known as "begged" voting (Spanish: Voto rogado). which was abolished in 2022. Further, amendments in 2018 granted the right to vote to those legally incapacitated. The Congress of Deputies has a minimum of 300 and a maximum of 400 seats, with electoral provisions fixing its size at 350. Of these, 348 are elected in 50 multi-member constituencies corresponding to the provinces of Spain—each of which is assigned an initial minimum of two seats and the remaining 248 distributed in proportion to population—using the D'Hondt method and closed-list proportional voting, with a three percent-threshold of valid votes (including blank ballots) in each constituency. The remaining two seats are allocated to Ceuta and Melilla as single-member districts elected by plurality voting. The use of this electoral method may result in a higher effective threshold depending on district magnitude and vote distribution. The law does not provide for by-elections to fill vacant seats; instead, any vacancies arising after the proclamation of candidates and during the legislative term are filled by the next candidates on the party lists or, when required, by designated substitutes.

The electoral law allows for parties and federations registered in the interior ministry, alliances and groupings of electors to present lists of candidates. Parties and federations intending to form an alliance are required to inform the relevant electoral commission within 10 days of the election call—15 before 1985—whereas groupings of electors need to secure the signature of at least one percent of the electorate in the constituencies for which they seek election—one permille of the electorate, with a compulsory minimum of 500 signatures, until 1985—disallowing electors from signing for more than one list. Also since 2011, parties, federations or alliances that have not obtained a mandate in either chamber of the Cortes at the preceding election are required to secure the signature of at least 0.1 percent of electors in the aforementioned constituencies. Amendments in 2007 required a balanced composition of men and women in the electoral lists, so that candidates of either sex made up at least 40 percent of the total composition; further amendments in 2024 required the use of a zipper system.

== Deputies ==
Deputies 1977–present
Key to parties PSOE UCD PP Vox
Legislature	Election	Distribution
Constituent	1977	1
1st	1979	1
2nd	1982	1
3rd	1986	1
4th	1989	1
5th	1993	1
6th	1996	1
7th	2000	1
8th	2004	1
9th	2008	1
10th	2011	1
11th	2015	1
12th	2016	1
13th	2019 (Apr)	1
14th	2019 (Nov)	1
15th	2023	1

== General elections ==
=== 2026 ===
Summary of the 29 November 2026 Congress of Deputies election results in Ceuta
Parties and alliances	Popular vote			Seats	
Parties and alliances	Votes	%	±pp	Total	+/−
People's Party (PP)					
Spanish Socialist Workers' Party (PSOE)					
Vox (Vox)					
Workers' Front (FO)					
We Can (Podemos. Paz, Casa y Trabajo)			New		
The Party is Over (SALF)			New		
Blank ballots					
Total				1	±0
Valid votes					
Invalid votes					
Votes cast / turnout					
Abstentions					
Registered voters	65,591				

=== 2023 ===
Summary of the 23 July 2023 Congress of Deputies election results in Ceuta
Parties and alliances	Popular vote			Seats	
Parties and alliances	Votes	%	±pp	Total	+/−
People's Party (PP)	12,918	38.77	+16.49	1	+1
Spanish Socialist Workers' Party (PSOE)	11,332	34.01	+2.70	0	±0
Vox (Vox)	7,752	23.26	–11.93	0	–1
Unite (Sumar)^{1}	821	2.46	–1.43	0	±0
Workers' Front (FO)	53	0.16	New	0	±0
Free (LB)	53	0.16	New	0	±0
Zero Cuts (Recortes Cero)	33	0.10	–0.27	0	±0
For a Fairer World (PUM+J)	31	0.09	–0.04	0	±0
Blank ballots	328	0.98	+0.01		
Total	33,321			1	±0
Valid votes	33,321	98.95	–0.01		
Invalid votes	353	1.05	+0.01		
Votes cast / turnout	33,674	53.19	–0.79		
Abstentions	29,636	46.81	+0.79		
Registered voters	63,310				
Sources
Footnotes: ^{1} Unite results are compared to United We Can totals in the November 2019 election.

=== November 2019 ===
Summary of the 10 November 2019 Congress of Deputies election results in Ceuta
Parties and alliances	Popular vote			Seats	
Parties and alliances	Votes	%	±pp	Total	+/−
Vox (Vox)	11,752	35.19	+11.26	1	+1
Spanish Socialist Workers' Party (PSOE)	10,455	31.31	–5.01	0	–1
People's Party (PP)	7,439	22.28	+0.84	0	±0
United We Can (Podemos–IU)	1,300	3.89	–0.95	0	±0
Citizens–Party of the Citizenry (Cs)	1,138	3.41	–8.56	0	±0
Movement for Dignity and Citizenship (MDyC)	819	2.45	New	0	±0
Zero Cuts–Green Group (Recortes Cero–GV)	125	0.37	–0.04	0	±0
For a Fairer World (PUM+J)	43	0.13	–0.10	0	±0
Blank ballots	324	0.97	+0.12		
Total	33,395			1	±0
Valid votes	33,395	98.96	+0.15		
Invalid votes	351	1.04	–0.15		
Votes cast / turnout	33,746	53.98	–7.46		
Abstentions	28,767	46.02	+7.46		
Registered voters	62,513				

=== April 2019 ===
Summary of the 28 April 2019 Congress of Deputies election results in Ceuta
Parties and alliances	Popular vote			Seats	
Parties and alliances	Votes	%	±pp	Total	+/−
Spanish Socialist Workers' Party (PSOE)	13,800	36.32	+13.70	1	+1
Vox (Vox)	9,092	23.93	+23.48	0	±0
People's Party (PP)	8,147	21.44	–30.42	0	–1
Citizens–Party of the Citizenry (Cs)	4,546	11.97	+0.46	0	±0
United We Can (Podemos–IU–Equo)	1,838	4.84	–6.01	0	±0
Zero Cuts–Green Group (Recortes Cero–GV)	157	0.41	+0.03	0	±0
For a Fairer World (PUM+J)	87	0.23	New	0	±0
Blank ballots	324	0.85	–0.17		
Total	37,991			1	±0
Valid votes	37,991	98.81	–0.05		
Invalid votes	459	1.19	+0.05		
Votes cast / turnout	38,450	61.44	+10.79		
Abstentions	24,130	38.56	–10.79		
Registered voters	62,580				

=== 2016 ===
Summary of the 26 June 2016 Congress of Deputies election results in Ceuta
Parties and alliances	Popular vote			Seats	
Parties and alliances	Votes	%	±pp	Total	+/−
People's Party (PP)	15,991	51.86	+7.00	1	±0
Spanish Socialist Workers' Party (PSOE)	6,974	22.62	–0.48	0	±0
Citizens–Party of the Citizenry (C's)	3,549	11.51	–1.79	0	±0
United We Can (Podemos–IU–Equo)^{1}	3,345	10.85	–4.53	0	±0
Animalist Party Against Mistreatment of Animals (PACMA)	333	1.08	±0.00	0	±0
Vox (Vox)	139	0.45	New	0	±0
Zero Cuts–Green Group (Recortes Cero–GV)	118	0.38	–0.06	0	±0
Union, Progress and Democracy (UPyD)	72	0.23	–0.37	0	±0
Blank ballots	316	1.02	–0.23		
Total	30,837			1	±0
Valid votes	30,837	98.86	+0.33		
Invalid votes	357	1.14	–0.33		
Votes cast / turnout	31,194	50.65	–3.19		
Abstentions	30,393	49.35	+3.19		
Registered voters	61,587				
Sources
Footnotes: ^{1} United We Can results are compared to the combined totals of We Can and United Left–Popular Unity in Common in the 2015 election.

=== 2015 ===
Summary of the 20 December 2015 Congress of Deputies election results in Ceuta
Parties and alliances	Popular vote			Seats	
Parties and alliances	Votes	%	±pp	Total	+/−
People's Party (PP)	14,813	44.86	–21.07	1	±0
Spanish Socialist Workers' Party (PSOE)	7,627	23.10	+2.84	0	±0
We Can (Podemos)	4,646	14.07	New	0	±0
Citizens–Party of the Citizenry (C's)	4,392	13.30	New	0	±0
United Left–Popular Unity in Common (IU–UPeC)	431	1.31	–0.50	0	±0
Animalist Party Against Mistreatment of Animals (PACMA)	358	1.08	+0.50	0	±0
Union, Progress and Democracy (UPyD)	197	0.60	–2.74	0	±0
Zero Cuts–Green Group (Recortes Cero–GV)	146	0.44	New	0	±0
Blank ballots	413	1.25	–0.32		
Total	33,023			1	±0
Valid votes	33,023	98.53	+0.01		
Invalid votes	493	1.47	–0.01		
Votes cast / turnout	33,516	54.36	+1.20		
Abstentions	28,144	45.64	–1.20		
Registered voters	61,660				

=== 2011 ===
Summary of the 20 November 2011 Congress of Deputies election results in Ceuta
Parties and alliances	Popular vote			Seats	
Parties and alliances	Votes	%	±pp	Total	+/−
People's Party (PP)	20,968	65.93	+10.82	1	±0
Spanish Socialist Workers' Party (PSOE)	6,445	20.26	–20.21	0	±0
Caballas Coalition (Caballas)	1,712	5.38	New	0	±0
Union, Progress and Democracy (UPyD)	1,061	3.34	+2.02	0	±0
United Left–Democratic and Social Party of Ceuta: Plural Left (IU–PDSC)	576	1.81	+1.14	0	±0
The Greens–Green Group (LV–GV)	293	0.92	+0.32	0	±0
Animalist Party Against Mistreatment of Animals (PACMA)	186	0.58	+0.31	0	±0
For a Fairer World (PUM+J)	65	0.20	+0.08	0	±0
Blank ballots	498	1.57	+0.63		
Total	31,804			1	±0
Valid votes	31,804	98.52	–0.82		
Invalid votes	478	1.48	+0.82		
Votes cast / turnout	32,282	53.16	–10.16		
Abstentions	28,441	46.84	+10.16		
Registered voters	60,723				

=== 2008 ===
Summary of the 9 March 2008 Congress of Deputies election results in Ceuta
Parties and alliances	Popular vote			Seats	
Parties and alliances	Votes	%	±pp	Total	+/−
People's Party (PP)	20,040	55.11	–4.13	1	±0
Spanish Socialist Workers' Party (PSOE)	14,716	40.47	+4.69	0	±0
Union, Progress and Democracy (UPyD)	481	1.32	New	0	±0
United Left of Ceuta (IU)	244	0.67	+0.06	0	±0
The Greens–Green Group (LV–GV)	220	0.60	New	0	±0
Anti-Bullfighting Party Against Mistreatment of Animals (PACMA)	104	0.29	New	0	±0
Social Democratic Party (PSD)	67	0.18	New	0	±0
Spanish Phalanx of the CNSO (FE de las JONS)	58	0.16	New	0	±0
For a Fairer World (PUM+J)	42	0.12	New	0	±0
Citizens–Party of the Citizenry (C's)	32	0.09	New	0	±0
Spanish Alternative (AES)	18	0.05	New	0	±0
Blank ballots	342	0.94	–0.50		
Total	36,364			1	±0
Valid votes	36,364	99.34	+0.23		
Invalid votes	241	0.66	–0.23		
Votes cast / turnout	36,605	63.32	–0.13		
Abstentions	21,200	36.68	+0.13		
Registered voters	57,805				

=== 2004 ===
Summary of the 14 March 2004 Congress of Deputies election results in Ceuta
Parties and alliances	Popular vote			Seats	
Parties and alliances	Votes	%	±pp	Total	+/−
People's Party (PP)	21,142	59.24	+11.65	1	±0
Spanish Socialist Workers' Party (PSOE)	12,769	35.78	+17.78	0	±0
Socialist Party of the People of Ceuta (PSPC)	807	2.26	–0.32	0	±0
United Left (IU)	218	0.61	–0.14	0	±0
The Phalanx (FE)	116	0.33	+0.03	0	±0
National Democracy (DN)	62	0.17	New	0	±0
Republican Left (IR)	37	0.10	New	0	±0
Spanish Democratic Party (PADE)	25	0.07	–0.01	0	±0
Blank ballots	515	1.44	–0.19		
Total	35,691			1	±0
Valid votes	35,691	99.11	+0.08		
Invalid votes	319	0.89	–0.08		
Votes cast / turnout	36,010	63.45	+8.30		
Abstentions	20,741	36.55	–8.30		
Registered voters	56,751				

=== 2000 ===
Summary of the 12 March 2000 Congress of Deputies election results in Ceuta
Parties and alliances	Popular vote			Seats	
Parties and alliances	Votes	%	±pp	Total	+/−
People's Party (PP)	14,514	47.59	–5.62	1	±0
Liberal Independent Group (GIL)	8,758	28.71	New	0	±0
Spanish Socialist Workers' Party–Progressives (PSOE–p)	5,491	18.00	–17.79	0	±0
Socialist Party of the People of Ceuta (PSPC)	788	2.58	–4.70	0	±0
United Left (IU)	229	0.75	–1.46	0	±0
The Phalanx (FE)	93	0.30	New	0	±0
Natural Law Party (PLN)	76	0.25	New	0	±0
Democratic and Social Centre–Centrist Union (CDS–UC)	31	0.10	New	0	±0
Spanish Democratic Party (PADE)	24	0.08	New	0	±0
Blank ballots	497	1.63	+0.41		
Total	30,501			1	±0
Valid votes	30,501	99.03	+0.23		
Invalid votes	300	0.97	–0.23		
Votes cast / turnout	30,801	55.15	–8.66		
Abstentions	25,047	44.85	+8.66		
Registered voters	55,848				

=== 1996 ===
Summary of the 3 March 1996 Congress of Deputies election results in Ceuta
Parties and alliances	Popular vote			Seats	
Parties and alliances	Votes	%	±pp	Total	+/−
People's Party (PP)	17,288	53.21	+2.28	1	±0
Spanish Socialist Workers' Party (PSOE)	11,627	35.79	–4.79	0	±0
Socialist Party of the People of Ceuta (PSPC)	2,365	7.28	+3.43	0	±0
United Left (IU)	718	2.21	New	0	±0
Workers' Revolutionary Party (PRT)^{1}	56	0.17	–0.16	0	±0
Humanist Party (PH)	41	0.13	New	0	±0
Blank ballots	395	1.22	+0.45		
Total	32,490			1	±0
Valid votes	32,490	99.26	–0.24		
Invalid votes	242	0.74	+0.24		
Votes cast / turnout	32,732	63.81	+1.68		
Abstentions	18,566	36.19	–1.68		
Registered voters	51,298				
Sources
Footnotes: ^{1} Workers' Revolutionary Party results are compared to Workers' Socialist Party totals in the 1993 election.

=== 1993 ===
Summary of the 6 June 1993 Congress of Deputies election results in Ceuta
Parties and alliances	Popular vote			Seats	
Parties and alliances	Votes	%	±pp	Total	+/−
People's Party (PP)	15,276	50.93	+17.31	1	+1
Spanish Socialist Workers' Party (PSOE)	12,170	40.58	+2.87	0	–1
Socialist Party of the People of Ceuta (PSPC)	1,155	3.85	New	0	±0
The Greens (LV)^{1}	491	1.64	–1.66	0	±0
Democratic and Social Centre (CDS)	485	1.62	–6.58	0	±0
Workers' Socialist Party (PST)	100	0.33	–0.32	0	±0
Natural Law Party (PLN)	43	0.14	New	0	±0
Initiative for Ceuta (INCE)	42	0.14	New	0	±0
Communist Unification of Spain (UCE)	0	0.00	New	0	±0
Blank ballots	231	0.77	–0.41		
Total	29,993			1	±0
Valid votes	29,993	99.50	+0.42		
Invalid votes	152	0.50	–0.42		
Votes cast / turnout	30,145	62.13	+6.19		
Abstentions	18,372	37.87	–6.19		
Registered voters	48,517				
Sources
Footnotes: ^{1} The Greens results are compared to The Greens–Green List totals in the 1989 election.

=== 1989 ===
Summary of the 29 October 1989 Congress of Deputies election results in Ceuta
Parties and alliances	Popular vote			Seats	
Parties and alliances	Votes	%	±pp	Total	+/−
Spanish Socialist Workers' Party (PSOE)	8,643	37.71	–7.52	1	±0
People's Party (PP)^{1}	7,855	34.27	–2.07	0	±0
United Ceuta (CEU)	2,760	12.04	New	0	±0
Democratic and Social Centre (CDS)	1,880	8.20	+0.23	0	±0
The Greens–Green List (LV–LV)	756	3.30	New	0	±0
Ruiz-Mateos Group (Ruiz-Mateos)	605	2.64	New	0	±0
Workers' Socialist Party (PST)	150	0.65	+0.17	0	±0
Blank ballots	270	1.18	+0.62		
Total	22,919			1	±0
Valid votes	22,919	99.08	+0.42		
Invalid votes	212	0.92	–0.42		
Votes cast / turnout	23,131	55.94	–0.76		
Abstentions	18,222	44.06	+0.76		
Registered voters	41,353				
Sources
Footnotes: ^{1} People's Party results are compared to People's Coalition totals in the 1986 election.

=== 1986 ===
Summary of the 22 June 1986 Congress of Deputies election results in Ceuta
Parties and alliances	Popular vote			Seats	
Parties and alliances	Votes	%	±pp	Total	+/−
Spanish Socialist Workers' Party (PSOE)	10,937	45.23	–0.31	1	±0
People's Coalition (AP–PDP–PL)^{1}	8,788	36.34	+6.47	0	±0
Democratic and Social Centre (CDS)	1,928	7.97	+0.15	0	±0
Candidacy for Autonomy (CA)	758	3.13	New	0	±0
Electoral Group–Independent Group of Ceuta (AE–AIC)	601	2.49	New	0	±0
Democratic Reformist Party (PRD)	499	2.06	New	0	±0
United Left (IU)^{2}	351	1.45	+0.72	0	±0
Workers' Socialist Party (PST)	117	0.48	–0.05	0	±0
Communist Unification of Spain (UCE)	66	0.27	+0.20	0	±0
Blank ballots	136	0.56	+0.10		
Total	24,181			1	±0
Valid votes	24,181	98.66	–0.09		
Invalid votes	329	1.34	+0.09		
Votes cast / turnout	24,510	56.70	–15.59		
Abstentions	18,720	43.30	+15.59		
Registered voters	43,230				
Sources
Footnotes: ^{1} People's Coalition results are compared to People's Alliance–People's Democratic Party totals in the 1982 election.; ^{2} United Left results are compared to Communist Party of Spain totals in the 1982 election.

=== 1982 ===
Summary of the 28 October 1982 Congress of Deputies election results in Ceuta
Parties and alliances	Popular vote			Seats	
Parties and alliances	Votes	%	±pp	Total	+/−
Spanish Socialist Workers' Party (PSOE)	11,698	45.54	+10.23	1	+1
People's Alliance–People's Democratic Party (AP–PDP)^{1}	7,674	29.87	+22.01	0	±0
Democratic and Social Centre (CDS)	2,010	7.82	New	0	±0
Union of the Democratic Centre (UCD)	1,870	7.28	–44.59	0	–1
Nationalist Party of Ceuta (PNCe)	1,785	6.95	New	0	±0
Communist Party of Spain (PCE)	188	0.73	New	0	±0
New Force (FN)^{2}	173	0.67	–2.79	0	±0
Workers' Socialist Party (PST)	137	0.53	New	0	±0
Communist Unification of Spain (UCE)	19	0.07	New	0	±0
Communist Movement (MC)	17	0.07	–0.36	0	±0
Blank ballots	119	0.46	–0.07		
Total	25,690			1	±0
Valid votes	25,690	98.37	–0.51		
Invalid votes	427	1.63	+0.51		
Votes cast / turnout	26,117	72.29	+6.85		
Abstentions	10,011	27.71	–6.85		
Registered voters	36,128				
Sources
Footnotes: ^{1} People's Alliance–People's Democratic Party results are compared to Democratic Coalition totals in the 1979 election.; ^{2} New Force results are compared to National Union totals in the 1979 election.

=== 1979 ===
Summary of the 1 March 1979 Congress of Deputies election results in Ceuta
Parties and alliances	Popular vote			Seats	
Parties and alliances	Votes	%	±pp	Total	+/−
Union of the Democratic Centre (UCD)	11,020	51.87	+15.61	1	±0
Spanish Socialist Workers' Party (PSOE)^{1}	7,502	35.31	–8.54	0	±0
Democratic Coalition (CD)^{2}	1,669	7.86	–4.14	0	±0
National Union (UN)	735	3.46	New	0	±0
Workers' Revolutionary Organization (ORT)	115	0.54	New	0	±0
Communist Movement–Organization of Communist Left (MC–OIC)	91	0.43	New	0	±0
Blank ballots	112	0.53	+0.25		
Total	21,244			1	±0
Valid votes	21,244	98.88	+0.05		
Invalid votes	240	1.12	–0.05		
Votes cast / turnout	21,484	65.44	–12.16		
Abstentions	11,347	34.56	+12.16		
Registered voters	32,831				
Sources
Footnotes: ^{1} Spanish Socialist Workers' Party results are compared to the combined totals of Spanish Socialist Workers' Party and People's Socialist Party–Socialist Unity in the 1977 election.; ^{2} Democratic Coalition results are compared to Action for Ceuta totals in the 1977 election.

=== 1977 ===
Summary of the 15 June 1977 Congress of Deputies election results in Ceuta
Parties and alliances	Popular vote			Seats	
Parties and alliances	Votes	%	±pp	Total	+/−
Union of the Democratic Centre (UCD)	8,808	36.26	n/a	1	n/a
Spanish Socialist Workers' Party (PSOE)	7,886	32.47	n/a	0	n/a
Action for Ceuta (APC)	2,915	12.00	n/a	0	n/a
People's Socialist Party–Socialist Unity (PSP–US)	2,763	11.38	n/a	0	n/a
Association of Ceuta Electors (ADEC)	1,099	4.52	n/a	0	n/a
Spanish Social Reform (RSE)	752	3.10	n/a	0	n/a
Blank ballots	67	0.28	n/a		
Total	24,290			1	n/a
Valid votes	24,290	98.83	n/a		
Invalid votes	288	1.17	n/a		
Votes cast / turnout	24,578	77.60	n/a		
Abstentions	7,094	22.40	n/a		
Registered voters	31,672				

== Bibliography ==
- Ley 1/1977, de 4 de enero, para la Reforma Política (Fundamental Law 1/1977). Official State Gazette (in Spanish). 4 January 1977. BOE-A-1977-165.
- Real Decreto-ley 20/1977, de 18 de marzo, sobre Normas Electorales (Royal Decree-Law 20/1977). Official State Gazette (in Spanish). 18 March 1977. BOE-A-1977-7445.
- Constitución Española (Constitution). Official State Gazette (in Spanish). 27 December 1978. BOE-A-1978-31229.
- Ley Orgánica 5/1985, de 19 de junio, del Régimen Electoral General (Organic Law 5/1985). Official State Gazette (in Spanish). 19 June 1985. BOE-A-1985-11672.
- Carreras de Odriozola, Albert; Tafunell Sambola, Xavier (2005) [1989]. Estadísticas históricas de España, siglos XIX-XX (PDF) (in Spanish). Vol. 1 (II ed.). Bilbao: Fundación BBVA. pp. 1072–1097. ISBN 84-96515-00-1. Archived from the original (PDF) on 24 September 2015.
