= 1999 Ceuta Assembly election =

Election in the Spanish autonomous city of Ceuta

- 13 Jun 1999

All 25 seats in the Assembly of Ceuta 13 seats needed for a majority
- Opinion polls
- Registered: 54,609 7.2%
- Turnout: 33,505 (61.4%); 4.7 pp

	First party	Second party	Third party
Leader	Antonio Sampietro	Juan Jesús Vivas
Party	GIL	PP	PDSC
Leader since		October 1999
Last election	Did not contest	9 seats, 30.9%	1 seats, 5.0%
Seats won	12	8	3
Seat change	12	1	2
Popular vote	12,721	9,334	3,340
Percentage	38.2%	28.0%	10.0%
Swing	New party	2.9 pp	5.0 pp
	Fourth party
Leader	Alberto Núñez Thome
Party	PSOE
Last election	3 seats, 13.1%
Seats won	2
Seat change	1
Popular vote	2,481
Percentage	7.4%
Swing	5.7 pp
Mayor-President before election
Jesús Cayetano Fortes Ramos
PP
Elected Mayor-President
Jesús Cayetano Fortes Ramos
PP

The 1999 Ceuta Assembly election was held on Sunday, 13 June 1999, to elect the 2nd Assembly of the Autonomous City of Ceuta. All 25 seats in the Assembly were up for election. The election was held simultaneously with regional elections in thirteen autonomous communities and local elections all throughout Spain, as well as the 1999 European Parliament election.

== Electoral system ==
The Assembly of Ceuta was the top-tier administrative and governing body of the autonomous city of Ceuta. Voting for the Assembly was on the basis of universal suffrage, which comprised all nationals over eighteen, registered and residing in the municipality of Ceuta and in full enjoyment of their political rights, as well as resident non-national European citizens and those whose country of origin allowed Spanish nationals to vote in their own elections by virtue of a treaty.

The 25 members of the Assembly of Ceuta were elected using the D'Hondt method and a closed list proportional representation, with a threshold of 5 percent of valid votes—which included blank ballots—being applied. Parties not reaching the threshold were not taken into consideration for seat distribution.

The Mayor-President was indirectly elected by the plenary assembly. A legal clause required that mayoral candidates earned the vote of an absolute majority of members, or else the candidate of the most-voted party in the assembly was to be automatically appointed to the post. In case of a tie, a toss-up would determine the appointee.

== Parties and candidates ==
The electoral law allowed for parties and federations registered in the interior ministry, coalitions and groupings of electors to present lists of candidates. Parties and federations intending to form a coalition ahead of an election were required to inform the relevant Electoral Commission within ten days of the election call, whereas groupings of electors needed to secure the signature of at least one percent of the electorate in the constituencies for which they sought election, disallowing electors from signing for more than one list of candidates.

== Results ==
← Summary of the 13 June 1999 Assembly of Ceuta election results →
Parties and alliances	Popular vote			Seats	
Parties and alliances	Votes	%	±pp	Total	+/−
Liberal Independent Group (GIL)	12,721	38.15	New	12	+12
People's Party (PP)	9,334	27.99	–2.86	8	–1
Democratic and Social Party of Ceuta (PDSC)	3,340	10.02	+4.98	3	+2
Spanish Socialist Workers' Party (PSOE)	2,481	7.44	–5.68	2	–1
Socialist Party of the People of Ceuta (PSPC)	1,467	4.40	–3.63	0	–2
United Left of Ceuta (IU)	1,321	3.96	+2.19	0	±0
United Ceuta (CEU)	1,297	3.89	–10.62	0	–4
Progress and Future of Ceuta (PFC)	625	1.87	–18.24	0	–6
Ceutan Party (PC)	356	1.07	+0.77	0	±0
Blank ballots	400	1.20	+0.22		
Total	33,342			25	±0
Valid votes	33,342	99.51	–0.07		
Invalid votes	163	0.49	+0.07		
Votes cast / turnout	33,505	61.35	+4.70		
Abstentions	21,104	38.65	–4.70		
Registered voters	54,609				

Popular vote
GIL	38.15%
PP	27.99%
PDSC	10.02%
PSOE	7.44%
PSPC	4.40%
IU	3.96%
CEU	3.89%
PFC	1.87%
PC	1.07%
Blank ballots	1.20%

Seats
GIL	48.00%
PP	32.00%
PDSC	12.00%
PSOE	8.00%
