= 2003 Ceuta Assembly election =

Election in the Spanish autonomous city of Ceuta

← 1999	25 May 2003	2007 →

All 25 seats in the Assembly of Ceuta 13 seats needed for a majority
- Opinion polls
- Registered: 56,656 3.6%
- Turnout: 33,555 (59.2%); 2.2 pp

	First party	Second party	Third party
Leader	Juan Jesús Vivas	Mohamed Alí	Antonia Palomo
Party	PP	UDCE	PSOE
Leader since	October 1999	2001	2000
Last election	8 seats, 28.0%	Did not contest	2 seats, 8.7%
Seats won	19	3	2
Seat change	11	3	0
Popular vote	20,897	3,589	2,905
Percentage	62.6%	10.7%	7.4%
Swing	34.6 pp	New party	1.3 pp
	Fourth party
Party	PDSC
Last election	3 seats, 10.0%
Seats won	1
Seat change	2
Popular vote	1,722
Percentage	5.2%
Swing	4.9 pp
Mayor-President before election
Juan Jesús Vivas
PP
Elected Mayor-President
Juan Jesús Vivas
PP

The 2003 Ceuta Assembly election was held on Sunday, 25 May 2003, to elect the 3rd Assembly of the Autonomous City of Ceuta. All 25 seats in the Assembly were up for election. The election was held simultaneously with regional elections in thirteen autonomous communities and local elections all throughout Spain.

== Electoral system ==
The Assembly of Ceuta was the top-tier administrative and governing body of the autonomous city of Ceuta. Voting for the Assembly was on the basis of universal suffrage, which comprised all nationals over eighteen, registered and residing in the municipality of Ceuta and in full enjoyment of their political rights, as well as resident non-national European citizens and those whose country of origin allowed Spanish nationals to vote in their own elections by virtue of a treaty.

The 25 members of the Assembly of Ceuta were elected using the D'Hondt method and a closed list proportional representation, with a threshold of 5 percent of valid votes—which included blank ballots—being applied. Parties not reaching the threshold were not taken into consideration for seat distribution.

The Mayor-President was indirectly elected by the plenary assembly. A legal clause required that mayoral candidates earned the vote of an absolute majority of members, or else the candidate of the most-voted party in the assembly was to be automatically appointed to the post. In case of a tie, a toss-up would determine the appointee.

== Parties and candidates ==
The electoral law allowed for parties and federations registered in the interior ministry, coalitions and groupings of electors to present lists of candidates. Parties and federations intending to form a coalition ahead of an election were required to inform the relevant Electoral Commission within ten days of the election call, whereas groupings of electors needed to secure the signature of at least one percent of the electorate in the constituencies for which they sought election, disallowing electors from signing for more than one list of candidates.

== Results ==
← Summary of the 25 May 2003 Assembly of Ceuta election results →
Parties and alliances	Popular vote			Seats	
Parties and alliances	Votes	%	±pp	Total	+/−
People's Party (PP)	20,897	62.55	+34.56	19	+11
Ceutan Democratic Union (UDCE)	3,589	10.74	New	3	+3
Spanish Socialist Workers' Party (PSOE)	2,905	8.70	+1.26	2	±0
Democratic and Social Party of Ceuta (PDSC)	1,722	5.15	–4.87	1	–2
Socialist Party of the People of Ceuta (PSPC)	1,402	4.20	–0.20	0	±0
Liberal Independent Party of Ceuta (PIL)^{1}	922	2.76	–35.39	0	–12
Ceutan Federation (FC)	696	2.08	New	0	±0
Ceutan People's Union (UPCE)	573	1.72	New	0	±0
United Left–Ceuta (IU)	322	0.96	–3.00	0	±0
The Phalanx (FE)	129	0.39	New	0	±0
Blank ballots	251	0.75	–0.45		
Total	33,408			25	±0
Valid votes	33,408	99.56	+0.05		
Invalid votes	147	0.44	–0.05		
Votes cast / turnout	33,555	59.23	–2.12		
Abstentions	23,101	40.77	+2.12		
Registered voters	56,656				
Sources
Footnotes: ^{1} Liberal Independent Party of Ceuta results are compared to Liberal Independent Group totals in the 1999 election.

Popular vote
PP	62.55%
UDCE	10.74%
PSOE	8.70%
PDSC	5.15%
PSPC	4.20%
PIL	2.76%
FC	2.08%
UPCE	1.72%
Others	1.35%
Blank ballots	0.75%

Seats
PP	76.00%
UDCE	12.00%
PSOE	8.00%
PDSC	4.00%
