= 1995 Spanish regional elections =

- 28 May 1995; 19 November 1995

921 seats in the regional parliaments of Aragon, Asturias, Balearic Islands, Canary Islands, Cantabria, Castile and León, Castilla–La Mancha, Catalonia, Extremadura, La Rioja, Madrid, Murcia, Navarre and Valencian Community
Regional administrations by leading party in 1995
National parties
PP (10+1)
PSOE (4)
Regional parties
CiU (1)
EAJ/PNV (1)
CC (1)
PFC (0+1)

Regional elections were held in Spain during 1995 to elect the regional parliaments of fourteen of the seventeen autonomous communities: Aragon, Asturias, the Balearic Islands, the Canary Islands, Cantabria, Castile and León, Castilla–La Mancha, Catalonia, Extremadura, La Rioja, Madrid, Murcia, Navarre and the Valencian Community. 921 of 1,180 seats in the regional parliaments were up for election. The elections were held on 28 May for most regions (concurrently with local elections all across the country) and on 19 November in Catalonia.

== Election date ==
Determination of election day varied depending on the autonomous community. Typically, most autonomous communities held their elections on the fourth Sunday of May every four years, concurrently with nationwide local elections, while others had their own, separate electoral cycles. In some cases, regional presidents had the prerogative to dissolve parliament and call for extra elections at a different time, but newly elected assemblies were restricted to serving out what remained of their previous four year-terms without altering the period to their next ordinary election. In other cases—Andalusia (since 1994), the Basque Country (1981), Catalonia (1985) and Galicia (1985)—the law granted regional presidents the power to call snap elections resulting in fresh four-year parliamentary terms.

== Regional governments ==
The following table lists party control in autonomous communities. Gains for a party are highlighted in that party's colour.

Election day	Region	Previous control	New control
28 May	Aragon	Spanish Socialist Workers' Party (PSOE)	People's Party (PP)
28 May	Asturias	Spanish Socialist Workers' Party (PSOE)	People's Party (PP) (URAS in 1998)
28 May	Balearics	People's Party (PP)	People's Party (PP)
28 May	Canary Islands	Canarian Coalition (CC)	Canarian Coalition (CC)
28 May	Cantabria	Union for the Progress of Cantabria (UPCA)	People's Party (PP)
28 May	Castile and León	People's Party (PP)	People's Party (PP)
28 May	Castilla–La Mancha	Spanish Socialist Workers' Party (PSOE)	Spanish Socialist Workers' Party (PSOE)
28 May	Extremadura	Spanish Socialist Workers' Party (PSOE)	Spanish Socialist Workers' Party (PSOE)
28 May	La Rioja	Spanish Socialist Workers' Party (PSOE)	People's Party (PP)
28 May	Madrid	Spanish Socialist Workers' Party (PSOE)	People's Party (PP)
28 May	Murcia	Spanish Socialist Workers' Party (PSOE)	People's Party (PP)
28 May	Navarre	Navarrese People's Union (UPN)	Spanish Socialist Workers' Party (PSOE) (UPN in 1996)
28 May	Valencian Community	Spanish Socialist Workers' Party (PSOE)	People's Party (PP)
19 November	Catalonia	Convergence and Union (CiU)	Convergence and Union (CiU)

== Summary by region ==
=== May (13 regions) ===
==== Aragon ====
Parties and alliances	Votes	%	±pp	Seats	+/−
PP	263,524	37.50	+16.82	27	+10
PSOE	180,728	25.72	−14.62	19	−11
PAR	143,573	20.43	−4.25	14	−3
IU	64,685	9.20	+2.46	5	+2
CHA	34,077	4.85	+2.55	2	+2
Others	5,059	0.72		0	±0
Blank ballots	11,098	1.58	+0.28		
Valid votes	702,744	99.40	+0.10		
Invalid votes	4,210	0.60	−0.10		
Votes cast / turnout	706,954	71.12	+6.73		
Registered voters	993,975				

==== Asturias ====
Parties and alliances	Votes	%	±pp	Seats	+/−
PP	272,495	42.00	+11.60	21	+6
PSOE	219,527	33.83	−7.19	17	−4
IU	106,538	16.42	+1.57	6	±0
PAS	20,669	3.19	+0.45	1	±0
CA–CDS	11,555	1.78	−4.97	0	−2
Others	10,381	1.60		0	±0
Blank ballots	7,655	1.18	−0.05		
Valid votes	648,820	99.41	+0.16		
Invalid votes	3,820	0.59	−0.16		
Votes cast / turnout	652,640	69.05	+10.36		
Registered voters	945,105				

==== Balearics ====
Parties and alliances	Votes	%	±pp	Seats	+/−
PP	168,156	44.77	−2.35	30	−1
PSIB–PSOE	90,008	23.97	−6.12	16	−5
PSM–ENE	45,854	12.21	+3.79	6	+1
IU	24,820	6.61	+4.33	3	+3
UM	19,966	5.32	+2.83	2	+1
EVIB	11,663	3.11	+0.99	1	+1
FIEF	1,359	0.36	−0.37	0	−1
AIPF	1,195	0.32	−0.08	1	+1
Others	7,451	1.98		0	±0
Blank ballots	5,100	1.36	+0.49		
Valid votes	375,572	99.37	−0.01		
Invalid votes	2,371	0.63	+0.01		
Votes cast / turnout	377,943	63.56	+3.29		
Registered voters	594,666				

==== Canary Islands ====
Parties and alliances	Votes	%	±pp	Seats	+/−
CC	261,424	32.80	−1.33	21	+4
PP	247,609	31.07	+18.24	18	+12
PSOE	183,969	23.08	−9.95	16	−7
IUC	40,614	5.10	New	0	±0
PCN	23,914	3.00	+0.43	4	−2
CGC	10,964	1.38	New	0	±0
CDS–UC	5,340	0.67	−13.74	0	−7
AHI	2,105	0.26	+0.05	1	±0
Others	12,042	1.51		0	±0
Blank ballots	9,078	1.14	+0.37		
Valid votes	797,059	99.43	+0.16		
Invalid votes	4,548	0.57	−0.16		
Votes cast / turnout	801,607	64.20	+2.51		
Registered voters	1,248,575				

==== Cantabria ====
Parties and alliances	Votes	%	±pp	Seats	+/−
PP	104,008	32.50	+18.06	13	+7
PSOE	80,464	25.14	−9.67	10	−6
UPCA	53,191	16.62	−16.91	7	−8
PRC	46,587	14.56	+8.21	6	+4
IU	23,563	7.36	+2.96	3	+3
Others	6,033	1.89		0	±0
Blank ballots	6,186	1.93	+0.24		
valid votes	320,032	99.19	+0.04		
Invalid votes	2,622	0.81	−0.04		
Votes cast / turnout	322,654	74.05	+1.71		
Registered voters	435,752				

==== Castile and León ====
Parties and alliances	Votes	%	±pp	Seats	+/−
PP	805,553	52.20	+8.69	50	+7
PSOE	458,447	29.71	−6.73	27	−8
IU	147,777	9.58	+4.22	5	+4
UPL	39,425	2.55	+1.72	2	+2
CDS	n/a	n/a	−8.14	0	−5
Others	63,578	4.12		0	±0
Blank ballots	28,284	1.83	+0.17		
Valid votes	1,543,064	99.11	+0.04		
Invalid votes	13,911	0.89	−0.04		
Votes cast / turnout	1,556,975	73.46	+5.89		
Registered voters	2,119,498				

==== Castilla–La Mancha ====
Parties and alliances	Votes	%	±pp	Seats	+/−
PSOE	483,888	45.70	−6.47	24	−3
PP	469,127	44.30	+8.45	22	+3
IU–ICAM	80,482	7.60	+1.43	1	±0
Others	14,249	1.35		0	±0
Blank ballots	11,128	1.05	+0.06		
Valid votes	1,058,874	99.28	+0.04		
Invalid votes	7,697	0.72	−0.04		
Votes cast / turnout	1,066,571	78.83	+6.33		
Registered voters	1,352,958				

==== Extremadura ====
Parties and alliances	Votes	%	±pp	Seats	+/−
PSOE	289,149	43.94	−10.22	31	−8
PP	259,703	39.46	+12.68	27	+8
IU–LV–CE	69,387	10.54	+2.39	6	+2
CEx	25,168	3.82	−0.17	1	+1
SIEx	7,722	1.17	New	0	±0
PCPE	1,136	0.17	−0.24	0	±0
CDS	n/a	n/a	−5.73	0	−3
Blank ballots	5,804	0.88	+0.10		
Valid votes	658,069	99.34	±0.00		
Invalid votes	4,375	0.66	±0.00		
Votes cast / turnout	662,444	78.33	+7.48		
Registered voters	845,728				

==== La Rioja ====
Parties and alliances	Votes	%	±pp	Seats	+/−
PP	81,703	49.44	+7.74	17	+2
PSOE	56,335	34.09	−8.28	12	−4
IU	11,921	7.21	+2.68	2	+2
PR	11,069	6.70	+1.32	2	±0
AR	1,368	0.83	New	0	±0
Blank ballots	2,856	1.73	+0.08		
Valid votes	165,252	99.30	+0.08		
Invalid votes	1,170	0.70	−0.08		
Votes cast / turnout	166,422	76.16	+7.27		
Registered voters	218,519				

==== Madrid ====
Parties and alliances	Votes	%	±pp	Seats	+/−
PP	1,476,442	50.98	+8.31	54	+7
PSOE	860,726	29.72	−6.87	32	−9
IU	464,167	16.03	+3.96	17	+4
Others	56,079	1.94		0	±0
Blank ballots	38,763	1.34	+0.05		
Valid votes	2,896,177	99.62	+0.03		
Invalid votes	10,964	0.38	−0.03		
Votes cast / turnout	2,907,141	70.39	+11.72		
Registered voters	4,129,852				

==== Murcia ====
Parties and alliances	Votes	%	±pp	Seats	+/−
PP	330,514	52.23	+18.72	26	+9
PSOE	201,659	31.87	−13.40	15	−9
IU–LV–RM	78,875	12.46	+1.14	4	±0
Others	14,750	2.33		0	±0
Blank ballots	7,033	1.11	+0.17		
Valid votes	632,831	99.14	+0.10		
Invalid votes	5,466	0.86	−0.10		
Votes cast / turnout	638,297	75.27	+8.09		
Registered voters	847,967				

==== Navarre ====
Parties and alliances	Votes	%	±pp	Seats	+/−
UPN	93,163	31.35	−3.60	17	−3
PSN–PSOE	62,021	20.87	−12.49	11	−8
CDN	55,153	18.56	New	10	+10
IU/EB	27,773	9.35	+5.28	5	+3
HB	27,404	9.22	−1.98	5	−1
EA	13,568	4.57	−0.95	2	−1
Batzarre	6,509	2.19	−0.19	0	±0
Others	5,827	1.96		0	±0
Blank ballots	5,761	1.94	+0.62		
Valid votes	297,179	99.21	−0.03		
Invalid votes	2,366	0.79	+0.03		
Votes cast / turnout	299,545	68.42	+1.71		
Registered voters	437,797				

==== Valencian Community ====
Parties and alliances	Votes	%	±pp	Seats	+/−
PP	1,013,859	42.83	+15.01	42	+11
PSOE	804,463	33.98	−8.87	32	−13
EU–EV	273,030	11.53	+2.24	10	+4
UV–FICVA–CCV	165,956	7.01	−3.35	5	−2
UPV–BN	64,253	2.71	−0.97	0	±0
Others	20,975	0.89		0	±0
Blank ballots	24,864	1.05	+0.02		
Valid votes	2,367,400	99.44	±0.00		
Invalid votes	13,214	0.56	±0.00		
Votes cast / turnout	2,380,614	76.03	+6.79		
Registered voters	3,131,191				

=== November (Catalonia) ===
Parties and alliances	Votes	%	±pp	Seats	+/−
CiU	1,320,071	40.95	−5.24	60	−10
PSC–PSOE	802,252	24.89	−2.66	34	−6
PP	421,752	13.08	+7.11	17	+10
IC–EV	313,092	9.71	+1.98	11	+4
ERC	305,867	9.49	+1.53	13	+2
Others	29,501	0.92		0	±0
Blank ballots	31,417	0.97	−0.21		
Valid votes	3,223,952	99.72	+0.14		
Invalid votes	9,007	0.28	−0.14		
Votes cast / turnout	3,232,959	63.64	+8.77		
Registered voters	5,079,981				

== Bibliography ==
- Ley Orgánica 5/1985, de 19 de junio, del Régimen Electoral General (Organic Law 5/1985). Official State Gazette (in Spanish). 19 June 1985 [version as of 24 March 1995]. BOE-A-1985-11672.
