= Ceutan Democratic Union =

Ceutan Democratic Union Unión Demócrata Ceutí
- General secretary: Mohamed Mohamed Alí
- Registered: 4 September 2002
- Headquarters: C/ Nicaragua S/n (Pisos de Galo), Ceuta
- Youth wing: Jóvenes Demócratas (JJDD)
- Ideology: Democratic socialism Multiculturalism; Regionalism
- Political position: Left-wing
- National affiliation: Caballas Coalition

Website
- www.ceuta.com/comunicados/udce

The Ceutan Democratic Union (Spanish: Unión Demócrata Ceutí, abbreviated to UDCE) is a left-wing political party in Ceuta, a Spanish exclave on the North African coast, bordering Morocco. It was registered on 4 September 2002. It originated from a group of Muslims studying in Granada at the turn of the millennium, who had tried contributing, to no avail, to the Democratic and Social Party of Ceuta (a party composed of Muslims). Consequently, they founded a new party for the 2003 election, choosing the young lawyer Mohamed Alí as their leader; the party's candidates were educated young professionals.

The UDCE won three seats in the 2003 Ceuta Assembly election, second only to the People's Party (19 seats). Mohamed Alí became the leader of the opposition and the first Muslim in this role. The UDCE's emergence caused the Democratic and Social Party of Ceuta to lose half its votes. The UDCE took part in the 2007 election in an alliance with United Left, winning four seats and remaining in second place.

For the 2011 election, the UDCE ran with the Socialist Party of the People of Ceuta as the Caballas Coalition, winning four seats again. Mohamed Alí continued leading the coalition for subsequent elections until his retirement from politics in 2021; Caballas Coalition has since become Ceuta Ya!.

The UDCE's youth wing is Jóvenes Demócratas (JJDD, Young Democrats).

== Electoral results ==
=== Ceuta Assembly ===
Ceuta Assembly
Election	Votes	%	Seats	+/–	Leading candidate	Government
2003	3,589	10.74 (#2)	3 / 25	New	Mohamed Alí	Opposition
2007	5,659	16.41 (#2)	4 / 25	▲1	Mohamed Alí	Opposition
