= Democratic and Social Party of Ceuta =

Political party in Spain

Democratic and Social Party of Ceuta Partido Democrático y Social de Ceuta
- Leader: Tarek Mizzian
- Founder: Mustafa Mizzian
- Founded: 1994
- Headquarters: Ceuta
- Ideology: Localism

The Democratic and Social Party of Ceuta (Spanish: Partido Democrático y Social de Ceuta, PDSC) is a regional political party in Ceuta, Spain, founded in 1994. The PDSC, which is primarily composed of Ceuta's Muslim community, first gained a seat in the Assembly of Ceuta in the 1995 election. Their representative, local businessman Mustafa Mizzian Amar, became the first Muslim in this position. For the next few years, the PDSC supported the center-right People's Party (PP) administration of the city. The PDSC helped bring about various programs that benefited the Muslim community.

They later obtained two more seats in the 1999 election, in which the Liberal Independent Group (GIL) won 12 out of 25 seats. The PDSC formed a government with the PP (eight seats) and the Spanish Socialist Workers' Party (PSOE, two seats), in which Mustafa Mizzian served as Ceuta's Minister of Public Works. However, this government fell a month later as a result of the defection of Susana Bermúdez from the PSOE, bringing the GIL to power. The PP returned to power in 2001 and Mizzian resumed his position, while the PDSC's secretary-general Mohamed Chaib was now Minister of Social Welfare. However, the two resigned shortly after, as they were indicted for (and later found guilty of) instigating riots in 1999. In 2003, the appearance of the (also Muslim-focused) Ceutan Democratic Union caused the PDSC to lose two seats in the 2003 election, leaving them with only one (Mizzian) which they later lost in the 2007 election.

Mustafa Mizzian was appointed advisor to Juan Jesús Vivas's Ceuta administration shortly before his death on 8 February 2010 at the age of 58. The party was reactivated later that year after two years of inactivity, now with Abderrafer Mohamed as its president, Sanah Ali as vice president and Tarek Mohamed Mizzian (Mustafa's nephew) as secretary-general. Tarek Mizzian was the president of the party by 2019.

For the 2019 election, the PDSC, by this point dissatisfied with the PP administration of Juan Jesús Vivas, made an electoral agreement with the Ceuta branch of United Left (IU). However, IU then allied with Podemos on the national level, and the latter refused to accept the Ceuta IU's existing agreement with the PDSC. Mohamed Haddu Musa, the coordinator of the United Left in Ceuta, left the party because of this, instead running as Coalición por Ceuta with the PDSC. They won no seats and did not take part in the following election in 2023. Mustafa Mizzian was posthumously awarded the Medal of Autonomy of Ceuta in September 2026.

== Electoral results ==
=== Ceuta Assembly ===
Ceuta Assembly
Election	Votes	%	Seats	+/–	Leading candidate	Government
1995	1,449	5.04 (#6)	1 / 25	New	Mustafa Mizzian	Support
1999	3,340	10.02 (#3)	3 / 25	▲2	Mustafa Mizzian	Government (1999)
1999	3,340	10.02 (#3)	3 / 25	▲2	Mustafa Mizzian	Opposition
1999	3,340	10.02 (#3)	3 / 25	▲2	Mustafa Mizzian	Government (2001–2003)
2003	1,722	5.15 (#4)	1 / 25	▼2	Mustafa Mizzian	Opposition
2007	1,258	3.65 (#5)	0 / 25	▼1	Mustafa Mizzian	No seats
2011	720	2.34 (#5)	0 / 25	0	Abderrafer Mohamed Abdelnebi	No seats
2015	531	1.82 (#6)	0 / 25	0	Tarek Mizzian	No seats
2019	329	0.97 (#8)	0 / 25	0	Tarek Mizzian	No seats
