= Progress and Future of Ceuta =

Progress and Future of Ceuta Progreso y Futuro de Ceuta
- Founded: 1991
- Dissolved: 1999
- Split from: Spanish Socialist Workers' Party
- Ideology: Localism
- Political position: Centre-left

Progress and Future of Ceuta (Spanish: Progreso y Futuro de Ceuta, PFC) was a political party established as a grouping of electors ahead of the 1991 Spanish local elections in the city of Ceuta by the then-city's mayor Francisco Fráiz Armada, and was composed by independents and Spanish Socialist Workers' Party (PSOE) disenchanted members. The party accessed government for a first term in 1991 with the support of the United Ceuta (CEU) party, then in 1995 under Basilio Fernández López—to become the first Mayor-President of Ceuta—with the support of both CEU and PSOE. The party would lose all of its parliamentary representation in the 1999 Ceuta Assembly election and would disband shortly thereafter.

== Electoral performance ==
Assembly of Ceuta
Election	Leader	#	%	Score	Seats	+/–
City council
1991	Francisco Fráiz Armada	9,420	37.3	1st	11 / 25	11
Autonomous city
1995	Basilio Fernández López	5,778	20.1	2nd	6 / 25	5
1999	Juan Antonio García Ponferrada	625	1.9	8th	0 / 25	6
