= Socialist Party of the People of Ceuta =

Socialist Party of the People of Ceuta Partido Socialista del Pueblo de Ceuta
- General secretary: José Antonio Sáiz Castañeda
- Registered: 31 January 1986
- Headquarters: C/ Echegaray 1, local 1-D (Ceuta)
- Youth wing: Alternativa 21
- Ideology: Socialism
- Political position: Left-wing
- National affiliation: Caballas Coalition

Website
- pspc.es

The Socialist Party of the People of Ceuta (Spanish: Partido Socialista del Pueblo de Ceuta, abbreviated to PSPC) is a political party in Ceuta, an autonomous city of Spain in north Africa. The PSPC was registered on 31 January 1986; amongst its members were defectors from the Spanish Socialist Workers' Party (PSOE) and the Communist Party, as well as some independents.

Aurelio Puya, a founder of the party, became mayor of Ceuta after the previous mayor Francisco Fráiz Armada was voted out by the council on 21 June 1985. Puya was a councillor who had recently defected from the PSOE. Puya served as mayor until the 1987 elections, when his party won 3 seats and formed a governing majority with the PSOE (8 seats) and CDS (2 seats). The PSPC won only two seats in the 1991 and 1995 elections, losing both in the 1999 election. For the 2011 election, the PSPC ran together with the Ceutan Democratic Union (UDCE) as the Caballas Coalition, winning four seats. By this point the PSPC was led by Juan Luis Aróstegui, who had been its lead candidate for the 1991 and 1995 elections.

Alejandro Curiel Cabezudo, another founder and councillor of the party, served as its general secretary from 1985 to 1992, thereafter becoming the general secretary of the Unión General de Trabajadores (General Union of Workers) in Ceuta. He became the honorary president of the party in the mid-90s, holding this position until his death in 2017.

A major demand of the PSPC is that Ceuta be made into an autonomous community, like other regions of Spain.

The youth wing of the PSPC is called Alternativa 21.
