= 2027 Melilla Assembly election =

Election in the Spanish autonomous city of Melilla

- 23 May 2027

All 25 seats in the Assembly of Melilla 13 seats needed for a majority
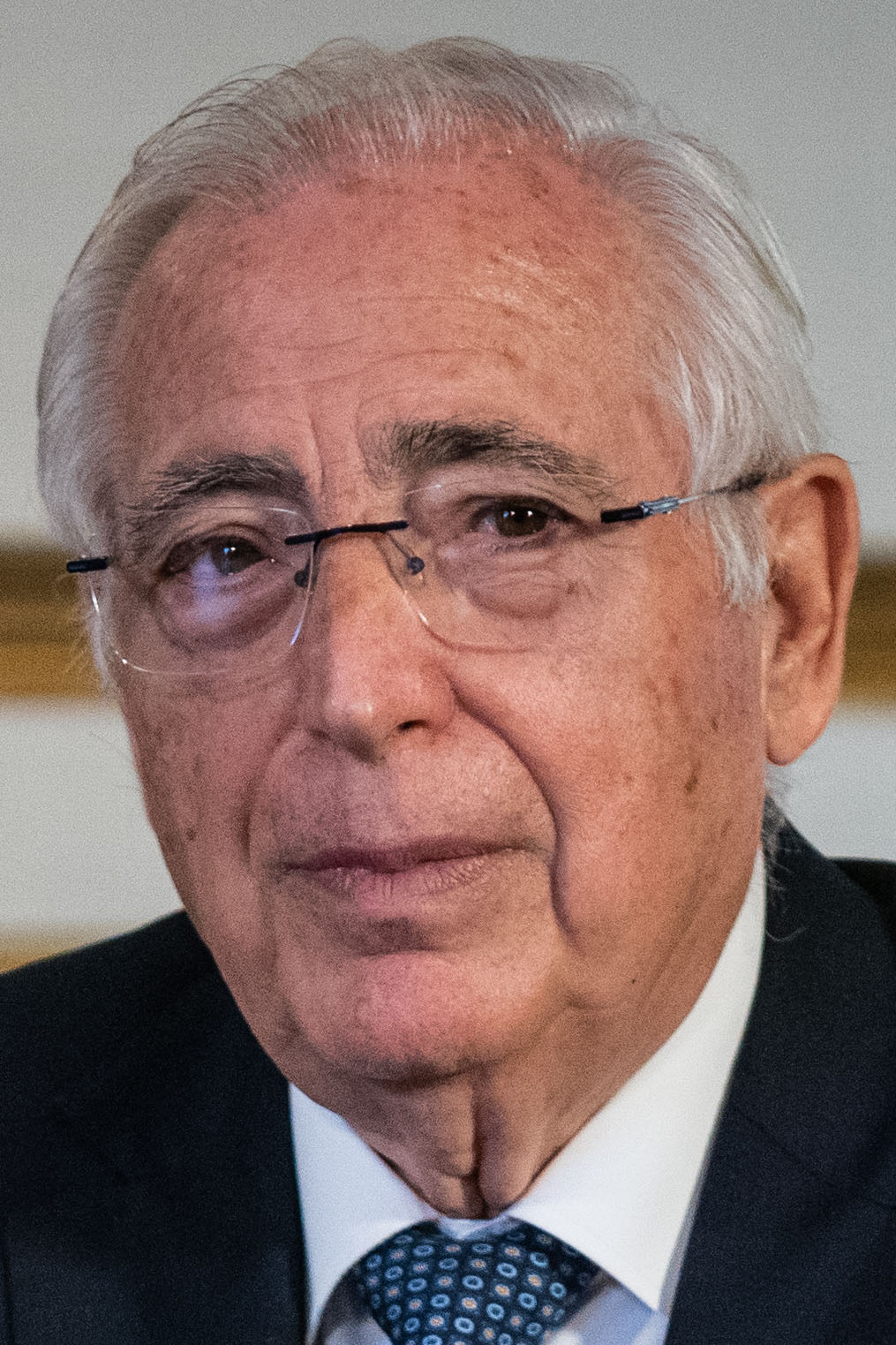

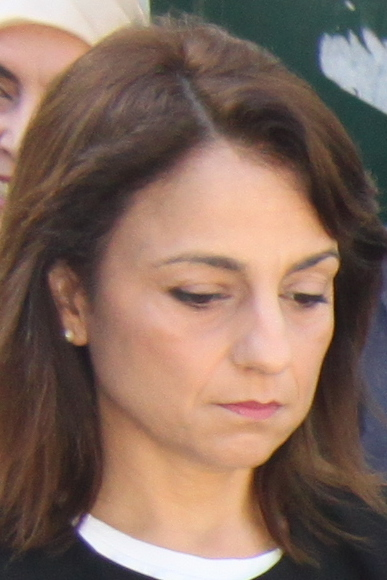

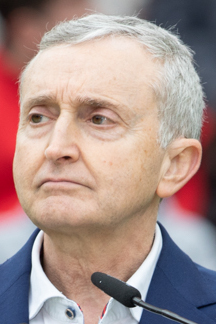

Leader	Juan José Imbroda	Dunia Almansouri	Gloria Rojas
Party	PP	CpM	PSOE
Leader since	20 July 2000	20 April 2023	24 November 2014
Last election	14 seats, 52.6%	5 seats, 18.8%	3 seats, 10.8%
Current seats	14	5	3
Seats needed	In majority	8	10
Leader	José Miguel Tasende	Amin Azmani
Party	Vox	SML
Leader since	28 December 2022	5 April 2023
Last election	2 seats, 9.9%	1 seat, 5.1%
Current seats	2	1
Seats needed	11	12
Incumbent Mayor-President
Juan José Imbroda
PP

The 2027 Melilla Assembly election will be held on Sunday, 23 May 2027, to elect the 9th Assembly of the autonomous city of Melilla. All 25 seats in the Assembly will be up for election. The election will be held simultaneously with regional elections in at least eight autonomous communities and local elections all throughout Spain.

== Electoral system ==
The Assembly of Melilla is the top-tier administrative and governing body of the autonomous city of Melilla. Voting for the Assembly is on the basis of universal suffrage, which comprises all nationals over eighteen, registered and residing in the municipality of Melilla and in full enjoyment of their political rights, as well as resident non-national European citizens and those whose country of origin allow Spanish nationals to vote in their own elections by virtue of a treaty.

The 25 members of the Assembly of Melilla are elected using the D'Hondt method and a closed list proportional representation, with a threshold of five percent of valid votes—which includes blank ballots—being applied.

The Mayor-President is indirectly elected by the plenary assembly. A legal clause requires that mayoral candidates earns the vote of an absolute majority of councillors, or else the candidate of the most-voted party in the assembly shall be automatically appointed to the post. In the event of a tie, the appointee will be determined by lot.

== Parties and candidates ==
The electoral law allows for parties and federations registered in the interior ministry, coalitions and groupings of electors to present lists of candidates. Parties and federations intending to form a coalition ahead of an election are required to inform the relevant Electoral Commission within ten days of the election call, whereas groupings of electors need to secure the signature of at least one percent of the electorate in the constituencies for which they seek election, disallowing electors from signing for more than one list of candidates.

== Opinion polls ==
The tables below list opinion polling results in reverse chronological order, showing the most recent first and using the dates when the survey fieldwork was done, as opposed to the date of publication. Where the fieldwork dates are unknown, the date of publication is given instead. The highest percentage figure in each polling survey is displayed with its background shaded in the leading party's colour. If a tie ensues, this is applied to the figures with the highest percentages. The "Lead" column on the right shows the percentage-point difference between the parties with the highest percentages in a poll.

=== Voting intention estimates ===
The table below lists weighted voting intention estimates. Refusals are generally excluded from the party vote percentages, while question wording and the treatment of "don't know" responses and those not intending to vote may vary between polling organisations. When available, seat projections determined by the polling organisations are displayed below (or in place of) the percentages in a smaller font; 13 seats are required for an absolute majority in the Assembly of Melilla.

Polling firm/Commissioner	Fieldwork date	Sample size	Turnout	PP	CpM	PSOE	Vox	SML	Podemos	Sumar	SALF	Lead
GAD3/PP	27–29 Apr 2026	500	?	51.7; 14	11.4; 3	13.4; 3/4	11.3; 2/3	9.3; 2	–	–	–	38.3
SyM Consulting	8–11 Oct 2025	691	54.0	30.8; 8/9	27.6; 7/8	12.0; 3	20.3; 5	6.4; 1	–	–	–	3.2
SyM Consulting	23–26 Apr 2025	691	55.1	34.6; 9/10	25.2; 7	12.7; 3/4	19.6; 5	4.8; 0	–	–	–	9.4
SyM Consulting	31 Jan–2 Feb 2025	587	55.6	36.7; 9/10	20.2; 5/6	12.6; 3	22.5; 6	5.3; 1	–	–	–	14.2
SyM Consulting	13–16 Sep 2024	613	62.2	36.3; 10	28.2; 7/8	14.4; 4	14.1; 3/4	4.0; 0	–	–	–	8.1
2024 EP election	9 Jun 2024	—N/a	30.1	40.0 (11)	–	33.7 (9)	14.1 (4)	–	1.6 (0)	1.7 (0)	5.9 (1)	6.3
SyM Consulting	8–11 May 2024	528	58.5	43.4; 12/13	26.2; 7	12.7; 3	9.9; 2/3	3.7; 0	–	–	–	17.2
2023 general election	23 Jul 2023	—N/a	45.2	49.2 (14)	4.7 (0)	25.4 (7)	15.9 (4)	–	(Note: Within Sumar.)	3.0 (0)	–	23.8
2023 Assembly election	28 May 2023	—N/a	49.2	52.7; 14	18.8; 5	10.7; 3	9.9; 2	5.1; 1	1.0; 0	–	–	33.9
