= List of political parties in Melilla =

This article lists political parties in Melilla.

== The parties ==
Most of the Spanish political parties are active in Melilla. In addition are the following regional parties:

- Coalition for Melilla (Coalición por Melilla)
- Party of Labour and Progress of Melilla (Partido del Trabajo y el Progreso de Melilla)
- People's Party of Melilla
- Podemos Melilla
- Socialist Party of Melilla
- Somos Melilla
- Vox Melilla

=== Former parties ===
- Andalusian Regional Union
- Localist Bloc of Melilla
- Melillan People's Union
- Nationalist Party of the Rif of Melilla
- Populars in Freedom Party

== See also ==
- List of political parties in Ceuta
- List of political parties in Spain
