= 2023 Spanish vote-buying scandal =

Election rigging scandal in Spain

Throughout the month of May 2023, during the campaign for the local elections in Spain, multiple cases of vote buying were uncovered in several municipalities in Spain. These cases involved a broad spectrum of political parties, among which the two major political parties the Spanish Socialist Workers' Party (PSOE) and the People's Party (PP) stood out.

The scandal broke out when an increase of the postal voting for the Melilla Assembly election was detected and many mail carriers were assaulted while carrying the postal voting. Following these events, some parties, such as Coalition for Melilla (CpM), The Greens–Green Group (LV–GV) and Vox asked the Central Electoral Commission (JEC) to suspend the election and to cancel postal votes. On 23 May, ten individuals were arrested for their involvement in an attempted large-scale vote-buying fraud. Among those arrested were the son-in-law of Mustafa Aberchán, the leader of CpM; and Mohamed Ahmed Al-lal, who holds the third position on CpM's list and serves as a regional minister in the government of Melilla. The latter was dismissed by the Mayor-President of Melilla Eduardo de Castro the following day. Moreover, two individuals linked to the PP were also among the arrested.

In the following days, a number of cases in other municipalities of the country broke out involving the whole political spectrum. This led to the PP member Esteban González Pons accusing PSOE of a "widespread vote-buying scheme", although most of the towns implicated in the scandal involved either the PP or its candidates.

== List of municipalities involved ==
Location of municipalities in which vote buying is being investigated
Location of municipalities in which vote buying is being investigated (Canary Islands)

Municipality	Population	Involved parties	Ref.
Albudeite	1,390	Spanish Socialist Workers' Party (PSOE)	
Arona	82,982	Spanish Socialist Workers' Party (PSOE)	
Bigastro	7,130	People's Party (PP)	
Carboneras	8,210	People's Party (PP)	
Casares de las Hurdes	374	People's Party (PP)	
Córdoba	325,708	People's Party (PP)	
Finestrat	7,909	People's Party (PP)	
Jaén	113,457	People's Party (PP)	
La Gomera	21,798	Gomera Socialist Group (ASG)	
Mazarrón	33,700	People's Party (PP)	
Melilla	85,170	Coalition for Melilla (CpM)	
Melilla	85,170	People's Party (PP)	
Mojácar	7,527	Spanish Socialist Workers' Party (PSOE)	
Moraleja de Sayago	290	Zamora Yes (ZSí)	
Paterna del Campo	3,478	People's Party (PP)	
Valverde del Camino	12,721	People's Party (PP)	
Villalba del Alcor	3,316	People's Party (PP)	

== See also ==
- 2023 Spanish local elections
- 2023 Melilla Assembly election
