= 2011 Melilla Assembly election =

Election in the Spanish autonomous city of Melilla

- 22 May 2011

All 25 seats in the Assembly of Melilla 13 seats needed for a majority
- Opinion polls
- Registered: 54,282 8.1%
- Turnout: 31,589 (58.2%); 0.6 pp
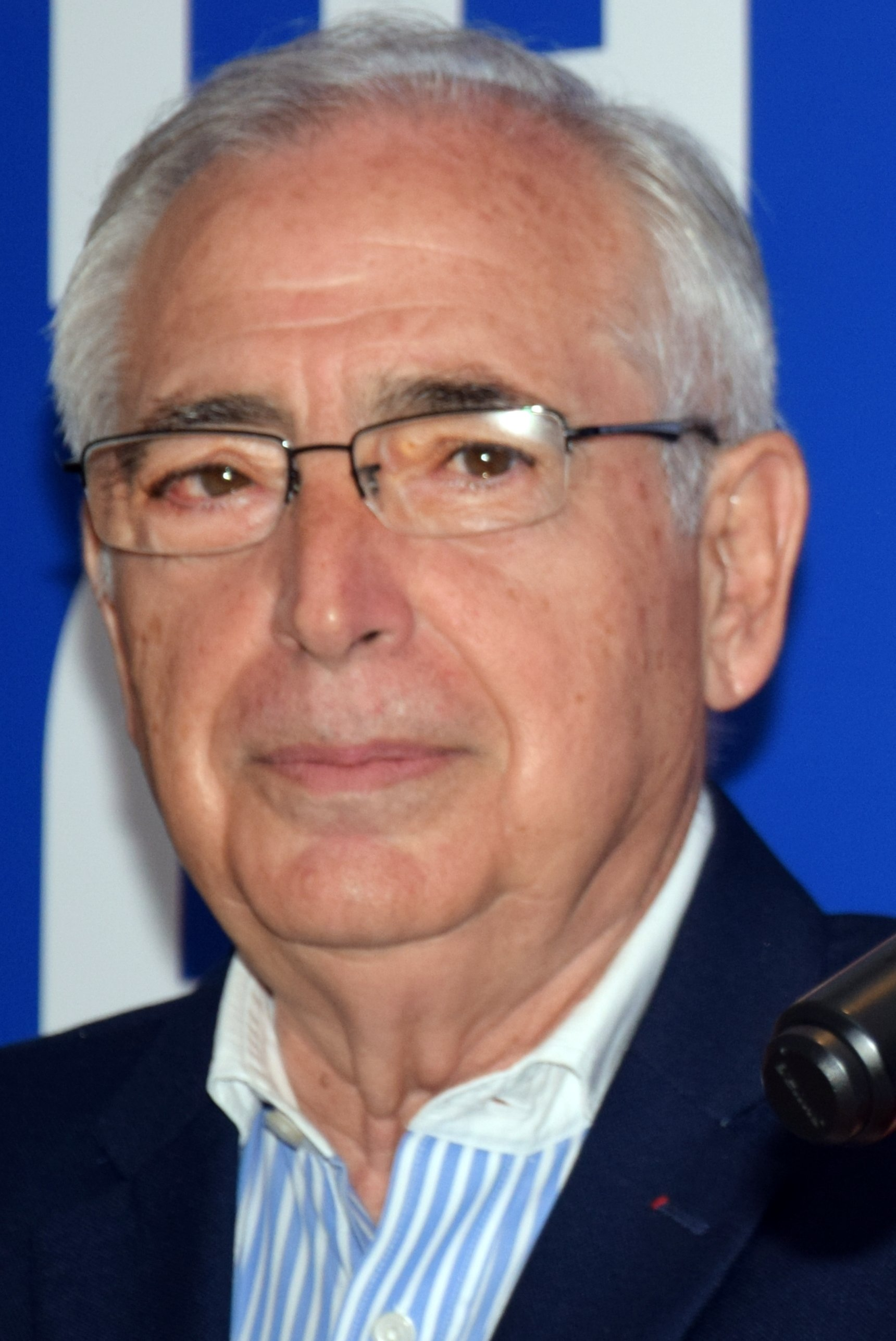

	First party	Second party	Third party
Leader	Juan José Imbroda	Mustafa Aberchán	Dionisio Muñoz
Party	PP	CpM	PSOE
Leader since	20 July 2000	2 October 1995	October 2004
Last election	15 seats, 56.0%	5 seats, 21.7%	5 seats, 18.2%
Seats won	15	6	2
Seat change	0	1	3
Popular vote	16,852	7,394	2,683
Percentage	53.9%	23.7%	8.6%
Swing	2.1 pp	2.0 pp	9.6 pp
	Fourth party
Leader	Ignacio Velázquez Rivera
Party	PPL
Leader since	26 March 2011
Last election	Did not contest
Seats won	2
Seat change	2
Popular vote	2,128
Percentage	6.8%
Swing	New party
Mayor-President before election
Juan José Imbroda
PP
Elected Mayor-President
Juan José Imbroda
PP

The 2011 Melilla Assembly election was held on Sunday, 22 May 2011, to elect the 5th Assembly of the Autonomous City of Melilla. All 25 seats in the Assembly were up for election. The election was held simultaneously with regional elections in thirteen autonomous communities and local elections all throughout Spain.

== Electoral system ==
The Assembly of Melilla was the top-tier administrative and governing body of the autonomous city of Melilla. Voting for the Assembly was on the basis of universal suffrage, which comprised all nationals over eighteen, registered and residing in the municipality of Melilla and in full enjoyment of their political rights, as well as resident non-national European citizens and those whose country of origin allowed Spanish nationals to vote in their own elections by virtue of a treaty.

The 25 members of the Assembly of Melilla were elected using the D'Hondt method and a closed list proportional representation, with a threshold of 5 percent of valid votes—which included blank ballots—being applied. Parties not reaching the threshold were not taken into consideration for seat distribution.

The Mayor-President was indirectly elected by the plenary assembly. A legal clause required that mayoral candidates earned the vote of an absolute majority of members, or else the candidate of the most-voted party in the assembly was to be automatically appointed to the post. In case of a tie, a toss-up would determine the appointee.

== Parties and candidates ==
The electoral law allowed for parties and federations registered in the interior ministry, coalitions and groupings of electors to present lists of candidates. Parties and federations intending to form a coalition ahead of an election were required to inform the relevant Electoral Commission within ten days of the election call, whereas groupings of electors needed to secure the signature of at least one percent of the electorate in the constituencies for which they sought election, disallowing electors from signing for more than one list of candidates.

== Opinion polls ==
The table below lists voting intention estimates in reverse chronological order, showing the most recent first and using the dates when the survey fieldwork was done, as opposed to the date of publication. Where the fieldwork dates are unknown, the date of publication is given instead. The highest percentage figure in each polling survey is displayed with its background shaded in the leading party's colour. If a tie ensues, this is applied to the figures with the highest percentages. The "Lead" column on the right shows the percentage-point difference between the parties with the highest percentages in a poll. When available, seat projections determined by the polling organisations are displayed below (or in place of) the percentages in a smaller font; 13 seats were required for an absolute majority in the Assembly of Melilla.

Polling firm/Commissioner	Fieldwork date	Sample size	Turnout	PP	CpM	PSOE	UPyD	PPL	Lead
2011 Assembly election	22 May 2011	—N/a	58.2	53.9; 15	23.7; 6	8.6; 2	2.1; 0	6.8; 2	30.2
Infortécnica	25 Apr–6 May 2011	406	?	76.8; 16/19	13.0; 3/5	10.3; 3/4	–	–	63.8
Sigma Dos/El Mundo	11–14 Apr 2011	300	?	67.2; 18/19	11.6; 3	14.9; 3/4	–	–	52.3
CIS	13 Apr 2011	300	?	56.8; 16	12.6; 3	18.2; 5	5.1; 1	–	38.6
Sigma Dos/El Mundo	28–29 Dec 2010	300	?	70.7; 19/20	7.2; 1/2	16.7; 4	–	–	54.0
Sigma Dos/El Mundo	26–27 May 2010	300	?	64.7; 18/19	8.9; 2	19.5; 4/5	–	–	45.2
2009 EP election	7 Jun 2009	—N/a	33.0	56.1 (15)	–	37.5 (10)	3.3 (0)	–	18.6
2008 general election	9 Mar 2008	—N/a	63.7	49.0 (13)	–	48.1 (12)	1.1 (0)	–	0.9
2007 Assembly election	27 May 2007	—N/a	57.6	56.0; 15	21.7; 5	18.2; 5	–	–	34.3

== Results ==
← Summary of the 22 May 2011 Assembly of Melilla election results →
Parties and alliances	Popular vote			Seats	
Parties and alliances	Votes	%	±pp	Total	+/−
People's Party (PP)	16,852	53.91	–2.05	15	±0
Coalition for Melilla (CpM)	7,394	23.66	+1.95	6	+1
Spanish Socialist Workers' Party (PSOE)	2,683	8.58	–9.65	2	–3
Populars in Freedom Party (PPL)	2,128	6.81	New	2	+2
Union, Progress and Democracy (UPyD)	669	2.14	New	0	±0
Party of Democrats of Melilla (PDM)	529	1.69	New	0	±0
Green Melilla Platform (PMV)	504	1.61	New	0	±0
Spanish Alternative (AES)	59	0.19	New	0	±0
The Phalanx (FE)	57	0.18	New	0	±0
Blank ballots	382	1.22	–0.16		
Total	31,257			25	±0
Valid votes	31,257	98.95	–0.49		
Invalid votes	332	1.05	+0.49		
Votes cast / turnout	31,589	58.19	+0.54		
Abstentions	22,693	41.81	–0.54		
Registered voters	54,282				

Popular vote
PP	53.91%
CpM	23.66%
PSOE	8.58%
PPL	6.81%
UPyD	2.14%
PDM	1.69%
PMV	1.61%
Others	0.37%
Blank ballots	1.22%

Seats
PP	60.00%
CpM	24.00%
PSOE	8.00%
PPL	8.00%
