= Gloria Rojas (politician) =

Spanish politician

Gloria Rojas Ruiz (born 1967 or 1968) is a Spanish Socialist Workers' Party (PSOE) politician. She has served as her party's leader in the Assembly of Melilla since 2015 and as its secretary-general in Melilla since 2017.

== Biography ==
Born in Melilla, Rojas graduated in education sciences from the University of Granada, becoming a professor at its Melilla campus. She became vice dean of the campus.

The secretary general of the Melilla branch of the Spanish Socialist Workers' Party (PSOE), Dionisio Muñoz, chose Rojas as candidate for the Congress of Deputies in the single-seat Melilla constituency for the 2011 Spanish general election. In May 2015, she led the party from two to three seats in the Melilla Assembly election. In September 2017, she was elected secretary general of the party in the city.

In the 2019 Melilla Assembly election, Rojas led the PSOE to third place with four seats. The four PSOE members and the eight from the Coalition for Melilla (CpM) joined with the one deputy elected for Citizens (Cs), Eduardo de Castro, installing him as Mayor-President of Melilla to prevent a government of ten People's Party (PP) deputies and two from Vox. Rojas was named vice president, and in October, tabled a motion to remove the Statue of Francisco Franco, the last remaining in public in Spain. The motion was approved and the statue was removed in February 2021.

In the 2023 Melilla Assembly election, Rojas's PSOE fell to three seats, amidst larger losses for the party around the country. The PP regained a majority in the Assembly of Melilla, under Juan José Imbroda.
