= List of Spanish regional legislatures =

Since its transition to democracy in the late 1970s, Spain has been organized in a quasi-federal system called the "State of Autonomies". Each Autonomous Community is required by the Constitution to have its own three-branched system of government with its basic rules codified in a special law called a Statute of Autonomy, a sort-of regional constitution. Although there is no Constitutional requirement imposed upon regional elections other than that they must be based in proportional methods, all regional legislatures are unicameral, their members being elected in multi-member constituencies matching the provinces in the Autonomous Community with seats allocated to party lists using the D'Hondt method.

== Autonomous Cities ==
The cities of Ceuta and Melilla are explicitly empowered by the Constitution to form Autonomous Communities on their own. Such provision was exercised by the respective City Councils in 1995, but not to its full extent: instead, the cities decided to adopt a regime between a normal city and a full-fledged Autonomous Community, with the main differences being:

- The Assemblies of Ceuta and Melilla assume all the powers of the old City Councils, with the new Mayor-President assuming the role of the old Mayor. In particular, meetings of the Assemblies are presided over by the President of the City instead of having a separate Speaker of the Parliament like most legislatures.
- Their legislatures are not allowed to pass primary legislation except on matters specifically allowed by the Spanish Cortes. Nevertheless, they are allowed to pass secondary legislation regarding matters far beyond the normal competences of cities in Spain.
- In compensation for not being able to pass their own primary legislation, Ceuta and Melilla can formally introduce legislation in the Spanish Cortes, a privilege not held by other cities, not even the capital Madrid.
- Elections to the cities' legislatures are fixed not to a certain date (like those of most Autonomous Communities), but to the date of the Spanish local elections. The writs are issued through a Royal Decree of the Spanish Government, while in all other Autonomous Communities (even in those with fixed election dates) it is the regional President who issues a decree dissolving the legislature and mandating elections to be held at the usually pre-fixed date.

City	Legislature name Local name	Members	Mayor-President Party	Last election Fixed
Ceuta	Assembly of Ceuta; Sp. Asamblea de Ceuta	25	Juan Jesús Vivas Lara; People's Party	28 May 2023; By Spanish law
Melilla	Assembly of Melilla; Sp. Asamblea de Melilla	25	Juan José Imbroda Ortiz; People's Party	28 May 2023; By Spanish law

== Autonomous Communities ==
Except for Andalusia, the Basque Country, Catalonia and Galicia, which were created by a special fast procedure, most communities have very similar Statutes of Autonomy and election laws. Elections in those communities are fixed to a certain common date, which is currently "the fourth Sunday of May each four years", so regional Presidents cannot trigger a snap election nor select the final election date from a range of close dates. However, there have been occasions when the Speaker of the Legislative Assembly has been forced to call an out-of-sync election because the legislature was deadlocked in the President election. In those cases, the next election still takes place at the fixed common date, causing the new term out of the fresh elections to be shorter than normal: see President of Madrid#The 6th term scandal.

On the other hand, Presidents of communities created by the "fast procedure" can select the actual election date and trigger snap elections, and have frequently done so, particularly in the Basque Country and Catalonia. The Andalusian elections are usually set to coincide with the Spanish general elections, but again, there is no requisite to that effect in the Andalusian legislation.

Community	Legislature name Local names	Seat	Members	President	Last election Fixed
Andalusia	Andalusian Parliament; Sp. Parlamento de Andalucía	Seville	109	Ana Mestre; PP	17 May 2026; By President
Aragon	Aragonese Corts; Ara. Cortz d'Aragón; Sp. Cortes de Aragón	Zaragoza	67	María Navarro; PP	8 February 2026; By President
Asturias	General Junta of the Principality of Asturias; Ast. Xunta Xeneral del Principáu d'Asturies; Sp. Junta General del Principado de Asturias	Oviedo	45	Juan Cofiño; PSOE	28 May 2023; By law
Balearic Islands	Parliament of the Balearic Islands; Cat. Parlament de les Illes Balears; Sp. Parlamento de las Islas Baleares	Palma	59	Gabriel Le Senne; Vox	28 May 2023; By President
Basque Country	Basque Parliament; Ba. Eusko Legebiltzarra; Sp. Parlamento Vasco	Vitoria-Gasteiz	75	Bakartxo Tejeria; PNV	21 April 2024; By President
Canary Islands	Canarian Parliament; Sp. Parlamento de Canarias	Santa Cruz de Tenerife	70	Astrid Pérez; PP	28 May 2023; By President
Cantabria	Parliament of Cantabria; Sp. Parlamento de Cantabria	Santander	35	María José González Revuelta; PP	28 May 2023; By law
Castile–La Mancha	Cortes of Castile-La Mancha; Sp. Cortes de Castilla-La Mancha	Toledo	33	Pablo Bellido; PSOE	28 May 2023; By law
Castile and Leon	Cortes of Castile and León; Cast. Cortes de Castilla y León	Valladolid	81	Francisco Vázquez; PP	15 March 2026; By President
Catalonia	Parliament of Catalonia; Cat. Parlament de Catalunya; Oc. Parlament de Catalonha; Sp. Parlamento de Cataluña	Barcelona	135	Josep Rull; JxCat	12 May 2024; By President
Extremadura	Extremaduran Assembly; Sp. Asamblea de Extremadura	Mérida	65	Manuel Naharro; PP	21 December 2025; By President
Galicia	Parliament of Galicia; Gal. Parlamento de Galicia; Sp. Parlamento de Galicia	Santiago de Compostela	75	Miguel Ángel Santalices; PP	18 February 2024; By President
La Rioja	Parliament of La Rioja; Sp. Parlamento de La Rioja	Logroño	33	Marta Fernández Cornago; PP	28 May 2023; By law
Madrid	Madrid Assembly; Sp. Asamblea de Madrid	Madrid	135	Enrique Ossorio; PP	28 May 2023; By law
Region of Murcia	Regional Assembly of Murcia; Sp. Asamblea Regional de Murcia	Cartagena	45	María Visitación Martínez PP	28 May 2023; By law
Navarre	Parliament of Navarre; Ba. Nafarroako Parlamentua; Sp. Parlamento de Navarra	Pamplona-Iruña	50	Unai Hualde; GBai	28 May 2023; By President
Valencian Community	Valencian Corts; Val. Corts Valencianes; Sp. Cortes Valencianas	Valencia	99	María de los Llanos Massó; Vox	28 May 2023; By President
