= 2003 Melilla Assembly election =

Election in the Spanish autonomous city of Melilla

← 1999	25 May 2003	2007 →

All 25 seats in the Assembly of Melilla 13 seats needed for a majority
- Registered: 49,189 3.8%
- Turnout: 28,229 (57.4%); 3.0 pp
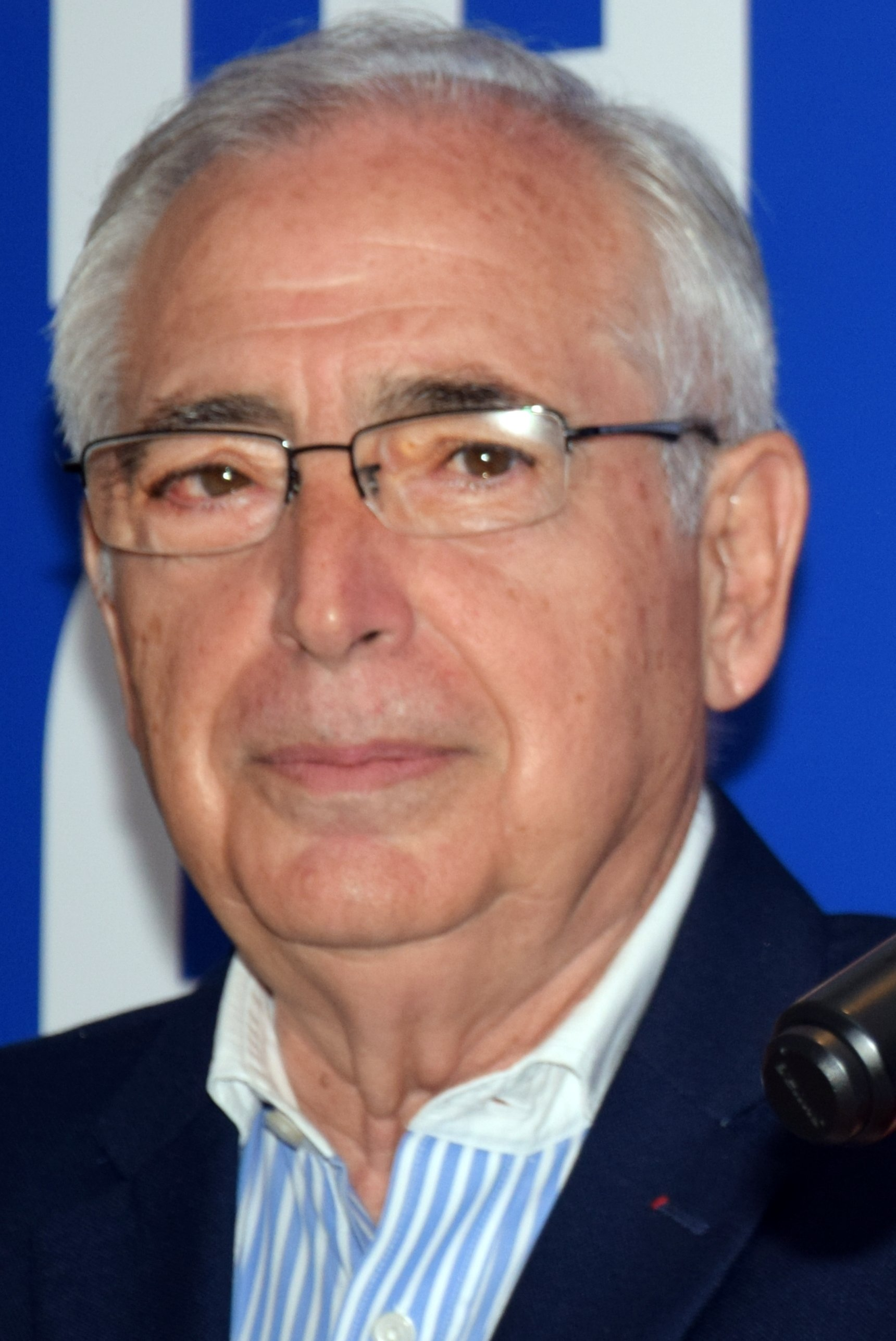

	First party	Second party	Third party
Leader	Juan José Imbroda	Mustafa Aberchán	Manuel Céspedes
Party	PP–UPM	CpM	PSOE
Leader since	20 July 2000	2 October 1995	2001
Last election	8 seats, 30.1% (Note: Aggregated data for PP and UPM in the 1999 election.)	5 seats, 20.4%	2 seats, 9.4%
Seats won	15	7	3
Seat change	7	2	1
Popular vote	15,440	7,392	3,365
Percentage	55.0%	26.3%	12.0%
Swing	24.9 pp	5.9 pp	2.6 pp
Mayor-President before election
Juan José Imbroda
PP
Elected Mayor-President
Juan José Imbroda
PP

The 2003 Melilla Assembly election was held on Sunday, 25 May 2003, to elect the 3rd Assembly of the Autonomous City of Melilla. All 25 seats in the Assembly were up for election. The election was held simultaneously with regional elections in thirteen autonomous communities and local elections all throughout Spain.

== Electoral system ==
The Assembly of Melilla was the top-tier administrative and governing body of the autonomous city of Melilla. Voting for the Assembly was on the basis of universal suffrage, which comprised all nationals over eighteen, registered and residing in the municipality of Melilla and in full enjoyment of their political rights, as well as resident non-national European citizens and those whose country of origin allowed Spanish nationals to vote in their own elections by virtue of a treaty.

The 25 members of the Assembly of Melilla were elected using the D'Hondt method and a closed list proportional representation, with a threshold of 5 percent of valid votes—which included blank ballots—being applied. Parties not reaching the threshold were not taken into consideration for seat distribution.

The Mayor-President was indirectly elected by the plenary assembly. A legal clause required that mayoral candidates earned the vote of an absolute majority of members, or else the candidate of the most-voted party in the assembly was to be automatically appointed to the post. In case of a tie, a toss-up would determine the appointee.

== Parties and candidates ==
The electoral law allowed for parties and federations registered in the interior ministry, coalitions and groupings of electors to present lists of candidates. Parties and federations intending to form a coalition ahead of an election were required to inform the relevant Electoral Commission within ten days of the election call, whereas groupings of electors needed to secure the signature of at least one percent of the electorate in the constituencies for which they sought election, disallowing electors from signing for more than one list of candidates.

== Results ==
← Summary of the 25 May 2003 Assembly of Melilla election results →
Parties and alliances	Popular vote			Seats	
Parties and alliances	Votes	%	±pp	Total	+/−
People's Party–Melillan People's Union (PP–UPM)^{1}	15,440	55.00	+24.89	15	+7
Coalition for Melilla (CpM)	7,392	26.33	+5.89	7	+2
Spanish Socialist Workers' Party (PSOE)	3,365	11.99	+2.62	3	+1
Independent Party of Melilla (PIM)	739	2.63	–7.67	0	–3
Democratic and Social Centre (CDS)	417	1.49	New	0	±0
The Greens–Green Group of Ceuta (LV–GV)	165	0.59	New	0	±0
Republican Left (IR)	139	0.50	New	0	±0
Nationalist Party of the Rif of Melilla (PNRIF)	101	0.36	New	0	±0
Liberal Independent Group (GIL)	n/a	n/a	–25.93	0	–7
Blank ballots	315	1.12	+0.08		
Total	28,073			25	±0
Valid votes	28,073	99.45	–0.22		
Invalid votes	156	0.55	+0.22		
Votes cast / turnout	28,229	57.39	–3.05		
Abstentions	20,960	42.61	+3.05		
Registered voters	49,189				
Sources
Footnotes: ^{1} People's Party–Melillan People's Union results are compared to the combined totals of People's Party and Melillan People's Union in the 1999 election.

Popular vote
PP–UPM	55.00%
CpM	26.33%
PSOE	11.99%
PIM	2.63%
CDS	1.49%
Others	1.44%
Blank ballots	1.12%

Seats
PP–UPM	60.00%
CpM	28.00%
PSOE	12.00%
