= 2007 Melilla Assembly election =

Election in the Spanish autonomous city of Melilla

| ← 2003 | 27 May 2007 | 2011 → |

All 25 seats in the Assembly of Melilla 13 seats needed for a majority
- Registered: 50,193 2.0%
- Turnout: 28,934 (57.6%); 0.2 pp
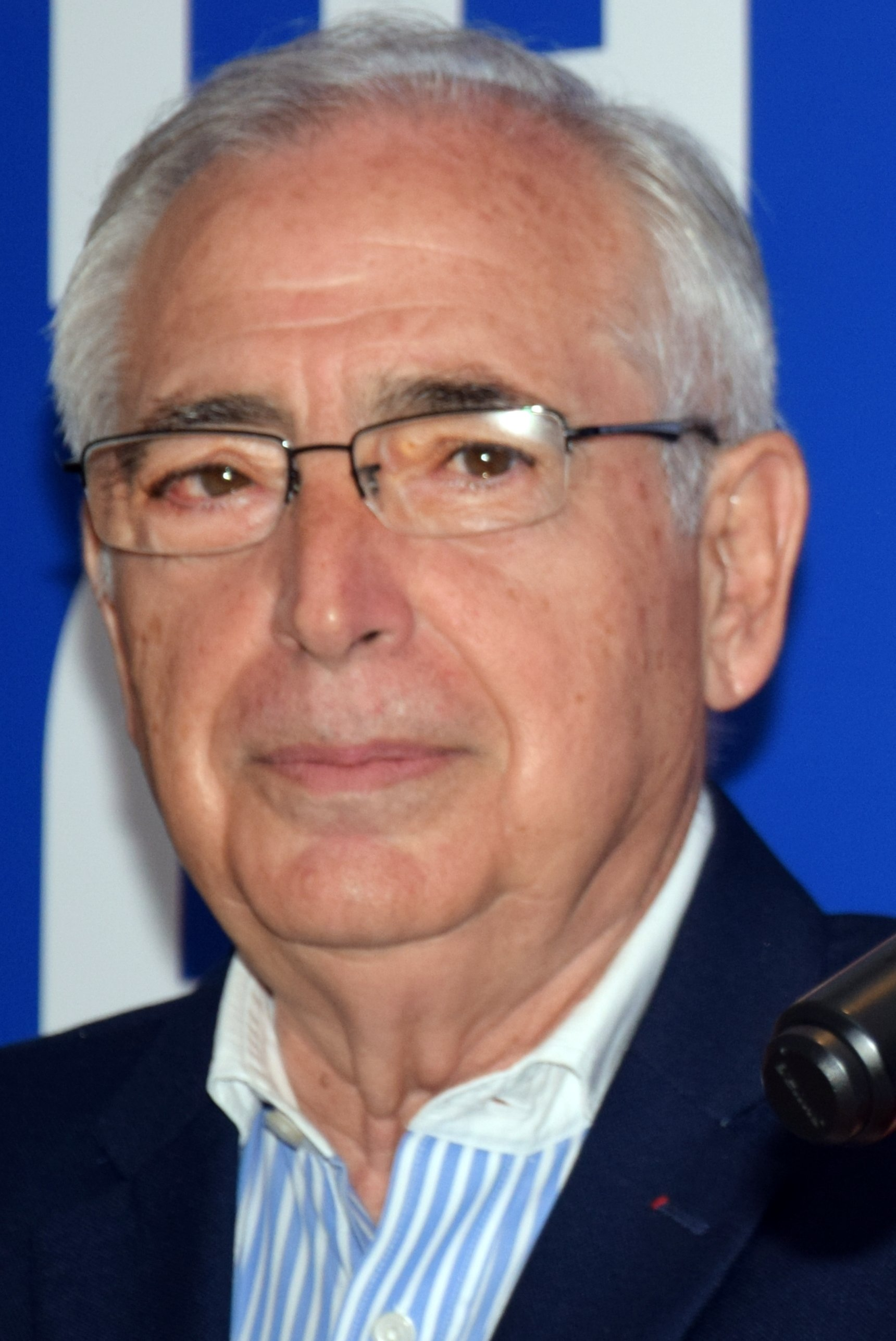

| | First party | Second party | Third party |
|---|---|---|---|
| Leader | Juan José Imbroda | Mustafa Aberchán | Dionisio Muñoz |
| Party | PP | CpM | PSOE |
| Leader since | 20 July 2000 | 2 October 1995 | October 2004 |
| Last election | 15 seats, 55.0% | 7 seats, 26.3% | 3 seats, 12.0% |
| Seats won | 15 | 5 | 5 |
| Seat change | 0 | 2 | 2 |
| Popular vote | 16,102 | 6,245 | 5,246 |
| Percentage | 56.0% | 21.7% | 18.2% |
| Swing | 1.0 pp | 4.6 pp | 6.2 pp |
Mayor-President before election
Juan José Imbroda
PP
Elected Mayor-President
Juan José Imbroda
PP

The 2007 Melilla Assembly election was held on Sunday, 27 May 2007, to elect the 4th Assembly of the Autonomous City of Melilla. All 25 seats in the Assembly were up for election. The election was held simultaneously with regional elections in thirteen autonomous communities and local elections all throughout Spain.

== Electoral system ==
The Assembly of Melilla was the top-tier administrative and governing body of the autonomous city of Melilla. Voting for the Assembly was on the basis of universal suffrage, which comprised all nationals over eighteen, registered and residing in the municipality of Melilla and in full enjoyment of their political rights, as well as resident non-national European citizens and those whose country of origin allowed Spanish nationals to vote in their own elections by virtue of a treaty.

The 25 members of the Assembly of Melilla were elected using the D'Hondt method and a closed list proportional representation, with a threshold of 5 percent of valid votes—which included blank ballots—being applied. Parties not reaching the threshold were not taken into consideration for seat distribution.

The Mayor-President was indirectly elected by the plenary assembly. A legal clause required that mayoral candidates earned the vote of an absolute majority of members, or else the candidate of the most-voted party in the assembly was to be automatically appointed to the post. In case of a tie, a toss-up would determine the appointee.

== Parties and candidates ==
The electoral law allowed for parties and federations registered in the interior ministry, coalitions and groupings of electors to present lists of candidates. Parties and federations intending to form a coalition ahead of an election were required to inform the relevant Electoral Commission within ten days of the election call, whereas groupings of electors needed to secure the signature of at least one percent of the electorate in the constituencies for which they sought election, disallowing electors from signing for more than one list of candidates.

== Results ==
← Summary of the 27 May 2007 Assembly of Melilla election results →
| Parties and alliances | Popular vote | | | Seats | |
| Parties and alliances | Votes | % | ±pp | Total | +/− |
|---|---|---|---|---|---|
| People's Party (PP) | 16,102 | 55.96 | +0.96 | 15 | ±0 |
| Coalition for Melilla (CpM) | 6,245 | 21.71 | –4.62 | 5 | –2 |
| Spanish Socialist Workers' Party (PSOE) | 5,246 | 18.23 | +6.24 | 5 | +2 |
| Convergence of Melilla (CM) | 783 | 2.72 | New | 0 | ±0 |
| Blank ballots | 396 | 1.38 | +0.26 | | |
| Total | 28,772 | | | 25 | ±0 |
| Valid votes | 28,772 | 99.44 | –0.01 | | |
| Invalid votes | 162 | 0.56 | +0.01 | | |
| Votes cast / turnout | 28,934 | 57.65 | +0.26 | | |
| Abstentions | 21,259 | 42.35 | –0.26 | | |
| Registered voters | 50,193 | | | | |

Popular vote
| PP | 55.96% |
| CpM | 21.71% |
| PSOE | 18.23% |
| CM | 2.72% |
| Blank ballots | 1.38% |

Seats
| PP | 60.00% |
| CpM | 20.00% |
| PSOE | 20.00% |
