= 2023 Melilla Assembly election =

Election in the Spanish autonomous city of Melilla

- 28 May 2023

All 25 seats in the Assembly of Melilla 13 seats needed for a majority
- Registered: 61,138 3.0%
- Turnout: 30,239 (49.5%); 8.4 pp
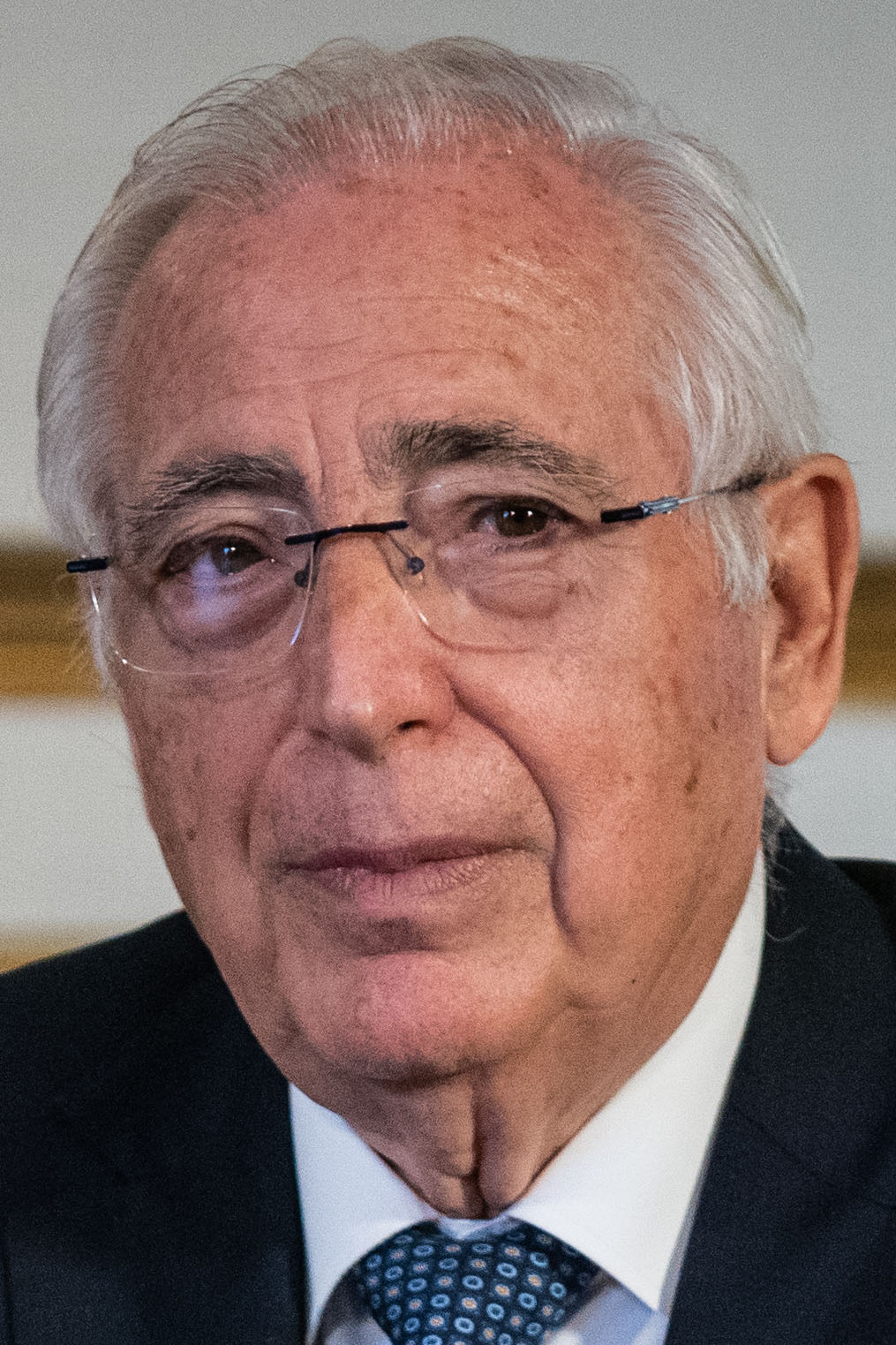

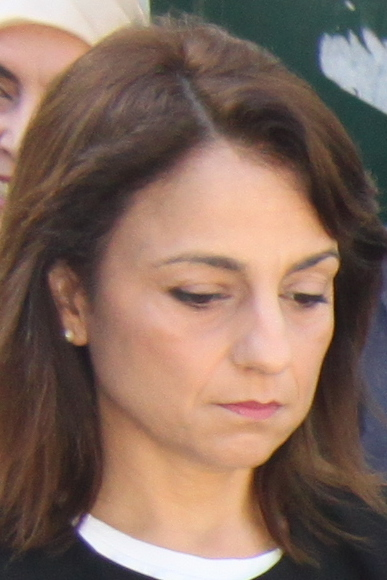

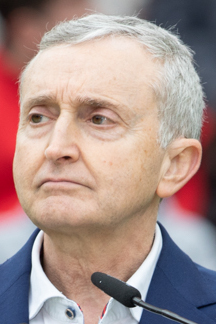

	First party	Second party	Third party
Leader	Juan José Imbroda	Dunia Almansouri	Gloria Rojas
Party	PP	CpM	PSOE
Leader since	20 July 2000	20 April 2023	24 November 2014
Last election	10 seats, 37.8%	8 seats, 30.6%	4 seats, 14.4%
Seats won	14	5	3
Seat change	4	3	1
Popular vote	15,640	5,590	3,206
Percentage	52.6%	18.8%	10.8%
Swing	14.8 pp	11.8 pp	3.6 pp
	Fourth party	Fifth party
Leader	José Miguel Tasende	Amin Azmani
Party	Vox	SML
Leader since	28 December 2022	5 April 2023
Last election	2 seats, 7.8%	0 seats, 2.0% (Note: Results for Adelante Melilla in the 2019 election.)
Seats won	2	1
Seat change	0	1
Popular vote	2,957	1,524
Percentage	9.9%	5.1%
Swing	2.1 pp	3.1 pp
Mayor-President before election
Eduardo de Castro
Independent
Elected Mayor-President
Juan José Imbroda
PP

The 2023 Melilla Assembly election was held on Sunday, 28 May 2023, to elect the 8th Assembly of the autonomous city of Melilla. All 25 seats in the Assembly were up for election. The election was held simultaneously with regional elections in twelve autonomous communities and local elections all throughout Spain.

The election campaign was shaken by a vote-buying scandal, after an unusual increase of the postal voting was detected. As a result, some parties, such as Coalition for Melilla (CpM), The Greens–Green Group (LV–GV) and Vox asked the Central Electoral Commission (JEC) to suspend the election and to cancel postal votes. On 23 May, five days before the election, ten individuals were arrested for their involvement in an attempted large-scale vote-buying fraud, including the son-in-law of Mustafa Aberchán, the leader of CpM; and Mohamed Ahmed Al-lal, third in the CpM's list and at the time regional minister in the government of Melilla. The latter was dismissed by the Mayor-President of Melilla Eduardo de Castro the following day. Moreover, two individuals linked to the People's Party (PP) were also among the arrested.

The election resulted in a dramatic rise for the PP vote, which under Juan José Imbroda secured an absolute majority of seats that allowed them to recover the regional government, and in the collapse of the CpM support, which fell from 30.6% to 18.8%. The Spanish Socialist Workers' Party (PSOE) also lost ground, whereas Vox and local party Somos Melilla (SML) saw increases in support, with the latter entering the Assembly for the first time.

== Electoral system ==
The Assembly of Melilla was the top-tier administrative and governing body of the autonomous city of Melilla. Voting for the Assembly was on the basis of universal suffrage, which comprised all nationals over eighteen, registered and residing in the municipality of Melilla and in full enjoyment of their political rights, as well as resident non-national European citizens and those whose country of origin allowed Spanish nationals to vote in their own elections by virtue of a treaty.

The 25 members of the Assembly of Melilla were elected using the D'Hondt method and a closed list proportional representation, with a threshold of five percent of valid votes—which included blank ballots—being applied.

The Mayor-President was indirectly elected by the plenary assembly. A legal clause required that mayoral candidates earned the vote of an absolute majority of councillors, or else the candidate of the most-voted party in the assembly was to be automatically appointed to the post. In the event of a tie, the appointee would be determined by lot.

== Parties and candidates ==
The electoral law allowed for parties and federations registered in the interior ministry, coalitions and groupings of electors to present lists of candidates. Parties and federations intending to form a coalition ahead of an election were required to inform the relevant Electoral Commission within ten days of the election call, whereas groupings of electors needed to secure the signature of at least one percent of the electorate in the constituencies for which they sought election, disallowing electors from signing for more than one list of candidates.

Below is a list of the main parties and electoral alliances which will likely contest the election:

Candidacy	Parties and alliances	Leading candidate	Ideology	Previous result		Gov.	Ref.
Candidacy	Parties and alliances	Leading candidate	Ideology	Votes (%)	Seats	Gov.	Ref.
PP	List: People's Party (PP)	Juan José Imbroda	Conservatism; Christian democracy	37.84%	10	X mark	
CpM	List: Coalition for Melilla (CpM)	Dunia Almansouri	Social democracy Progressivism; Regionalism	30.62%	8	check	
PSOE	List: Spanish Socialist Workers' Party (PSOE)	Gloria Rojas	Social democracy	14.41%	4	check	
Vox	List: Vox (Vox)	José Miguel Tasende	Right-wing populism Ultranationalism; National conservatism	7.76%	2	X mark	
SML	List: We Are Melilla (SML)	Amin Azmani	Localism; Centrism	1.95	0	X mark	

== Campaign ==
=== Party slogans ===
Party or alliance	Original slogan	English translation	Ref.
PP	« A ganar Melilla »	"Let's win Melilla"	
CpM	« Contigo, mayoría absoluta »	"With you, absolute majority"	
PSOE	« Gloria Rojas, política en serio »	"Gloria Rojas, politics seriously"	
Vox	« Vota seguro »	"Vote safely" / "Go vote for sure"	
SML	« Toca cambio »	"Time for change"	

== Opinion polls ==
The tables below list opinion polling results in reverse chronological order, showing the most recent first and using the dates when the survey fieldwork was done, as opposed to the date of publication. Where the fieldwork dates are unknown, the date of publication is given instead. The highest percentage figure in each polling survey is displayed with its background shaded in the leading party's colour. If a tie ensues, this is applied to the figures with the highest percentages. The "Lead" column on the right shows the percentage-point difference between the parties with the highest percentages in a poll.

=== Graphical summary ===
Local regression trend line of poll results from 26 May 2019 to 28 May 2023, with each line corresponding to a political party.

=== Voting intention estimates ===
The table below lists weighted voting intention estimates. Refusals are generally excluded from the party vote percentages, while question wording and the treatment of "don't know" responses and those not intending to vote may vary between polling organisations. When available, seat projections determined by the polling organisations are displayed below (or in place of) the percentages in a smaller font; 13 seats were required for an absolute majority in the Assembly of Melilla.

Polling firm/Commissioner	Fieldwork date	Sample size	Turnout	PP	CpM	PSOE	Vox	Cs	SML	Unidas Podemos	CR	Lead
2023 Assembly election	28 May 2023	—N/a	49.2	52.6; 14	18.8; 5	10.8; 3	9.9; 2	–	5.1; 1	1.0; 0	0.2; 0	33.8
EM-Analytics/El Plural	11–17 May 2023	250	?	36.3; 9	33.4; 9	11.7; 3	15.5; 4	1.0; 0	1.0; 0	0.0; 0	–	2.9
EM-Analytics/El Plural	4–10 May 2023	250	?	36.1; 9	33.5; 9	11.7; 3	15.6; 4	1.0; 0	1.0; 0	0.0; 0	–	2.6
SyM Consulting	30 Apr–4 May 2023	753	65.6	28.6; 8/9	39.0; 11/12	8.1; 2	10.0; 3	0.4; 0	3.3; 0	3.1; 0	3.0; 0	10.4
EM-Analytics/El Plural	26 Apr–3 May 2023	250	?	36.0; 9	33.5; 9	11.7; 3	15.7; 4	1.0; 0	1.0; 0	0.0; 0	–	2.5
EM-Analytics/El Plural	19–25 Apr 2023	250	?	35.5; 9	33.5; 9	11.7; 3	15.7; 4	1.0; 0	1.0; 0	0.0; 0	–	2.0
EM-Analytics/El Plural	12–18 Apr 2023	250	?	35.2; 9	34.7; 9	11.5; 3	16.1; 4	0.8; 0	0.9; 0	0.7; 0	–	0.5
EM-Analytics/El Plural	5–11 Apr 2023	250	?	35.2; 9	34.7; 9	11.8; 3	16.1; 4	0.8; 0	1.0; 0	0.0; 0	–	0.5
EM-Analytics/El Plural	27 Mar–4 Apr 2023	250	?	35.3; 9	33.9; 9	12.4; 3	16.4; 4	0.8; 0	1.0; 0	0.0; 0	–	1.4
SyM Consulting	27 Mar–3 Apr 2023	853	70.4	31.0; 9/10	36.8; 11	7.1; 2	10.0; 2/3	0.5; 0	2.8; 0	–	4.9; 0	5.8
GAD3/PP	2–3 Feb 2023	606	?	46.5; 13	21.8; 6	17.1; 4	8.4; 2	1.7; 0	–	–	–	24.7
SyM Consulting	8–14 Dec 2022	788	57.6	32.6; 8/9	43.9; 12	7.0; 1/2	11.8; 3	0.2; 0	–	–	–	11.3
SyM Consulting	2–5 Nov 2022	1,186	57.8	36.7; 10	41.0; 11/12	6.7; 1/2	9.9; 2	0.1; 0	–	–	–	4.3
SyM Consulting	8–11 Sep 2022	1,207	59.0	36.7; 9/10	37.0; 10	7.8; 2	13.6; 3/4	0.1; 0	–	–	–	0.3
EM-Analytics/COPE Melilla	14 Jun–12 Jul 2022	997	?	33.7; 9	33.0; 9	12.9; 3	16.4; 4	1.2; 0	1.8; 0	1.0; 0	–	0.7
EM-Analytics/COPE Melilla	13 May–13 Jun 2022	859	?	33.2; 9	33.3; 9	13.0; 3	16.4; 4	1.2; 0	1.8; 0	1.0; 0	–	0.1
SyM Consulting	8–12 Jun 2022	884	57.3	34.1; 9	38.9; 10/11	8.3; 2	13.5; 3/4	0.1; 0	–	–	–	4.8
EM-Analytics/COPE Melilla	15 Apr–12 May 2022	759	?	32.8; 9	33.5; 9	12.9; 3	16.5; 4	1.2; 0	1.8; 0	1.2; 0	–	0.7
GAD3/PP	6–9 May 2022	502	?	42.9; 11/12	21.9; 6	17.8; 4/5	12.2; 3	1.5; 0	–	–	–	21.0
SyM Consulting	1–3 Apr 2022	931	59.0	31.8; 8/9	39.7; 10/11	7.5; 2	16.4; 4	0.3; 0	–	–	–	7.9
EM-Analytics/COPE Melilla	15 Feb–30 Mar 2022	600	?	32.3; 9	33.7; 9	13.1; 3	16.5; 4	1.2; 0	1.8; 0	1.2; 0	–	1.4
Adelante Melilla	25–29 Jan 2022	586	?	? 9	? 7/8	? 2	? 3	? 0	? 3/4	? 0	–	?
SyM Consulting	16–18 Dec 2021	828	56.8	34.3; 9/10	38.1; 10/11	9.5; 2	12.6; 3	0.3; 0	–	–	–	3.8
NC Report/El Faro de Melilla	3–13 Dec 2021	700	54.5	32.5; 8	36.3; 10	11.8; 3	14.8; 4	? 0	? 0	? 0	–	3.8
EM-Analytics/Electomanía	30 Sep–13 Nov 2021	?	?	36.6; 9	33.2; 9	12.5; 3	14.9; 4	1.7; 0	–	–	–	3.4
SyM Consulting	1–3 Sep 2021	1,008	59.6	36.1; 9/10	34.3; 9/10	12.7; 3/4	10.3; 2/3	0.6; 0	–	–	–	1.8
SyM Consulting	2–5 Jun 2021	860	60.8	34.2; 9	32.5; 8/9	13.0; 3/4	15.0; 4	1.2; 0	–	–	–	1.7
SyM Consulting	1–3 Mar 2021	572	54.3	33.1; 9	34.3; 9/10	10.5; 2/3	16.4; 4	0.7; 0	–	–	–	1.2
ElectoPanel/Electomanía	15 Feb 2021	400	?	37.0; 10	34.7; 9	13.6; 3	10.5; 3	2.0; 0	–	–	–	2.3
SyM Consulting	9–12 Dec 2020	628	55.4	34.1; 9	38.9; 10/11	9.7; 2/3	11.7; 3	1.9; 0	–	–	–	4.8
SyM Consulting	26–27 Sep 2020	695	56.4	37.0; 10	35.7; 9/10	12.8; 3	9.9; 2/3	1.2; 0	–	–	–	1.3
SyM Consulting	18 Jul 2020	561	56.8	39.0; 10	35.9; 9/10	14.7; 4	6.8; 1/2	0.9; 0	–	–	–	3.1
SyM Consulting	21–23 Jun 2020	622	62.7	39.1; 10/11	32.7; 8/9	14.9; 4	9.5; 2	1.8; 0	–	–	–	6.4
ElectoPanel/Electomanía	1 Apr–15 May 2020	?	?	43.9; 12	28.9; 8	14.4; 4	6.9; 1	3.2; 0	–	–	–	15.0
SyM Consulting	5–7 May 2020	739	62.7	46.5; 12/13	29.7; 8	12.7; 3	6.3; 1/2	2.4; 0	–	–	–	16.8
SyM Consulting	17–18 Feb 2020	687	60.4	40.1; 10/11	37.3; 10	11.8; 3	5.1; 1/2	2.8; 0	–	–	–	2.8
November 2019 general election	10 Nov 2019	—N/a	52.4	29.5 (8)	29.0 (8)	16.4 (4)	18.4 (5)	3.0 (0)	2.6 (0)	–	–	0.5
2019 Assembly election	26 May 2019	—N/a	57.9	37.8; 10	30.6; 8	14.4; 4	7.8; 2	5.6; 1	2.0; 0	1.2; 0	–	7.2

== Results ==
← Summary of the 28 May 2023 Assembly of Melilla election results →
Parties and alliances	Popular vote			Seats	
Parties and alliances	Votes	%	±pp	Total	+/−
People's Party (PP)	15,640	52.57	+14.73	14	+4
Coalition for Melilla (CpM)	5,590	18.79	–11.83	5	–3
Spanish Socialist Workers' Party (PSOE)	3,206	10.78	–3.63	3	–1
Vox (Vox)	2,957	9.94	+2.18	2	±0
We Are Melilla (SML)^{1}	1,524	5.12	+3.17	1	+1
We Can (Podemos)^{2}	290	0.97	–0.22	0	±0
Forward Melilla (ADEME)	78	0.26	New	0	±0
Creating Melilla (CREAME)	74	0.25	New	0	±0
Citizens–Party of the Citizenry (Cs)	n/a	n/a	–5.55	0	–1
Blank ballots	394	1.32	+0.86		
Total	29,753			25	±0
Valid votes	29,753	98.39	–1.06		
Invalid votes	486	1.61	+1.06		
Votes cast / turnout	30,239	49.46	–8.48		
Abstentions	30,899	50.54	+8.48		
Registered voters	61,138				
Sources
Footnotes: ^{1} We Are Melilla results are compared to the totals of Forward Melilla in the 2019 election.; ^{2} We Can results are compared to the totals of United We Can–United Left–Equo in the 2019 election.

Popular vote
PP	52.57%
CpM	18.79%
PSOE	10.78%
Vox	9.94%
SML	5.12%
Others	1.49%
Blank ballots	1.32%

Seats
PP	56.00%
CpM	20.00%
PSOE	12.00%
Vox	8.00%
SML	4.00%
