= 2019 Melilla Assembly election =

Election in the Spanish autonomous city of Melilla

- 26 May 2019

All 25 seats in the Assembly of Melilla 13 seats needed for a majority
- Registered: 59,355 2.9%
- Turnout: 34,393 (57.9%); 1.8 pp
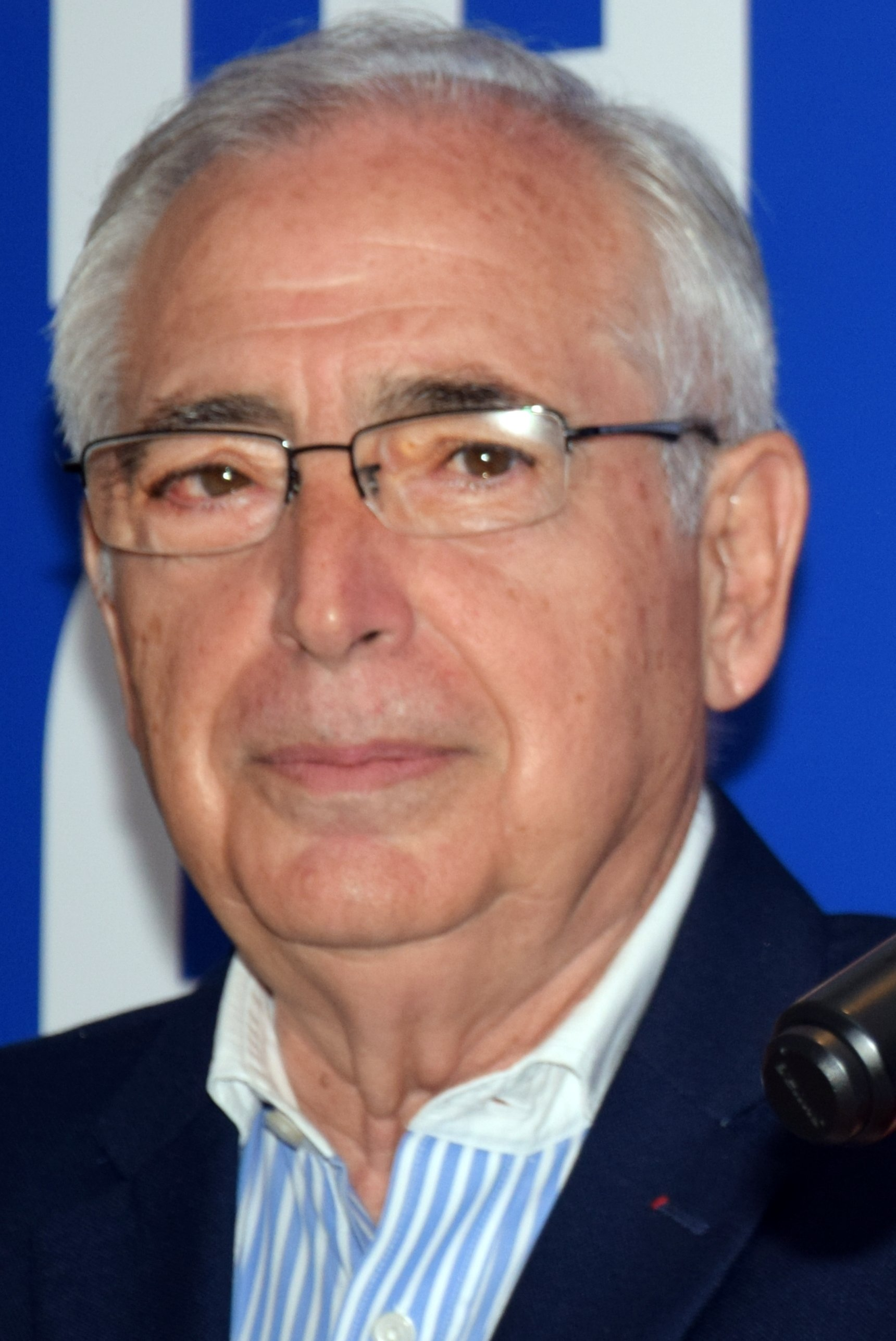

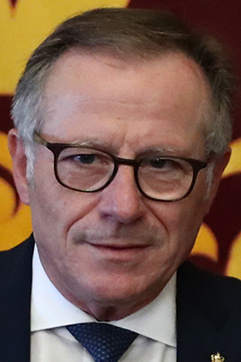
	First party	Second party	Third party
Leader	Juan José Imbroda	Mustafa Aberchán	Gloria Rojas
Party	PP	CpM	PSOE
Leader since	20 July 2000	2 October 1995	24 November 2014
Last election	13 seats, 48.1% (Note: Aggregated data for PP and PPL in the 2015 election.)	7 seats, 26.4%	3 seats, 12.6%
Seats won	10	8	4
Seat change	3	1	1
Popular vote	12,943	10,472	4,928
Percentage	37.8%	30.6%	14.4%
Swing	10.3 pp	4.2 pp	1.8 pp
	Fourth party	Fifth party
Leader	Jesús Delgado Aboy	Eduardo de Castro
Party	Vox	Cs
Leader since	15 July 2018	23 February 2015
Last election	Did not contest	2 seats, 6.8%
Seats won	2	1
Seat change	2	1
Popular vote	2,655	1,897
Percentage	7.8%	5.6%
Swing	New party	1.2 pp
Mayor-President before election
Juan José Imbroda
PP
Elected Mayor-President
Eduardo de Castro
Cs

The 2019 Melilla Assembly election was held on Sunday, 26 May 2019, to elect the 7th Assembly of the Autonomous City of Melilla. All 25 seats in the Assembly were up for election. The election was held simultaneously with regional elections in thirteen autonomous communities and local elections all throughout Spain, as well as the 2019 European Parliament election.

== Electoral system ==
The Assembly of Melilla is the top-tier administrative and governing body of the autonomous city of Melilla. Voting for the Assembly is on the basis of universal suffrage, which comprises all nationals over eighteen, registered and residing in the municipality of Melilla and in full enjoyment of their political rights, as well as resident non-national European citizens and those whose country of origin allows Spanish nationals to vote in their own elections by virtue of a treaty.

The 25 members of the Assembly of Melilla are elected using the D'Hondt method and a closed list proportional representation, with a threshold of 5 percent of valid votes—which includes blank ballots—being applied. Parties not reaching the threshold are not taken into consideration for seat distribution.

The Mayor-President is indirectly elected by the plenary assembly. A legal clause requires that mayoral candidates earn the vote of an absolute majority of members, or else the candidate of the most-voted party in the assembly shall be automatically appointed to the post. In case of a tie, a toss-up would determine the appointee.

== Parties and candidates ==
The electoral law allowed for parties and federations registered in the interior ministry, coalitions and groupings of electors to present lists of candidates. Parties and federations intending to form a coalition ahead of an election were required to inform the relevant Electoral Commission within ten days of the election call, whereas groupings of electors needed to secure the signature of at least one percent of the electorate in the constituencies for which they sought election, disallowing electors from signing for more than one list of candidates.

== Opinion polls ==
The table below lists voting intention estimates in reverse chronological order, showing the most recent first and using the dates when the survey fieldwork was done, as opposed to the date of publication. Where the fieldwork dates are unknown, the date of publication is given instead. The highest percentage figure in each polling survey is displayed with its background shaded in the leading party's colour. If a tie ensues, this is applied to the figures with the highest percentages. The "Lead" column on the right shows the percentage-point difference between the parties with the highest percentages in a poll. When available, seat projections determined by the polling organisations are displayed below (or in place of) the percentages in a smaller font; 13 seats were required for an absolute majority in the Assembly of Melilla.

Polling firm/Commissioner	Fieldwork date	Sample size	Turnout	PP	CpM	PSOE	Cs	PPL	Podemos	UPyD	Vox	Unidas Podemos	Lead
2019 Assembly election	26 May 2019	—N/a	63.4	37.8; 10	30.6; 8	14.4; 4	5.6; 1	(Note: Within PP.)	(Note: Within Unidas Podemos.)	0.2; 0	7.8; 2	1.2; 0	7.2
April 2019 general election	28 Apr 2019	—N/a	63.0	23.9 (7)	20.4 (5)	20.7 (6)	12.9 (3)			–	16.9 (4)	3.8 (0)	3.5
ElectoPanel/Electomanía	31 Mar–7 Apr 2019	?	?	21.7; 6	34.0; 9	16.3; 4	9.4; 2			–	16.0; 4	1.0; 0	12.3
SyM Consulting	4–5 Apr 2019	756	54.9	23.7; 6/7	30.9; 8/9	13.8; 4	9.3; 2		–	–	16.6; 4	–	7.2
ElectoPanel/Electomanía	24–31 Mar 2019	?	?	20.6; 5	35.0; 10	16.0; 4	9.2; 2			–	16.7; 4	1.0; 0	14.4
ElectoPanel/Electomanía	17–24 Mar 2019	?	?	20.9; 6	34.8; 9	16.5; 4	8.5; 2			–	16.6; 4	1.0; 0	13.9
ElectoPanel/Electomanía	10–17 Mar 2019	?	?	20.3; 5	34.8; 9	15.8; 4	7.2; 2			–	19.7; 5	1.0; 0	14.5
ElectoPanel/Electomanía	3–10 Mar 2019	?	?	20.0; 5	34.8; 9	15.6; 4	7.5; 2			–	19.5; 5	1.0; 0	14.8
ElectoPanel/Electomanía	22 Feb–3 Mar 2019	?	?	19.9; 5	35.0; 9	15.2; 4	7.7; 2			–	19.7; 5	0.9; 0	15.1
SyM Consulting	1–2 Feb 2019	464	55.8	23.4; 6/7	33.2; 9	14.4; 3/4	6.1; 1		–	–	18.2; 5	–	9.8
SyM Consulting	11 Jan 2019	?	?	20.9; 5/6	36.1; 10	9.3; 2	10.6; 2/3		–	–	18.6; 5	–	15.2
SyM Consulting	7–9 Sep 2018	506	59.2	36.5; 10	31.9; 8/9	13.2; 3	13.5; 3/4		0.9; 0	–	–	–	4.6
SyM Consulting	24–26 Apr 2018	521	57.2	32.2; 9	31.6; 8/9	12.9; 3	17.5; 4/5		2.0; 0	–	–	–	0.6
SyM Consulting	8–9 Jan 2018	491	58.0	32.8; 8/9	30.6; 8/9	12.3; 2/3	18.4; 4/5		2.1; 0	–	–	–	2.2
SyM Consulting	13–14 Jun 2017	531	60.4	39.9; 11	30.7; 8/9	10.2; 2/3	12.2; 3		3.1; 0	–	–	–	9.2
SyM Consulting	14–15 Mar 2017	535	67.5	38.1; 10/11	28.0; 8	9.7; 2/3	10.6; 2/3		3.7; 0	0.6; 0	–	–	10.1
SyM Consulting	10–11 Jan 2017	546	64.8	37.6; 10	27.6; 8	8.5; 2	10.7; 3		8.0; 2	2.7; 0	–	–	10.0
2016 general election	26 Jun 2016	—N/a	47.6	49.9 (13)	–	25.1 (7)	12.4 (3)	–		0.5 (0)	–	9.8 (2)	24.8
2015 general election	20 Dec 2015	—N/a	49.4	43.9 (12)	–	24.6 (6)	15.5 (4)	–	11.4 (3)	0.9 (0)	–	–	19.3
2015 Assembly election	24 May 2015	—N/a	56.1	42.7; 12	26.4; 7	12.6; 3	6.8; 2	5.4; 1	2.6; 0	1.1; 0	–	–	16.3

== Results ==
← Summary of the 26 May 2019 Assembly of Melilla election results →
Parties and alliances	Popular vote			Seats	
Parties and alliances	Votes	%	±pp	Total	+/−
People's Party (PP)^{1}	12,943	37.84	–10.31	10	–3
Coalition for Melilla (CpM)	10,472	30.62	+4.21	8	+1
Spanish Socialist Workers' Party (PSOE)	4,928	14.41	+1.82	4	+1
Vox (Vox)	2,655	7.76	New	2	+2
Citizens–Party of the Citizenry (Cs)	1,897	5.55	–1.20	1	–1
Forward Melilla (Adelante Melilla)	667	1.95	New	0	±0
United We Can–United Left (Podemos–IU)^{2}	408	1.19	–2.20	0	±0
Union, Progress and Democracy (UPyD)	77	0.23	–0.87	0	±0
Blank ballots	158	0.46	–0.52		
Total	34,205			25	±0
Valid votes	34,205	99.45	+0.68		
Invalid votes	188	0.55	–0.68		
Votes cast / turnout	34,393	57.94	+1.79		
Abstentions	24,962	42.06	–1.79		
Registered voters	59,355				
Sources
Footnotes: ^{1} People's Party results are compared to the combined totals of People's Party and Populars in Freedom Party in the 2015 election.; ^{2} United We Can–United Left–Equo results are compared to the combined totals of We Can and United Left in the 2015 election.

Popular vote
PP	37.84%
CpM	30.62%
PSOE	14.41%
Vox	7.76%
Cs	5.55%
Adelante Melilla	1.95%
Podemos–IU	1.19%
UPyD	0.23%
Blank ballots	0.46%

Seats
PP	40.00%
CpM	32.00%
PSOE	16.00%
Vox	8.00%
Cs	4.00%

== Aftermath ==
Investiture
Ballot →	15 June 2019	
Required majority →	13 out of 25	
Eduardo de Castro (Cs): • Cs (1); • CpM (8); • PSOE (4)	13 / 25	check
Juan José Imbroda (PP): • PP (10); • Vox (2)	12 / 25	X mark
Blank ballots	0 / 33	
Absentees	0 / 33	
