= Statue of Francisco Franco =

Statue of Francisco Franco may refer to:

- Equestrian statue of Francisco Franco, formerly in Madrid – by José Capuz, 1956
- Statue of Francisco Franco, Melilla – by Enrique Novo Álvarez, 1978
