= Melillan People's Union =

Melillan People's Union Unión del Pueblo Melillense
- Leader: Juan José Imbroda
- Founded: 1985
- Dissolved: 2003
- Merged into: People's Party
- Headquarters: Melilla
- Ideology: Spanish nationalism Localism; Conservatism
- Political position: Right-wing

Melillan People's Union (Spanish: Unión del Pueblo Melillense; UPM) was a Spanish political party based in Melilla. It existed between 1985 and 2003, when it merged into the nationwide People's Party (PP). The UPM elected three councillors in the 1987 Spanish local elections, then elected twelve in coalition with the People's Party in the 1991 Spanish local elections. The UPM won two seats in the 1995 Melilla Assembly election (the city's first regional election), and three seats in the 1999 election. Juan José Imbroda of the UPM became Mayor-President of Melilla in July 2000, following a vote of no confidence against Mustafa Aberchán. In the 2003 election, the party ran in a coalition with the People's Party, winning 15 out of 25 seats.
