= Enrique Palacios Hernández =

Spanish politician

Mayor-President of Melilla
- In office 3 March 1998 – 5 July 1999
- Preceded by: Ignacio Velázquez Rivera
- Succeeded by: Mustafa Aberchán

Personal details
- Born: 1952 (age 73–74)
- Party: People's Party of Melilla; Independent Party of Melilla

Enrique Palacios Hernández is a Spanish politician who served as the second Mayor-President of Melilla, a Spanish enclave on the north coast of Africa, from 3 March 1998 until 5 July 1999.
