= Statue of Francisco Franco, Melilla =

Last remaining statue of Francisco Franco in Spain

Statue of Francisco Franco
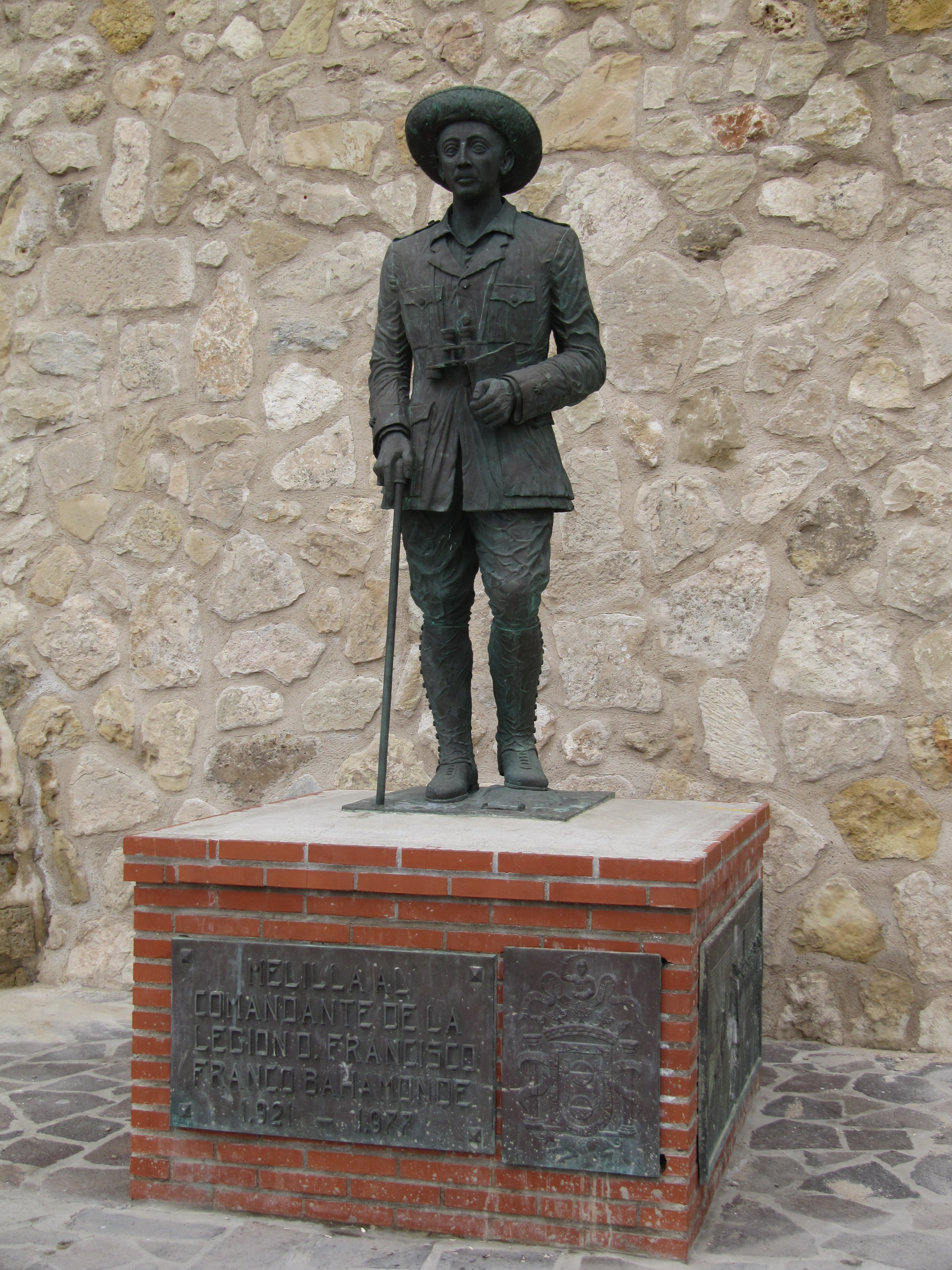
- The statue in its public location in 2010
- Interactive map of Statue of Francisco Franco
- Location: Cuesta de la Florentina, Melilla, Spain
- Coordinates: 35°17′34″N 02°56′01″W
- Designer: Enrique Novo Álvarez
- Type: Statue
- Material: Bronze
- Completion date: 1978
- Dedicated to: Francisco Franco
- Dismantled date: 23 February 2021

The statue of Francisco Franco in the Spanish North African exclave of Melilla was the last remaining public one honouring Francisco Franco, the Nationalist leader during the Spanish Civil War and the dictator of Spain from 1939 until his death in 1975. Since the passing of the Law of Historical Memory, public symbols of him or exalting his regime, have been declared illegal. The statue survived until 2021 in public, on the technicality that it depicted Franco before the civil war and his dictatorship.

== Background ==
Melilla, a city in which Franco served in the Rif War and the Spanish protectorate in Morocco, still has several public homages to the dictator. Its city hall is the only one in the country to still display his image. Until 2010, the city also had an equestrian statue of the dictator at a barracks; it was loaned to Fundación Gaselec, the city's privatised electricity provider, so its display could be legal. As of 2007, the city had 56 streets named after figures of Franco's regime.

== Description ==
Cast in bronze by Enrique Novo Álvarez, a former lieutenant colonel, it was erected in 1978 with no official ceremony. It had been commissioned days after the dictator's death, and Novo Álvarez won a nationwide competition to receive a tender of 3 million pesetas. The statue was allowed to remain in public on the argument that it depicts Franco as commander of the Spanish foreign legion in the Rif War, over a decade before the Spanish Civil War and his dictatorship; it was maintained by right- and left-wing city councils.

In 2005, the statue was moved to a new position away from the waterfront, due to the laying of a new pavement. In June 2015, members of the local Civil Guard – a gendarmerie force controversial for their actions during the dictatorship – provoked outrage from some politicians for posing for a photograph with the statue.

== Removal ==
In October 2019, Gloria Rojas, leader of the local Socialist Workers' Party (PSOE) and regional vice president, proposed the removal of the statue after the November elections. In February 2020, Rojas said that discussions were being held with the other member parties of the local government – Citizens and Coalition for Melilla – and that the statue's destination would be in the city. It was removed on 23 February 2021.
