= 1995 Melilla Assembly election =

Election in the Spanish autonomous city of Melilla

The 1995 Melilla Assembly election was held on Sunday, 28 May 1995, to elect the 1st Assembly of the Autonomous City of Melilla. All 25 seats in the Assembly were up for election. The election was held simultaneously with regional elections in thirteen autonomous communities and local elections all throughout Spain.

== Electoral system ==
The Assembly of Melilla was the top-tier administrative and governing body of the autonomous city of Melilla. Voting for the Assembly was on the basis of universal suffrage, which comprised all nationals over eighteen, registered and residing in the municipality of Melilla and in full enjoyment of their political rights, as well as resident non-nationals whose country of origin allowed Spanish nationals to vote in their own elections by virtue of a treaty.

The 25 members of the Assembly of Melilla were elected using the D'Hondt method and a closed list proportional representation, with a threshold of 5 percent of valid votes—which included blank ballots—being applied. Parties not reaching the threshold were not taken into consideration for seat distribution.

The Mayor-President was indirectly elected by the plenary assembly. A legal clause required that mayoral candidates earned the vote of an absolute majority of members, or else the candidate of the most-voted party in the assembly was to be automatically appointed to the post. In case of a tie, a toss-up would determine the appointee.

== Parties and candidates ==
The electoral law allowed for parties and federations registered in the interior ministry, coalitions and groupings of electors to present lists of candidates. Parties and federations intending to form a coalition ahead of an election were required to inform the relevant Electoral Commission within ten days of the election call, whereas groupings of electors needed to secure the signature of at least one percent of the electorate in the constituencies for which they sought election, disallowing electors from signing for more than one list of candidates.

== Results ==
Summary of the 28 May 1995 Assembly of Melilla election results →
Parties and alliances	Popular vote			Seats	
Parties and alliances	Votes	%	±pp	Total	+/−
People's Party (PP)	12,425	47.20	+4.96	14	+2
Spanish Socialist Workers' Party (PSOE)	5,232	19.88	–20.66	5	–6
Coalition for Melilla (CpM)	4,072	15.47	New	4	+4
Melillan People's Union (UPM)	2,605	9.90	New	2	+2
Nationalist Party of Melilla (PNM)	1,008	3.83	–4.77	0	–2
United Left (IU)	715	2.72	New	0	±0
Blank ballots	265	1.01	+0.12		
Total	26,322			25	±0
Valid votes	26,322	99.58	–0.10		
Invalid votes	110	0.42	+0.10		
Votes cast / turnout	26,432	61.73	+4.34		
Abstentions	16,388	38.27	–4.34		
Registered voters	42,820				

Popular vote
PP	47.20%
PSOE	19.88%
CpM	15.47%
UPM	9.90%
PNM	3.83%
IU	2.72%
Blank ballots	1.01%

Seats
PP	56.00%
PSOE	20.00%
CpM	16.00%
UPM	8.00%
