= 1999 Melilla Assembly election =

Election in the Spanish autonomous city of Melilla

The 1999 Melilla Assembly election was held on Sunday, 13 June 1999, to elect the 2nd Assembly of the Autonomous City of Melilla. All 25 seats in the Assembly were up for election. The election was held simultaneously with regional elections in thirteen autonomous communities and local elections all throughout Spain, as well as the 1999 European Parliament election.

== Electoral system ==
The Assembly of Melilla was the top-tier administrative and governing body of the autonomous city of Melilla. Voting for the Assembly was on the basis of universal suffrage, which comprised all nationals over eighteen, registered and residing in the municipality of Melilla and in full enjoyment of their political rights, as well as resident non-national European citizens and those whose country of origin allowed Spanish nationals to vote in their own elections by virtue of a treaty.

The 25 members of the Assembly of Melilla were elected using the D'Hondt method and a closed list proportional representation, with a threshold of 5 percent of valid votes—which included blank ballots—being applied. Parties not reaching the threshold were not taken into consideration for seat distribution.

The Mayor-President was indirectly elected by the plenary assembly. A legal clause required that mayoral candidates earned the vote of an absolute majority of members, or else the candidate of the most-voted party in the assembly was to be automatically appointed to the post. In case of a tie, a toss-up would determine the appointee.

== Parties and candidates ==
The electoral law allowed for parties and federations registered in the interior ministry, coalitions and groupings of electors to present lists of candidates. Parties and federations intending to form a coalition ahead of an election were required to inform the relevant Electoral Commission within ten days of the election call, whereas groupings of electors needed to secure the signature of at least one percent of the electorate in the constituencies for which they sought election, disallowing electors from signing for more than one list of candidates.

== Results ==
← Summary of the 13 June 1999 Assembly of Melilla election results →
Parties and alliances	Popular vote			Seats	
Parties and alliances	Votes	%	±pp	Total	+/−
Liberal Independent Group (GIL)	7,402	25.93	New	7	+7
Coalition for Melilla (CpM)	5,833	20.44	+4.97	5	+1
People's Party (PP)	5,338	18.70	–28.50	5	–9
Melillan People's Union (UPM)	3,258	11.41	+1.51	3	+1
Independent Party of Melilla (PIM)	2,941	10.30	New	3	+3
Spanish Socialist Workers' Party (PSOE)	2,674	9.37	–10.51	2	–3
Social Democratic Party of Melilla (PSDM)	498	1.74	New	0	±0
United Left of Melilla (IU)	254	0.89	–1.83	0	±0
Nationalist Aprome (Aprome)	49	0.17	–3.66	0	±0
Blank ballots	297	1.04	+0.03		
Total	28,544			25	±0
Valid votes	28,544	99.67	+0.09		
Invalid votes	94	0.33	–0.09		
Votes cast / turnout	28,638	60.44	–1.29		
Abstentions	18,748	39.56	+1.29		
Registered voters	47,386				

Popular vote
GIL	25.93%
CpM	20.44%
PP	18.70%
UPM	11.41%
PIM	10.30%
PSOE	9.37%
PSDM	1.74%
Others	1.06%
Blank ballots	1.04%

Seats
GIL	28.00%
CpM	20.00%
PP	20.00%
UPM	12.00%
PIM	12.00%
PSOE	8.00%
