= Mayor-President of Melilla =

Spanish municipal political office

- Flag of Melilla

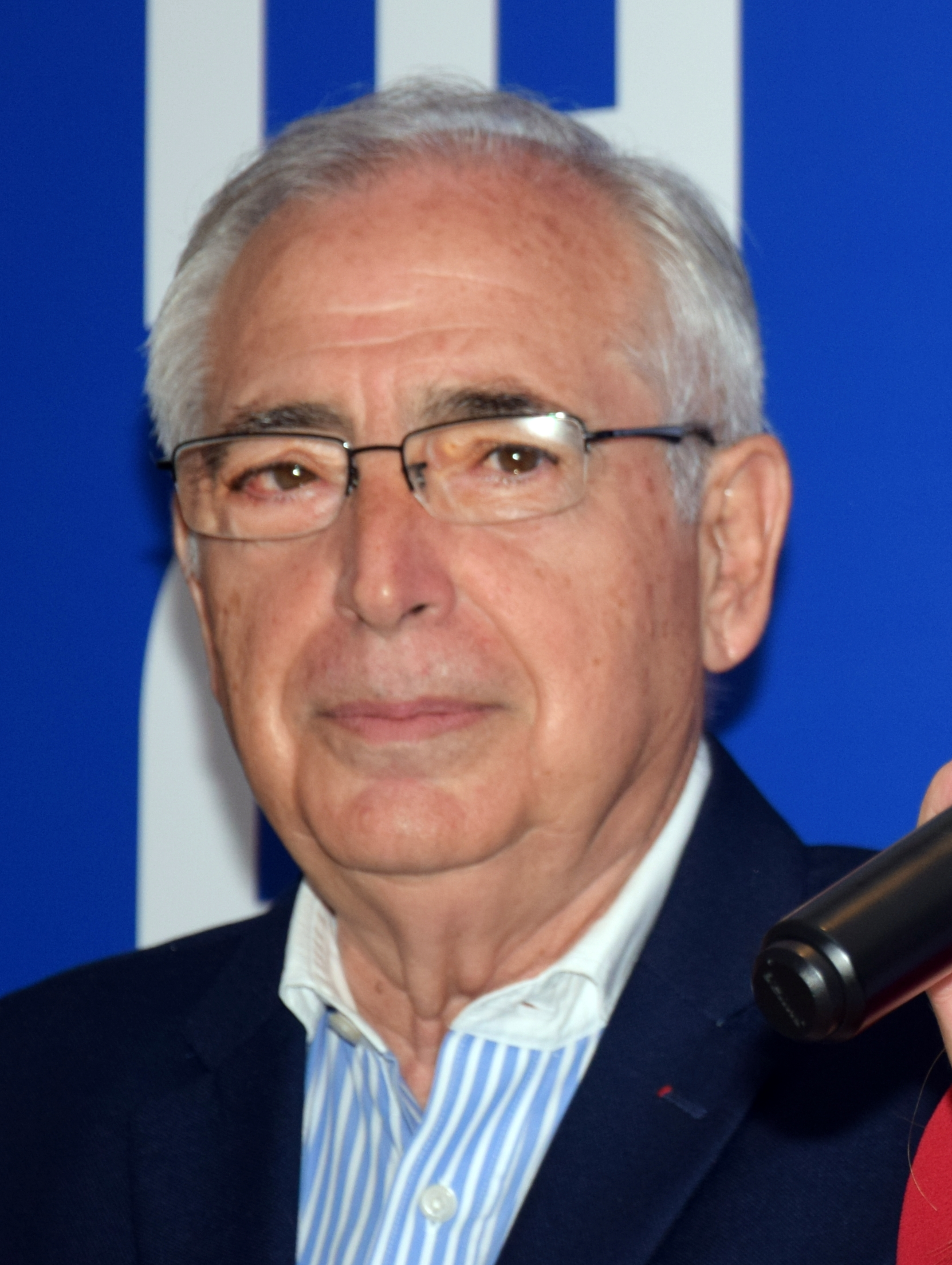
- Incumbent; Juan José Imbroda since 7 July 2023
- Nominator: Assembly of Melilla
- Appointer: The Monarch countersigned by the Prime Minister
- Term length: Four years; no limit.
- Inaugural holder: Ignacio Velázquez Rivera
- Formation: 14 March 1995

The Mayor-President of the Autonomous City of Melilla (Spanish: Presidente de la Ciudad Autónoma de Melilla) or simply the President of Melilla, is the highest authority of the Spanish autonomous city of Melilla, acting as head of government and as presiding officer of the Assembly of Melilla.

The current and 6th Mayor-President of Melilla is Juan José Imbroda of the People's Party, who has held the office since 7 July 2023 and previously from 20 July 2000 to 15 June 2019. Prior to March 1995, when the enclave's Statute of Autonomy was passed, the city was part of Province of Málaga.

== Duties and powers ==
The mayor-president has the responsibility to lead the government; appoint the government members; represent the City; convene and preside over the sessions of the Plenary; design, develop and execute the powers entrusted to the autonomous cities by the Constitution; dictate regulations; execute the budget; head the civil service and hire, fire or sanction the personnel at its service; head the local police; lead the urban planning; exercise all judicial actions to defend the interests of the City; and adopt all necessary measures in case of catastrophe.

== Election ==
The election system follows the general guidelines of all mayoral elections. The citizens vote for the local assemblies or councils on the basis of universal suffrage, with all nationals over eighteen, registered in the corresponding municipality and in full enjoyment of all political rights entitled to vote. The mayor-president is in turn elected by the plenary Assembly of Melilla, with a legal clause providing for the candidate of the most-voted party to be automatically elected to the post in the event no other candidate is to gather an absolute majority of votes.

=== Cessation ===
The general cases of cessation are death, incapacitation or resignation.

As in the regional or State governments, the mayor-president can be removed by a vote of no confidence approved by the majority of the local assembly. This motion necessarily needs to proposed an alternative candidate, being a constructive vote of no confidence.

The mayor-president itself can also propose a vote of confidence in order to pass a relevant legislation and if the mayor-president fails to overcome the motion, the mayor must submit his resignation. The mayor-president can't propose more than one vote of confidence per year and this kind of motions can't be proposed on the last year of legislature.

In both processes, the mayor-president can not preside over the session, so it will correspond to one of the Vice Presidents of the Assembly.

== List of Mayor-Presidents of Melilla ==
For a list of leaders in the period prior to Melilla becoming an autonomous community (before 1995), see: List of governors of Melilla

Governments:

- PP
- Mixed coalition

Portrait	Name (Birth–Death)	Term of office			Party	Government Composition	Election	Monarch (Reign)	Ref.
Portrait	Name (Birth–Death)	Took office	Left office	Duration	Party	Government Composition	Election	Monarch (Reign)	Ref.
	Ignacio Velázquez Rivera (born 1953)	14 March 1995	3 March 1998 (censured)	2 years and 354 days	PP	Velázquez; PP	1995	King; Juan Carlos I (1975–2014)	
	Enrique Palacios Hernández (born 1952)	3 March 1998	5 July 1999	1 year and 124 days	Independent	Palacios; PSOE–CpM–UPM	1995	King; Juan Carlos I (1975–2014)	
	Mustafa Aberchán (born 1959)	5 July 1999	19 July 2000 (censured)	1 year and 14 days	CpM	Aberchán; CpM–GIL–PIM	1999	King; Juan Carlos I (1975–2014)	
	Juan José Imbroda (born 1944)	19 July 2000	14 June 2003	19 years and 345 days	UPM	Imbroda I UPM–PP	1999	King; Juan Carlos I (1975–2014)	
	Juan José Imbroda (born 1944)	14 June 2003	6 July 2007	19 years and 345 days	PP	Imbroda II; PP	2003	King; Juan Carlos I (1975–2014)	
	Juan José Imbroda (born 1944)	6 July 2007	1 July 2011	19 years and 345 days	PP	Imbroda III; PP	2007	King; Juan Carlos I (1975–2014)	
	Juan José Imbroda (born 1944)	1 July 2011	3 July 2015	19 years and 345 days	PP	Imbroda IV; PP	2011	King; Felipe VI (2014–present)	
	Juan José Imbroda (born 1944)	3 July 2015	15 June 2019	19 years and 345 days	PP	Imbroda V PP–PPL	2015	King; Felipe VI (2014–present)	
	Eduardo de Castro (born 1957)	15 June 2019	7 July 2023	4 years and 22 days	Cs	de Castro; Cs–CpM–PSOE until Apr 2021; CpM–PSOE from Apr 2021	2019	King; Felipe VI (2014–present)	
	Eduardo de Castro (born 1957)	15 June 2019	7 July 2023	4 years and 22 days	Independent	de Castro; Cs–CpM–PSOE until Apr 2021; CpM–PSOE from Apr 2021	2019	King; Felipe VI (2014–present)	
	Juan José Imbroda (born 1944)	7 July 2023	Incumbent	3 years and 62 days	PP	Imbroda VI; PP	2023	King; Felipe VI (2014–present)	

== Sources ==
- World Statesmen.org
