= Eduardo de Castro =

Spanish politician (born 1957)

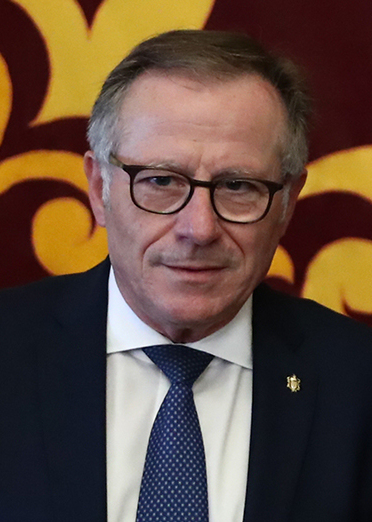

Mayor-President of Melilla
- In office 15 June 2019 – 7 July 2023
- Deputy: Gloria Rojas
- Preceded by: Juan José Imbroda
- Succeeded by: Juan José Imbroda

Member of the Assembly of Melilla
- In office 15 June 2015 – 7 July 2023

Personal details
- Born: Eduardo de Castro González; 3 March 1957 (age 69) Melilla, Spain
- Party: Independent (since 2021)
- Other political affiliations: Citizens (2015–2021)
- Education: University of Granada

Eduardo de Castro González (born 3 March 1957) is a Spanish public servant and politician who served as the Mayor-President of the autonomous city of Melilla from 2019 until 2023. He was a member of the Assembly of Melilla from 2015 to 2023.

== Biography ==
De Castro was born in Melilla in 1957. He studied labor relations at the University of Granada. From a young age, he worked as a public servant for the Ministry of the Interior and the Government of Melilla, including coordination and management jobs.

In 2015, De Castro became involved in politics, and he was designated candidate of the political party Citizens for Mayor-President of Melilla. In the 2015 Melilla Assembly election, Citizens obtained 2 out of 25 seats.

In the 2019 Melilla Assembly election, De Castro repeated as candidate of Citizens for Mayor-President. Citizens obtained 1 out of 25 seats, De Castro's own seat. At the investiture vote held on 15 June 2019, De Castro put forward his candidature for Mayor-President. With the support of the Coalition for Melilla (8 seats) and the Spanish Socialist Workers' Party (4 seats), he earned the vote of an absolute majority of members (13 out of 25 members) and was elected as Mayor-President, ending the nineteen-year tenure of his predecessor Juan José Imbroda.

In April 2021, de Castro was expelled from Citizens due to an ongoing investigation for alleged perversion of justice vis-à-vis irregularities with the crane service concession in Melilla.
