= Moraleja de Sayago =

Coordinates: 41°10′N 6°00′W

Moraleja de Sayago, Spain
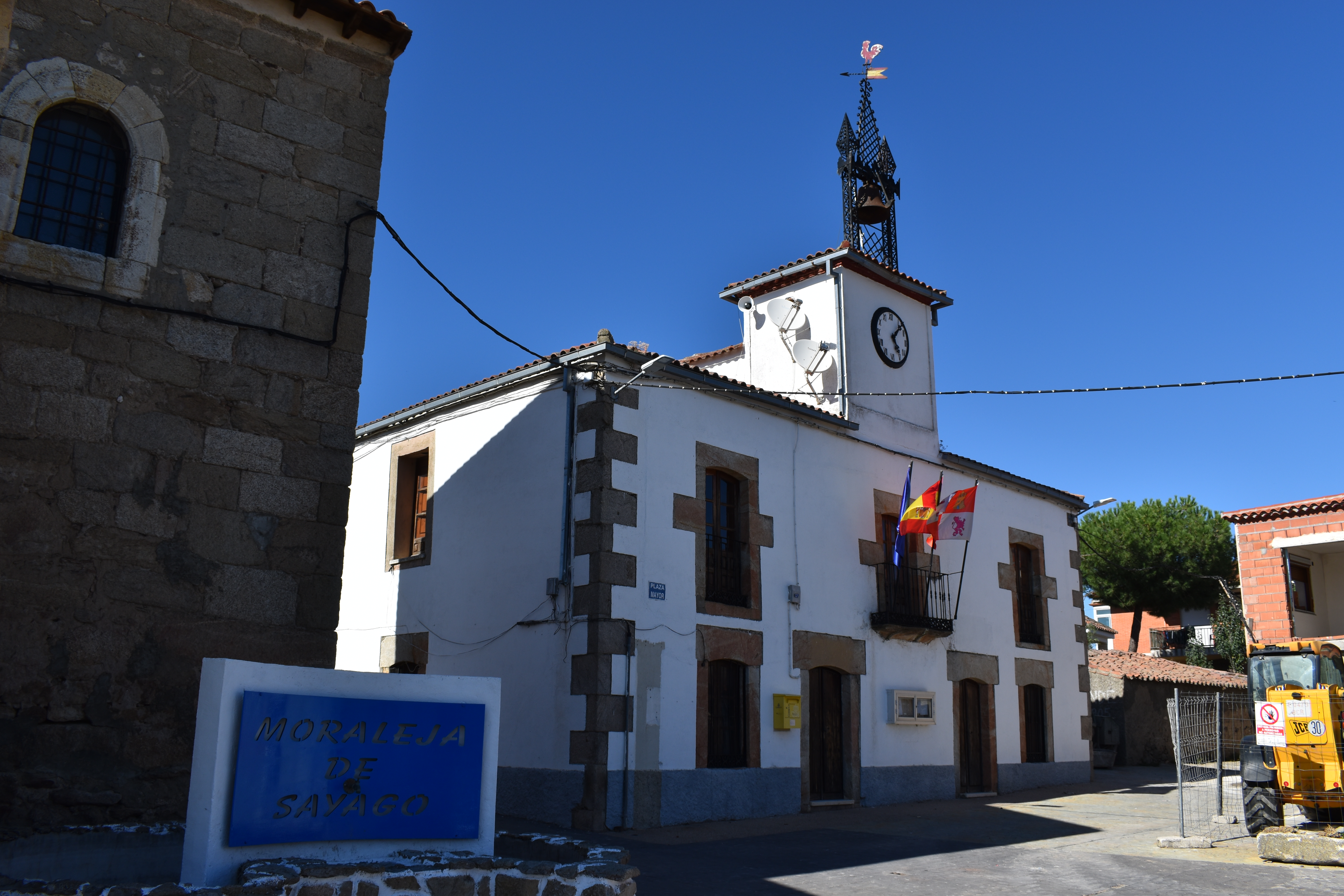
- Town hall
- Interactive map of Moraleja de Sayago, Spain
- Country: Spain
- Autonomous community: Castile and León
- Province: Zamora
- Municipality: Moraleja de Sayago

Area
  - Total: 33 km^{2} (13 sq mi)

Population (2025-01-01)
  - Total: 300
  - Density: 9.1/km^{2} (24/sq mi)
- Time zone: UTC+1 (CET)
  - Summer (DST): UTC+2 (CEST)

Moraleja de Sayago is a municipality located in the province of Zamora, Castile and León, Spain. According to the 2004 census (INE), the municipality has a population of 296 inhabitants.
