= Nationalist Party of the Rif of Melilla =

Nationalist Party of the Rif of Melilla (in Spanish: Partido Nacionalista del Rif de Melilla) is a political party in Melilla, Spain. PNRIF was formed ahead of the 2003 election to the Assembly of Melilla. The founding president of the party is Mimon Kabbur Hussien, a former Partido Popular member. PNRIF presents itself as a secular party, striving to protect the culture of the Berber people.

All of the 28 election candidates of PNRIF were from the Muslim community. PNRIF got 101 votes (0.36% of the votes in Melilla), and no seat.
