= Alcalde-presidente =

An alcalde-presidente is an alcalde (Spanish for municipal mayor) who also functions as president(e) of a higher administrative level.

Cases include:

- colonial San Juan on Puerto Rico, 1879–1902; the last one succeeded himself as first 'normal' alcalde
- in Spain:
  - Mayor-President of Ceuta, the head of government of Ceuta, an autonomous city
  - Mayor-President of Melilla, the head of government of Melilla, autonomous city

As Singapore is a city-state, its president can be thought of a mayor who also functions as a president of a higher (in this case, the highest) administrative level; however, the President of Singapore, though not entirely ceremonial, is not the city-state's chief executive. The prime minister is.

== Sources ==
- WorldStatesmen- here US Cities
