= Ignacio Velázquez Rivera =

Spanish politician

Mayor-President of Melilla
- In office 14 March 1995 – 3 March 1998
- Preceded by: Office established
- Succeeded by: Enrique Palacios Hernández

Personal details
- Born: 1953 (age 72–73) Ceuta, Spain
- Party: People's Party (before 2011) People's Freedom Party (2011-present)

Ignacio Velázquez Rivera (born 1953) was a Spanish politician who served as mayor of Melilla from 1991 and became the first Mayor-President on 14 March 1995 when it became an autonomous community. He held the post until 1998.

Velázquez was born in Ceuta, one of the other Spanish exclaves in mainland Africa.
