= Somos Melilla =

- President: Amín Azmani
- Founded: 2019 (as Adelante Melilla); 10 October 2022
- Headquarters: Melilla
- Ideology: Regionalism
- Political position: Centre
- Assembly of Melilla: 1 / 25

Website
- www.somosmelilla.es

Somos Melilla (English: We Are Melilla, SML) is a political party in the Spanish city of Melilla. Until 2022 it was branded as Adelante Melilla (English: Forward Melilla).
