= People's Party of Melilla =

People's Party of Melilla Partido Popular de Melilla
- President: Juan José Imbroda
- Secretary-General: Miguel Marín Cobos
- Founded: 1989
- Headquarters: Roberto Cano, 2. 1º 52001; Melilla
- Ideology: Monarchism; Economic liberalism Christian democracy
- Political position: Centre-right
- National affiliation: People's Party
- Assembly of Melilla: 14 / 25
- Congress of Deputies (Melilla seats): 1 / 1
- Senate (Melilla seats): 2 / 2

Website
- www.ppmelilla.es

The People's Party of Melilla (Spanish: Partido Popular de Melilla, PP) is the regional section of the People's Party of Spain (PP) in Melilla. It was formed in 1989 from the re-foundation of the People's Alliance.
