= Populars in Freedom Party =

Populars in Freedom Party Partido Populares en Libertad
- President: Ignacio Velázquez Rivera
- Founded: 26 March 2011
- Headquarters: C/Carlos V, 21, 52006, Melilla
- Ideology: Liberalism; Christian humanism Social conservatism Reformism
- Political position: Centre to centre-right

Website
- www.popularesenlibertad.es

The Populars in Freedom Party (Spanish: Partido Populares en Libertad, PPL) was a political party in the Spanish city of Melilla. The party was created in March 2011 by former Mayor-President of Melilla Ignacio Velázquez Rivera as a split from the People's Party (PP). In November 2016, the party was dissolved and merged back into the PP.
