= Mustafa Aberchán =

Spanish politician from Melilla

Mustafa Hamed Mohamed ⵎⵓⵙⵜⴰⴼⴰ ⵃⴰⵎⵉⴷ ⵎⵓⵃⵎⵎⴷ

Mayor-President of Melilla
- In office 5 July 1999 – 19 July 2000
- Preceded by: Enrique Palacios Hernández
- Succeeded by: Juan José Imbroda

Personal details
- Born: 17 October 1959 (age 66) Melilla, Spain
- Party: Coalition for Melilla

Mustafa Hamed Mohamed (October 17, 1959) is a Spanish politician who served as the Mayor-President of Melilla from 5 July 1999 to 19 July 2000, and is the leader of Coalition for Melilla. Aberchán was convicted of vote buying by the Supreme Court of Spain in 2021, and was arrested for vote buying in 2024.

== Career ==
Coalition for Melilla (CPM) was formed when members of the Spanish Socialist Workers' Party (PSOE) left in 1995. Aberchán is the leader of CPM. On 3 July 1999 he became Mayor-President of Melilla with the support of PSOE and the Independent Liberal Group. He was the first Muslim to hold the position and served until a vote of no confidence on 19 July 2000. He funds a charity in the Gaza Strip and attempted to visit it in 2012 and 2013, but was prevented from doing so by Israel. CPM became a coalition partner in the government after the 2019 election.

The Supreme Court of Spain sentenced Aberchán to two years in prison in 2021, for participating in a vote buying scheme during the 2008 election and he was also barred from running for office for two and a half years.

Attorney General Álvaro García Ortiz ordered the Anti-Corruption Office in 2023 to investigate allegations of vote buying in Melilla by CPM. Votes were being bought for €100-150. Mohamed Ahmed Al-lal, a former minister and third on the CPM's electoral list, was arrested alongside 9 other people. Felipe Heredia Núñez, the former president of CD Huracán Melilla, allegedly said that he bought more than 500 votes for CPM. Aberchán was arrested alongside five other people on 5 March 2024. The CPM's vote total fell from 10,472 in 2019, to 5,557 in the 2023 election.

== Works cited ==
- Canales, Pedro (22 July 2000). "Un musulmán gobernará la ciudad autónoma de Melilla con apoyo socialista y del GIL". El País. Archived from the original on 26 May 2019.
- Cembrero, Ignacio (3 July 2013). "Un musulmán gobernará la ciudad autónoma de Melilla con apoyo socialista y del GIL". El País. Archived from the original on 17 June 2025.
- Gálvez, J. (26 May 2023). "La Fiscalía atribuye la compra de votos a una "estructura organizada" de "afines" a Coalición por Melilla". El País. Archived from the original on 26 May 2023.
- Lopez-Fonseca, Oscar (6 March 2024). "La trama de compra de votos en Melilla amañó contratos públicos para "corromper" dos elecciones". El País. Archived from the original on 8 March 2025.
- Lopez-Fonseca, Oscar; Martinez, Virginia (5 March 2024). "Detenido el líder de Coalición por Melilla por compra de votos y fraude en contratos públicos". El País. Archived from the original on 17 June 2025.
- Martinez, Virginia (26 May 2023). "Coalición por Melilla se prepara para impugnar las elecciones en la ciudad autónoma". El País. Archived from the original on 30 May 2023.
- Ramos, Toñy (4 July 1999). "Un musulmán gobernará la ciudad autónoma de Melilla con apoyo socialista y del GIL". El País. Archived from the original on 17 June 2025.
- Ramos, Toñy; Cué, Carlos (6 July 1999). "Coalición por Melilla, un partido de mayoría musulmana y moderado en sus reivindicaciones". El País. Archived from the original on 17 June 2025.
