= Coalition for Melilla =

Coalition for Melilla Coalición por Melilla
- President: Mustafa Aberchán
- Founded: 2 October 1995
- Split from: Spanish Socialist Workers' Party
- Headquarters: Melilla
- Ideology: Social democracy Progressivism; Regionalism; Muslim and Berber rights
- Political position: Centre-left
- National affiliation: United Left (2008–2013)
- Assembly of Melilla: 5 / 25

Website
- www.coalicionpormelilla.es

Coalition for Melilla (Spanish: Coalición por Melilla, CpM) is a political party in the Spanish city of Melilla.

== History ==
The party was formed shortly before the 1995 municipal regional elections of Melilla, as a split from the Spanish Socialist Workers' Party (PSOE) which had previously a strong electoral implantation among Muslim voters. At the 1995 municipal elections, CpM won five seats, as many as the PSOE, and the People's Party (PP) won 14. Three years later, in August 1998, there was a split in the PP and a new municipal executive was formed against the PP, including the CPM, with its leader Mustafa Aberchán entering it with the Environment portfolio.

In 1999, Mustafa Aberchán, running on the Coalition ticket, became the first Muslim mayor of Melilla with PSOE and Independent Liberal Group (GIL) backing. At the 2007 elections for Melilla Assembly, the party came second (5 seats) after PP (15 seats). CpM was federated on national level with United Left from 2008 to 2013.

== Electoral results ==
=== Melilla Assembly ===
Melilla Assembly
Election	Vote	%	Score	Seats	+/–	Leader	Status in legislature
1995	4,072	15.47	New	4 / 25	New		Opposition
1999	5,833	20.44	2nd	5 / 25	1	Mustafa Aberchán	Government (1999–2000)
1999	5,833	20.44	2nd	5 / 25	1	Mustafa Aberchán	Opposition (2000–2003)
2003	7,392	26.33	2nd	7 / 25	2	Mustafa Aberchán	Opposition
2007	6,245	21.71	2nd	5 / 25	2	Mustafa Aberchán	Opposition
2011	7,394	23.66	2nd	6 / 25	1	Mustafa Aberchán	Opposition
2015	8,450	26.41	2nd	7 / 25	1	Mustafa Aberchán	Opposition
2019	10,472	30.62	2nd	8 / 25	1	Mustafa Aberchán	Government
2023	5,557	18.82	2nd	5 / 25	3	Dunia Almansouri	Opposition

=== Cortes Generales ===
Cortes Generales
Election	Congress					Senate		Leader	Status
Election	Vote	%	Score	Seats	+/–	Seats	+/–	Leader	Status
2019 (Apr)	6,857	0.03	31st	0 / 350	0	0 / 208	0	Mustafa Aberchán	No seats
2019 (Nov)	8,955	0.04	27th	0 / 350	0	0 / 208	0	Mustafa Aberchán	No seats
2023	1,298	0.01	40th	0 / 350	0	0 / 208	0	Mustafa Aberchán	No seats

== Sources ==
- Shireen Hunter. Islam, Europe's second religion: the new social, cultural, and political landscape. Greenwood Publishing Group, 2002. ISBN 0-275-97608-4, ISBN 978-0-275-97608-8. Pg 173
