= Assembly of Melilla =

Legislative assembly of the Spanish autonomous city

Assembly of Melilla Asamblea de Melilla
- Melilla unicameral legislature

Type
- Type: Spanish regional legislature
- Houses: Unicameral

History
- New session started: 7 July 2023

Leadership
- President of Melilla: Juan José Imbroda, PP since 7 July 2023

Structure
- Seats: 25
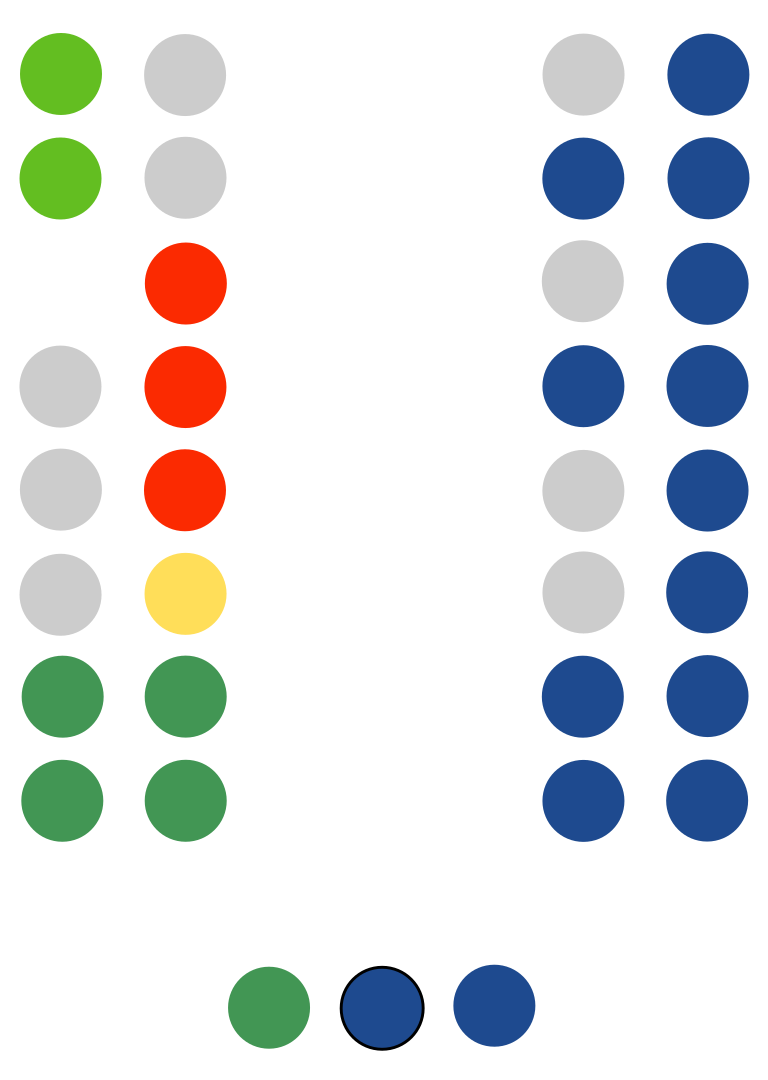
- Political groups: Government (14): PP (14); Opposition (11): CPM (5); PSOE (3); Vox (2); SML (1)
- Length of term: 4 years

Elections
- Last election: 7 July 2023

The Assembly of Melilla (Spanish: Asamblea de Melilla) is the representative institution of the autonomous city of Melilla, an exclave of Spain located on the north coast of Africa. As autonomous cities lack legislative powers, which are reserved only to the Cortes Generales and the legislatures of the autonomous communities, the Assembly of Melilla is more akin to a city council with increased prerogatives, including the right to table bills and to demand the introduction of government bills, than to a legislature.

The Assembly has 25 members, elected by universal suffrage. Following an election, the members of the Assembly select a Mayor-President to serve as the head of government for the city. In the 2015 Melilla Assembly election, the People's Party (PP) fell one seat short of a majority, with 12 out of 25 available seats, requiring support from the sole Populars in Freedom Party (PPL) member to continue governing. In the 2019 Melilla Assembly election, the PP fell three seats short of a majority; an alternative majority was formed headed by the sole member from Citizens (Cs) and supported by the eight members from Coalition for Melilla (CPM) and the fours members from the Spanish Socialist Workers' Party (PSOE).
