= Juan José Imbroda =

Spanish politician

The Most Excellent Juan José Imbroda Ortiz
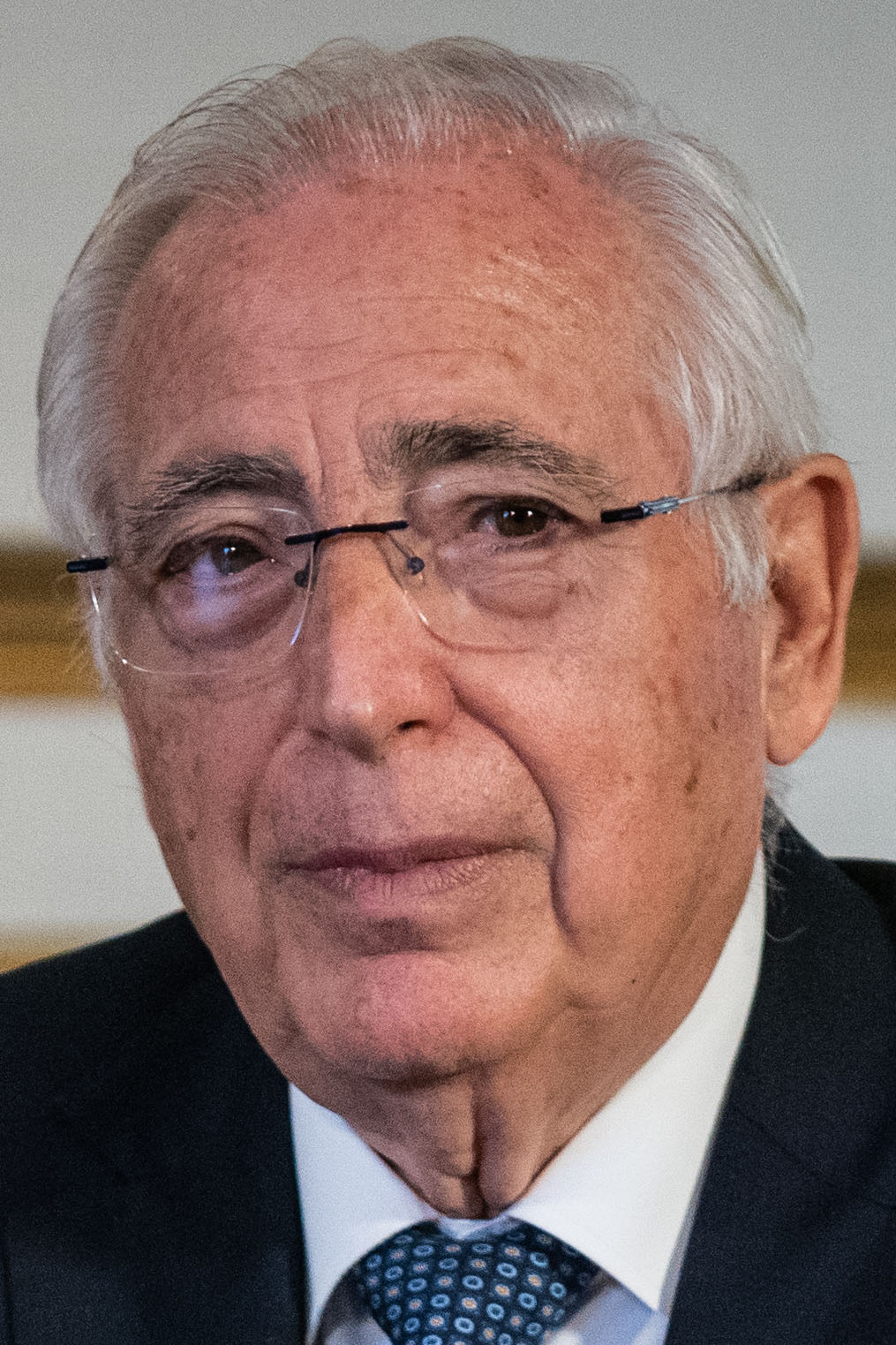
- Imbroda in 2024

Mayor-President of Melilla
- Incumbent
- Assumed office 7 July 2023
- Preceded by: Eduardo de Castro
- In office 20 July 2000 – 15 June 2019
- Preceded by: Mustafa Aberchán
- Succeeded by: Eduardo de Castro

Member of the Senate
- In office 12 March 2000 – 23 July 2023
- Constituency: Melilla

Member of the Assembly of Melilla
- Incumbent
- Assumed office 7 July 2023
- In office 24 May 1995 – 15 June 2019

Member of the Melilla City Council
- In office 15 June 1979 – 23 June 1995

Personal details
- Born: 24 June 1944 (age 82) Melilla, Spain
- Party: PP (2003–present)
- Other political affiliations: UCD (1977–1982); UPM (1985–2003)
- Spouse: Francisca Conde Ramírez
- Children: 3
- Relatives: Javier Imbroda (brother)
- Occupation: Commercial lawyer • Politician

Juan José Imbroda Ortiz (born 24 June 1944) is a Spanish politician who currently serves as the Mayor-President of the exclave of Melilla. He previously served as Mayor-President from 2000 to 2019. He is a member of the People's Party (PP).
