= Sub-national opinion polling for the 2015 Spanish general election =

Sub-national opinion polling for the 2015 Spanish general election may refer to:

- Regional opinion polling for the 2015 Spanish general election
- Constituency opinion polling for the 2015 Spanish general election
