= Constituency opinion polling for the 2015 Spanish general election =

In the run up to the 2015 Spanish general election, various organisations carried out opinion polling to gauge voting intention in constituencies in Spain during the term of the 10th Cortes Generales. Results of such polls are displayed in this article. The date range for these opinion polls is from the previous general election, held on 20 November 2011, to the day the next election was held, on 20 December 2015.

Voting intention estimates refer mainly to a hypothetical Congress of Deputies election. Polls are listed in reverse chronological order, showing the most recent first and using the dates when the survey fieldwork was done, as opposed to the date of publication. Where the fieldwork dates are unknown, the date of publication is given instead. The highest percentage figure in each polling survey is displayed with its background shaded in the leading party's colour. If a tie ensues, this is applied to the figures with the highest percentages. The "Lead" columns on the right shows the percentage-point difference between the parties with the highest percentages in a given poll.

Refusals are generally excluded from the party vote percentages, while question wording and the treatment of "don't know" responses and those not intending to vote may vary between polling organisations. When available, seat projections are displayed below the percentages in a smaller font.

== Constituencies ==
=== A Coruña ===
Polling firm/Commissioner	Fieldwork date	Sample size	Turnout	PP	PSdeG–PSOE	Nós	IU–UPeC	UPYD	AGE	Podemos	C's	En Marea	Lead
2015 general election	20 Dec 2015	—N/a	62.7	35.5; 3	20.4; 2	4.5; 0	(Note: Within En Marea.)	0.5; 0			9.9; 1	26.3; 2	9.2
GIPEyOP	27 Nov–14 Dec 2015	220	?	35.9; 3	11.8; 1	8.2; 0		–			14.2; 1	27.1; 3	8.8
GAD3/ABC	16 Nov–11 Dec 2015	?	?	? 3/4	? 2	? 0		–			? 1	? 1/2	?
Sondaxe/La Voz de Galicia	1–9 Dec 2015	500	?	37.3; 4	16.4; 1	? 0		–			17.3; 1	22.2; 2	15.1
Sigma Dos/El Mundo	1–9 Dec 2015	?	?	37.0; 3	20.0; 2	3.0; 0		–			16.0; 1	20.0; 2	17.0
Redondo & Asociados	1–9 Dec 2015	?	?	38.9; 4	19.7; 2	? 0		–			15.7; 1	19.1; 1	19.2
Redondo & Asociados	25 Nov–1 Dec 2015	?	?	35.9; 3	21.5; 2	? 0		–			19.4; 2	13.2; 1	14.4
CIS	27 Oct–16 Nov 2015	409	?	? 3	? 2	? 0		–			? 1	? 2	?
2014 EP election	25 May 2014	—N/a	38.3	32.3 (4)	21.2 (2)	7.9 (0)	(Note: Within AGE.)	3.8 (0)	11.6 (1)	9.3 (1)	1.9 (0)	–	11.1
2012 regional election	21 Oct 2012	—N/a	54.5	45.4 (4)	18.8 (2)	9.6 (1)		1.8 (0)	16.6 (1)	–	–	–	26.6
2011 general election	20 Nov 2011	—N/a	62.4	51.5; 5	27.3; 2	11.7; 1	4.6; 0	1.3; 0	–	–	–	–	24.2

=== Álava ===
Polling firm/Commissioner	Fieldwork date	Sample size	Turnout	PP	PSE–EE	Amaiur EH Bildu	PNV	IU–UPeC	UPYD	Podemos	C's	Lead
2015 general election	20 Dec 2015	—N/a	71.1	18.8; 1	14.1; 1	11.8; 0	15.8; 1	3.8; 0	0.4; 0	27.0; 1	5.9; 0	8.2
GIPEyOP	27 Nov–14 Dec 2015	33	?	15.8; 1	15.4; 1	18.5; 1	18.6; 1	3.8; 0	–	6.9; 0	13.6; 0	0.1
GAD3/ABC	16 Nov–11 Dec 2015	?	?	? 1	? 0	? 1	? 1	–	–	? 1	? 0	Tie
Sigma Dos/El Mundo	1–9 Dec 2015	?	?	23.0; 1	15.0; 1	12.0; 0	15.0; 1	–	–	17.0; 1	? 0	6.0
Redondo & Asociados	1–9 Dec 2015	?	?	17.7; 1	13.8; 1	15.1; 1	18.7; 1	–	–	? 0	? 0	1.0
Redondo & Asociados	25 Nov–1 Dec 2015	?	?	17.8; 1	16.4; 1	14.3; 1	18.4; 1	–	–	? 0	? 0	0.6
Aztiker/Gara	16–28 Nov 2015	450	?	19.0; 1	12.2; 0	16.9; 1	18.5; 1	2.6; 0	0.6; 0	15.0; 1	11.5; 0	0.5
Gizaker/Grupo Noticias	14–18 Nov 2015	600	?	22.5; 1	10.4; 0	16.5; 1	18.9; 1	–	–	18.6; 1	7.0; 0	3.6
CIS	27 Oct–16 Nov 2015	419	?	? 1	? 0	? 1	? 1	–	–	? 1	? 0	Tie
Ikertalde/GPS	13–19 Oct 2015	560	69.0	20.0; 1	14.0; 0	17.6; 1	18.5; 1	2.5; 0	0.4; 0	17.0; 1	7.5; 0	1.5
2015 foral elections	24 May 2015	—N/a	65.6	22.0 (1)	11.2 (0)	20.4 (1)	21.6 (1)	3.7 (0)	0.7 (0)	14.6 (1)	3.1 (0)	0.4
2014 EP election	25 May 2014	—N/a	42.7	16.0 (1)	15.2 (1)	19.5 (1)	17.2 (1)	6.3 (0)	4.5 (0)	8.9 (0)	1.1 (0)	2.3
2012 regional election	21 Oct 2012	—N/a	63.6	18.7 (1)	19.3 (1)	21.7 (1)	25.5 (1)	2.9 (0)	3.5 (0)	–	–	3.8
2011 general election	20 Nov 2011	—N/a	68.7	27.2; 1	23.4; 1	19.1; 1	18.8; 1	4.1; 0	2.8; 0	–	–	3.8

=== Albacete ===
Polling firm/Commissioner	Fieldwork date	Sample size	Turnout	PP	PSOE	IU–UPeC	UPYD	Podemos	C's	Lead
2015 general election	20 Dec 2015	—N/a	75.3	36.8; 2	28.2; 1	4.0; 0	0.5; 0	14.0; 0	14.6; 1	8.6
GIPEyOP	27 Nov–14 Dec 2015	151	?	29.9; 2	28.9; 1	4.8; 0	–	12.3; 0	19.7; 1	1.0
GAD3/ABC	16 Nov–11 Dec 2015	?	?	? 2	? 1	–	–	? 0	? 1	?
Sigma Dos/El Mundo	1–9 Dec 2015	?	?	34.0; 2	18.0; 1	3.0; 0	–	16.0; 0	26.0; 1	8.0
Redondo & Asociados	1–9 Dec 2015	?	?	36.5; 2	19.6; 1	–	–	? 0	22.0; 1	14.5
Redondo & Asociados	25 Nov–1 Dec 2015	?	?	35.7; 2	22.7; 1	–	–	? 0	21.6; 1	13.0
CIS	27 Oct–16 Nov 2015	252	?	? 2	? 1	–	–	? 0	? 1	?
2015 regional election	24 May 2015	—N/a	70.8	36.7 (2)	33.8 (2)	3.8 (0)	1.0 (0)	11.2 (0)	9.6 (0)	2.9
2014 EP election	25 May 2014	—N/a	46.9	35.6 (2)	28.8 (2)	9.0 (0)	7.5 (0)	7.4 (0)	2.2 (0)	6.8
2011 general election	20 Nov 2011	—N/a	76.1	55.1; 3	30.1; 1	6.2; 0	5.0; 0	–	–	25.0

=== Alicante ===
Polling firm/Commissioner	Fieldwork date	Sample size	Turnout	PP	PSOE	IU–UPeC	UPYD	Compromís	Podemos	C's	És el moment	Lead
2015 general election	20 Dec 2015	—N/a	72.9	32.8; 4	20.8; 3	3.7; 0	0.6; 0	(Note: Within És el moment.)		17.1; 2	22.3; 3	10.5
GIPEyOP	27 Nov–14 Dec 2015	720	?	25.6; 3	20.3; 3	3.8; 0	–			20.0; 3	24.6; 3	1.0
GAD3/ABC	16 Nov–11 Dec 2015	?	?	? 4	? 3	–	–			? 2	? 3	?
Sigma Dos/El Mundo	1–9 Dec 2015	?	?	30.0; 4/5	23.0; 3	6.0; 0	–			22.0; 2/3	16.0; 2	7.0
Redondo & Asociados	1–9 Dec 2015	?	?	29.9; 4	20.4; 3	–	–			25.4; 3	17.5; 2	5.5
Metroscopia/El País	2–3 Dec 2015	400	77	26.7; 3/4	24.5; 3	4.9; 0	–			20.3; 2/3	21.1; 3	2.2
Redondo & Asociados	25 Nov–1 Dec 2015	?	?	30.8; 4	23.1; 3	–	–			24.4; 3	15.7; 2	6.4
ODEC/PSPV	23 Nov 2015	?	?	? 3	? 4	–	–			? 3	? 2	?
CIS	27 Oct–16 Nov 2015	424	?	? 4/5	? 2/3	–	–			? 3	? 2	?
GAD3/ABC	14–29 Oct 2015	?	?	? 4	? 3	–	–	? 0	? 2	? 3	–	?
Metroscopia/El País	5–7 Oct 2015	435	?	? 3	? 3	–	–	? 0	? 2	? 4	–	?
2015 regional election	24 May 2015	—N/a	66.0	27.7 (4)	22.7 (3)	4.4 (0)	1.5 (0)	12.5 (2)	12.2 (1)	14.1 (2)	–	5.0
JM&A/El Mundo	17 May 2015	?	?	28.3; 4	20.6; 3	? 0	? 0	? 0	19.0; 2	21.0; 3	–	7.3
2014 EP election	25 May 2014	—N/a	44.8	30.6 (5)	22.8 (4)	10.0 (1)	8.9 (1)	4.8 (0)	8.9 (1)	3.2 (0)	–	7.8
2011 general election	20 Nov 2011	—N/a	73.5	55.2; 8	27.0; 4	6.5; 0	5.6; 0	3.1; 0	–	–	–	28.2

=== Almería ===
Polling firm/Commissioner	Fieldwork date	Sample size	Turnout	PP	PSOE	IULV	UPYD	Podemos	C's	Lead
2015 general election	20 Dec 2015	—N/a	63.7	38.0; 2	28.9; 2	3.5; 0	0.5; 0	12.8; 1	14.4; 1	9.1
GIPEyOP	27 Nov–14 Dec 2015	83	?	30.6; 2	27.0; 2	3.9; 0	–	17.0; 0	18.3; 1	3.6
Deimos Estadística	9–12 Dec 2015	601	?	33.9; 2/3	19.0; 1	–	–	16.3; 1	24.3; 1/2	9.6
GAD3/ABC	16 Nov–11 Dec 2015	?	?	? 3	? 2	–	–	? 0	? 1	?
Sigma Dos/El Mundo	1–9 Dec 2015	?	?	38.0; 3	24.0; 1	2.0; 0	–	13.0; 1	21.0; 1	14.0
Redondo & Asociados	1–9 Dec 2015	?	?	35.1; 2	25.3; 2	–	–	14.6; 1	19.1; 1	9.8
Deimos Estadística	3–5 Dec 2015	451	?	35.9; 2/3	21.8; 1	3.2; 0	0.7; 0	11.8; 0/1	25.5; 2	10.4
Redondo & Asociados	25 Nov–1 Dec 2015	?	?	36.8; 3	22.2; 1	–	–	14.3; 1	21.1; 1	14.6
Demoscopia Servicios/PP	23–30 Nov 2015	1,200	?	41.3; 3	26.4; 2	3.0; 0	–	13.0; 0	14.9; 1	14.9
CIS	27 Oct–16 Nov 2015	255	?	? 2/3	? 2/3	–	–	? 0	? 1	Tie
GAD3/ABC	19 Oct–12 Nov 2015	?	?	? 3	? 2	–	–	? 0	? 1	?
2015 regional election	22 Mar 2015	—N/a	60.5	36.9 (3)	32.9 (3)	4.2 (0)	1.8 (0)	11.0 (0)	9.4 (0)	4.0
2014 EP election	25 May 2014	—N/a	37.8	35.1 (3)	32.9 (3)	7.6 (0)	6.6 (0)	5.6 (0)	2.4 (0)	2.2
2012 regional election	25 Mar 2012	—N/a	57.0	51.2 (4)	35.4 (2)	7.1 (0)	2.9 (0)	–	–	15.8
2011 general election	20 Nov 2011	—N/a	67.2	57.6; 4	29.9; 2	5.3; 0	3.9; 0	–	–	27.7

=== Ávila ===
Polling firm/Commissioner	Fieldwork date	Sample size	Turnout	PP	PSOE	UPYD	IU–UPeC	Podemos	C's	Lead
2015 general election	20 Dec 2015	—N/a	73.8	46.1; 2	19.9; 1	0.9; 0	3.8; 0	11.7; 0	15.7; 0	26.2
GIPEyOP	27 Nov–14 Dec 2015	20	?	40.0; 1	21.3; 1	–	3.4; 0	12.1; 0	20.2; 1	18.7
GAD3/ABC	16 Nov–11 Dec 2015	?	?	? 2	? 0	–	–	? 0	? 1	?
Sigma Dos/El Mundo	1–9 Dec 2015	?	?	43.0; 2	16.0; 0	–	3.0; 0	10.0; 0	25.0; 1	18.0
Redondo & Asociados	1–9 Dec 2015	?	?	43.8; 2	? 0	–	–	? 0	24.5; 1	19.3
Redondo & Asociados	25 Nov–1 Dec 2015	?	?	43.1; 2	? 0	–	–	? 0	24.2; 1	18.9
CIS	27 Oct–16 Nov 2015	236	?	? 2	? 0	–	–	? 0	? 1	?
2015 regional election	24 May 2015	—N/a	69.8	45.3 (2)	22.1 (1)	2.2 (0)	4.0 (0)	10.1 (0)	11.9 (0)	23.2
2014 EP election	25 May 2014	—N/a	51.4	45.4 (2)	19.2 (1)	8.0 (0)	7.0 (0)	5.1 (0)	2.2 (0)	26.2
2011 general election	20 Nov 2011	—N/a	75.4	61.9; 2	22.9; 1	7.8; 0	4.5; 0	–	–	39.0

=== Badajoz ===
Polling firm/Commissioner	Fieldwork date	Sample size	Turnout	PP	PSOE	IU–UPeC	UPYD	Podemos	C's	Lead
2015 general election	20 Dec 2015	—N/a	72.3	34.5; 2	37.2; 3	3.1; 0	0.4; 0	11.9; 1	11.4; 0	2.7
GIPEyOP	27 Nov–14 Dec 2015	66	?	36.2; 3	32.7; 2	4.5; 0	–	14.8; 1	8.7; 0	3.5
GAD3/ABC	16 Nov–11 Dec 2015	?	?	? 2	? 3	–	–	? 0	? 1	?
Sigma Dos/El Mundo	1–9 Dec 2015	?	?	38.0; 3	27.0; 2	6.0; 0	–	10.0; 0	17.0; 1	11.0
Redondo & Asociados	1–9 Dec 2015	?	?	28.6; 2	31.6; 2	–	–	16.8; 1	17.4; 1	3.0
Redondo & Asociados	25 Nov–1 Dec 2015	?	?	32.0; 2	26.5; 2	–	–	16.9; 1	20.2; 1	5.5
CIS	27 Oct–16 Nov 2015	255	?	? 2	? 3	–	–	? 0	? 1	?
Metroscopia/El País	4 Nov 2015	400	76	31.9; 2	32.5; 2/3	4.5; 0	–	11.4; 0/1	17.2; 1	0.6
2015 regional election	24 May 2015	—N/a	71.3	36.3 (3)	43.7 (3)	4.8 (0)	0.6 (0)	7.3 (0)	3.9 (0)	7.4
2014 EP election	25 May 2014	—N/a	44.1	34.9 (3)	40.1 (3)	6.5 (0)	4.3 (0)	5.7 (0)	0.9 (0)	5.2
2011 general election	20 Nov 2011	—N/a	74.3	50.6; 4	37.6; 2	6.0; 0	3.5; 0	–	–	13.0

=== Barcelona ===
Polling firm/Commissioner	Fieldwork date	Sample size	Turnout	PSC	CiU	PP	ICV–EUiA	ERC–CatSí	UPYD	C's	CUP	Podemos	CDC DiL	unio.cat	En Comú Podem	JxSí	Lead
2015 general election	20 Dec 2015	—N/a	69.6	16.3; 5	–	11.3; 4	(Note: Within ECP.)	14.5; 5	0.2; 0	13.5; 4	–		13.2; 4	1.7; 0	26.9; 9	–	10.6
GIPEyOP	27 Nov–14 Dec 2015	598	?	13.8; 4	–	8.7; 3		19.0; 6	–	19.5; 7	–		17.7; 6	–	16.6; 5	–	0.5
GAD3/ABC	16 Nov–11 Dec 2015	?	?	? 6	–	? 3/4		? 5	–	? 5/6	–		? 4	–	? 7	–	?
Sigma Dos/El Mundo	1–9 Dec 2015	?	?	17.0; 5/6	–	11.0; 3		15.0; 5	–	20.0; 6/7	–		13.0; 4	–	21.0; 7	–	1.0
Redondo & Asociados	1–9 Dec 2015	?	?	19.5; 6	–	13.4; 4		12.1; 4	–	20.3; 7	–		12.1; 4	–	19.3; 6	–	0.8
Redondo & Asociados	25 Nov–1 Dec 2015	?	?	20.1; 7	–	11.7; 4	4.9; 1	12.7; 4	–	19.7; 6	–	15.8; 5	12.7; 4	–	–	–	0.4
Metroscopia/El País	16–17 Nov 2015	600	76	18.5; 6	–	9.5; 3		12.6; 4	–	19.8; 6/7	–		13.1; 4	–	20.7; 7/8	–	0.9
CIS	27 Oct–16 Nov 2015	817	?	? 5/6	–	? 3		? 4	–	? 6	–		? 4	–	? 8/9	–	?
GAD3/ABC	14 Oct–4 Nov 2015	?	?	? 4	–	? 4	? 1	? 6	–	? 6	–	? 4	? 5	? 1	–	–	Tie
2015 regional election	27 Sep 2015	—N/a	75.0	13.7 (4)	–	8.8 (3)	(Note: Within CatSíqueesPot.)	(Note: Within JxSí.)	–	18.8 (6)	8.3 (2)			2.5 (0)	10.1 (3)	36.1 (13)	17.3
2014 EP election	25 May 2014	—N/a	46.7	15.2 (5)	19.8 (7)	10.1 (3)	11.3 (4)	21.9 (8)	1.4 (0)	6.9 (2)	–	5.2 (2)	(Note: Within CiU.)		–	–	2.1
Feedback/La Vanguardia	30 Apr–8 May 2014	?	?	? 7	? 8	? 6	? 4	? 4	–	? 2	–	–			–	–	?
Feedback/La Vanguardia	2–6 Sep 2013	?	?	? 8	? 7	? 5	? 5	? 4	? 2	–	–	–			–	–	?
2012 regional election	25 Nov 2012	—N/a	68.0	15.4 (5)	28.1 (10)	13.3 (4)	11.1 (4)	12.7 (4)	0.4 (0)	8.4 (3)	3.4 (1)	–			–	–	12.7
Feedback/La Vanguardia	21–27 Sep 2012	?	?	? 6	? 12	? 6	? 5	? 2	–	–	–	–			–	–	?
2011 general election	20 Nov 2011	—N/a	65.9	27.8; 10	27.2; 9	20.9; 7	9.1; 3	6.5; 2	1.3; 0	–	–	–			–	–	0.6

=== Biscay ===
Polling firm/Commissioner	Fieldwork date	Sample size	Turnout	PNV	PSE–EE	Amaiur EH Bildu	PP	IU–UPeC	UPYD	Podemos	C's	Lead
2015 general election	20 Dec 2015	—N/a	69.4	27.9; 3	13.0; 1	12.5; 1	11.4; 1	2.8; 0	0.3; 0	26.1; 2	3.8; 0	1.8
GIPEyOP	27 Nov–14 Dec 2015	122	?	26.8; 2	18.2; 2	16.6; 1	10.4; 1	3.6; 0	–	18.0; 2	5.8; 0	8.6
GAD3/ABC	16 Nov–11 Dec 2015	?	?	? 3	? 1	? 1	? 1	–	–	? 2	? 0	?
Sigma Dos/El Mundo	1–9 Dec 2015	?	?	27.0; 3	14.0; 1	14.0; 1	12.0; 1	–	–	23.0; 2	? 0	4.0
Redondo & Asociados	1–9 Dec 2015	?	?	29.8; 3	12.3; 1	15.2; 1	12.0; 1	–	–	12.8; 1	9.1; 1	14.6
Redondo & Asociados	25 Nov–1 Dec 2015	?	?	29.4; 3	14.7; 1	14.5; 1	12.1; 1	–	–	12.0; 1	9.2; 1	14.7
Aztiker/Gara	16–28 Nov 2015	600	?	30.4; 3	14.3; 1	16.0; 1	10.7; 1	2.5; 0	0.3; 0	16.2; 2	7.5; 0	14.2
Gizaker/Grupo Noticias	14–18 Nov 2015	600	?	35.0; 3	12.9; 1	16.5; 1	8.7; 1	–	–	20.0; 2	? 0	15.0
CIS	27 Oct–16 Nov 2015	448	?	? 2	? 1	? 2	? 1	–	–	? 2	? 0	Tie
Ikertalde/GPS	13–19 Oct 2015	1,260	69.0	30.6; 3	14.0; 1	16.3; 1	12.0; 1	2.3; 0	0.3; 0	18.0; 2	4.5; 0	12.6
2015 foral elections	24 May 2015	—N/a	62.6	37.6 (4)	12.5 (1)	18.9 (2)	8.2 (0)	2.6 (0)	0.6 (0)	14.5 (1)	2.1 (0)	18.7
2014 EP election	25 May 2014	—N/a	44.3	31.8 (4)	13.6 (1)	19.9 (2)	10.0 (1)	5.7 (0)	3.2 (0)	6.7 (2)	0.8 (0)	11.9
2012 regional election	21 Oct 2012	—N/a	64.5	37.9 (4)	18.7 (1)	21.2 (2)	11.7 (1)	2.7 (0)	1.8 (0)	–	–	16.7
2011 general election	20 Nov 2011	—N/a	68.1	32.6; 3	21.4; 2	19.2; 2	17.7; 1	3.8; 0	1.7; 0	–	–	11.2

=== Burgos ===
Polling firm/Commissioner	Fieldwork date	Sample size	Turnout	PP	PSOE	UPYD	IU–UPeC	Podemos	C's	Lead
2015 general election	20 Dec 2015	—N/a	72.4	38.0; 2	20.7; 1	1.1; 0	4.7; 0	17.1; 1	15.6; 0	17.3
GIPEyOP	27 Nov–14 Dec 2015	46	?	32.9; 1	24.3; 1	–	4.6; 0	17.3; 1	16.9; 1	8.6
GAD3/ABC	16 Nov–11 Dec 2015	?	?	? 2	? 1	–	–	? 0	? 1	?
Sigma Dos/El Mundo	1–9 Dec 2015	?	?	38.0; 2	17.0; 0/1	–	4.0; 0	18.0; 0/1	20.0; 1	18.0
Redondo & Asociados	1–9 Dec 2015	?	?	38.2; 2	17.3; 1	–	–	? 0	23.4; 1	14.8
Redondo & Asociados	25 Nov–1 Dec 2015	?	?	37.6; 2	20.2; 1	–	–	? 0	23.1; 1	14.5
Metroscopia/El País	28–29 Nov 2015	400	77	34.1; 2	19.3; 1	–	4.2; 0	13.7; 0	19.1; 1	14.8
CIS	27 Oct–16 Nov 2015	254	?	? 2	? 1	–	–	? 0	? 1	?
2015 regional election	24 May 2015	—N/a	63.7	36.5 (2)	24.7 (1)	1.8 (0)	3.9 (0)	14.2 (1)	12.1 (0)	11.8
2014 EP election	25 May 2014	—N/a	47.4	36.8 (3)	20.2 (1)	9.1 (0)	8.3 (0)	9.7 (0)	2.5 (0)	16.6
2011 general election	20 Nov 2011	—N/a	71.7	54.2; 3	28.0; 1	7.5; 0	5.6; 0	–	–	26.2

=== Cáceres ===
Polling firm/Commissioner	Fieldwork date	Sample size	Turnout	PP	PSOE	IU–UPeC	UPYD	Podemos	C's	Lead
2015 general election	20 Dec 2015	—N/a	71.9	35.3; 2	34.0; 2	2.9; 0	0.4; 0	13.9; 0	11.4; 0	1.3
GIPEyOP	27 Nov–14 Dec 2015	53	?	35.8; 2	32.7; 2	4.1; 0	–	12.4; 0	13.0; 0	3.1
GAD3/ABC	16 Nov–11 Dec 2015	?	?	? 2	? 2	–	–	? 0	? 0	Tie
Sigma Dos/El Mundo	1–9 Dec 2015	?	?	37.0; 2	32.0; 2	3.0; 0	–	12.0; 0	15.0; 0	5.0
Redondo & Asociados	1–9 Dec 2015	?	?	32.6; 2	31.2; 2	–	–	? 0	? 0	1.4
Redondo & Asociados	25 Nov–1 Dec 2015	?	?	33.0; 2	26.2; 1	–	–	? 0	20.5; 1	6.8
CIS	27 Oct–16 Nov 2015	255	?	? 2	? 2	–	–	? 0	? 0	Tie
2015 regional election	24 May 2015	—N/a	71.6	38.2 (2)	38.0 (2)	3.4 (0)	0.6 (0)	9.2 (0)	5.1 (0)	0.2
2014 EP election	25 May 2014	—N/a	44.8	36.6 (2)	36.5 (2)	6.0 (0)	5.1 (0)	5.6 (0)	1.1 (0)	0.1
2011 general election	20 Nov 2011	—N/a	73.3	52.0; 2	36.5; 2	6.0; 0	3.5; 0	–	–	15.5

=== Cádiz ===
Polling firm/Commissioner	Fieldwork date	Sample size	Turnout	PP	PSOE	IULV	UPYD	Podemos	C's	Lead
2015 general election	20 Dec 2015	—N/a	65.7	27.7; 3	28.0; 3	6.0; 0	0.6; 0	20.2; 2	14.7; 1	0.3
GIPEyOP	27 Nov–14 Dec 2015	141	?	21.1; 2	25.8; 3	5.2; 0	–	23.4; 2	19.7; 2	2.4
GAD3/ABC	16 Nov–11 Dec 2015	?	?	? 3	? 3	–	–	? 1	? 2	Tie
Sigma Dos/El Mundo	1–9 Dec 2015	?	?	26.0; 2/3	27.0; 2/3	5.0; 0	–	18.0; 2	22.0; 2	1.0
Redondo & Asociados	1–9 Dec 2015	?	?	26.0; 3	29.3; 3	–	–	18.0; 2	17.0; 1	3.3
Redondo & Asociados	25 Nov–1 Dec 2015	?	?	28.1; 3	25.0; 2	–	–	18.2; 2	19.1; 2	3.1
CIS	27 Oct–16 Nov 2015	355	?	? 3	? 3	–	–	? 1	? 2	Tie
GAD3/ABC	19 Oct–12 Nov 2015	?	?	? 3	? 3	–	–	? 2	? 1	Tie
2015 regional election	22 Mar 2015	—N/a	57.7	24.0 (2)	31.6 (3)	6.7 (0)	2.1 (0)	18.9 (2)	10.4 (1)	7.6
2014 EP election	25 May 2014	—N/a	36.8	23.7 (3)	30.9 (3)	12.1 (1)	7.5 (0)	10.7 (1)	1.8 (0)	7.2
2012 regional election	25 Mar 2012	—N/a	53.2	40.5 (4)	35.6 (3)	12.7 (1)	3.3 (0)	–	–	4.9
2011 general election	20 Nov 2011	—N/a	63.8	47.1; 5	32.8; 3	8.7; 0	4.8; 0	–	–	14.3

=== Castellón ===
Polling firm/Commissioner	Fieldwork date	Sample size	Turnout	PP	PSOE	IU–UPeC	UPYD	Compromís	Podemos	C's	És el moment	Lead
2015 general election	20 Dec 2015	—N/a	75.0	31.8; 2	21.5; 1	3.1; 0	0.6; 0			15.6; 1	24.1; 1	7.7
GIPEyOP	27 Nov–14 Dec 2015	440	?	27.8; 2	21.0; 1	5.6; 0	–			16.7; 1	23.6; 1	4.2
GAD3/ABC	16 Nov–11 Dec 2015	?	?	? 2	? 1	–	–			? 1	? 1	?
Sigma Dos/El Mundo	1–9 Dec 2015	?	?	29.0; 2	23.0; 1	3.0; 0	–			22.0; 1	21.0; 1	7.0
Redondo & Asociados	1–9 Dec 2015	?	?	29.0; 2	22.1; 1	–	–			24.1; 1	17.8; 1	4.9
Redondo & Asociados	25 Nov–1 Dec 2015	?	?	29.5; 2	25.2; 1	–	–			23.3; 1	16.0; 1	4.3
ODEC/PSPV	23 Nov 2015	?	?	? 2	? 1	–	–			? 1	? 1	?
CIS	27 Oct–16 Nov 2015	283	?	? 2	? 1	–	–			? 1	? 1	?
GAD3/ABC	14–29 Oct 2015	?	?	? 2	? 2	–	–	? 0	? 0	? 1	–	Tie
Metroscopia/El País	5–7 Oct 2015	330	?	? 1	? 1/2	–	–	? 0	? 1	? 1/2	–	Tie
2015 regional election	24 May 2015	—N/a	71.1	29.5 (2)	24.0 (2)	3.2 (0)	0.8 (0)	14.3 (1)	11.6 (0)	11.1 (0)	–	5.5
JM&A/El Mundo	17 May 2015	?	?	26.6; 2	22.2; 1	? 0	? 0	? 0	17.4; 1	21.4; 1	–	4.4
2014 EP election	25 May 2014	—N/a	49.2	32.0 (3)	22.9 (2)	8.7 (1)	7.2 (1)	6.3 (0)	7.8 (1)	3.1 (0)	–	9.1
2011 general election	20 Nov 2011	—N/a	72.7	52.8; 3	29.6; 2	5.3; 0	4.0; 0	4.0; 0	–	–	–	23.2

=== Ceuta ===
Color key:

Exit poll

Polling firm/Commissioner	Fieldwork date	Sample size	Turnout	PP	PSOE	Caballas	UPYD	IU–UPeC	Podemos	C's	Lead
2015 general election	20 Dec 2015	—N/a	54.4	44.9; 1	23.1; 0	–	0.6; 0	1.3; 0	14.1; 0	13.3; 0	21.8
TNS Demoscopia/RTVE–FORTA	20 Dec 2015	?	?	39.7; 1	17.5; 0	–	1.8; 0	3.6; 0	9.2; 0	20.2; 0	19.5
GIPEyOP	27 Nov–14 Dec 2015	6	?	45.3; 1	13.7; 0	–	–	–	8.2; 0	18.0; 0	27.3
GAD3/ABC	16 Nov–11 Dec 2015	?	?	? 1	? 0	–	–	–	? 0	? 0	?
Redondo & Asociados	1–9 Dec 2015	?	?	45.2; 1	? 0	–	–	–	? 0	? 0	?
GAD3/ABC	10 Nov–3 Dec 2015	?	?	? 1	? 0	–	–	–	? 0	? 0	?
Redondo & Asociados	25 Nov–1 Dec 2015	?	?	44.2; 1	? 0	–	–	–	? 0	? 0	?
CIS	27 Oct–16 Nov 2015	200	?	? 1	? 0	–	–	–	? 0	? 0	?
2015 Assembly election	24 May 2015	—N/a	48.0	45.7; 1	14.0; 0	13.3; 0	1.1; 0	1.6; 0	–	6.0; 0	31.7
2014 EP election	25 May 2014	—N/a	25.9	40.3; 1	22.5; 0	9.0; 0	6.8; 0	3.4; 0	3.7; 0	2.4; 0	17.8
Metroscopia/El País	30 Nov 2013	?	?	? 1	? 0	–	–	–	–	–	?
NC Report/La Razón	1–17 Feb 2012	125	?	? 1	? 0	–	–	–	–	–	?
2011 general election	20 Nov 2011	—N/a	53.2	65.9; 1	20.3; 0	5.4; 0	3.3; 0	1.8; 0	–	–	45.6

=== Ciudad Real ===
Polling firm/Commissioner	Fieldwork date	Sample size	Turnout	PP	PSOE	IU–UPeC	UPYD	Podemos	C's	Lead
2015 general election	20 Dec 2015	—N/a	75.3	38.4; 3	31.1; 2	3.3; 0	0.5; 0	12.5; 0	12.3; 0	7.3
GIPEyOP	27 Nov–14 Dec 2015	78	?	35.4; 2	33.7; 2	3.3; 0	–	12.2; 0	12.4; 1	1.7
GAD3/ABC	16 Nov–11 Dec 2015	?	?	? 3	? 1	–	–	? 0	? 1	?
Sigma Dos/El Mundo	1–9 Dec 2015	?	?	37.0; 2	25.0; 1	3.0; 0	–	15.0; 1	17.0; 1	12.0
Redondo & Asociados	1–9 Dec 2015	?	?	36.7; 2	20.6; 1	–	–	16.4; 1	21.9; 1	14.8
Redondo & Asociados	25 Nov–1 Dec 2015	?	?	35.9; 2	23.8; 1	–	–	15.0; 1	21.5; 1	12.1
CIS	27 Oct–16 Nov 2015	252	?	? 2/3	? 1/2	–	–	? 0	? 1	?
2015 regional election	24 May 2015	—N/a	70.4	37.1 (2)	38.8 (3)	3.1 (0)	1.1 (0)	8.4 (0)	7.5 (0)	1.7
2014 EP election	25 May 2014	—N/a	45.3	37.8 (3)	31.5 (2)	8.6 (0)	7.2 (0)	5.0 (0)	1.9 (0)	6.3
2011 general election	20 Nov 2011	—N/a	74.8	55.2; 3	32.0; 2	5.4; 0	4.4; 0	–	–	23.2

=== Gipuzkoa ===
Polling firm/Commissioner	Fieldwork date	Sample size	Turnout	Amaiur EH Bildu	PNV	PSE–EE	PP	IU–UPeC	UPYD	Podemos	C's	Lead
2015 general election	20 Dec 2015	—N/a	67.4	20.9; 1	23.5; 2	13.3; 1	8.7; 0	2.8; 0	0.3; 0	25.3; 2	3.8; 0	1.8
GIPEyOP	27 Nov–14 Dec 2015	94	?	27.4; 2	23.0; 2	12.9; 1	6.4; 0	3.7; 0	–	17.4; 1	5.7; 0	4.4
GAD3/ABC	16 Nov–11 Dec 2015	?	?	? 2	? 2	? 1	? 0	–	–	? 1	? 0	Tie
Sigma Dos/El Mundo	1–9 Dec 2015	?	?	26.0; 2	21.0; 1	13.0; 1	7.0; 0	–	–	22.0; 2	? 0	4.0
Redondo & Asociados	1–9 Dec 2015	?	?	27.3; 2	25.0; 2	10.9; 1	? 0	–	–	11.0; 1	? 0	2.3
Redondo & Asociados	25 Nov–1 Dec 2015	?	?	26.2; 2	20.9; 2	13.7; 1	? 0	–	–	10.9; 1	? 0	5.3
Aztiker/Gara	16–28 Nov 2015	600	?	25.0; 2	26.4; 2	14.5; 1	4.2; 0	4.4; 0	–	15.2; 1	7.7; 0	1.4
Gizaker/Grupo Noticias	14–18 Nov 2015	600	?	28.2; 2	28.5; 2	15.0; 1	5.6; 0	–	–	18.1; 2	? 0	0.3
CIS	27 Oct–16 Nov 2015	416	?	? 2/3	? 2	? 0/1	? 0	–	–	? 1	? 0	?
Ikertalde/GPS	13–19 Oct 2015	700	67.5	26.7; 2	26.1; 2	16.0; 1	6.5; 0	2.0; 0	0.2; 0	17.5; 1	3.0; 0	0.6
2015 foral elections	24 May 2015	—N/a	64.9	28.8 (2)	31.6 (2)	16.5 (1)	5.4 (0)	2.4 (0)	0.3 (0)	12.1 (1)	1.5 (0)	2.8
2014 EP election	25 May 2014	—N/a	41.4	31.1 (3)	24.5 (2)	13.7 (1)	7.9 (0)	5.0 (0)	3.0 (0)	6.4 (0)	0.7 (0)	6.6
2012 regional election	21 Oct 2012	—N/a	63.3	31.8 (3)	31.6 (2)	19.0 (1)	8.4 (0)	2.7 (0)	1.4 (0)	–	–	0.2
2011 general election	20 Nov 2011	—N/a	65.5	34.8; 3	22.4; 1	21.0; 1	13.7; 1	3.4; 0	1.5; 0	–	–	12.4

=== Girona ===
Polling firm/Commissioner	Fieldwork date	Sample size	Turnout	CiU	PSC	PP	ERC–CatSí	ICV–EUiA	C's	CUP	Podemos	CDC DiL	unio.cat	En Comú Podem	JxSí	Lead
2015 general election	20 Dec 2015	—N/a	65.6	–	12.7; 1	8.5; 0	23.5; 2		9.8; 0	–		25.0; 2	1.8; 0	16.3; 1	–	1.5
GIPEyOP	27 Nov–14 Dec 2015	45	?	–	10.2; 0	7.0; 0	35.9; 3		12.0; 1	–		18.6; 1	3.4; 0	10.5; 1	–	17.3
GAD3/ABC	16 Nov–11 Dec 2015	?	?	–	? 1	? 0	? 1		? 1	–		? 2	–	? 1	–	?
Sigma Dos/El Mundo	1–9 Dec 2015	?	?	–	13.0; 1	7.0; 0	25.0; 2		8.0; 0	–		29.0; 2	–	15.0; 1	–	4.0
Redondo & Asociados	1–9 Dec 2015	?	?	–	16.0; 1	? 0	21.8; 2		16.8; 1	–		17.7; 1	–	14.5; 1	–	4.1
Redondo & Asociados	25 Nov–1 Dec 2015	?	?	–	16.5; 1	? 0	22.8; 2	? 0	16.2; 1	–	11.8; 1	18.6; 1	–	–	–	4.2
CIS	27 Oct–16 Nov 2015	426	?	–	? 1	? 0	? 1		? 1	–		? 2	–	? 1	–	?
GAD3/ABC	14 Oct–4 Nov 2015	?	?	–	? 1	? 1	? 2	? 0	? 0	–	? 0	? 2	–	–	–	Tie
2015 regional election	27 Sep 2015	—N/a	75.9	–	8.7 (0)	5.9 (0)			12.5 (1)	8.6 (0)			2.1 (0)	4.8 (0)	56.1; 5	43.6
2014 EP election	25 May 2014	—N/a	46.2	30.7 (3)	10.0 (0)	6.6 (0)	32.9 (3)	6.9 (4)	3.5 (2)	–	2.4 (2)			–	–	3.2
Feedback/La Vanguardia	30 Apr–8 May 2014	?	?	? 2	? 1	? 1	? 1	? 1	–	–	–			–	–	?
Feedback/La Vanguardia	2–6 Sep 2013	?	?	? 2	? 1	? 1	? 2	? 0	–	–	–			–	–	Tie
2012 regional election	25 Nov 2012	—N/a	69.3	43.0 (4)	10.1 (1)	9.6 (0)	17.8 (1)	5.9 (0)	3.6 (0)	4.2 (0)	–			–	–	25.2
Feedback/La Vanguardia	21–27 Sep 2012	?	?	? 3	? 1	? 1	? 1	? 0	–	–	–			–	–	?
2011 general election	20 Nov 2011	—N/a	62.4	39.2; 3	21.4; 1	16.2; 1	10.8; 1	5.5; 0	–	–	–			–	–	17.8

=== Granada ===
Polling firm/Commissioner	Fieldwork date	Sample size	Turnout	PP	PSOE	IULV	UPYD	Podemos	C's	Lead
2015 general election	20 Dec 2015	—N/a	68.8	31.1; 3	31.0; 2	5.1; 0	0.5; 0	16.4; 1	13.9; 1	0.1
GIPEyOP	27 Nov–14 Dec 2015	129	?	28.3; 2	28.7; 2	3.3; 0	–	22.1; 2	14.9; 1	0.4
GAD3/ABC	16 Nov–11 Dec 2015	?	?	? 2	? 2	–	–	? 1	? 2	Tie
Sigma Dos/El Mundo	1–9 Dec 2015	?	?	28.0; 2	28.0; 2	3.0; 1	–	18.0; 1	21.0; 2	Tie
Redondo & Asociados	1–9 Dec 2015	?	?	28.1; 3	28.1; 2	–	–	18.5; 1	17.9; 1	Tie
Redondo & Asociados	25 Nov–1 Dec 2015	?	?	29.5; 2	25.3; 2	–	–	18.1; 1	19.9; 2	4.2
CIS	27 Oct–16 Nov 2015	325	?	? 2/3	? 2/3	–	–	? 1	? 1/2	Tie
GAD3/ABC	19 Oct–12 Nov 2015	?	?	? 2	? 2	–	–	? 1	? 2	Tie
2015 regional election	22 Mar 2015	—N/a	61.4	30.0 (3)	34.6 (3)	6.1 (0)	1.8 (0)	13.9 (1)	9.6 (0)	4.6
2014 EP election	25 May 2014	—N/a	43.3	28.3 (3)	35.3 (3)	10.7 (1)	6.8 (0)	6.1 (0)	1.9 (0)	7.0
2012 regional election	25 Mar 2012	—N/a	62.4	43.5 (4)	39.5 (3)	10.0 (0)	3.4 (0)	–	–	4.0
2011 general election	20 Nov 2011	—N/a	69.9	46.7; 4	36.5; 3	7.9; 0	5.2; 0	–	–	10.2

=== Guadalajara ===
Polling firm/Commissioner	Fieldwork date	Sample size	Turnout	PP	PSOE	UPYD	IU–UPeC	Podemos	C's	Lead
2015 general election	20 Dec 2015	—N/a	75.6	34.8; 1	22.5; 1	0.8; 0	4.1; 0	17.5; 0	18.1; 1	12.3
GIPEyOP	27 Nov–14 Dec 2015	47	?	32.2; 1	22.8; 1	4.2; 0	–	21.1; 1	16.8; 0	9.4
GAD3/ABC	16 Nov–11 Dec 2015	?	?	? 1	? 1	–	–	? 0	? 1	Tie
Sigma Dos/El Mundo	1–9 Dec 2015	?	?	33.0; 1	20.0; 1	–	3.0; 0	15.0; 0	27.0; 1	6.0
Redondo & Asociados	1–9 Dec 2015	?	?	36.7; 2	? 0	–	–	? 0	23.3; 1	13.4
Redondo & Asociados	25 Nov–1 Dec 2015	?	?	36.1; 1	20.7; 1	–	–	? 0	23.0; 1	13.1
CIS	27 Oct–16 Nov 2015	232	?	? 1	? 1	–	–	? 0	? 1	Tie
2015 regional election	24 May 2015	—N/a	69.2	33.7 (2)	30.0 (1)	1.7 (0)	3.4 (0)	14.6 (0)	12.0 (0)	3.7
2014 EP election	25 May 2014	—N/a	47.0	33.7 (2)	22.3 (2)	9.5 (0)	9.5 (0)	8.8 (0)	3.9 (0)	11.4
2011 general election	20 Nov 2011	—N/a	74.8	54.0; 2	27.7; 1	7.5; 0	6.8; 0	–	–	26.3

=== Las Palmas ===
Polling firm/Commissioner	Fieldwork date	Sample size	Turnout	PP	PSOE	CC	IU–UPeC	UPYD	NCa	Podemos	C's	Lead
2015 general election	20 Dec 2015	—N/a	62.4	28.2; 3	22.4; 2	4.2; 0	3.0; 0	0.5; 0	(Note: Within PSOE.)	26.5; 2	12.3; 1	1.7
GIPEyOP	27 Nov–14 Dec 2015	85	?	17.0; 2	22.8; 2	8.2; 0	3.2; 0	3.5; 0		29.2; 3	13.5; 1	6.4
Hamalgama Métrica/La Provincia	5–12 Dec 2015	?	?	27.1; 2/3	26.1; 2	3.1; 0	2.0; 0	0.6; 0		17.8; 1/2	21.3; 2	1.0
TSA/Canarias7	4–11 Dec 2015	899	66.5	22.7; 2	27.6; 2/3	5.8; 0	–	–		18.7; 1/2	18.8; 1/2	4.9
GAD3/ABC	16 Nov–11 Dec 2015	?	?	? 3	? 2	? 0	–	–		? 2	? 1	?
Sigma Dos/El Mundo	1–9 Dec 2015	?	?	32.0; 3	18.0; 2	6.0; 0	–	–		17.0; 1	21.0; 2	11.0
Redondo & Asociados	1–9 Dec 2015	?	?	29.5; 3	25.2; 3	? 0	–	–		15.6; 1	16.5; 1	4.3
TSA/Canarias7	25 Nov–3 Dec 2015	?	?	22.3; 2	27.3; 3	4.5; 0	–	–		17.2; 1	20.9; 2	5.0
Redondo & Asociados	25 Nov–1 Dec 2015	?	?	31.4; 3	19.0; 2	10.0; 1	–	–		11.5; 1	17.6; 1	12.4
CIS	27 Oct–16 Nov 2015	356	?	? 3	? 2	? 0	–	–		? 2	? 1	?
2015 regional election	24 May 2015	—N/a	57.6	19.2 (2)	17.8 (2)	9.4 (1)	1.9 (0)	0.9 (0)	16.6 (2)	16.5 (1)	6.1 (0)	1.4
2014 EP election	25 May 2014	—N/a	36.3	23.9 (3)	21.4 (2)	9.8 (1)	10.6 (1)	7.2 (0)	–	13.6 (1)	1.5 (0)	2.5
2011 general election	20 Nov 2011	—N/a	60.5	51.0; 5	26.2; 2	11.3; 1	4.2; 0	2.8; 0	(Note: Within CC.)	–	–	24.8

=== Lugo ===
Polling firm/Commissioner	Fieldwork date	Sample size	Turnout	PP	PSdeG–PSOE	Nós	IU–UPeC	UPYD	AGE	Podemos	C's	En Marea	Lead
2015 general election	20 Dec 2015	—N/a	59.2	42.5; 2	24.0; 1	3.6; 0		0.5; 0			7.6; 0	19.2; 1	18.5
GIPEyOP	27 Nov–14 Dec 2015	44	?	44.0; 3	14.4; 0	5.3; 0		–			5.8; 0	24.8; 1	19.2
GAD3/ABC	16 Nov–11 Dec 2015	?	?	? 2	? 1	? 0		–			? 0	? 1	?
Sondaxe/La Voz de Galicia	1–9 Dec 2015	350	?	44.0; 2	19.2; 1	? 0		–			14.3; 0	14.5; 1	24.8
Sigma Dos/El Mundo	1–9 Dec 2015	?	?	43.0; 2	17.0; 1	5.0; 0		–			13.0; 0	18.0; 1	25.0
Redondo & Asociados	1–9 Dec 2015	?	?	41.1; 2	19.0; 1	? 0		–			21.3; 1	? 0	19.8
Redondo & Asociados	25 Nov–1 Dec 2015	?	?	38.8; 2	21.3; 1	? 0		–			20.2; 1	? 0	17.5
CIS	27 Oct–16 Nov 2015	255	?	? 2	? 1	? 0		–			? 0	? 1	?
2014 EP election	25 May 2014	—N/a	38.4	42.3 (3)	23.7 (1)	6.8 (0)		2.9 (0)	8.1 (0)	5.7 (0)	1.1 (0)	–	18.6
2012 regional election	21 Oct 2012	—N/a	56.0	51.5 (3)	22.7 (1)	8.7 (0)		0.9 (0)	10.3 (0)	–	–	–	28.8
2011 general election	20 Nov 2011	—N/a	62.8	56.1; 3	28.3; 1	9.2; 0	3.1; 0	0.9; 0	–	–	–	–	27.8

=== Málaga ===
Polling firm/Commissioner	Fieldwork date	Sample size	Turnout	PP	PSOE	IULV	UPYD	Podemos	C's	Lead
2015 general election	20 Dec 2015	—N/a	67.5	28.9; 4	26.9; 3	6.8; 0	0.6; 0	17.1; 2	17.1; 2	2.0
GIPEyOP	27 Nov–14 Dec 2015	130	?	27.1; 3	25.0; 3	5.7; 0	–	20.7; 3	19.1; 2	2.1
Celeste-Tel	1–12 Dec 2015	400	?	28.3; 4	31.3; 4	? 0	–	13.4; 1	19.5; 2	3.0
GAD3/ABC	16 Nov–11 Dec 2015	?	?	? 3	? 3	? 1	–	? 1	? 3	Tie
Sigma Dos/El Mundo	1–9 Dec 2015	?	?	26.0; 3	24.0; 3	7.0; 0/1	–	16.0; 2	24.0; 2/3	2.0
Redondo & Asociados	1–9 Dec 2015	?	?	28.4; 4	27.6; 3	? 0	–	17.7; 2	17.9; 2	0.8
Redondo & Asociados	25 Nov–1 Dec 2015	?	?	30.4; 4	23.6; 3	? 0	–	17.7; 2	20.0; 2	7.1
CIS	27 Oct–16 Nov 2015	467	?	? 3	? 4	? 0	–	? 1	? 3	?
GAD3/ABC	19 Oct–12 Nov 2015	?	?	? 4	? 3	? 1	–	? 1	? 2	?
2015 regional election	22 Mar 2015	—N/a	58.9	28.3 (3)	30.1 (4)	7.4 (0)	2.6 (0)	15.1 (2)	11.8 (1)	1.8
2014 EP election	25 May 2014	—N/a	40.5	25.5 (3)	30.1 (4)	12.7 (1)	9.2 (1)	7.4 (1)	2.4 (0)	4.6
2012 regional election	25 Mar 2012	—N/a	56.3	43.7 (5)	35.3 (4)	12.2 (1)	4.3 (0)	–	–	8.4
2011 general election	20 Nov 2011	—N/a	65.1	49.7; 6	31.6; 3	9.0; 1	5.6; 0	–	–	18.1

=== Melilla ===
Color key:

Exit poll

Polling firm/Commissioner	Fieldwork date	Sample size	Turnout	PP	PSOE	UPYD	IU–UPeC		PPL	Podemos	C's	Lead
2015 general election	20 Dec 2015	—N/a	49.4	43.9; 1	24.6; 0	0.9; 0	1.3; 0	–	–	11.4; 0	15.5; 0	19.3
TNS Demoscopia/RTVE–FORTA	20 Dec 2015	?	?	48.5; 1	24.0; 0	1.6; 0	2.4; 0	–	–	7.9; 0	13.5; 0	24.5
GIPEyOP	27 Nov–14 Dec 2015	21	?	39.5; 1	15.9; 0	–	–	–	–	10.1; 0	16.7; 0	22.8
GAD3/ABC	16 Nov–11 Dec 2015	?	?	? 1	? 0	–	–	–	–	? 0	? 0	?
Redondo & Asociados	1–9 Dec 2015	?	?	41.7; 1	? 0	–	–	–	–	? 0	? 0	?
GAD3/ABC	10 Nov–3 Dec 2015	?	?	? 1	? 0	–	–	–	–	? 0	? 0	?
SyM Consulting/La Luz	1–2 Dec 2015	502	54.5	53.1; 1	18.8; 0	2.2; 0	–	–	–	6.1; 0	15.1; 0	34.3
Redondo & Asociados	25 Nov–1 Dec 2015	?	?	43.0; 1	? 0	–	–	–	–	? 0	? 0	?
CIS	27 Oct–16 Nov 2015	200	?	? 1	? 0	–	–	–	–	? 0	? 0	?
SyM Consulting/La Luz	6–7 Oct 2015	633	64.8	49.1; 1	13.7; 0	–	–	–	–	12.5; 0	16.4; 0	32.7
SyM Consulting/La Luz	25–27 Sep 2015	519	77.6	33.6; 1	14.1; 0	0.8; 0	–	7.9; 0	1.6; 0	10.4; 0	23.2; 0	10.4
2015 Assembly election	24 May 2015	—N/a	56.1	42.7; 1	12.6; 0	1.1; 0	0.8; 0	26.4; 0	5.4; 0	2.6; 0	6.8; 0	16.3
2014 EP election	25 May 2014	—N/a	26.1	44.0; 1	25.0; 0	7.0; 0	3.3; 0	–	–	2.9; 0	1.8; 0	19.0
Metroscopia/El País	30 Nov 2013	?	?	? 1	? 0	–	–	–	–	–	–	?
NC Report/La Razón	1–17 Feb 2012	125	?	? 1	? 0	–	–	–	–	–	–	?
2011 general election	20 Nov 2011	—N/a	49.4	66.7; 1	25.3; 0	3.7; 0	–	–	–	–	–	41.4

=== Ourense ===
Polling firm/Commissioner	Fieldwork date	Sample size	Turnout	PP	PSdeG–PSOE	Nós	IU–UPeC	UPYD	AGE	Podemos	C's	En Marea	Lead
2015 general election	20 Dec 2015	—N/a	53.5	44.9; 2	23.2; 1	3.3; 0		0.4; 0			7.9; 0	17.8; 1	21.7
GIPEyOP	27 Nov–14 Dec 2015	28	?	38.7; 3	12.0; 0	4.6; 0		–			9.2; 0	25.7; 1	13.0
GAD3/ABC	16 Nov–11 Dec 2015	?	?	? 3	? 1	? 0		–			? 0	? 0	?
Sondaxe/La Voz de Galicia	1–9 Dec 2015	350	?	40.1; 2	23.8; 1	5.4; 0		–			12.3; 0	14.1; 1	16.3
Sigma Dos/El Mundo	1–9 Dec 2015	?	?	43.0; 2	21.0; 1	2.0; 0		–			11.0; 0	20.0; 1	22.0
Redondo & Asociados	1–9 Dec 2015	?	?	43.3; 2	17.5; 1	? 0		–			21.6; 1	? 0	21.7
Infortécnica	16 Nov–9 Dec 2015	321	?	? 2/3	? 0/1	? 0		–			? 0	? 1	?
Redondo & Asociados	25 Nov–1 Dec 2015	?	?	41.1; 2	19.7; 1	? 0		–			20.6; 1	? 0	20.5
CIS	27 Oct–16 Nov 2015	252	?	? 2	? 1	? 0		–			? 0	? 1	?
2014 EP election	25 May 2014	—N/a	35.9	44.7 (3)	23.4 (1)	6.0 (0)		2.7 (0)	6.8 (0)	5.1 (0)	1.2 (0)	–	21.3
2012 regional election	21 Oct 2012	—N/a	51.5	49.2 (3)	23.7 (1)	8.5 (0)		0.6 (0)	7.8 (0)	–	–	–	25.5
2011 general election	20 Nov 2011	—N/a	57.1	56.7; 3	28.1; 1	9.3; 0	2.3; 0	0.8; 0	–	–	–	–	28.6

=== Pontevedra ===
Polling firm/Commissioner	Fieldwork date	Sample size	Turnout	PP	PSdeG–PSOE	Nós	IU–UPeC	UPYD	AGE	Podemos	C's	En Marea	Lead
2015 general election	20 Dec 2015	—N/a	64.3	34.5; 3	20.8; 2	4.6; 0		0.6; 0			9.0; 0	27.9; 2	6.6
GIPEyOP	27 Nov–14 Dec 2015	108	?	27.9; 2	14.0; 1	9.3; 0		–			19.5; 2	25.4; 2	2.5
GAD3/ABC	16 Nov–11 Dec 2015	?	?	? 3	? 1/2	? 0		–			? 1	? 1/2	?
Sondaxe/La Voz de Galicia	1–9 Dec 2015	500	?	36.4; 3	15.9; 1	? 0		–			17.4; 1	22.8; 2	13.6
Sigma Dos/El Mundo	1–9 Dec 2015	?	?	31.0; 2	25.0; 2	2.0; 0		–			17.0; 1	22.0; 2	6.0
Redondo & Asociados	1–9 Dec 2015	?	?	38.6; 3	19.2; 1	? 0		–			20.7; 2	15.1; 1	17.9
Infortécnica	16 Nov–9 Dec 2015	374	?	? 3	? 1/2	? 0		–			? 1	? 1/2	?
Redondo & Asociados	25 Nov–1 Dec 2015	?	?	36.1; 3	21.3; 2	? 0		–			19.4; 1	13.2; 1	14.8
CIS	27 Oct–16 Nov 2015	380	?	? 3	? 1/2	? 0		–			? 1	? 1/2	?
2014 EP election	25 May 2014	—N/a	40.4	32.4 (3)	21.2 (2)	8.9 (0)		3.6 (0)	11.4 (1)	9.4 (1)	1.6 (0)	–	11.2
2012 regional election	21 Oct 2012	—N/a	56.4	42.8 (4)	20.8 (1)	11.9 (1)		1.6 (0)	14.4 (1)	–	–	–	22.0
2011 general election	20 Nov 2011	—N/a	63.9	50.8; 4	28.1; 2	12.0; 1	4.6; 0	1.3; 0	–	–	–	–	22.7

=== Santa Cruz de Tenerife ===
Polling firm/Commissioner	Fieldwork date	Sample size	Turnout	PP	PSOE	CC	IU–UPeC	UPYD	NCa	Podemos	C's	Lead
2015 general election	20 Dec 2015	—N/a	58.2	28.9; 2	21.5; 2	12.6; 1	3.3; 0	0.4; 0		19.9; 1	10.5; 1	7.4
GIPEyOP	27 Nov–14 Dec 2015	100	?	15.9; 1	20.7; 1	21.3; 2	3.9; 0	3.1; 0		22.4; 2	12.5; 1	1.1
Hamalgama Métrica/La Provincia	5–12 Dec 2015	?	?	22.2; 1/2	22.3; 2	11.0; 0/1	2.6; 0	0.7; 0		15.4; 1	23.1; 2	0.8
TSA/Canarias7	4–11 Dec 2015	903	65	21.0; 1/2	22.8; 2	13.6; 1	–	–		17.0; 1	20.8; 1/2	1.8
GAD3/ABC	16 Nov–11 Dec 2015	?	?	? 3	? 1	? 1	–	–		? 1	? 1	?
Sigma Dos/El Mundo	1–9 Dec 2015	?	?	32.0; 3	17.0; 1	10.0; 0/1	–	–		16.0; 1	20.0; 1/2	12.0
Redondo & Asociados	1–9 Dec 2015	?	?	24.7; 2	23.8; 2	14.9; 1	–	–		13.4; 1	16.7; 1	0.9
TSA/Canarias7	25 Nov–3 Dec 2015	?	?	20.6; 1/2	22.1; 2	12.7; 1	–	–		15.9; 1	20.9; 1/2	1.2
Redondo & Asociados	25 Nov–1 Dec 2015	?	?	24.2; 2	17.4; 2	16.0; 1	–	–		10.9; 1	14.5; 1	6.8
CIS	27 Oct–16 Nov 2015	375	?	? 3	? 1/2	? 1	–	–		? 0/1	? 1	?
2015 regional election	24 May 2015	—N/a	54.6	18.0 (1	22.1 (2	27.6 (3	2.6 (0	0.8 (0	3.5 (0	12.5 (1	5.8 (0	5.5
2014 EP election	25 May 2014	—N/a	33.7	22.9 (2)	23.1 (2)	14.8 (1)	10.3 (1)	6.6 (0)	–	8.2 (1)	1.3 (0)	0.2
2011 general election	20 Nov 2011	—N/a	58.7	44.8; 4	23.5; 2	19.8; 1	4.4; 0	2.5; 0		–	–	21.3

=== Seville ===
Polling firm/Commissioner	Fieldwork date	Sample size	Turnout	PSOE	PP	IULV	UPYD	Podemos	C's	Lead
2015 general election	20 Dec 2015	—N/a	72.2	33.9; 5	25.2; 3	5.7; 0	0.6; 0	19.0; 2	13.0; 2	8.7
GIPEyOP	27 Nov–14 Dec 2015	221	?	31.5; 4	22.9; 3	6.3; 0	–	25.4; 4	11.1; 1	6.1
GAD3/ABC	16 Nov–11 Dec 2015	?	?	? 5	? 3/4	? 0/1	–	? 1	? 2	?
Sigma Dos/El Mundo	1–9 Dec 2015	?	?	31.0; 4	23.0; 3	7.0; 1	–	17.0; 2	20.0; 2	8.0
Redondo & Asociados	1–9 Dec 2015	?	?	32.9; 4	21.4; 3	? 0	–	20.3; 3	16.7; 2	11.5
Redondo & Asociados	25 Nov–1 Dec 2015	?	?	29.1; 4	23.0; 3	? 0	–	20.5; 3	18.7; 2	6.1
Metroscopia/El País	27 Nov 2015	500	75	35.7; 5	23.6; 3	6.2; 0	–	14.5; 2	16.7; 2	12.1
CIS	27 Oct–16 Nov 2015	480	?	? 4/5	? 3	? 1	–	? 1	? 2/3	?
GAD3/ABC	19 Oct–12 Nov 2015	?	?	? 5	? 3	? 1	–	? 1	? 2	?
2015 regional election	22 Mar 2015	—N/a	66.0	38.1 (5)	21.9 (3)	7.0 (1)	1.9 (0)	16.6 (2)	9.2 (1)	16.2
2014 EP election	25 May 2014	—N/a	44.4	37.2 (6)	22.1 (3)	12.1 (1)	7.4 (1)	7.8 (1)	1.7 (0)	15.1
2012 regional election	25 Mar 2012	—N/a	64.0	43.1 (6)	35.3 (5)	12.2 (1)	3.7 (0)	–	–	7.8
2011 general election	20 Nov 2011	—N/a	71.2	41.7; 6	38.7; 5	8.6; 1	5.5; 0	–	–	3.0

=== Teruel ===
Polling firm/Commissioner	Fieldwork date	Sample size	Turnout	PP	PSOE	IU–UPeC	UPYD	PAR	CHA	Podemos	C's	Lead
2015 general election	20 Dec 2015	—N/a	71.6	36.4; 2	25.7; 1	5.0; 0	0.6; 0	(Note: Within PP.)	(Note: Within UPeC.)	15.3; 0	14.7; 0	10.7
GIPEyOP	27 Nov–14 Dec 2015	70	?	31.6; 1	20.1; 1	5.8; 0	–			19.7; 1	17.0; 0	11.5
GAD3/ABC	16 Nov–11 Dec 2015	?	?	? 1	? 1	–	–			? 0	? 1	Tie
A+M/Heraldo de Aragón	26 Nov–10 Dec 2015	?	?	? 2	? 1	–	–			? 0	? 0	?
Sigma Dos/El Mundo	1–9 Dec 2015	?	?	32.0; 1	27.0; 1	3.0; 0	–			15.0; 0	20.0; 1	5.0
Redondo & Asociados	1–9 Dec 2015	?	?	31.7; 1	18.8; 1	–	–			? 0	16.2; 1	12.9
Redondo & Asociados	25 Nov–1 Dec 2015	?	?	32.1; 1	22.6; 1	–	–			? 0	19.1; 1	9.5
Metroscopia/El País	26–27 Nov 2015	400	77	27.6; 1	24.9; 1	5.6; 0	–			14.5; 0	21.7; 1	2.7
CIS	27 Oct–16 Nov 2015	240	?	? 2	? 1	–	–			? 0	? 0	?
2015 regional election	24 May 2015	—N/a	69.3	27.5 (1)	22.0 (1)	4.6 (0)	–	13.7 (0)	3.4 (0)	16.1 (1)	7.2 (0)	5.5
2014 EP election	25 May 2014	—N/a	44.1	35.7 (2)	27.1 (1)	8.1 (0)	6.1 (0)	–	3.3 (0)	7.8 (0)	1.8 (0)	8.6
2011 general election	20 Nov 2011	—N/a	70.3	51.8; 2	32.9; 1	7.9; 0	3.4; 0		(Note: Within IU.)	–	–	18.9

=== Valencia ===
Polling firm/Commissioner	Fieldwork date	Sample size	Turnout	PP	PSOE	IU–UPeC	Compromís	UPYD	Podemos	C's	És el moment	Lead
2015 general election	20 Dec 2015	—N/a	75.9	30.2; 5	18.8; 3	4.7; 0		0.7; 0		15.1; 2	27.1; 5	3.1
GIPEyOP	27 Nov–14 Dec 2015	6,371	?	24.7; 4	19.5; 3	6.0; 1		–		16.8; 3	27.9; 4	3.2
GAD3/ABC	16 Nov–11 Dec 2015	?	?	? 5	? 3	? 1		–		? 3	? 3	?
Sigma Dos/El Mundo	1–9 Dec 2015	?	?	27.0; 4/5	20.0; 3	8.0; 1		–		19.0; 3	23.0; 3/4	4.0
Redondo & Asociados	1–9 Dec 2015	?	?	27.3; 5	20.3; 3	? 0		–		25.1; 4	18.5; 3	2.2
Metroscopia/El País	2–3 Dec 2015	500	80	23.6; 4	21.9; 3	6.0; 0/1		0.4; 0		23.1; 3/4	24.0; 4	0.4
Redondo & Asociados	25 Nov–1 Dec 2015	?	?	27.3; 4	23.5; 4	? 0		–		24.6; 4	16.9; 3	2.7
ODEC/PSPV	23 Nov 2015	?	?	? 4	? 4	? 0/1		–		? 3	? 3/4	Tie
Sigma Dos/IU	19–23 Nov 2015	680	?	28.2; 4/5	19.5; 3	6.8; 1		–		19.1; 3	22.1; 3/4	6.1
CIS	27 Oct–16 Nov 2015	535	?	? 4/5	? 3	? 0/1		–		? 3	? 4	?
GAD3/ABC	14–29 Oct 2015	?	?	? 5	? 4	? 0	? 2	–	? 1	? 3	–	?
Metroscopia/El País	5–7 Oct 2015	508	?	? 4	? 4	? 1	? 1	–	? 2	? 4	–	Tie
2015 regional election	24 May 2015	—N/a	71.5	25.3 (5)	18.6 (3)	4.5 (0)	22.9 (4)	1.1 (0)	10.9 (2)	11.8 (2)	–	2.4
JM&A/El Mundo	17 May 2015	?	?	26.7; 5	19.9; 3	? 0	7.7; 1	? 0	18.3; 3	19.6; 3	–	6.8
2014 EP election	25 May 2014	—N/a	51.8	27.5 (6)	20.6 (4)	11.3 (2)	10.1 (2)	8.5 (1)	7.9 (1)	2.8 (0)	–	6.9
2011 general election	20 Nov 2011	—N/a	74.9	52.2; 9	26.0; 4	6.8; 1	6.0; 1	5.9; 1	–	–	–	26.2

=== Zaragoza ===
Polling firm/Commissioner	Fieldwork date	Sample size	Turnout	PP	PSOE	IU–UPeC	UPYD	PAR	CHA	Podemos	C's	Lead
2015 general election	20 Dec 2015	—N/a	73.1	30.3; 3	22.3; 2	6.5; 0	0.8; 0			19.2; 1	17.8; 1	8.0
GIPEyOP	27 Nov–14 Dec 2015	201	?	29.1; 2	17.6; 1	10.1; 1	–			22.6; 2	17.3; 1	6.5
GAD3/ABC	16 Nov–11 Dec 2015	?	?	? 2	? 2	? 0	–			? 2	? 1	Tie
A+M/Heraldo de Aragón	26 Nov–10 Dec 2015	?	?	? 2	? 2	? 0	–			? 1	? 2	Tie
Sigma Dos/El Mundo	1–9 Dec 2015	?	?	26.0; 2	18.0; 1/2	8.0; 0	–			19.0; 1/2	27.0; 2	1.0
Redondo & Asociados	1–9 Dec 2015	?	?	27.4; 3	18.0; 1	? 0	–			16.5; 1	18.6; 2	8.8
Redondo & Asociados	25 Nov–1 Dec 2015	?	?	28.5; 2	22.2; 2	? 0	–			16.1; 1	19.4; 2	6.3
Metroscopia/El País	27–28 Nov 2015	500	78	24.3; 2	26.0; 2	8.1; 0	–			14.0; 1	21.3; 2	1.7
CIS	27 Oct–16 Nov 2015	417	?	? 3	? 2	? 0	–			? 1	? 1	?
2015 regional election	24 May 2015	—N/a	65.8	27.8 (2)	20.1 (2)	4.4 (0)	1.1 (0)	5.2 (0)	5.1 (0)	21.7 (2)	10.0 (1)	6.1
2014 EP election	25 May 2014	—N/a	46.4	26.2 (2)	23.4 (2)	9.8 (1)	9.1 (1)	–	4.8 (0)	9.9 (1)	3.2 (0)	2.8
2011 general election	20 Nov 2011	—N/a	71.4	46.9; 4	30.8; 2	11.5; 1	6.4; 0			–	–	16.1

== See also ==
- Opinion polling for the 2015 Spanish general election
