= Regional opinion polling for the 2015 Spanish general election =

In the run up to the 2015 Spanish general election, various organisations carried out opinion polling to gauge voting intention in autonomous communities in Spain during the term of the 10th Cortes Generales. Results of such polls are displayed in this article. The date range for these opinion polls is from the previous general election, held on 20 November 2011, to the day the next election was held, on 20 December 2015.

Voting intention estimates refer mainly to a hypothetical Congress of Deputies election. Polls are listed in reverse chronological order, showing the most recent first and using the dates when the survey fieldwork was done, as opposed to the date of publication. Where the fieldwork dates are unknown, the date of publication is given instead. The highest percentage figure in each polling survey is displayed with its background shaded in the leading party's colour. If a tie ensues, this is applied to the figures with the highest percentages. The "Lead" columns on the right shows the percentage-point difference between the parties with the highest percentages in a given poll.

Refusals are generally excluded from the party vote percentages, while question wording and the treatment of "don't know" responses and those not intending to vote may vary between polling organisations. When available, seat projections are displayed below the percentages in a smaller font.

== Autonomous communities ==
=== Andalusia ===
Color key:

Exit poll

Polling firm/Commissioner	Fieldwork date	Sample size	Turnout	PP	PSOE	IULV	UPyD	Podemos	C's	Lead
2015 general election	20 Dec 2015	—N/a	69.1	29.1; 21	31.5; 22	5.8; 0	0.5; 0	16.9; 10	13.8; 8	2.4
TNS Demoscopia/RTVE–FORTA	20 Dec 2015	?	?	28.2; 19/22	28.6; 19/22	6.2; 0/1	1.1; 0	16.9; 9/11	16.1; 9/11	0.4
GIPEyOP	27 Nov–14 Dec 2015	902	?	24.4; 15/18	28.3; 18/20	5.2; 0/1	–	22.3; 13/15	16.6; 9/11	3.9
Celeste-Tel	1–12 Dec 2015	3,200	?	29.5; 22	33.6; 26	5.3; 0	–	11.8; 4	17.6; 9	4.1
GAD3/ABC	16 Nov–11 Dec 2015	?	?	? 19/20	? 21	? 1/3	–	? 6/7	? 12	?
Sigma Dos/El Mundo	1–9 Dec 2015	?	?	28.0; 19/20	28.0; 18/19	5.0; 1/2	–	16.0; 9	21.0; 12/13	Tie
Redondo & Asociados	1–9 Dec 2015	?	?	26.2; 19	29.6; 20	? 0	–	18.6; 12	17.2; 10	3.4
NC Report/La Razón	13 Nov–7 Dec 2015	2,300	?	28.4; 19	33.0; 24	5.0; 0	0.4; 0	18.0; 10	13.3; 8	4.6
JM&A/Público	6 Dec 2015	?	?	28.1; 21	26.7; 17	? 0	–	? 8	? 15	1.4
diarioelectoral.com	2–4 Dec 2015	1,800	?	27.2; 17	39.7; 26	4.0; 0	–	13.1; 8	15.5; 10	12.5
A+M/20minutos	26 Nov–4 Dec 2015	950	?	? 19/22	? 16/18	? 0	–	? 8	? 15/16	?
GAD3/ABC	10 Nov–3 Dec 2015	?	?	? 20/21	? 22	? 0/1	–	? 6	? 11/13	?
Redondo & Asociados	25 Nov–1 Dec 2015	?	?	28.0; 19	25.9; 18	? 0	–	18.6; 12	19.3; 12	2.1
Commentia/Grupo Joly	20–30 Nov 2015	850	?	28.2; 22	27.3; 21	4.8; 1	–	13.0; 5	20.7; 12	0.9
Deimos Estadística	22 Nov 2015	?	?	21.9; 18	30.6; 21	8.0; 2	–	16.1; 8	17.3; 12	8.7
JM&A/Público	19 Nov 2015	?	?	28.6; 21	26.8; 17	? 2	–	13.5; 7	18.7; 14	1.8
CIS	27 Oct–16 Nov 2015	2,689	?	? 19/21	? 21/25	? 1	–	? 5	? 11/14	?
GAD3/ABC	19 Oct–12 Nov 2015	?	?	? 21	? 23	? 2	–	? 6	? 9	?
JM&A/Público	22 Oct 2015	?	?	28.7; 21	31.7; 23	? 0	–	14.0; 8	? 9	3.0
Celeste-Tel	7–26 Sep 2015	1,200	?	28.5; 22	33.9; 25	5.2; 0	–	15.1; 8	12.2; 6	5.4
2015 regional election	22 Mar 2015	—N/a	62.3	26.7 (20)	35.4; 27)	6.9 (1)	1.9 (0)	14.9 (9)	9.3 (3)	8.7
2014 EP election	25 May 2014	—N/a	41.9	25.9 (21)	35.1 (29)	11.6 (5)	7.1 (2)	7.1 (3)	1.7 (0)	9.2
Metroscopia/El País	30 Nov 2013	?	?	? 24	? 26	? 9	? 1	–	–	?
2012 regional election	25 Mar 2012	—N/a	60.8	40.7 (30)	39.6 (26)	11.3 (4)	3.4 (0)	–	–	1.1
NC Report/La Razón	1–17 Feb 2012	550	?	? 33	? 24	? 2	? 1	–	–	?
2011 general election	20 Nov 2011	—N/a	68.9	45.6; 33	36.6; 25	8.3; 2	4.8; 0	–	–	9.0

=== Aragon ===
Color key:

Exit poll

Polling firm/Commissioner	Fieldwork date	Sample size	Turnout	PP	PSOE	IU–UPeC	UPyD	PAR	CHA	Podemos	C's	Lead
2015 general election	20 Dec 2015	—N/a	72.6	31.3; 6	23.0; 4	6.2; 0	0.8; 0	(Note: Within PP.)	(Note: Within UPeC.)	18.6; 2	17.2; 1	8.3
TNS Demoscopia/RTVE–FORTA	20 Dec 2015	?	?	28.2; 4/5	23.0; 4	6.2; 0	1.2; 0			20.6; 3/4	18.3; 1/2	5.2
GIPEyOP	27 Nov–14 Dec 2015	316	?	29.7; 4/5	18.8; 2/3	8.8; 0/1	–			22.1; 3/4	16.8; 1/2	7.6
GAD3/ABC	16 Nov–11 Dec 2015	?	?	? 4	? 4	? 0	–			? 2	? 3	Tie
NC Report/La Razón	13 Nov–11 Dec 2015	800	?	33.9; 7	23.7; 4	5.2; 0	0.3; 0			17.2; 1	17.8; 1	10.2
A+M/Heraldo de Aragón	26 Nov–10 Dec 2015	1,600	?	31.4; 5	22.8; 4	6.6; 0	–			15.2; 1	20.8; 3	8.6
Sigma Dos/El Mundo	1–9 Dec 2015	?	?	27.0; 4	19.0; 3/4	7.0; 0	–			18.0; 1/2	26.0; 4	1.0
Redondo & Asociados	1–9 Dec 2015	?	?	28.1; 5	18.4; 3	? 0	–			15.6; 1	18.4; 4	9.7
GAD3/ABC	10 Nov–3 Dec 2015	?	?	? 4	? 4	? 0	–			? 2	? 3	Tie
Redondo & Asociados	25 Nov–1 Dec 2015	?	?	29.1; 4	22.6; 4	? 0	–			15.3; 1	19.4; 4	6.5
CIS	27 Oct–16 Nov 2015	897	?	? 6	? 4	? 0	–			? 1	? 2	?
2015 regional election	24 May 2015	—N/a	66.3	27.5 (4)	21.4 (4)	4.2 (0)	0.9 (0)	6.9 (0)	4.6 (0)	20.6 (4)	9.4 (1)	6.1
2014 EP election	25 May 2014	—N/a	45.7	27.9 (6)	24.3 (4)	9.4 (1)	8.5 (1)	–	4.5 (0)	9.5 (1)	2.9 (0)	3.6
Metroscopia/El País	30 Nov 2013	?	?	? 6	? 6	? 1	–	–	(Note: Within IU.)	–	–	Tie
NC Report/La Razón	1–17 Feb 2012	250	?	? 8	? 4	? 1	–			–	–	?
2011 general election	20 Nov 2011	—N/a	71.0	47.7; 8	31.5; 4	10.5; 1	5.8; 0			–	–	16.2

=== Asturias ===
Color key:

Exit poll

Polling firm/Commissioner	Fieldwork date	Sample size	Turnout	PP	PSOE	FAC	IU–UPeC	UPyD	Podemos	C's	Lead
2015 general election	20 Dec 2015	—N/a	63.8	30.1; 3	23.3; 2		8.4; 0	0.6; 0	21.3; 2	13.6; 1	6.8
TNS Demoscopia/RTVE–FORTA	20 Dec 2015	?	?	25.3; 2/3	21.2; 2		9.1; 0/1	0.7; 0	25.4; 2/3	15.0; 1	0.1
GIPEyOP	27 Nov–14 Dec 2015	201	?	23.5; 2	24.5; 2		7.8; 0	–	21.8; 1/2	18.1; 1/2	1.0
GAD3/ABC	16 Nov–11 Dec 2015	?	?	? 3	? 2		? 0	–	? 2	? 1	?
Sigma Dos/El Mundo	1–9 Dec 2015	?	?	37.0; 4	18.0; 1/2		9.0; 0/1	–	15.0; 1	17.0; 1	19.0
Redondo & Asociados	1–9 Dec 2015	?	?	30.0; 3	19.4; 2		? 0	–	21.8; 2	19.1; 1	8.2
NC Report/La Razón	13 Nov–9 Dec 2015	400	?	27.8; 3	25.1; 2		8.5; 0	0.2; 0	19.1; 2	16.2; 1	2.7
GAD3/ABC	10 Nov–3 Dec 2015	?	?	? 3	? 2		? 0	–	? 2	? 1	?
Redondo & Asociados	25 Nov–1 Dec 2015	?	?	29.4; 3	22.6; 2		? 0	–	20.0; 2	18.8; 1	6.8
CIS	27 Oct–16 Nov 2015	419	?	? 3	? 2		? 1	–	? 1	? 1	?
2015 regional election	24 May 2015	—N/a	55.8	21.6 (2)	26.5 (3)	8.2 (0)	11.9 (1)	0.8 (0)	19.1 (1)	7.1 (0)	4.9
2014 EP election	25 May 2014	—N/a	39.0	24.2 (3)	26.1 (3)	4.2 (0)	12.9 (1)	6.0 (0)	13.6 (1)	2.5 (0)	1.9
Metroscopia/El País	30 Nov 2013	?	?	? 4	? 3	? 0	? 1	–	–	–	?
2012 regional election	25 Mar 2012	—N/a	51.1	21.5 (2)	32.1 (3)	24.8 (2)	13.8 (1)	3.7 (0)	–	–	7.3
NC Report/La Razón	1–17 Feb 2012	200	?	? 3	? 3	? 1	? 1	–	–	–	Tie
2011 general election	20 Nov 2011	—N/a	64.6	35.4; 3	29.3; 3	14.7; 1	13.2; 1	3.9; 0	–	–	6.1

=== Balearic Islands ===
Color key:

Exit poll

Polling firm/Commissioner	Fieldwork date	Sample size	Turnout	PP	PSOE	Més	IU–UPeC	UPyD	El Pi	Podemos	C's	Lead
2015 general election	20 Dec 2015	—N/a	63.3	29.1; 3	18.3; 2	7.0; 0	2.4; 0	0.5; 0	2.7; 0	23.1; 2	14.8; 1	6.0
TNS Demoscopia/RTVE–FORTA	20 Dec 2015	?	?	27.4; 2/3	18.5; 2	7.6; 0	2.3; 0	0.8; 0	2.6; 0	24.8; 2/3	14.0; 1	2.6
GIPEyOP	27 Nov–14 Dec 2015	147	?	27.4; 2/3	17.4; 1/2	9.5; 0/1	3.6; 0	–	? 0	24.8; 2/3	11.8; 1	2.6
Gadeso	13 Dec 2015	900	?	? 2/3	? 2	? 0/1	–	–	? 0	? 2	? 1/2	?
GAD3/ABC	16 Nov–11 Dec 2015	?	?	? 2/3	? 2	–	–	–	–	? 2	? 1/2	?
IBES/Última Hora	7–10 Dec 2015	?	?	26.0– 27.0; 2/3	19.0– 20.0; 2	7.0– 8.0; 0	? 0	–	4.0; 0	18.0– 19.0; 1/2	18.0– 20.0; 2	7.0
Sigma Dos/El Mundo	1–9 Dec 2015	?	?	32.0; 23	13.0; 1	–	3.0; 0	–	–	26.0; 2/3	16.0; 1/2	6.0
Redondo & Asociados	1–9 Dec 2015	?	?	33.5; 3	21.8; 1	–	? 0	–	–	17.7; 1	19.7; 2	11.7
NC Report/La Razón	13 Nov–5 Dec 2015	400	?	28.2; 3	24.5; 2	6.5; 0	1.1; 0	0.4; 0	4.3; 0	11.4; 1	19.4; 2	3.7
GAD3/ABC	10 Nov–3 Dec 2015	?	?	? 3	? 1	–	–	–	–	? 2	? 2	?
Redondo & Asociados	25 Nov–1 Dec 2015	?	?	34.4; 3	21.9; 1	–	? 0	–	–	13.1; 1	20.3; 2	12.5
CIS	27 Oct–16 Nov 2015	354	?	? 2/3	? 1/2	–	–	–	–	? 2	? 2	?
IBES/Última Hora	2–6 Nov 2015	1,500	?	25.0; 2/3	22.0; 2	7.0; 0/1	3.0; 0	–	4.0; 0	17.0; 1/2	21.0; 2	3.0
PSOE	11 Oct 2015	?	?	? 3	? 2/3	–	–	–	–	? 1	? 1/2	?
IBES/Última Hora	5–9 Oct 2015	1,040	?	26.0; 2/3	23.0; 2/3	(Note: Within Podemos.)	3.0; 0	–	5.0; 0	21.0; 1/2	19.0; 1/2	3.0
IBES/Última Hora	5–9 Oct 2015	1,040	?	27.0; 2/3	22.0; 2/3	8.0; 0	3.0; 0	–	4.0; 0	16.0; 1/2	18.0; 1/2	5.0
RegioPlus/Més	1–11 Sep 2015	1,011	?	25.0– 27.0; 3	18.0– 21.0; 2	11.5– 12.5; 1	3.0– 4.0; 0	–	2.0– 4.0; 0	16.0– 18.0; 1	10.5– 12.5; 1	6.0– 7.0
IBES/Última Hora	13–17 Jul 2015	600	?	27.0; 3	25.0; 2/3	9.0; 0/1	4.0; 0	–	5.0; 0	16.0; 1/2	10.0; 1	2.0
2015 regional election	24 May 2015	—N/a	57.1	28.5 (3)	19.4 (2)	15.3 (1)	2.0 (0)	0.9 (0)	7.9 (1)	14.7 (1)	6.4 (0)	9.1
2014 EP election	25 May 2014	—N/a	35.6	27.5 (3)	22.0 (3)	–	8.9 (1)	6.7 (0)	–	10.3 (1)	2.3 (0)	5.5
Metroscopia/El País	30 Nov 2013	?	?	? 4	? 4	–	–	–	–	–	–	Tie
NC Report/La Razón	1–17 Feb 2012	150	?	? 5	? 3	–	–	–	–	–	–	?
2011 general election	20 Nov 2011	—N/a	61.0	49.6; 5	28.9; 3	7.2; 0	4.9; 0	4.2; 0	–	–	–	20.7

=== Basque Country ===
Color key:

Exit poll

Polling firm/Commissioner	Fieldwork date	Sample size	Turnout	PNV	Amaiur EH Bildu	PSE–EE	PP	IU–UPeC	UPyD	Podemos	C's	Lead
2015 general election	20 Dec 2015	—N/a	69.0	24.7; 6	15.1; 2	13.2; 3	11.6; 2	2.9; 0	0.3; 0	26.0; 5	4.1; 0	1.3
TNS Demoscopia/RTVE–FORTA	20 Dec 2015	?	?	22.9; 4/5	18.2; 3/4	11.5; 1/2	8.9; 1/2	3.4; 0	0.7; 0	26.0; 5/6	5.9; 0	3.1
GIPEyOP	27 Nov–14 Dec 2015	249	?	24.4; 5/6	20.2; 4/5	16.1; 3/4	10.0; 1/2	3.7; 0	–	16.1; 2/3	6.9; 0/1	4.2
GAD3/ABC	16 Nov–11 Dec 2015	?	?	? 6	? 4	? 2	? 2	–	–	? 4	? 0	?
Sigma Dos/El Mundo	1–9 Dec 2015	?	?	23.0; 5	18.0; 3	14.0; 3	12.0; 2	–	–	22.0; 5	? 0	1.0
Redondo & Asociados	1–9 Dec 2015	?	?	26.6; 6	19.1; 4	12.1; 3	10.5; 2	–	–	12.0; 2	8.0; 1	7.5
NC Report/La Razón	13 Nov–5 Dec 2015	825	?	25.6; 6	21.3; 5	15.0; 2/3	12.6; 2	1.7; 0	0.9; 0	17.4; 2/3	2.9; 0	4.3
GAD3/ABC	10 Nov–3 Dec 2015	?	?	? 5	? 4	? 3	? 2	–	–	? 4	? 0	?
Redondo & Asociados	25 Nov–1 Dec 2015	?	?	25.0; 6	18.3; 4	14.6; 3	11.3; 2	–	–	11.5; 2	8.3; 1	6.7
Aztiker/Gara	16–28 Nov 2015	1,650	?	27.3; 6	19.1; 4	14.1; 2	9.8; 2	3.1; 0	0.2; 0	15.7; 4	8.2; 0	8.2
Gizaker/Grupo Noticias	14–18 Nov 2015	1,800	?	30.5; 6	20.4; 4	13.0; 2	9.7; 2	–	–	19.2; 4	3.7; 0	10.1
CIS	27 Oct–16 Nov 2015	1,283	?	? 5	? 5/6	? 1/2	? 2	–	–	? 4	? 0	?
Ikertalde/GPS	13–19 Oct 2015	2,520	68.5	27.4; 6	19.9; 4	14.6; 2	11.4; 2	2.2; 0	0.3; 0	17.7; 4	4.4; 0	7.5
2015 foral elections	24 May 2015	—N/a	63.8	33.3 (7)	22.4 (5)	13.6 (2)	9.3 (1)	2.7 (0)	0.5 (0)	13.7 (3)	2.1 (0)	10.9
2015 local elections	24 May 2015	—N/a	63.8	33.1	23.4	14.6	9.4	3.1	0.1	5.5	1.6	9.7
2014 EP election	25 May 2014	—N/a	43.1	27.5 (7)	23.4 (6)	13.8 (3)	10.2 (2)	5.6 (0)	3.3 (0)	6.9 (0)	0.8 (0)	4.1
Metroscopia/El País	30 Nov 2013	?	?	? 7	? 4	? 4	? 3	–	–	–	–	?
2012 regional election	21 Oct 2012	—N/a	64.0	34.2 (7)	24.7 (6)	18.9 (3)	11.6 (2)	2.7 (0)	1.9 (0)	–	–	9.5
NC Report/La Razón	1–17 Feb 2012	300	?	? 5	? 6	? 4	? 3	–	–	–	–	?
2011 general election	20 Nov 2011	—N/a	67.3	27.4; 5	24.1; 6	21.6; 4	17.8; 3	3.7; 0	1.8; 0	–	–	3.3

=== Canary Islands ===
Color key:

Exit poll

Polling firm/Commissioner	Fieldwork date	Sample size	Turnout	PP	PSOE	CC	IU–UPeC	UPyD	NCa	Podemos	C's	Lead
2015 general election	20 Dec 2015	—N/a	60.3	28.5; 5	22.0; 4	8.2; 1	3.1; 0	0.5; 0	(Note: Within PSOE.)	23.3; 3	11.4; 2	5.2
TNS Demoscopia/RTVE–FORTA	20 Dec 2015	?	?	27.9; 5/6	22.0; 4	6.0; 0/1	3.1; 0	0.5; 0		24.0; 3/4	12.4; 2	3.9
GIPEyOP	27 Nov–14 Dec 2015	185	?	16.5; 2/3	21.8; 3/4	14.3; 2/3	3.6; 0	–		26.0; 4/5	13.0; 1/2	4.2
Hamalgama Métrica/La Provincia	5–12 Dec 2015	1,600	?	24.5; 3/5	24.4; 4	6.9; 0/1	2.3; 0	0.6; 0		16.8; 2/3	22.4; 4	0.1
TSA/Canarias7	4–11 Dec 2015	1,802	?	21.9; 3/4	25.3; 4/5	9.6; 1	–	–		17.9; 2/3	19.8; 2/4	3.4
GAD3/ABC	16 Nov–11 Dec 2015	?	?	? 6	? 3	? 1	–	–		? 3	? 2	?
Sigma Dos/El Mundo	1–9 Dec 2015	?	?	32.0; 6	18.0; 3	8.0; 0/1	–	–		16.0; 2	21.0; 3/4	11.0
Redondo & Asociados	1–9 Dec 2015	?	?	27.2; 5	24.5; 5	11.5; 1	–	–		14.5; 2	16.6; 2	?
NC Report/La Razón	13 Nov–7 Dec 2015	600	?	24.3; 5	23.0; 4	8.4; 1	3.6; 0	0.8; 0		17.0; 2	20.9; 3	1.3
TSA/Canarias7	25 Nov–3 Dec 2015	1,800	?	21.5; 3/4	24.8; 5	8.5; 1	–	–		16.6; 2	20.9; 3/4	3.3
GAD3/ABC	10 Nov–3 Dec 2015	?	?	? 6	? 3	? 1	–	–		? 3	? 2	?
Redondo & Asociados	25 Nov–1 Dec 2015	?	?	27.9; 5	18.2; 4	12.9; 2	–	–		11.2; 2	16.1; 2	9.7
CIS	27 Oct–16 Nov 2015	731	?	? 6	? 3/4	? 1	–	–		? 2/3	? 2	?
2015 regional election	24 May 2015	—N/a	55.8	18.6 (3)	19.9 (4)	18.2 (4)	2.2 (0)	0.9 (0)	10.2 (2)	14.5 (2)	5.9 (0)	1.3
2014 EP election	25 May 2014	—N/a	35.0	23.4 (5)	22.2 (4)	12.2 (2)	10.5 (2)	6.9 (0)	–	11.0 (2)	1.4 (0)	1.2
Metroscopia/El País	30 Nov 2013	?	?	? 7	? 6	? 2	–	–	(Note: Within CC.)	–	–	?
NC Report/La Razón	1–17 Feb 2012	250	?	? 9	? 3/4	? 2/3	–	–		–	–	?
2011 general election	20 Nov 2011	—N/a	59.6	48.0; 9	24.9; 4	15.5; 2	4.3; 0	2.6; 0		–	–	23.1

=== Cantabria ===
Color key:

Exit poll

Polling firm/Commissioner	Fieldwork date	Sample size	Turnout	PP	PSOE	PRC	UPyD	IU–UPeC	Podemos	C's	Lead
2015 general election	20 Dec 2015	—N/a	71.0	36.9; 2	22.4; 1	–	0.8; 0	4.4; 0	17.9; 1	15.2; 1	14.5
TNS Demoscopia/RTVE–FORTA	20 Dec 2015	?	?	33.8; 2	22.2; 1	–	1.5; 0	5.5; 0	18.0; 1	16.1; 1	11.6
GIPEyOP	27 Nov–14 Dec 2015	94	?	33.7; 2/3	29.6; 2	–	–	8.2; 0	14.9; 0/1	10.7; 0	4.1
GAD3/ABC	16 Nov–11 Dec 2015	?	?	? 2/3	? 1	–	–	–	? 0	? 1/2	?
Sigma Dos/El Mundo	1–9 Dec 2015	?	?	33.0; 2	20.0; 1	–	–	4.0; 0	19.0; 1	23.0; 1	10.0
Redondo & Asociados	1–9 Dec 2015	?	?	38.1; 2	17.9; 1	–	–	–	14.2; 1	21.5; 1	16.6
NC Report/La Razón	13 Nov–5 Dec 2015	400	?	35.3; 2	25.7; 1/2	–	2.0; 0	3.2; 0	13.0; 0/1	18.8; 1	9.6
GAD3/ABC	10 Nov–3 Dec 2015	?	?	? 3	? 1	–	–	–	? 0	? 1	?
Redondo & Asociados	25 Nov–1 Dec 2015	?	?	37.5; 2	20.9; 1	–	–	–	13.1; 1	21.3; 1	16.2
CIS	27 Oct–16 Nov 2015	285	?	? 3	? 1	–	–	–	? 0	? 1	?
2015 regional election	24 May 2015	—N/a	66.2	32.6 (2)	14.0 (1)	29.9 (2)	0.7 (0)	2.5 (0)	8.9 (0)	6.9 (0)	2.7
2014 EP election	25 May 2014	—N/a	44.1	34.7 (3)	24.3 (2)	–	8.2 (0)	9.0 (0)	9.2 (0)	3.0 (0)	10.4
Metroscopia/El País	30 Nov 2013	?	?	? 3	? 2	–	–	–	–	–	?
NC Report/La Razón	1–17 Feb 2012	150	?	? 4	? 1	–	–	–	–	–	?
2011 general election	20 Nov 2011	—N/a	71.6	52.2; 4	25.2; 1	12.5; 0	3.6; 0	3.6; 0	–	–	27.0

=== Castile and León ===
Color key:

Exit poll

Polling firm/Commissioner	Fieldwork date	Sample size	Turnout	PP	PSOE	UPyD	IU–UPeC	Podemos	C's	Lead
2015 general election	20 Dec 2015	—N/a	71.2	39.1; 17	22.5; 9	0.9; 0	4.6; 0	15.1; 3	15.4; 3	16.6
TNS Demoscopia/RTVE–FORTA	20 Dec 2015	?	?	35.6; 15/17	20.6; 8/9	1.1; 0	4.9; 0	17.9; 4/5	16.4; 4/5	15.0
GIPEyOP	27 Nov–14 Dec 2015	389	?	34.6; 14/16	24.4; 8/10	–	3.5; 0	15.9; 3/4	16.2; 4/6	10.2
GAD3/ABC	16 Nov–11 Dec 2015	?	?	? 15	? 7	–	–	? 1	? 9	?
NC Report/La Razón	13 Nov–11 Dec 2015	2,350	?	38.1; 17	22.8; 9	0.3; 0	3.2; 0	15.2; 2	18.3; 4	15.3
Sigma Dos/El Mundo	1–9 Dec 2015	?	?	37.0; 16	18.0; 6/7	–	4.0; 0	15.0; 1/2	23.0; 8	14.0
Redondo & Asociados	1–9 Dec 2015	?	?	38.0; 16	18.8; 5	–	–	15.4; 2	22.8; 9	15.2
GAD3/ABC	10 Nov–3 Dec 2015	?	?	? 15/16	? 7	–	–	? 1	? 8/9	?
Redondo & Asociados	25 Nov–1 Dec 2015	?	?	37.4; 14	21.4; 7	–	–	14.3; 2	22.5; 9	14.9
CIS	27 Oct–16 Nov 2015	2,245	?	? 17/18	? 7/8	–	–	? 0	? 7	?
2015 regional election	24 May 2015	—N/a	64.9	37.7 (18)	25.9 (11)	1.4 (0)	4.1 (0)	12.1 (3)	10.3 (0)	11.8
2014 EP election	25 May 2014	—N/a	45.9	37.5 (21)	23.4 (11)	8.3 (0)	8.3 (0)	8.1 (0)	2.7 (0)	14.1
Metroscopia/El País	30 Nov 2013	?	?	? 18	? 13	? 1	–	–	–	?
NC Report/La Razón	1–17 Feb 2012	350	?	? 21	? 11	? 0	–	–	–	?
2011 general election	20 Nov 2011	—N/a	71.3	55.4; 21	29.2; 11	6.1; 0	5.6; 0	–	–	26.2

=== Castilla–La Mancha ===
Color key:

Exit poll

Polling firm/Commissioner	Fieldwork date	Sample size	Turnout	PP	PSOE	IU–UPeC	UPyD	Podemos	C's	Lead
2015 general election	20 Dec 2015	—N/a	75.3	38.1; 10	28.4; 7	3.6; 0	0.5; 0	13.7; 1	13.8; 3	9.7
TNS Demoscopia/RTVE–FORTA	20 Dec 2015	?	?	35.0; 9/10	26.6; 6/7	4.3; 0	0.9; 0	15.3; 2/3	15.4; 2/3	8.4
GIPEyOP	27 Nov–14 Dec 2015	548	?	33.7; 8/9	31.1; 7/9	3.7; 0	–	12.3; 1/2	16.1; 2/4	2.6
GAD3/ABC	16 Nov–11 Dec 2015	?	?	? 11	? 5	–	–	? 1	? 4	?
NC Report/La Razón	13 Nov–11 Dec 2015	925	?	38.1; 11	25.8; 5	3.3; 0	0.6; 0	14.7; 2	15.4; 3	12.3
Sigma Dos/El Mundo	1–9 Dec 2015	?	?	37.0; 10	21.0; 5	4.0; 0	–	13.0; 1	23.0; 5	14.0
Redondo & Asociados	1–9 Dec 2015	?	?	37.3; 10	19.8; 4	–	–	15.3; 2	22.2; 5	15.1
GAD3/ABC	10 Nov–3 Dec 2015	?	?	? 10	? 7	–	–	? 1	? 3	?
Redondo & Asociados	25 Nov–1 Dec 2015	?	?	36.5; 9	22.6; 5	–	–	14.0; 2	21.8; 5	13.9
JM&A/Periódico CLM	21 Nov 2015	?	?	36.1; 10	24.5; 7	4.2; 0	–	10.7; 0	19.4; 4	11.6
CIS	27 Oct–16 Nov 2015	1,229	?	? 10/11	? 5/6	–	–	? 0	? 5	?
2015 regional election	24 May 2015	—N/a	71.5	37.5 (11)	36.1 (10)	3.1 (0)	1.0 (0)	9.7 (0)	8.6 (0)	1.4
2014 EP election	25 May 2014	—N/a	46.4	37.7 (13)	28.8 (8)	8.7 (0)	7.2 (0)	6.4 (0)	2.2 (0)	8.9
Metroscopia/El País	30 Nov 2013	?	?	? 10	? 11	–	–	–	–	?
NC Report/La Razón	1–17 Feb 2012	300	?	? 14	? 7	–	–	–	–	?
2011 general election	20 Nov 2011	—N/a	75.8	55.8; 14	30.3; 7	5.8; 0	5.0; 0	–	–	25.5

=== Catalonia ===
Color key:

Exit poll

Polling firm/Commissioner	Fieldwork date	Sample size	Turnout	CiU	PSC	PP	ICV–EUiA	ERC–CatSí	UPyD	C's	CUP	Podemos	CDC DiL	unio.cat	En Comú Podem	JxSí	Lead
2015 general election	20 Dec 2015	—N/a	68.6	–	15.7; 8	11.1; 5	(Note: Within ECP.)	16.0; 9	0.2; 0	13.0; 5	–		15.1; 8	1.7; 0	24.7; 12	–	8.7
TNS Demoscopia/RTVE–FORTA	20 Dec 2015	?	?	–	15.4; 7/8	11.6; 5/6		16.4; 9/11	1.0; 0	15.5; 7/8	–		11.1; 6/7	2.0; 0	24.9; 12/13	–	8.5
GIPEyOP	27 Nov–14 Dec 2015	738	?	–	12.7; 4/6	8.6; 3/4		21.3; 12/13	–	18.3; 8/10	–		18.1; 9/10	–	15.8; 7/8	–	3.0
JM&A/Público	13 Dec 2015	?	?	–	15.2; 8	11.0; 4		14.6; 8	–	20.0; 9	–		15.9; 9	–	19.0; 9	–	1.0
GAD3/ABC	16 Nov–11 Dec 2015	?	?	–	? 8/9	? 4/6		? 8	–	? 7/8	–		? 9	–	? 9	–	Tie
Sigma Dos/El Mundo	1–9 Dec 2015	?	?	–	16.0; 7/8	11.0; 4		16.0; 9	–	18.0; 7/8	–		16.0; 9	–	20.0; 10	–	2.0
Redondo & Asociados	1–9 Dec 2015	?	?	–	18.8; 9	13.0; 5		14.0; 8	–	19.6; 10	–		13.2; 7	–	18.1; 8	–	0.8
NC Report/La Razón	13 Nov–9 Dec 2015	1,225	?	–	16.6; 8	9.9; 5		15.2; 8	0.2; 0	19.2; 9	–		14.8; 7	2.8; 0	19.1; 9	–	0.1
JM&A/Público	6 Dec 2015	?	?	–	15.3; 8	? 4		? 8	–	20.6; 9	–		? 10	–	17.6; 8	–	?
A+M/20minutos	26 Nov–4 Dec 2015	800	?	–	? 8/9	? 5		? 8/9	–	? 9	–		? 7/8	–	? 8/9	–	?
GAD3/ABC	10 Nov–3 Dec 2015	?	?	–	? 8	? 4/5		? 8	–	? 7/8	–		? 9	–	? 10	–	?
Redondo & Asociados	25 Nov–1 Dec 2015	?	?	–	19.4; 10	11.0; 5	4.5; 1	14.7; 8	–	19.0; 9	–	15.0; 7	13.9; 7	–	–	–	0.4
GESOP/El Periódico	23–28 Nov 2015	800	?	–	17.4; 8/9	8.8; 3/4		18.1; 9/11	–	18.4; 8/10	–		14.1; 7/8	–	19.4; 9/10	–	1.0
Feedback/La Vanguardia	20–27 Nov 2015	1,000	?	–	16.5; 9	11.8; 5		17.4; 9	–	17.7; 9	–		16.0; 9	2.3; 0	15.0; 6	–	0.3
GESOP/CEO	16–23 Nov 2015	1,050	75	–	16.2; 8/9	12.8; 5		17.9; 9/11	–	16.6; 8/9	–		17.5; 9/10	–	14.0; 5/6	–	0.4
JM&A/Público	19 Nov 2015	?	?	–	14.3; 8	9.7; 4		18.9; 11	–	19.5; 9	–		15.4; 8	–	17.1; 7	–	0.6
Metroscopia/El País	16–17 Nov 2015	800	73	–	18.4; 9	9.1; 3		16.0; 8	–	18.0; 9	–		14.5; 9	–	17.3; 9	–	0.4
CIS	27 Oct–16 Nov 2015	1,989	?	–	? 7/8	? 4		? 7	–	? 9	–		? 9	–	? 10/11	–	?
JM&A/Público	4 Nov 2015	?	?	–	13.0; 7	? 4	? 1	? 8	–	20.1; 10	–	? 4	20.4; 13	–	–	–	0.3
GAD3/ABC	14 Oct–4 Nov 2015	?	?	–	? 7	? 5	? 1	? 10	–	? 10	–	? 4	? 9	? 1	–	–	Tie
2015 regional election	27 Sep 2015	—N/a	74.9	–	12.7 (5)	8.5 (3)	(Note: Within CatSíqueesPot.)	(Note: Within JxSí.)	–	17.9 (8)	8.2 (2)			2.5 (0)	8.9 (3)	39.6 (26)	21.7
Metroscopia/El País	14–16 Sep 2015	2,000	74	–	17.7; 8	9.7; 4			–	12.7; 5	4.0; 1			–	21.5; 10	31.8; 19	10.3
Metroscopia/El País	14–16 Sep 2015	2,000	74	–	17.8; 8	9.7; 4		16.2; 8	–	12.7; 6	4.0; 1		15.8; 8	–	21.5; 12	–	3.7
Opinòmetre/CEO	9 Feb–2 Mar 2015	2,000	68	18.8; 12	10.8; 5/6	11.9; 5/6	3.7; 1	15.1; 8/9	–	7.9; 2/3	3.9; 1	21.2; 11/12	(Note: Within CiU.)		–	–	2.4
GESOP/El Periódico	20–26 Feb 2015	800	?	17.0; 10	11.3; 5/6	11.9; 6	3.6; 1	13.7; 7/8	–	15.7; 7	3.6; 1	20.5; 9			–	–	3.5
DYM/CEO	9–13 Dec 2014	1,100	70	18.8; 11/12	13.3; 6/7	10.7; 4/5	4.6; 1/2	17.5; 8/9	–	5.1; 2	2.7; 0	20.4; 10/11			–	–	1.6
GESOP/El Periódico	14–17 Nov 2014	800	?	17.3; 10	11.3; 5/6	11.8; 6/7	5.2; 1/2	15.4; 8/9	–	10.5; 4	3.0; 0/1	22.8; 10/12			–	–	5.5
Opinòmetre/CEO	29 Sep–23 Oct 2014	2,000	?	18.0; 10/12	15.0; 8/9	11.1; 5/6	5.1; 2	21.0; 12/13	–	2.5; 0/1	3.8; 1	14.0; 7/8			–	–	3.0
GESOP/El Periódico	16–18 Jun 2014	800	?	17.5; 9/10	11.5; 5/6	14.1; 8	7.9; 3	20.0; 12/13	–	9.3; 3	–	12.6; 5/6			–	–	2.5
2014 EP election	25 May 2014	—N/a	46.2	21.8 (14)	14.3 (6)	9.8 (4)	10.3 (4)	23.7 (15)	1.3 (0)	6.3 (2)	–	4.7 (2)			–	–	1.9
Feedback/La Vanguardia	30 Apr–8 May 2014	577	?	25.1; 13	19.5; 11	16.3; 9	11.3; 5	15.5; 7	–	6.5; 2	–	–			–	–	5.6
Opinòmetre/CEO	24 Mar–15 Apr 2014	2,000	65	22.7; 14/15	16.2; 8/9	12.5; 5/6	10.3; 4	19.1; 11/12	1.2; 0	6.6; 2/3	5.4; 1	–			–	–	1.6
GESOP/El Periódico	26–28 Feb 2014	800	?	22.5; 13	16.0; 8	13.9; 7/8	12.1; 4/5	17.9; 10/11	3.5; 1	5.7; 2	2.0; 0	–			–	–	4.6
Metroscopia/El País	30 Nov 2013	?	?	? 11	? 12	? 10	? 6	? 8	–	–	–	–			–	–	?
GESOP/CEO	4–14 Nov 2013	2,000	65	22.2; 13/14	17.0; 8/9	12.7; 7/8	9.0; 3	20.6; 11/12	–	9.2; 3/4	4.0; 0/1	–			–	–	1.6
Metroscopia/El País	28–30 Oct 2013	1,000	60	21.5; 14	17.8; 9	15.5; 9	12.1; 5	16.5; 8	–	6.4; 2	1.6; 0	–			–	–	3.7
GESOP/El Periódico	16–18 Oct 2013	800	?	22.0; 13/14	17.0; 8/9	12.7; 6	11.1; 4	19.6; 11/13	3.0; 0/1	6.5; 2	1.8; 0	–			–	–	2.4
Feedback/La Vanguardia	2–6 Sep 2013	300	?	23.1; 13	23.4; 12	15.7; 8	12.1; 5	14.3; 7	5.1; 2	–	–	–			–	–	0.3
GESOP/CEO	31 May–13 Jun 2013	2,000	65	23.5; 13/14	17.4; 9/10	12.5; 6/7	10.5; 4	18.8; 10/11	–	6.3; 2	4.1; 1	–			–	–	4.7
GESOP/El Periódico	28–31 May 2013	800	?	24.6; 14/15	18.7; 10/11	13.3; 6/7	12.7; 5	14.1; 8/9	2.9; 0/1	4.0; 1	–	–			–	–	5.9
GESOP/CEO	4–14 Feb 2013	2,000	65	27.3; 14/16	19.9; 10/12	13.2; 7/8	10.0; 4	14.9; 8/9	–	4.0; 1/2	3.7; 1	–			–	–	7.4
GESOP/El Periódico	14–16 Jan 2013	800	?	23.8; 14/15	21.0; 10/11	18.1; 10/11	9.1; 3/4	13.7; 7/8	–	–	–	–			–	–	2.8
2012 regional election	25 Nov 2012	—N/a	67.8	30.7 (20)	14.4 (7)	13.0 (5)	9.9 (4)	13.7 (7)	0.4 (0)	7.6 (3)	3.5 (1)	–			–	–	16.3
DYM/CEO	22–30 Oct 2012	2,500	68	32.9; 20	19.5; 11	17.6; 10	8.8; 3	7.5; 3	–	2.5; 1	–	–			–	–	13.4
Feedback/La Vanguardia	21–27 Sep 2012	1,200	?	37.1; 20	18.5; 9	18.2; 9	14.0; 5	8.1; 4	–	–	–	–			–	–	18.6
DYM/CEO	4–18 Jun 2012	2,500	70.6	31.0; 18/19	24.3; 13	16.4; 8	10.0; 4	8.5; 3/4	–	–	–	–			–	–	6.7
GESOP/El Periódico	7–9 May 2012	800	?	27.0; 15/16	28.0; 15/16	17.0; 9/10	8.0; 3	9.0; 3/4	–	–	–	–			–	–	1.0
DYM/CEO	6–21 Feb 2012	2,500	?	30.2; 17/18	25.9; 12/13	19.8; 10/11	8.8; 3	7.3; 3	–	–	–	–			–	–	4.3
NC Report/La Razón	1–17 Feb 2012	350	?	? 15/16	? 13	? 11/12	? 4	? 3	–	–	–	–			–	–	?
GESOP/El Periódico	16–19 Jan 2012	800	?	24.7; 15/16	26.5; 14/15	22.4; 11/12	8.1; 3	7.4; 2/3	–	–	–	–			–	–	1.8
2011 general election	20 Nov 2011	—N/a	65.2	29.3; 16	26.7; 14	20.7; 11	8.1; 3	7.1; 3	1.1; 0	–	–	–			–	–	2.6

=== Extremadura ===
Color key:

Exit poll

Polling firm/Commissioner	Fieldwork date	Sample size	Turnout	PP	PSOE	IU–UPeC	UPyD	Podemos	C's	Lead
2015 general election	20 Dec 2015	—N/a	72.2	34.8; 4	36.0; 5	3.0; 0	0.4; 0	12.7; 1	11.4; 0	1.2
TNS Demoscopia/RTVE–FORTA	20 Dec 2015	?	?	32.8; 4/5	35.2; 4/5	4.7; 0	0.5; 0	13.1; 0/1	10.9; 0/1	2.4
GIPEyOP	27 Nov–14 Dec 2015	119	?	36.1; 4/5	32.7; 4/5	4.4; 0	–	13.9; 1	10.3; 0/1	3.4
GAD3/ABC	16 Nov–11 Dec 2015	?	?	? 4	? 5	–	–	? 0	? 1	?
Sigma Dos/El Mundo	1–9 Dec 2015	?	?	38.0; 5	29.0; 4	5.0; 0	–	11.0; 0	16.0; 1	9.0
Redondo & Asociados	1–9 Dec 2015	?	?	30.1; 4	31.5; 4	–	–	16.9; 1	17.5; 1	1.4
NC Report/La Razón	13 Nov–7 Dec 2015	575	?	31.9; 4	32.2; 4	4.2; 0	0.4; 0	11.6; 0	17.5; 2	0.3
GAD3/ABC	10 Nov–3 Dec 2015	?	?	? 4	? 5	–	–	? 0	? 1	?
Redondo & Asociados	25 Nov–1 Dec 2015	?	?	32.4; 4	26.4; 3	–	–	17.0; 1	20.3; 2	6.0
CIS	27 Oct–16 Nov 2015	510	?	? 4	? 5	–	–	? 0	? 1	?
2015 regional election	24 May 2015	—N/a	71.4	37.0 (5)	41.5 (5)	4.2 (0)	0.6 (0)	8.0 (0)	4.4 (0)	4.5
2014 EP election	25 May 2014	—N/a	44.1	35.6 (5)	38.7 (5)	6.3 (0)	5.5 (0)	4.8 (0)	1.0 (0)	3.1
Metroscopia/El País	30 Nov 2013	?	?	? 5	? 5	–	–	–	–	Tie
Celeste-Tel/El Periódico	3–7 Sep 2012	1,100	?	40.0; 5	42.3; 5	8.3; 0	6.7; 0	–	–	2.3
NC Report/La Razón	1–17 Feb 2012	200	?	? 6	? 4	–	–	–	–	?
2011 general election	20 Nov 2011	—N/a	73.9	51.2; 6	37.2; 4	5.7; 0	3.5; 0	–	–	14.0

=== Galicia ===
Color key:

Exit poll

Polling firm/Commissioner	Fieldwork date	Sample size	Turnout	PP	PSdeG–PSOE	Nós	IU–UPeC	UPyD	AGE	Podemos	C's	En Marea	Lead
2015 general election	20 Dec 2015	—N/a	61.5	37.1; 10	21.3; 6	4.3; 0	(Note: Within En Marea.)	0.5; 0			9.1; 1	25.0; 6	12.1
TNS Demoscopia/RTVE–FORTA	20 Dec 2015	?	?	34.5; 9/10	19.3; 4/5	5.3; 0		0.6; 0			10.7; 1/2	27.0; 7/8	7.5
GIPEyOP	27 Nov–14 Dec 2015	400	?	34.5; 10/11	12.9; 2/3	7.8; 0		–			14.5; 2/3	26.1; 6/7	8.4
GAD3/ABC	16 Nov–11 Dec 2015	?	?	? 11/12	? 5/6	? 0		–			? 2	? 3/5	?
NC Report/La Razón	13 Nov–10 Dec 2015	1,000	?	35.5; 10/11	21.3; 6	7.0; 0		–			11.4; 2	18.3; 4/5	14.2
Sondaxe/La Voz de Galicia	1–9 Dec 2015	1,700	?	38.1; 11	17.4; 4	? 0		–			16.4; 2	20.6; 6	17.5
Sigma Dos/El Mundo	1–9 Dec 2015	?	?	36.0; 9	21.0; 6	3.0; 0		–			15.0; 2	20.0; 6	15.0
Redondo & Asociados	1–9 Dec 2015	?	?	39.6; 11	19.2; 5	? 0		–			18.8; 5	16.0; 2	20.4
Infortécnica	16 Nov–9 Dec 2015	2,114	?	? 10/12	? 4/5	? 0		–			? 2	? 4/6	?
GAD3/ABC	10 Nov–3 Dec 2015	?	?	? 11	? 6	? 0		–			? 2	? 4	?
Redondo & Asociados	25 Nov–1 Dec 2015	?	?	36.9; 10	21.2; 6	? 0		–			19.6; 5	12.1; 2	15.7
CIS	27 Oct–16 Nov 2015	1,296	?	? 10	? 5/6	? 0		–			? 2	? 5/6	?
Sondaxe/La Voz de Galicia	17–23 Oct 2014	500	56.0	43.0	23.0	5.7	(Note: Within AGE.)	–	3.5	20.7	–	–	20.0
2014 EP election	25 May 2014	—N/a	38.7	35.2 (13)	21.8 (6)	7.9 (0)		3.3 (0)	10.5 (2)	8.4 (2)	1.6 (0)	–	13.4
Metroscopia/El País	30 Nov 2013	?	?	? 11	? 11	? 1	–	–	–	–	–	–	Tie
2012 regional election	21 Oct 2012	—N/a	54.9	45.8 (14)	20.6 (5)	10.1 (2)		1.5 (0)	13.9 (2)	–	–	–	25.2
NC Report/La Razón	1–17 Feb 2012	300	?	? 15	? 6	? 2	–	–	–	–	–	–	?
2011 general election	20 Nov 2011	—N/a	62.2	52.5; 15	27.8; 6	11.2; 2	4.1; 0	1.2; 0	–	–	–	–	24.7

=== La Rioja ===
Color key:

Exit poll

Polling firm/Commissioner	Fieldwork date	Sample size	Turnout	PP	PSOE	UPyD	IU–UPeC	Podemos	C's	Lead
2015 general election	20 Dec 2015	—N/a	72.4	38.3; 2	23.7; 1	0.8; 0	4.2; 0	15.8; 1	15.1; 0	14.6
TNS Demoscopia/RTVE–FORTA	20 Dec 2015	?	?	34.6; 1/2	21.6; 1	0.6; 0	4.5; 0	20.0; 1	15.9; 0/1	13.0
GIPEyOP	27 Nov–14 Dec 2015	175	?	30.3; 1/2	24.2; 1	–	3.4; 0	13.5; 0/1	22.3; 1	6.1
GAD3/ABC	16 Nov–11 Dec 2015	?	?	? 2	? 1	–	–	? 0	? 1	?
Sigma Dos/El Mundo	1–9 Dec 2015	?	?	39.0; 2	21.0; 1	–	4.0; 0	11.0; 0	22.0; 1	17.0
Redondo & Asociados	1–9 Dec 2015	?	?	37.9; 2	19.4; 1	–	–	? 0	22.9; 1	15.0
NC Report/La Razón	13 Nov–7 Dec 2015	400	?	37.1; 2	25.1; 1	0.3; 0	3.2; 0	12.8; 0	18.3; 1	12.0
GAD3/ABC	10 Nov–3 Dec 2015	?	?	? 2	? 1	–	–	? 0	? 1	?
Metroscopia/El País	30 Nov–2 Dec 2015	400	77	33.6; 2	24.1; 1	–	4.5; 0	12.8; 0	20.8; 1	9.5
Redondo & Asociados	25 Nov–1 Dec 2015	?	?	37.1; 2	22.5; 1	–	–	? 0	22.5; 1	14.6
CIS	27 Oct–16 Nov 2015	252	?	? 2	? 1	–	–	? 0	? 1	?
2015 regional election	24 May 2015	—N/a	67.3	38.6 (2)	26.7 (2)	1.2 (0)	4.2 (0)	11.2 (0)	10.4 (0)	11.9
2014 EP election	25 May 2014	—N/a	47.5	38.4 (3)	23.7 (1)	9.0 (0)	8.1 (0)	7.5 (0)	2.3 (0)	14.7
Metroscopia/El País	30 Nov 2013	?	?	? 2	? 2	–	–	–	–	Tie
NC Report/La Razón	1–17 Feb 2012	150	?	? 3	? 1	–	–	–	–	?
2011 general election	20 Nov 2011	—N/a	72.8	54.7; 3	31.1; 1	6.0; 0	4.6; 0	–	–	23.6

=== Madrid ===
Color key:

Exit poll

Polling firm/Commissioner	Fieldwork date	Sample size	Turnout	PP	PSOE	UPyD	IU–UPeC	Podemos	C's	Vox	Lead
2015 general election	20 Dec 2015	—N/a	74.1	33.4; 13	17.8; 6	1.2; 0	5.3; 2	20.9; 8	18.8; 7	0.6; 0	12.5
TNS Demoscopia/RTVE–FORTA	20 Dec 2015	?	?	30.4; 11/13	16.1; 6/7	2.1; 0	6.3; 2	23.5; 9/10	18.7; 6/7	–	6.9
GIPEyOP	27 Nov–14 Dec 2015	1,593	?	27.5; 10/11	22.0; 8/9	–	4.6; 1/2	19.5; 7/8	21.6; 8/9	–	5.5
TNS Demoscopia/Europa Press	9–12 Dec 2015	700	?	34.2; 13	16.1; 6	2.5; 0/1	4.6; 1	18.0; 7	22.5; 8/9	–	11.7
GAD3/ABC	16 Nov–11 Dec 2015	?	?	? 12/13	? 7	–	? 1	? 8	? 7/8	–	?
NC Report/La Razón	13 Nov–11 Dec 2015	600	?	33.4; 13	20.1; 7	0.3; 0	4.4; 1	20.4; 8	18.9; 7	–	13.0
Sigma Dos/El Mundo	1–9 Dec 2015	?	?	29.0; 11/12	18.0; 7	–	5.0; 1	22.0; 8	23.0; 8/9	–	6.0
Redondo & Asociados	1–9 Dec 2015	?	?	34.1; 13	17.3; 7	–	4.7; 1	16.7; 6	23.8; 9	–	10.3
JM&A/Público	6 Dec 2015	?	?	27.0; 11	16.5; 6	–	? 1	19.0; 7	28.1; 11	–	1.1
A+M/20minutos	4 Dec 2015	700	?	? 10/11	? 6/7	–	? 2	? 8	? 9	–	?
GAD3/ABC	10 Nov–3 Dec 2015	?	?	? 13	? 6/7	–	? 1	? 7/8	? 8	–	?
Redondo & Asociados	25 Nov–1 Dec 2015	?	?	33.8; 13	20.0; 7	–	4.7; 1	15.5; 6	23.6; 9	–	10.2
Metroscopia/El País	25–26 Nov 2015	600	78	27.3; 11	18.7; 7	–	5.1; 1/2	19.5; 7	24.8; 9/10	–	2.5
JM&A/Público	19 Nov 2015	?	?	27.8; 11	? 7	–	? 1	? 7	26.4; 10	–	1.4
CIS	27 Oct–16 Nov 2015	791	?	? 13/14	? 5	–	? 1	? 6/7	? 10	–	?
GAD3/ABC	14–29 Oct 2015	?	?	? 12	? 8/9	–	? 2	? 6	? 7/8	–	?
2015 regional election	24 May 2015	—N/a	65.7	33.1 (13)	25.4 (10)	2.0 (0)	4.2 (1)	18.6 (7)	12.2 (5)	1.2 (0)	7.7
2014 EP election	25 May 2014	—N/a	46.5	30.0 (13)	19.0 (8)	10.6 (4)	10.6 (4)	11.4 (4)	4.8 (2)	3.7 (1)	11.0
Metroscopia/El País	30 Nov 2013	?	?	? 14	? 10	? 7	? 5	–	–	–	?
NC Report/La Razón	1–17 Feb 2012	350	?	? 19	? 9/10	? 4/5	? 3/4	–	–	–	?
2011 general election	20 Nov 2011	—N/a	73.3	51.0; 19	26.0; 10	10.3; 4	8.0; 3	–	–	–	25.0

=== Murcia ===
Color key:

Exit poll

Polling firm/Commissioner	Fieldwork date	Sample size	Turnout	PP	PSOE	UPyD	IU–UPeC	Podemos	C's	Lead
2015 general election	20 Dec 2015	—N/a	71.1	40.4; 5	20.3; 2	0.7; 0	3.1; 0	15.2; 1	17.7; 2	20.1
TNS Demoscopia/RTVE–FORTA	20 Dec 2015	?	?	38.1; 4/5	17.9; 2	1.0; 0	4.2; 0	15.4; 1/2	19.7; 2	18.4
GIPEyOP	27 Nov–14 Dec 2015	271	?	38.6; 4/5	18.1; 2	–	4.9; 0	20.7; 2	14.6; 1/2	18.1
GAD3/ABC	16 Nov–11 Dec 2015	?	?	? 5	? 2	–	–	? 1	? 2	?
Celeste-Tel/PSOE	2–9 Dec 2015	1,000	77.2	36.3; 4	24.3; 3	4.0; 0	3.9; 0	14.0; 1	16.5; 2	12.0
Sigma Dos/El Mundo	1–9 Dec 2015	?	?	36.0; 4	19.0; 2	–	2.0; 0	18.0; 2	23.0; 2	13.0
Redondo & Asociados	1–9 Dec 2015	?	?	44.1; 5	14.0; 1	–	–	12.9; 1	23.6; 3	20.5
NC Report/La Razón	13 Nov–7 Dec 2015	400	?	40.6; 5	18.6; 2	0.2; 0	4.0; 0	13.4; 1	19.9; 2	20.7
GAD3/ABC	10 Nov–3 Dec 2015	?	?	? 5	? 2	–	–	? 1	? 2	?
Redondo & Asociados	25 Nov–1 Dec 2015	?	?	43.5; 5	16.4; 2	–	–	12.0; 1	23.3; 2	20.2
Sigma Dos/La7 TV	17–18 Nov 2015	700	?	38.3; 5	17.3; 2	–	3.4; 0	13.6; 1	22.8; 2	15.5
CIS	27 Oct–16 Nov 2015	413	?	? 5	? 2	–	–	? 1	? 2	?
2015 regional election	24 May 2015	—N/a	63.6	37.4 (5)	23.9 (3)	1.6 (0)	4.8 (0)	13.2 (1)	12.6 (1)	13.5
2014 EP election	25 May 2014	—N/a	42.5	37.5 (5)	20.7 (2)	9.5 (1)	9.8 (1)	7.6 (1)	3.6 (0)	16.8
Metroscopia/El País	30 Nov 2013	?	?	? 6	? 4	–	–	–	–	?
NC Report/La Razón	1–17 Feb 2012	200	?	? 8	? 2	–	–	–	–	?
2011 general election	20 Nov 2011	—N/a	74.1	64.2; 8	21.0; 2	6.3; 0	5.7; 0	–	–	43.2

=== Navarre ===
Color key:

Exit poll

Polling firm/Commissioner	Fieldwork date	Sample size	Turnout	PP	PSOE	Amaiur EH Bildu	GBai	I–E	UPyD	UPN	Podemos	C's	Lead
2015 general election	20 Dec 2015	—N/a	70.9	28.9; 2	15.5; 1	9.9; 0	8.7; 0	4.1; 0	0.4; 0		23.0; 2	7.1; 0	5.9
TNS Demoscopia/RTVE–FORTA	20 Dec 2015	?	?	26.5; 2	15.0; 1	10.0; 0/1	10.9; 0/1	4.8; 0	0.3; 0		22.0; 1/2	7.8; 0	4.5
GIPEyOP	27 Nov–14 Dec 2015	120	?	30.8; 2	14.6; 0/1	18.1; 1	15.0; 1	3.4; 0	–		10.6; 0/1	6.9; 0	12.7
GAD3/ABC	16 Nov–11 Dec 2015	?	?	? 2	? 1	? 1	? 0	–	–		? 1	? 0	?
NC Report/La Razón	13 Nov–10 Dec 2015	400	?	28.4; 2	16.2; 1	12.7; 1	11.9; 0	3.5; 0	0.2; 0		17.1; 1	7.8; 0	11.3
Redondo & Asociados	1–9 Dec 2015	?	?	24.4; 2	14.7; 1	? 0	? 0	–	–		14.2; 1	13.8; 1	9.7
CIES/Diario de Navarra	26 Nov–4 Dec 2015	800	76	25.2; 1/2	13.5; 1	12.6; 1	12.3; 0/1	6.8; 0	–		15.3; 1	11.7; 0	9.9
GAD3/ABC	10 Nov–3 Dec 2015	?	?	? 2	? 1	? 1	? 0	–	–		? 1	? 0	?
Redondo & Asociados	25 Nov–1 Dec 2015	?	?	22.8; 2	14.0; 1	? 0	12.6; 1	–	–		? 0	13.9; 1	8.8
Aztiker/Gara	16–28 Nov 2015	600	?	27.5; 2	16.1; 1	13.2; 1	12.1; 0	3.3; 0	0.4; 0		14.3; 1	11.0; 0	11.4
CIES/NaTV	27 Nov 2015	?	?	28.6; 2	14.8; 1	12.9; 0	15.7; 1	–	–		14.3; 1	–	12.9
Gizaker/Grupo Noticias	26–27 Nov 2015	800	69.4	29.2; 2	12.2; 0/1	12.5; 0/1	12.9; 0/1	5.4; 0	–		15.9; 1	8.4; 0	13.3
CIS	27 Oct–16 Nov 2015	427	?	? 2	? 1	? 1	? 0	–	–		? 1	? 0	?
2015 regional election	24 May 2015	—N/a	68.3	3.9 (0)	13.4 (0)	14.3 (1)	15.8 (1)	3.7 (0)	0.5 (0)	27.4 (2)	13.7 (1)	3.0 (0)	11.6
2014 EP election	25 May 2014	—N/a	44.5	25.1 (2)	14.5 (1)	20.2 (2)	2.5 (0)	9.5 (0)	4.6 (0)	–	9.3 (0)	1.8 (0)	4.9
Metroscopia/El País	30 Nov 2013	?	?	? 2	? 1	? 1	? 1	–	–		–	–	?
NC Report/La Razón	1–17 Feb 2012	200	?	? 2	? 1	? 1	? 1	–	–		–	–	?
2011 general election	20 Nov 2011	—N/a	68.9	38.2; 2	22.0; 1	14.9; 1	12.8; 1	5.5; 0	2.1; 0		–	–	16.2

=== Valencian Community ===
Color key:

Exit poll

Polling firm/Commissioner	Fieldwork date	Sample size	Turnout	PP	PSOE	IU–UPeC	UPyD	Compromís	Podemos	C's	És el moment	Lead
2015 general election	20 Dec 2015	—N/a	74.8	31.3; 11	19.8; 7	4.2; 0	0.6; 0	(Note: Within És el moment.)		15.8; 5	25.1; 9	6.2
TNS Demoscopia/RTVE–FORTA	20 Dec 2015	?	?	30.3; 11/12	18.5; 6/7	4.6; 0/1	1.0; 0			17.0; 5/6	25.5; 9/10	4.8
GIPEyOP	27 Nov–14 Dec 2015	7,531	?	25.4; 9/10	20.0; 6/7	5.2; 1	–			17.9; 5/7	26.2; 8/10	0.8
GAD3/ABC	16 Nov–11 Dec 2015	?	?	? 11	? 7	? 0	–			? 6	? 7	?
NC Report/La Razón	13 Nov–11 Dec 2015	925	?	32.9; 13	21.0; 7	4.1; 0	0.4; 0			19.6; 6	20.4; 6	11.9
Sigma Dos/El Mundo	1–9 Dec 2015	?	?	28.0; 10/12	22.0; 7	7.0; 1	–			20.0; 6/7	20.0; 6/7	6.0
Redondo & Asociados	1–9 Dec 2015	?	?	28.5; 11	20.5; 7	? 0	–			25.1; 8	18.0; 6	3.4
GAD3/ABC	10 Nov–3 Dec 2015	?	?	? 11	? 6/7	? 0/1	–			? 7	? 7	?
Redondo & Asociados	25 Nov–1 Dec 2015	?	?	28.9; 10	23.6; 8	? 0	–			24.4; 8	16.3; 6	4.5
PP	29 Nov 2015	?	?	26.7– 28.4; 10/11	20.8– 22.5; 7	? 0	–			22.8– 24.5; 8/9	19.8– 21.5; 6	3.9
ODEC/PSPV	23 Nov 2015	2,950	?	25.6; 9	23.3; 9	4.9; 0/1	–			20.9; 7	19.7; 6/7	2.3
CIS	27 Oct–16 Nov 2015	1,242	?	? 10/12	? 6/7	? 0/1	–			? 7	? 7	?
GAD3/ABC	14–29 Oct 2015	?	?	? 11	? 9	? 0	–	? 2	? 3	? 7	–	?
Metroscopia/El País	5–7 Oct 2015	1,273	80	21.6; 8	23.3; 8/9	5.6; 1	0.1; 0	7.3; 1	15.6; 5	25.4; 9/10	–	2.1
Invest Group/Levante-EMV	28 Sep–2 Oct 2015	1,100	?	28.0; 10/11	27.4; 9/10	4.5; 1	–	7.9; 1/2	11.3; 4	18.2; 6/7	–	0.6
2015 regional election	24 May 2015	—N/a	69.6	26.6 (11)	20.6 (8)	4.3 (0)	1.2 (0)	18.4 (7)	11.4 (3)	12.5 (4)	–	6.0
JM&A/El Mundo	17 May 2015	?	?	27.2; 11	20.3; 7	3.3; 0	? 0	6.1; 1	18.5; 6	20.2; 7	–	6.9
Sigma Dos/Mediaset	9–12 Feb 2015	?	?	31.2	17.5	5.1	2.9	5.0	26.7	5.8	–	4.5
2014 EP election	25 May 2014	—N/a	49.1	29.0 (14)	21.6 (10)	10.6 (3)	8.5 (2)	7.9 (2)	8.2 (2)	2.9 (0)	–	7.4
Metroscopia/El País	30 Nov 2013	?	?	? 15	? 11	? 3	? 2	? 2	–	–	–	?
ODEC/PSPV	17 Nov 2012	3,520	?	40.8	27.5	10.8	6.7	6.9	–	–	–	13.3
NC Report/La Razón	1–17 Feb 2012	300	?	? 20	? 8/9	? 1/2	? 1	? 1/2	–	–	–	?
2011 general election	20 Nov 2011	—N/a	74.2	53.3; 20	26.8; 10	6.5; 1	5.6; 1	4.8; 1	–	–	–	26.5

== See also ==
- Opinion polling for the 2015 Spanish general election
