= Composition of the Spanish autonomous parliaments =

Autonomous Parliament is the usual colloquial name given in Spain to the legislative power in each autonomous community. The autonomous cities of Ceuta and Melilla have assemblies without their own legislative capacity. The name in each community is established by the respective statutes of autonomy and depending on the community, the autonomous parliament is known as an assembly, courts or parliament. The 1978 Spanish Constitution refers to them as "assemblies" or "legislative assemblies" (for example, in article 152).

Title VIII of the Spanish Constitution regulates the executive, legislative and judicial powers in each community. Although the judicial system is not specific to the community, it is unique for all of Spain.

In some autonomous communities, other subnational parliaments at a higher level than the municipality but lower than the autonomous community exist, such as the General Meetings of the Basque Country, the island Councils of the Balearic Islands, the Insular cabildos of the Canary Islands or the General Council of Aran. However, this parliaments are not considered as autonomous parliaments.

== Composition of the autonomous parliaments ==
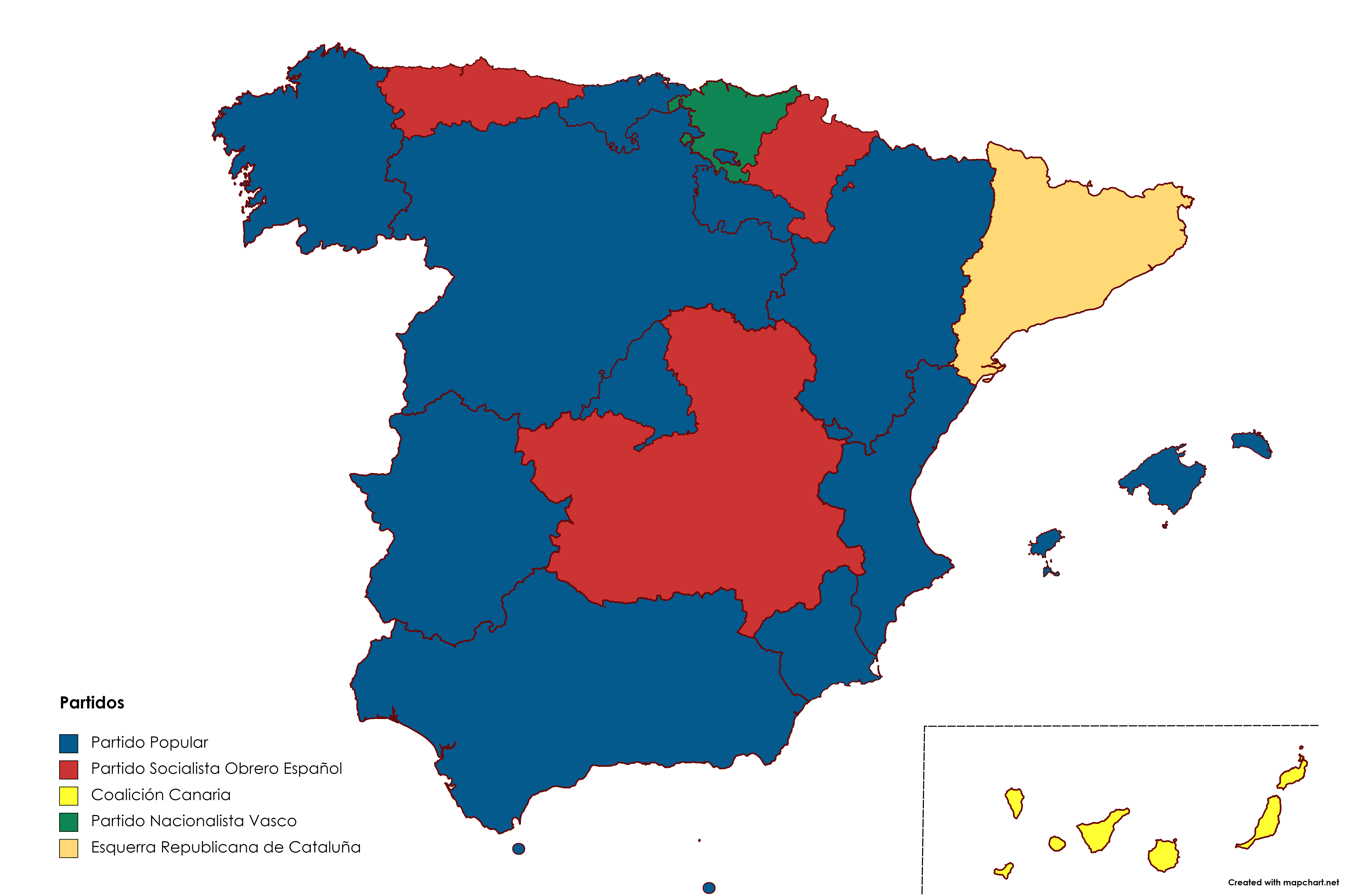
Composition of the Spanish autonomous communities' governing party

In the table below, the parties forming part of the state government are shaded and the party that won the most votes in the last election is also in bold.

Autonomous Parliament	Seats (Majority)	PP	PSOE	Vox	Sumar	IU	Podemos	Other parties	Last election	Next election
Parliament of Andalusia	**109** (55)	**58**	30	14	1 (Note: (Por Andalucía))	1 (Note: (Por Andalucía))	3 (Note: (Por Andalucía))	2 (Anticapitalistas)	2022	2026
Cortes of Aragon	**67** (34)	**26**	18	14	-	1	-	6 (CHA) 2 (Existe)	2026	2030
General Junta of the Principality of Asturias	**45** (23)	17	**19**	4	1 (Note: (CxAst))	2 (Note: (CxAst))	1	1 (FAC)	2023	2027
Parliament of the Balearic Islands	**59** (30)	**25**	18	8	-	-	1 (Note: (United we can))	1 (Sa Unió) 4 (Més) 2 (MxMe)	2023	2027
Parliament of the Canary Islands	**70** (35)	15	**23**	4	-	-	-	19 (CCa) (Note: in government) 1 (AHI) (Note: in government) 3 (ASG) (Note: in government) 5 (NC)	2023	2027
Parliament of Cantabria	**35** (18)	**15**	8	4	-	-	-	8 (PRC)	2023	2027
Cortes of Castilla-La Mancha	**33** (12)	12	**17**	4	-	-	-	-	2023	2027
Cortes of Castile and León	**81** (41)	**33**	30	14	-	-	-	3 (UPL) 1 (SY) 1 (XAV)	2026	2030
Parliament of Catalonia	**135** (68)	15	**42**	11	6	-	-	35 (JxCat) 20 (ERC) 4 (CUP) 2 (AC)	2024	2028
Corts Valencianes	**99** (50)	**40**	31	13	-	-	-	15 (Compromís)	2023	2027
Assembly of Extremadura	**65** (33)	**29**	18	11	-	4	3	-	2025	2030
Parliament of Galicia	**75** (38)	**40**	9	-	-	-	-	25 (BNG) 1 (DO)	2024	2028
Parliament of La Rioja	**33** (12)	**17**	12	2	-	1 (Note: (United we Can))	1 (Note: (United we Can))	-	2023	2027
Assembly of Madrid	**135** (68)	**70**	27	11	27	-	-	-	2023	2027
Regional Assembly of Murcia	**45** (23)	**21**	13	9	-	1	1	-	2023	2027
Parliament of Navarre	**50** (25)	3	11	2	-	1 (Note: (Contigo Zurekin))	2 (Note: (Contigo Zurekin))	5 (GSB/GSV) (Note: (Geroa Bai)) (Note: in government) 2 (EAJ/PNV) (Note: (Geroa Bai)) (Note: in government) 15 (UPN) 9 (EH Bildu)	2023	2027
Basque Parliament	**75** (38)	7	12	1	-	1 (Note: (Sumar))	-	**27** (EAJ/PNV) (Note: in government) 27 (EH Bildu) (Note: 4 (Sortu), 4 (Alternatiba) and 2 (EA))	2024	2028
Assembly of Ceuta	**25** (13)	**9**	6	5	-	-	-	3 (MDyC) 2 (CY!)	2023	2027
Assembly of Melilla	**25** (13)	**14**	3	2	-	-	-	5 (CpM) 1 (SML)	2023	2027
Total	1261	465	360	160	29	10	13	257		

== Other subnational parliaments ==
The following table contains the composition of the General Council of Aran, the General Meetings of the Basque Country, the cabildos and the Island councils. Although they are not considered as autonomous parlamients because they are subordinated to their respectives autonomous governments, these are elected bodies with their own governments.

=== General Council of Aran ===
General Council of Aran
Parties and alliances	Seats
Unity of Aran–Socialists' Party of Catalonia (UA–PSC)	9
Aranese Democratic Convergence-Aranese Nationalist Party (CDA–PNA)	4

=== General Assemblies of the Basque Country ===
General Assembly of Guipuzkoa
Parties and alliances	Seats
Euskal Herria Bildu (EH Bildu)	22
Basque Nationalist Party (EAJ-PNV)	17
Spanish Socialist Workers' Party (PSOE)	7
People's Party (PP)	3
Elkarrekin Podemos (Elkarrekin)	2

General Assembly of Biscay
Parties and alliances	Seats
Basque Nationalist Party (EAJ-PNV)	23
Euskal Herria Bildu (EH Bildu)	15
Spanish Socialist Workers' Party (PSOE)	8
People's Party (PP)	3
Elkarrekin Podemos (Elkarrekin)	2

General Assembly of Álava
Parties and alliances	Seats
Basque Nationalist Party (EAJ-PNV)	15
Euskal Herria Bildu (EH Bildu)	14
Spanish Socialist Workers' Party (PSOE)	9
People's Party (PP)	9
Elkarrekin Podemos (Elkarrekin)	3
Vox (Vox)	3

=== Island Councils ===
Island Council of Mallorca
Parties and alliances	Seats
People's Party (PP)	13
Spanish Socialist Workers' Party (PSOE)	9
Vox (Vox)	5
Més per Mallorca (Més)	4
Proposta per les Illes (El Pi)	2

Island Council of Menorca
Parties and alliances	Seats
People's Party (PP)	6
Spanish Socialist Workers' Party (PSOE)	4
Més per Menorca (MxMe)	2
Vox (Vox)	1

Island Council of Ibiza
Parties and alliances	Seats
People's Party (PP)	8
Spanish Socialist Workers' Party (PSOE)	3
Vox (Vox)	1
Unidas Podemos (EUIB-Podemos)	1

Island Council of Formentera
Parties and alliances	Seats
Sa Unió de Formentera (Sa Unió)	9
Gent per Formentera (GxF)	5
Spanish Socialist Workers' Party (PSOE)	3

=== Cabildos Insulares ===
Cabildo Insular de Tenerife
Parties and alliances	Seats
Spanish Socialist Workers' Party (PSOE)	11
Canarian Coalition (CC)	10
People's Party (PP)	8
Vox (Vox)	2

Cabildo Insular de Gran Canaria
Parties and alliances	Seats
New Canaries (NC)	8
Spanish Socialist Workers' Party (PSOE)	8
People's Party (PP)	7
Canarian Coalition (CC)	3
Vox (Vox)	3

Cabildo Insular de Lanzarote y La Graciosa
Parties and alliances	Seats
Canarian Coalition (CC)	8
Spanish Socialist Workers' Party (PSOE)	8
People's Party (PP)	4
New Canaries (NC)	2
Vox (Vox)	1

Cabildo Insular de Fuerteventura
Parties and alliances	Seats
Canarian Coalition (CC)	8
Spanish Socialist Workers' Party (PSOE)	5
People's Party (PP)	5
New Canaries (NC)	3
Municipal Assemblies of Fuerteventura (AMF)	2

Cabildo Insular de La Palma
Parties and alliances	Seats
Canarian Coalition (CC)	11
Spanish Socialist Workers' Party (PSOE)	5
People's Party (PP)	5

Cabildo Insular de La Gomera
Parties and alliances	Seats
Gomera Socialist Group (ASG)	11
Spanish Socialist Workers' Party (PSOE)	3
Iniciative for La Gomera (IxLG)	2
Canarian Coalition (CC)	1

Cabildo Insular de El Hierro
Parties and alliances	Seats
Independent Herrenian Group (AHI)	4
Spanish Socialist Workers' Party (PSOE)	3
Herrenian Assembly (Asamblea Herreña)	3
People's Party (PP)	1
United Left (IUC)	1

== Diagrams ==
Andalusia

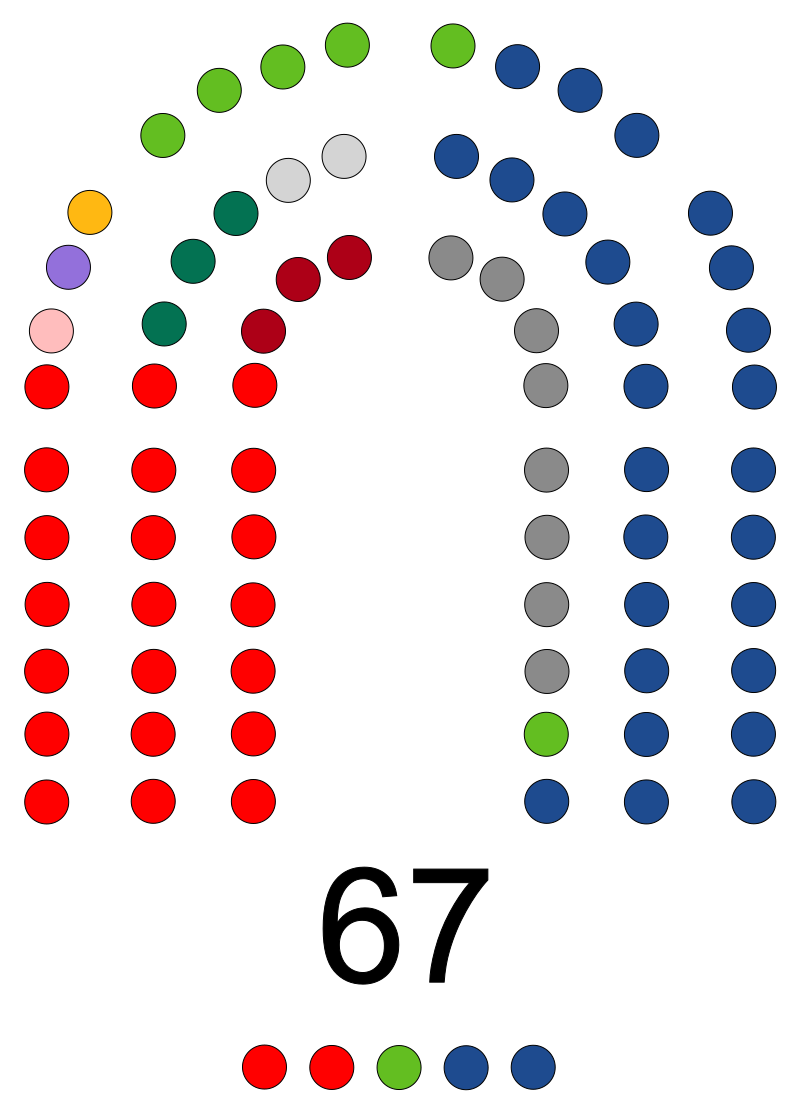
Aragon

Asturias

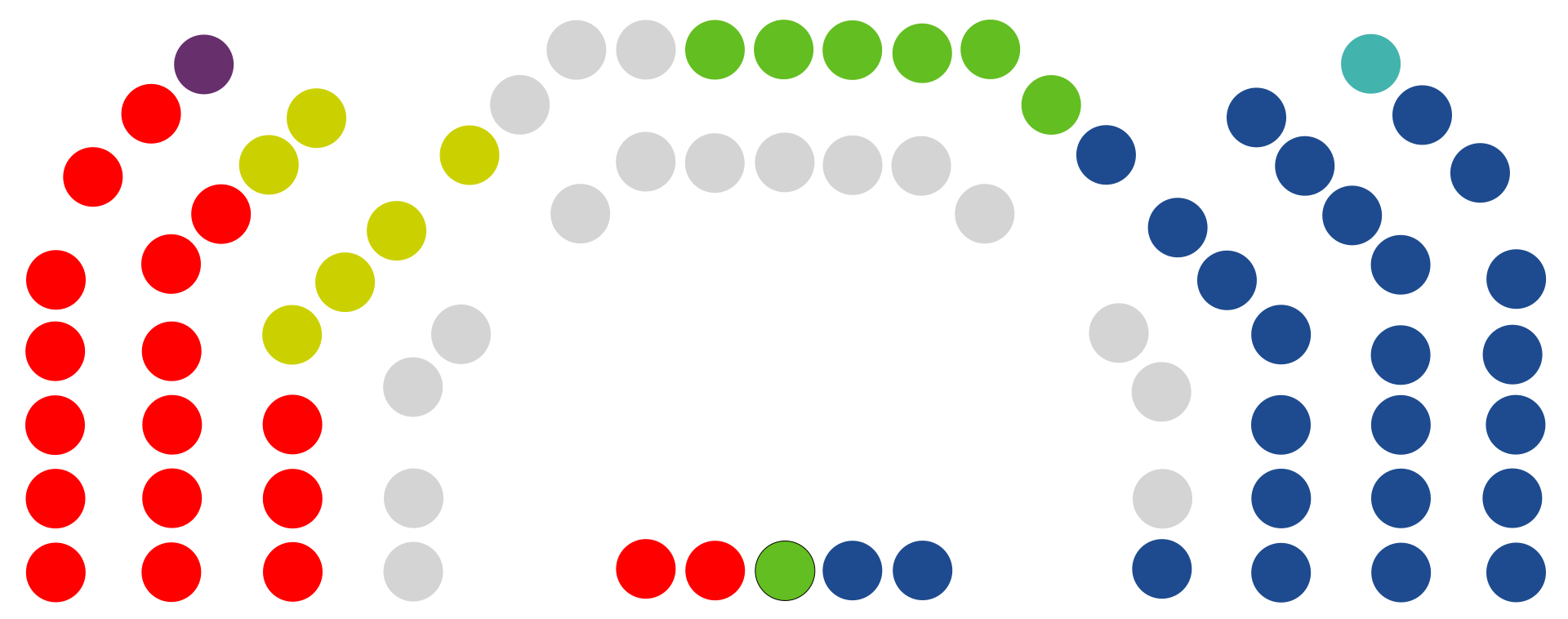
Balearic Islands

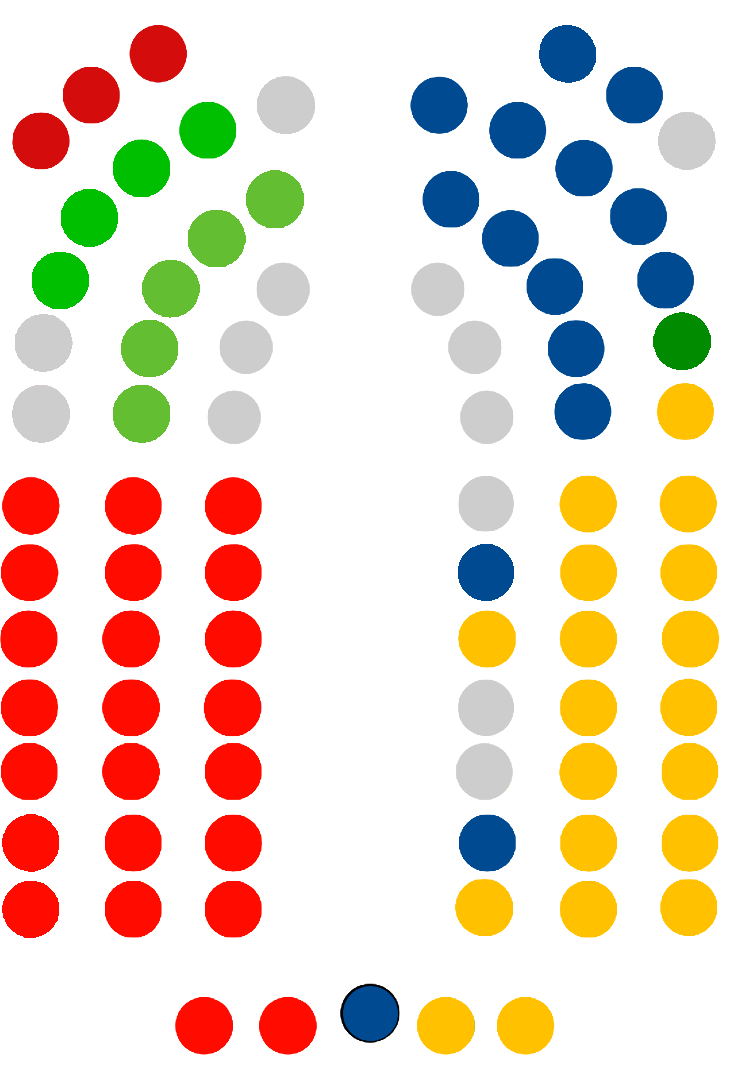
Canary Islands

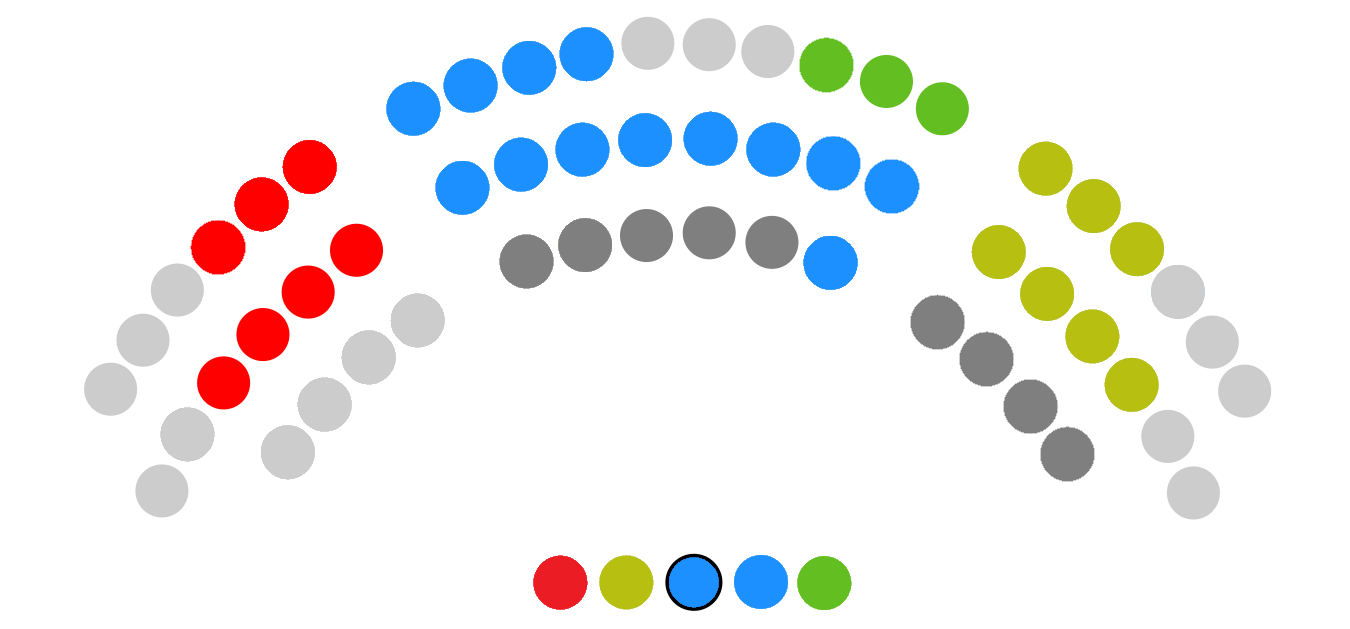
Cantabria

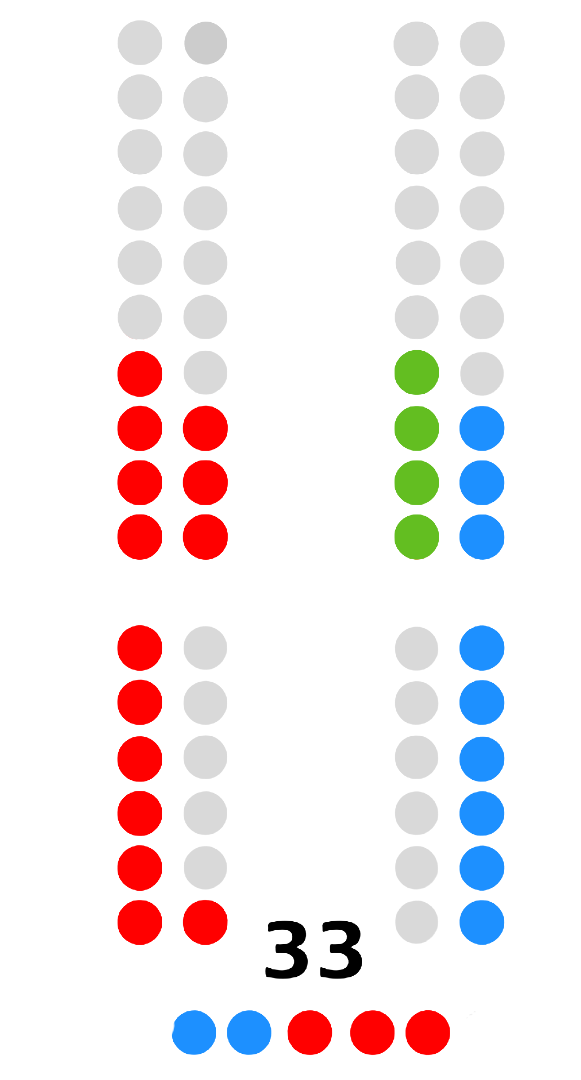
Castilla-La Mancha

Castile and León

Catalonia

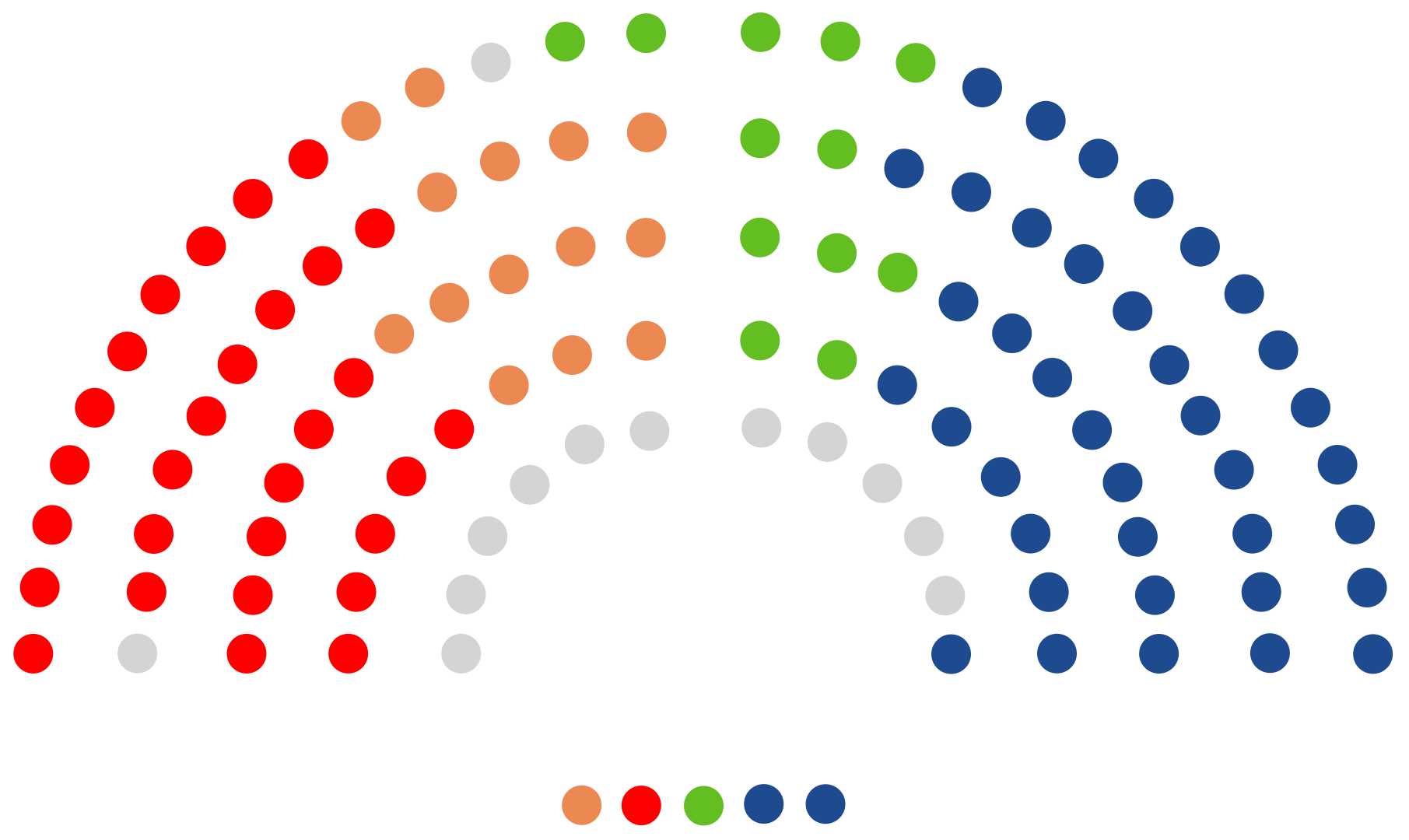
Valencian Community

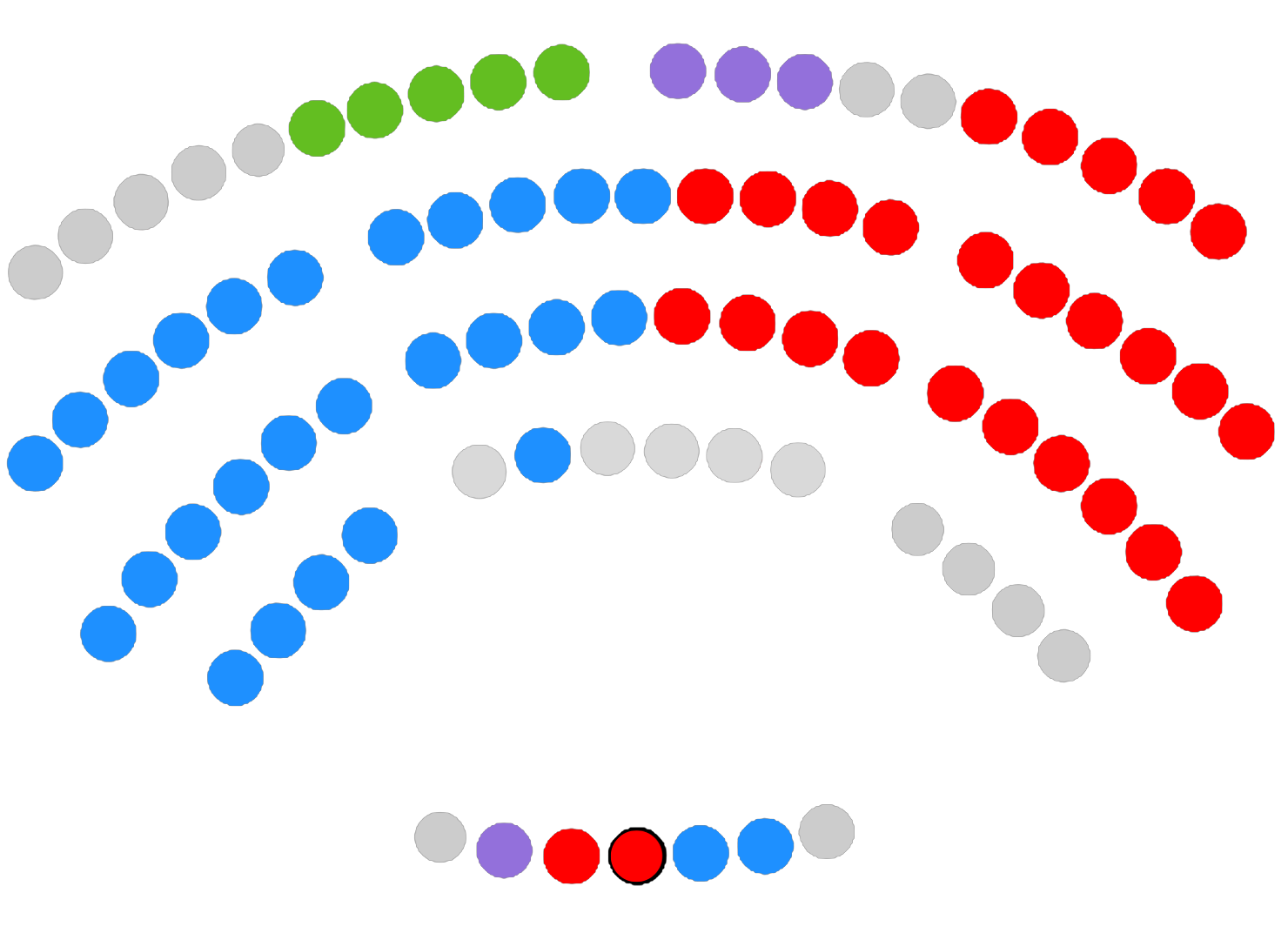
Extremaudra

Galicia

La Rioja

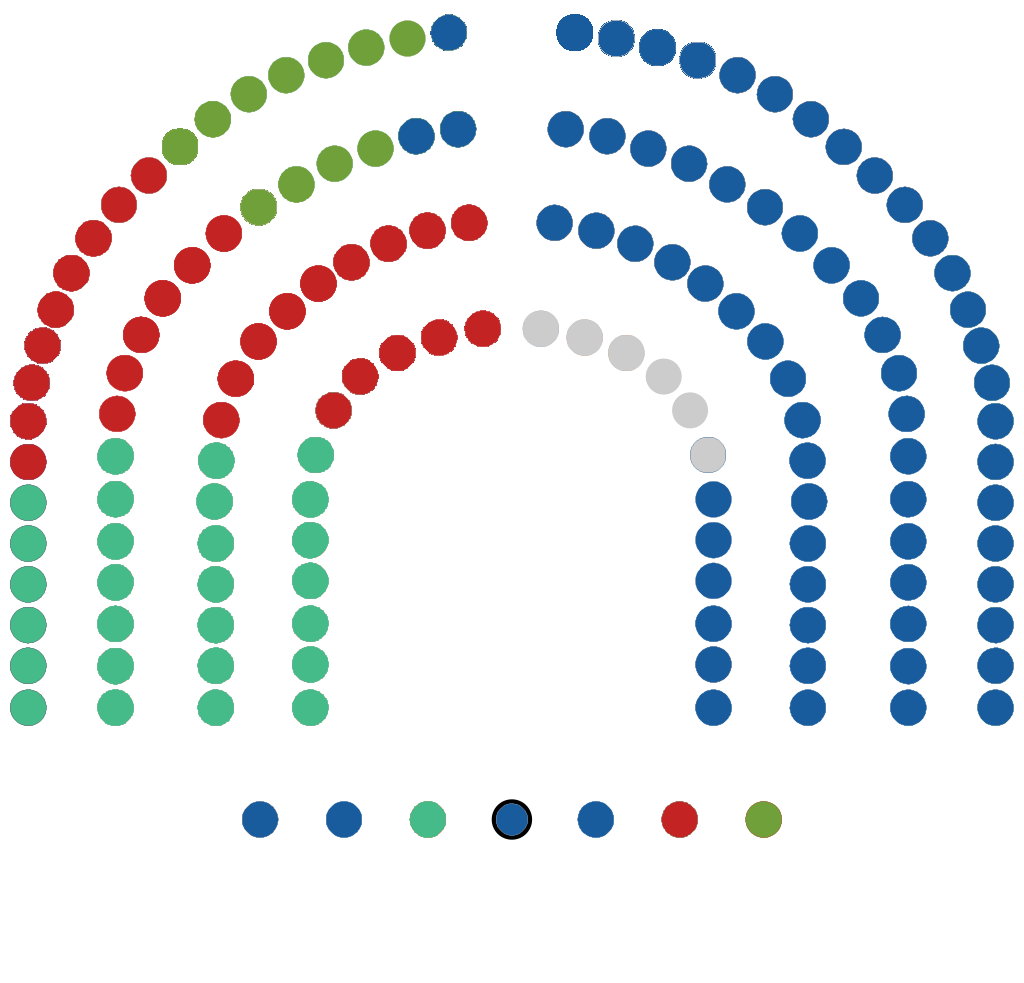
Community of Madrid

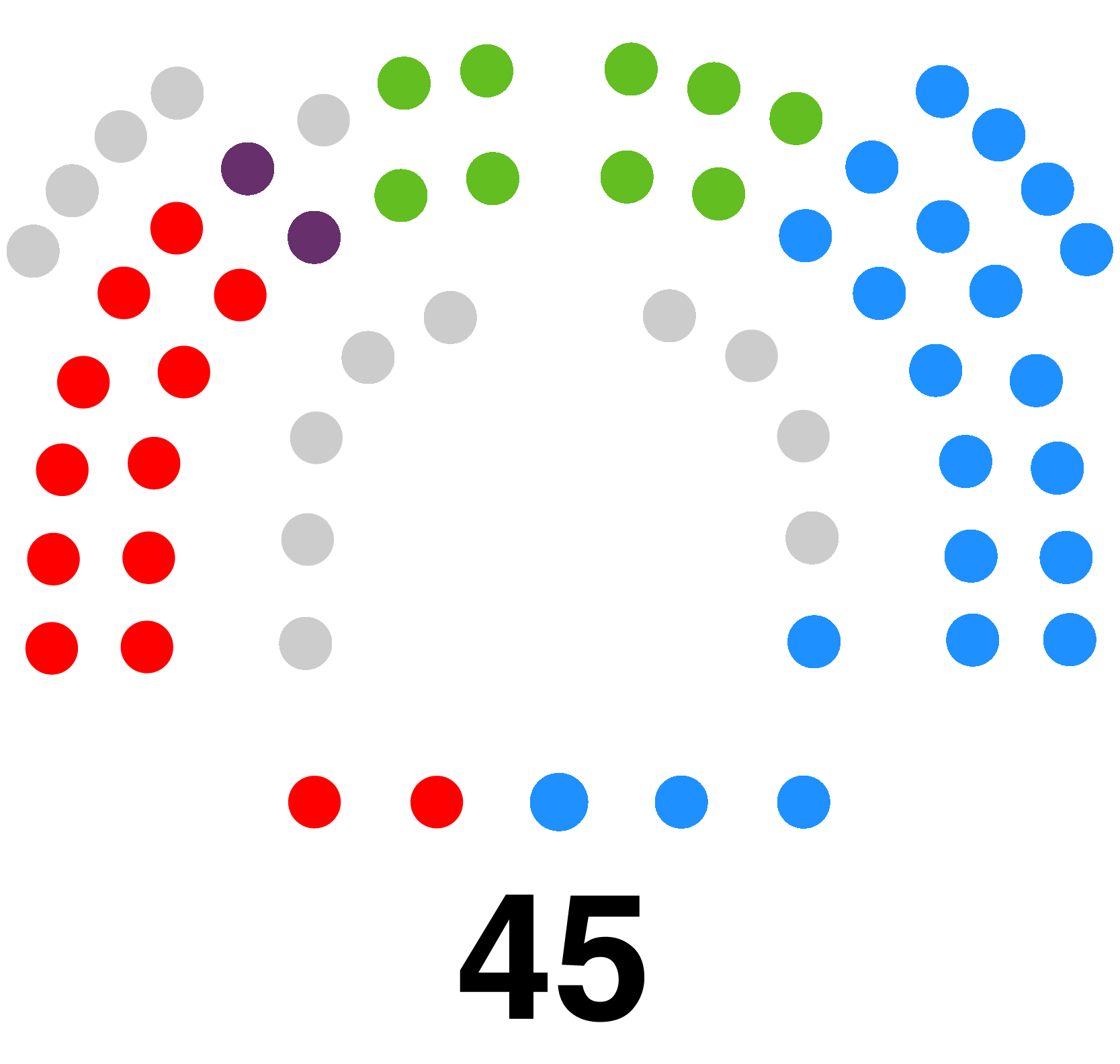
Region of Murcia

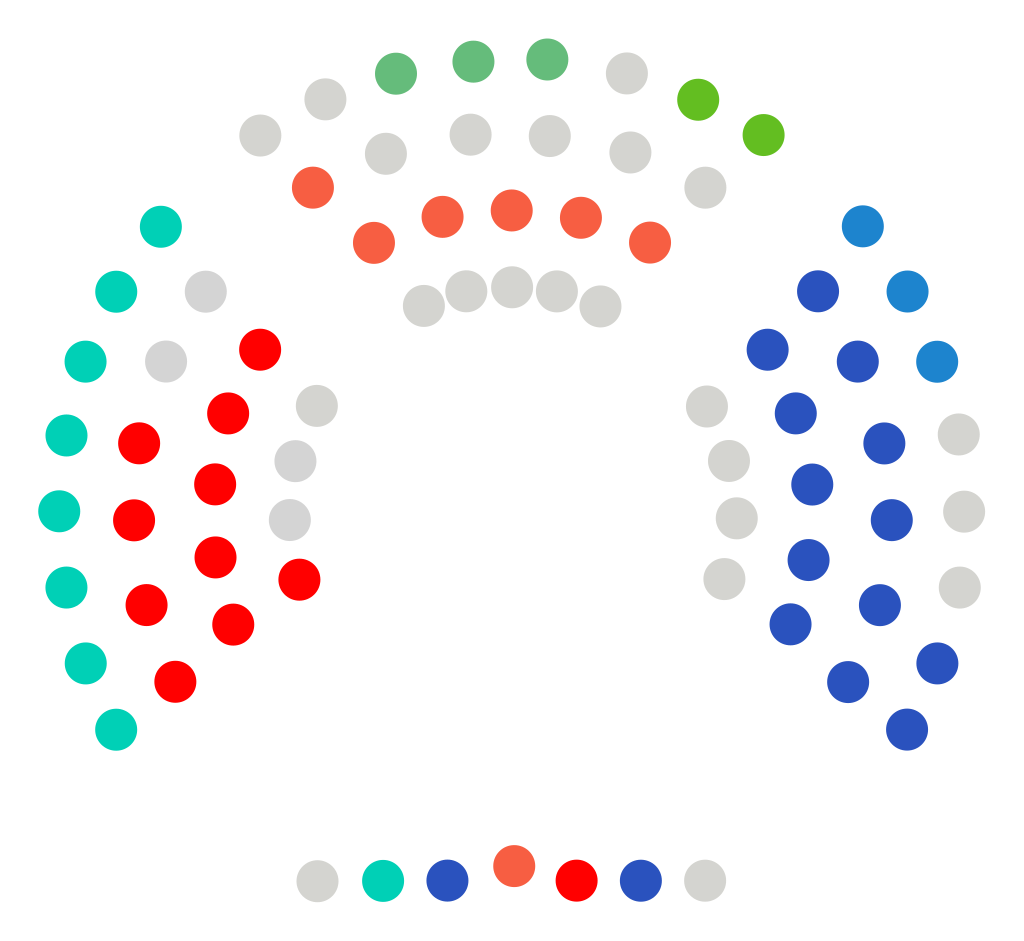
Navarre

Basque Country

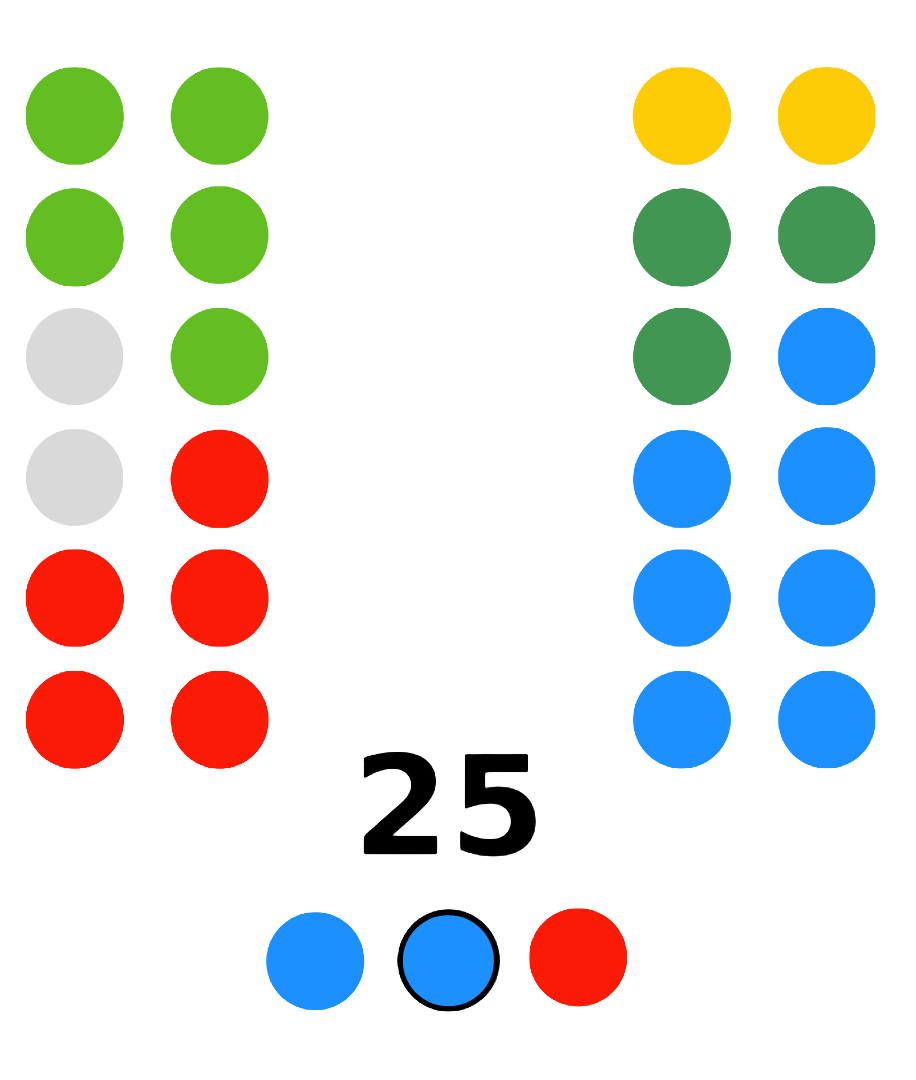
Ceuta

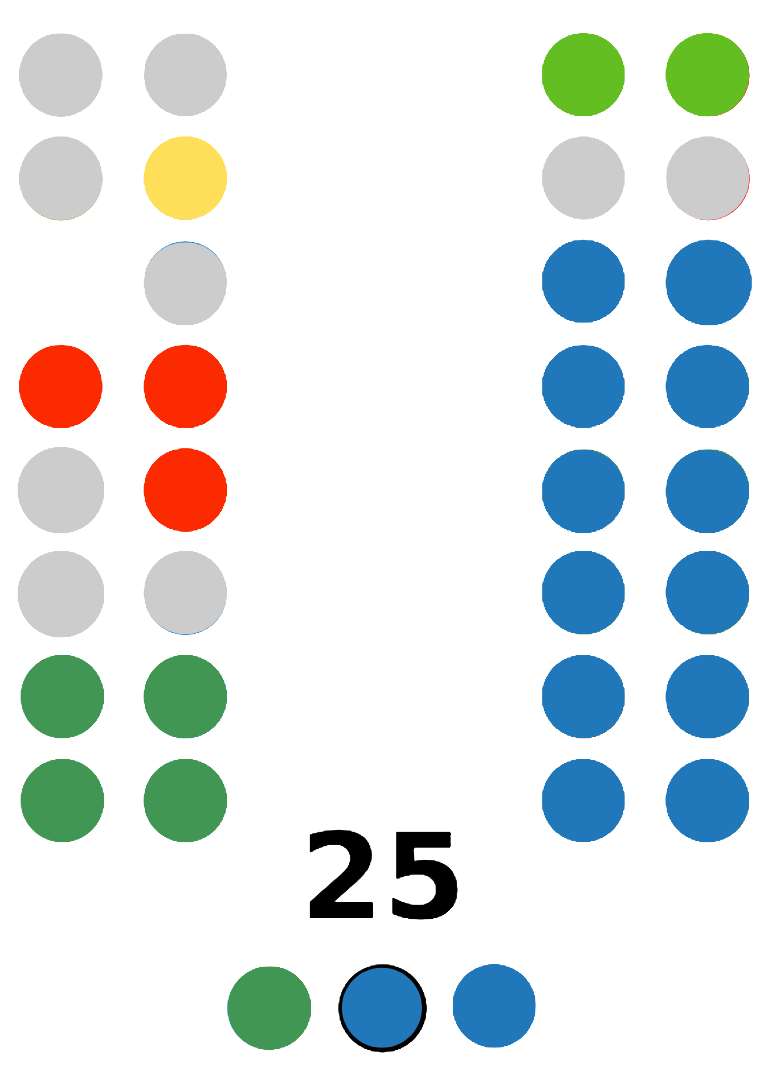
Melilla

== See also ==
- List of current presidents of the autonomous communities of Spain
- President (Autonomous Community of Spain)
- Politics of Spain
- Autonomous communities in Spain
- Constitution of Spain
- National and regional identity in Spain
