= Javier Guerrero (Spanish politician) =

Spanish doctor and politician

Minister of Health of Ceuta
- In office 2019 – January 2021
- President: Juan Jesús Vivas

Personal details
- Born: Ceuta, Spain
- Party: Avanza Ceuta (2022–present)
- Other political affiliations: People's Party (until 2022)
- Education: University of Granada (MD)
- Profession: Doctor, politician

Francisco Javier Guerrero Gallego is a Spanish doctor and politician. He was minister of health in Ceuta from 2019 to 2021. After leaving this office, he quit the People's Party and founded Avanza Ceuta.

== Biography ==
Born in Ceuta, Guerrero was married and the father of three children as of June 2020. He graduated in medicine and surgery from the University of Granada.

In 2019, Guerrero was named Minister of Health in the government of Mayor-President of Ceuta Juan Jesús Vivas of the People's Party (PP). He resigned in January 2021 after a controversy over him receiving the COVID-19 vaccine before it was publicly available. He said that he had been recommended to take the vaccine by others in his team, due to his frequent visits to hospitals and his heart condition, hypertension and diabetes. He was also scrutinised during his ministry for continuing to practice medicine privately, and for a purchase of face masks at a far above average price.

Guerrero initiated a bid for the presidency of the People's Party of Ceuta but soon withdrew, instead announcing in May 2022 that he would form a new party for the Assembly of Ceuta elections in twelve months' time. In June, Avanza Ceuta was launched; local newspaper El Pueblo de Ceuta placed it on the centre right.

In January 2023, Guerrero was arrested and held on remand for alleged sexual abuse of unaccompanied migrant children in Ceuta. In November, he posted bail of €100,000. Twelve months later, he was acquitted of slander and libel of the staff of a children's home, after having said that the staff had coerced and threatened children into reporting him; it was found that he did not identify any individuals, nor did he knowingly spread falsehoods.
