= Juan Sergio Redondo =

Spanish historian and politician

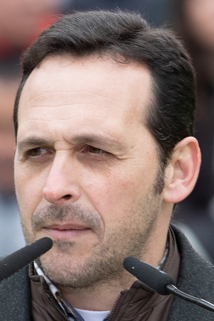

Member of the Assembly of Ceuta
- Incumbent
- Assumed office 26 May 2019

Personal details
- Born: Ceuta, Spain
- Died: 1976 (age 49–50)
- Party: Vox
- Education: UNED; University of Granada
- Occupation: Historian

Juan Sergio Redondo Pacheco (born 1976) is a Spanish historian and politician who has been the leader of Vox in the Assembly of Ceuta since 2019.

== Early life and career ==
Born in Ceuta, Redondo graduated in Geography and History from the National University of Distance Education (UNED) in the city and completed a doctorate at the University of Granada. He also received a law degree from the former and a teaching degree from the latter. He is a historian at the UNED in Ceuta and has spoken at conferences promoting Spanish claims to Gibraltar. He is a member of the self-styled Sovereign Military Order of the Temple of Jerusalem, with the rank of Chronicler. He played junior football on the same team as Mohamed Alí, the leader of the Caballas Coalition.

== Political career ==
Redondo became coordinator of Vox in Ceuta in 2016, and the division's president in 2018. In April 2019, he was named to lead the party's campaign in the Ceuta Assembly election. His party took just under a quarter of the votes, coming third and winning their first six seats in the Assembly. The election resulted in mayor-president Juan Jesús Vivas's People's Party (PP) losing their majority that they had held since 2003, and thereby needing to reach agreements with other parties including Vox in order to govern.

Redondo has called for Ceuta to end public holidays for Eid al-Adha and introduce a day off for the city's saint, Daniel. Vox had endorsed two calendars including Eid al-Adha, ostensibly only so that there would be an official calendar.

A December 2022 poll showed put Vox in first place for the 2023 Ceuta Assembly election with nine seats and 32.83% of the vote. The party ended up in third behind the PP and the Spanish Socialist Workers' Party (PSOE), dropping one seat to five.

Redondo was placed third on Vox's list in the Madrid constituency for the Congress of Deputies in the 2026 Spanish general election, behind party leader Santiago Abascal and Montserrat Lluis.

== Legal issues ==
Redondo took Mohamed Alí to court in January 2020 for having called him a fascist in an Assembly session. The case was thrown out three years later.

In July 2021, Redondo was called to court for having called former Vox member Juan Manuel Aguiar a blackmailer and extortionist for having allegedly leaked racist messages by him. In the messages, a person called for military action against "Moors" if the political process failed, and called Vivas a gilipollas ("wanker") for endorsing multiculturalism. He mocked processions of the Hindu god Ganesha as "taking an elephant for a walk". That October, the legal process against him for inciting hatred with the messages was dismissed. On 9 February 2023, he was convicted of libel for falsely accusing Aguiar of a criminal plot, being fined €10,000. His conviction was overturned by the Supreme Court of Spain in July 2024.

In February 2023, a trial began against Redondo and fellow Vox Ceuta member Francisco José Ruiz for having called the Civil Guards Omar Mohamed and Rachid Sbihi "puppets of the pro-Moroccan far left". The context of these insults was that they had met with Assembly members of the PSOE, Movement for Dignity and Citizenship (MDyC) and the Caballas Coalition during the May 2021 migration crisis, in addition to meeting mayor-president Vivas, whose PP party is on the right.
