= 2019 Ceuta Assembly election =

Election in the Spanish autonomous city of Ceuta

- 26 May 2019

All 25 seats in the Assembly of Ceuta 13 seats needed for a majority
- Registered: 62,561 1.3%
- Turnout: 34,118 (54.5%); 6.5 pp
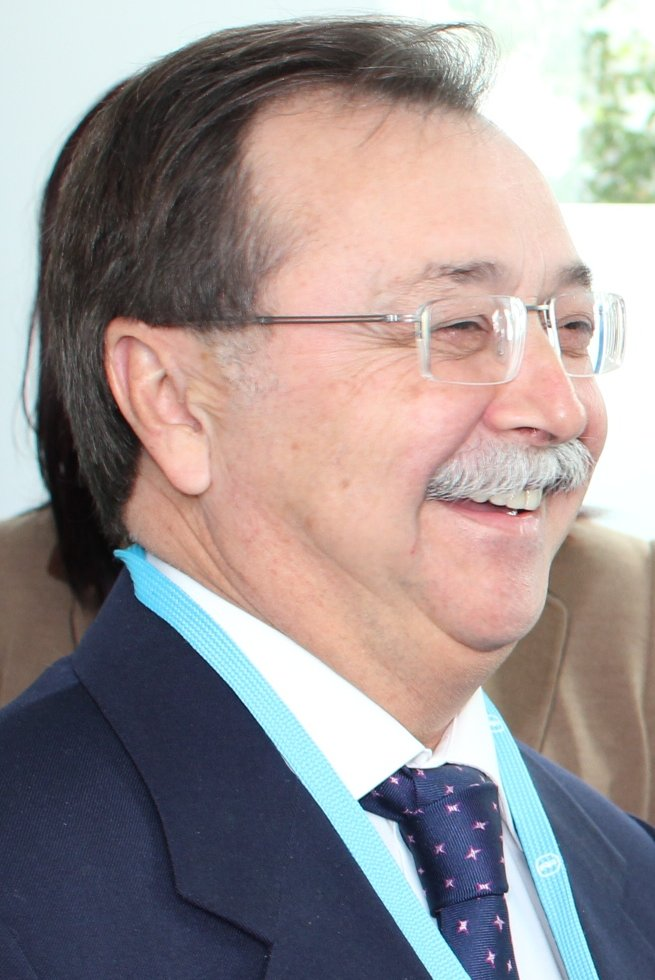

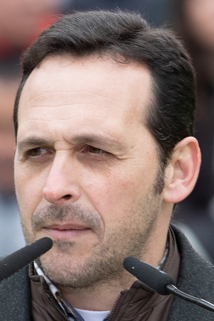

	First party	Second party	Third party
Leader	Juan Jesús Vivas	Manuel Hernández Peinado	Juan Sergio Redondo
Party	PP	PSOE	Vox
Leader since	October 1999	25 July 2015	22 April 2019
Last election	13 seats, 45.7%	4 seats, 14.0%	0 seats, 1.2%
Seats won	9	7	6
Seat change	4	3	6
Popular vote	10,527	8,658	7,566
Percentage	31.1%	25.6%	22.4%
Swing	14.6 pp	11.6 pp	21.2 pp
	Fourth party	Fifth party	Sixth party
Leader	Fatima Hamed	Mohamed Alí	Javier Varga
Party	MDyC	Caballas	Cs
Leader since	27 October 2014	14 March 2011	23 February 2015
Last election	3 seats, 11.2%	4 seats, 13.3%	1 seat, 6.0%
Seats won	2	1	0
Seat change	1	3	1
Popular vote	2,353	2,105	1,537
Percentage	7.0%	6.2%	4.5%
Swing	4.2 pp	7.1 pp	1.5 pp
Mayor-President before election
Juan Jesús Vivas
PP
Elected Mayor-President
Juan Jesús Vivas
PP

The 2019 Ceuta Assembly election, was held on Sunday, 26 May 2019, to elect the 7th Assembly of the Autonomous City of Ceuta. All 25 seats in the Assembly were up for election. The election was held simultaneously with regional elections in thirteen autonomous communities and local elections all throughout Spain, as well as the 2019 European Parliament election.

== Electoral system ==
The Assembly of Ceuta is the top-tier administrative and governing body of the autonomous city of Ceuta. Voting for the Assembly is on the basis of universal suffrage, which comprises all nationals over eighteen, registered and residing in the municipality of Ceuta and in full enjoyment of their political rights, as well as resident non-national European citizens and those whose country of origin allows Spanish nationals to vote in their own elections by virtue of a treaty.

The 25 members of the Assembly of Ceuta are elected using the D'Hondt method and a closed list proportional representation, with a threshold of 5 percent of valid votes—which includes blank ballots—being applied. Parties not reaching the threshold are not taken into consideration for seat distribution.

The Mayor-President is indirectly elected by the plenary assembly. A legal clause requires that mayoral candidates earn the vote of an absolute majority of members, or else the candidate of the most-voted party in the assembly shall be automatically appointed to the post. In case of a tie, a toss-up would determine the appointee.

== Parties and candidates ==
The electoral law allowed for parties and federations registered in the interior ministry, coalitions and groupings of electors to present lists of candidates. Parties and federations intending to form a coalition ahead of an election were required to inform the relevant Electoral Commission within ten days of the election call, whereas groupings of electors needed to secure the signature of at least one percent of the electorate in the constituencies for which they sought election, disallowing electors from signing for more than one list of candidates.

== Opinion polls ==
The table below lists voting intention estimates in reverse chronological order, showing the most recent first and using the dates when the survey fieldwork was done, as opposed to the date of publication. Where the fieldwork dates are unknown, the date of publication is given instead. The highest percentage figure in each polling survey is displayed with its background shaded in the leading party's colour. If a tie ensues, this is applied to the figures with the highest percentages. The "Lead" column on the right shows the percentage-point difference between the parties with the highest percentages in a poll. When available, seat projections determined by the polling organisations are displayed below (or in place of) the percentages in a smaller font; 13 seats were required for an absolute majority in the Assembly of Ceuta.

Polling firm/Commissioner	Fieldwork date	Sample size	Turnout	PP	PSOE	Caballas	MDyC	Cs	PDSC	IU	Vox	Podemos	Unidas Podemos	Lead
2019 Assembly election	26 May 2019	—N/a	56.9	31.1; 9	25.6; 7	6.2; 1	7.0; 2	4.5; 0	1.0; 0	(Note: Within Unidas Podemos.)	22.4; 6		1.5; 0	5.5
La Verdad de Ceuta	20 May 2019	?	?	? 6/7	? 5/6	? 0/1	? 5/6	? 0/1	? 0		? 7/8		? 0	?
April 2019 general election	28 Apr 2019	—N/a	64.0	21.4 (6)	36.3 (10)	–	–	12.0 (3)	–		24.0 (6)		4.8 (0)	14.9
ElectoPanel/Electomanía	31 Mar–7 Apr 2019	?	?	30.0; 9	20.1; 6	5.1; 1	6.5; 1	9.1; 2	–		22.4; 6		2.3; 0	7.6
ElectoPanel/Electomanía	24–31 Mar 2019	?	?	29.4; 9	20.3; 6	5.1; 1	6.4; 1	9.4; 2	–		22.6; 6		2.3; 0	6.8
ElectoPanel/Electomanía	17–24 Mar 2019	?	?	29.2; 8	21.0; 6	5.3; 1	6.7; 2	8.6; 2	–		22.7; 6		2.3; 0	6.5
La Verdad de Ceuta	18 Mar 2019	3,423	?	23.0; 6/7	17.3; 5	6.4; 1	9.9; 2/3	1.2; 0	–	–	36.5; 10/11	1.1; 0	–	13.5
ElectoPanel/Electomanía	10–17 Mar 2019	?	?	28.4; 8	20.0; 5	5.0; 1	6.6; 1	7.2; 2	–		27.0; 8		2.3; 0	1.4
ElectoPanel/Electomanía	3–10 Mar 2019	?	?	28.0; 8	19.9; 5	5.1; 1	6.6; 1	7.5; 2	–		27.0; 8		2.4; 0	1.0
ElectoPanel/Electomanía	22 Feb–3 Mar 2019	?	?	28.1; 8	19.6; 5	4.9; 0	6.7; 2	8.0; 2	–		26.9; 8		2.4; 0	1.2
Sigma Dos/Ceuta Ahora	14–19 Dec 2018	600	?	34.7; 10	18.5; 5	6.3; 1	6.6; 1/2	9.4; 2	–		19.1; 5/6		2.8; 0	15.6
La Verdad de Ceuta	22 Nov 2018	1,725	?	36.1; 10	20.8; 6	7.5; 2	10.4; 3	3.1; 0	–	0.2; 0	13.4; 4	0.4; 0	–	15.3
SyM Consulting	7–9 Sep 2018	518	47.0	40.5; 11/12	22.6; 6	14.2; 3/4	7.7; 2	9.6; 2	1.9; 0	–	–	–	–	17.9
SyM Consulting	24–25 Apr 2018	537	40.5	37.9; 10/11	16.6; 4/5	17.6; 5	8.7; 2	12.6; 3	1.3; 0	–	–	–	–	20.3
SyM Consulting	8–9 Feb 2018	497	43.1	42.7; 11/12	16.1; 4/5	15.5; 4	8.4; 2	11.5; 3	1.3; 0	–	–	–	–	26.6
La Verdad de Ceuta	14 May 2017	8,088	?	41.5; 12	13.8; 4	10.4; 3	10.3; 3	10.2; 2	2.1; 0	1.2; 0	–	6.9; 1	–	27.7
2016 general election	26 Jun 2016	—N/a	50.7	51.9 (14)	22.6 (6)		–	11.5 (3)	–		0.5 (0)		10.8 (2)	29.3
2015 general election	20 Dec 2015	—N/a	54.4	44.9 (12)	23.1 (6)	(Note: Within Podemos.)	–	13.3 (3)	–	1.3 (0)	–	14.1 (4)	–	21.8
2015 Assembly election	24 May 2015	—N/a	48.0	45.7; 13	14.0; 4	13.3; 4	11.2; 3	6.0; 1	1.8; 0	1.6; 0	1.2; 0	–	–	31.7

== Results ==
← Summary of the 26 May 2019 Assembly of Ceuta election results →
Parties and alliances	Popular vote			Seats	
Parties and alliances	Votes	%	±pp	Total	+/−
People's Party (PP)	10,527	31.12	–14.62	9	–4
Spanish Socialist Workers' Party (PSOE)	8,658	25.60	+11.56	7	+3
Vox (Vox)	7,566	22.37	+21.15	6	+6
Movement for Dignity and Citizenship (MDyC)	2,353	6.96	–4.21	2	–1
Caballas Coalition (Caballas)	2,105	6.22	–7.05	1	–3
Citizens–Party of the Citizenry (Cs)	1,537	4.54	–1.47	0	–1
United We Can–United Left–Equo (Podemos–IU–Equo)^{1}	505	1.49	–0.09	0	±0
Coalition for Ceuta–Democratic and Social Party of Ceuta (CPC–PDSC)	329	0.97	–0.85	0	±0
For a Fairer World (PUM+J)	42	0.12	New	0	±0
Blank ballots	204	0.60	–1.00		
Total	33,826			25	±0
Valid votes	33,826	99.14	+0.61		
Invalid votes	292	0.86	–0.61		
Votes cast / turnout	34,118	54.54	+6.51		
Abstentions	28,443	45.46	–6.51		
Registered voters	62,561				
Sources
Footnotes: ^{1} United We Can–United Left–Equo results are compared to United Left totals in the 2015 election.

Popular vote
PP	31.12%
PSOE	25.60%
Vox	22.37%
MDyC	6.96%
Caballas	6.22%
Cs	4.54%
Unidas Podemos	1.49%
Others	1.10%
Blank ballots	0.60%

Seats
PP	36.00%
PSOE	28.00%
Vox	24.00%
MDyC	8.00%
Caballas	4.00%

== Aftermath ==
Investiture
Ballot →	15 June 2019	
Required majority →	13 out of 25	
Juan Jesús Vivas (PP): • PP (9)	9 / 25	check
Juan Sergio Redondo (Vox): • Vox (6)	6 / 25	X mark
Blank ballots: • PSOE (7); • MDyC (2); • Caballas (1)	10 / 25	
Absentees	0 / 25	
