= Yolanda Merelo Palomares =

Spanish politician

Spanish Senator designated by the Assembly of Ceuta
- Incumbent
- Assumed office 19 December 2019

Member of the Assembly of Ceuta
- Incumbent
- Assumed office 26 May 2019

Personal details
- Born: Madrid, Spain
- Party: Vox

Yolanda Merelo Palomares is a Spanish politician who is a member of the Assembly of Ceuta and a designated Senator for the Vox party.

Palomares was born in Madrid and trained as a nurse before entering politics. She worked for the Red Cross before moving to Ceuta in 2009 to take up a position at the Ceuta University Hospital. She was elected as a member of the Assembly of Ceuta in 2019. In December 2019, she was designated to sit as a Senator by her party after Vox's original Senator Juan Ros Alcaide did not take his seat.

In the Senate, she has called for tougher measures against migrants entering Ceuta from Morocco. In 2022 Senate debate, she accused the Moroccan government of an "attempt to conquer" Ceuta and Melilla by pushing migrants into the autonomous cities. During the same debate, she re-tabled a motion which had previously been proposed by Vox which called on NATO to expand its Article 6 to include the protection of Ceuta and Melilla. The motion was rejected by all other parties in the Senate apart from the People's Party who supported a modified version. In 2021, she was investigated alongside Vox's leader in Ceuta Juan Sergio Redondo over leaked WhatsApp messages which were accused of containing racist content. However, a court investigation dismissed the claims.
