= 2015 Ceuta Assembly election =

Election in the Spanish autonomous city of Ceuta

- 24 May 2015

All 25 seats in the Assembly of Ceuta 13 seats needed for a majority
- Registered: 61,782 2.4%
- Turnout: 29,671 (48.0%); 3.4 pp
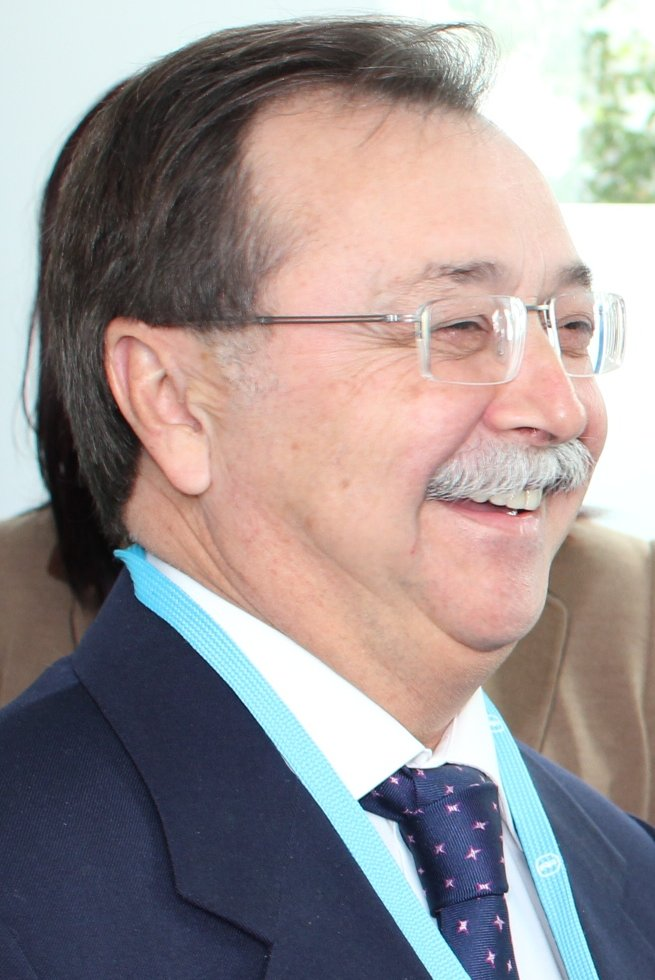

| | First party | Second party | Third party |
|---|---|---|---|
| Leader | Juan Jesús Vivas | José Antonio Carracao | Mohamed Alí |
| Party | PP | PSOE | Caballas |
| Leader since | October 1999 | 13 December 2008 | 14 March 2011 |
| Last election | 18 seats, 65.2% | 3 seats, 11.7% | 4 seats, 14.3% |
| Seats won | 13 | 4 | 4 |
| Seat change | 5 | 1 | 0 |
| Popular vote | 13,372 | 4,104 | 3,881 |
| Percentage | 45.7% | 14.0% | 13.3% |
| Swing | 19.5 pp | 2.3 pp | 1.0 pp |
| | Fourth party | Fifth party |
| Leader | Fatima Hamed | Javier Varga |
| Party | MDyC | C's |
| Leader since | 27 October 2014 | 23 February 2015 |
| Last election | Did not contest | Did not contest |
| Seats won | 3 | 1 |
| Seat change | 3 | 1 |
| Popular vote | 3,265 | 1,758 |
| Percentage | 11.2% | 6.0% |
| Swing | New party | New party |
Mayor-President before election
Juan Jesús Vivas
PP
Elected Mayor-President
Juan Jesús Vivas
PP

The 2015 Ceuta Assembly election was held on Sunday, 24 May 2015, to elect the 6th Assembly of the Autonomous City of Ceuta. All 25 seats in the Assembly were up for election. The election was held simultaneously with regional elections in thirteen autonomous communities and local elections all throughout Spain.

== Electoral system ==
The Assembly of Ceuta was the top-tier administrative and governing body of the autonomous city of Ceuta. Voting for the Assembly was on the basis of universal suffrage, which comprised all nationals over eighteen, registered and residing in the municipality of Ceuta and in full enjoyment of their political rights, as well as resident non-national European citizens and those whose country of origin allowed Spanish nationals to vote in their own elections by virtue of a treaty.

The 25 members of the Assembly of Ceuta were elected using the D'Hondt method and a closed list proportional representation, with a threshold of 5 percent of valid votes—which included blank ballots—being applied. Parties not reaching the threshold were not taken into consideration for seat distribution.

The Mayor-President was indirectly elected by the plenary assembly. A legal clause required that mayoral candidates earned the vote of an absolute majority of members, or else the candidate of the most-voted party in the assembly was to be automatically appointed to the post. In case of a tie, a toss-up would determine the appointee.

== Parties and candidates ==
The electoral law allowed for parties and federations registered in the interior ministry, coalitions and groupings of electors to present lists of candidates. Parties and federations intending to form a coalition ahead of an election were required to inform the relevant Electoral Commission within ten days of the election call, whereas groupings of electors needed to secure the signature of at least one percent of the electorate in the constituencies for which they sought election, disallowing electors from signing for more than one list of candidates.

== Opinion polls ==
The table below lists voting intention estimates in reverse chronological order, showing the most recent first and using the dates when the survey fieldwork was done, as opposed to the date of publication. Where the fieldwork dates are unknown, the date of publication is given instead. The highest percentage figure in each polling survey is displayed with its background shaded in the leading party's colour. If a tie ensues, this is applied to the figures with the highest percentages. The "Lead" column on the right shows the percentage-point difference between the parties with the highest percentages in a poll. When available, seat projections determined by the polling organisations are displayed below (or in place of) the percentages in a smaller font; 13 seats were required for an absolute majority in the Assembly of Ceuta.

| Polling firm/Commissioner | Fieldwork date | Sample size | Turnout | PP | Caballas | PSOE | UPyD | PDSC | LV–GV | Podemos | C's | MDyC | Lead |
|---|---|---|---|---|---|---|---|---|---|---|---|---|---|
| 2015 Assembly election | 24 May 2015 | —N/a | 48.0 | 45.7; 13 | 13.3; 4 | 14.0; 4 | 1.1; 0 | 1.8; 0 | 1.7; 0 | – | 6.0; 1 | 11.2; 3 | 31.7 |
| Infortécnica/Ceuta TV | 12–15 May 2015 | 371 | ? | 58.3; 16/18 | 14.3; 3/4 | 11.7; 2/3 | – | – | – | – | 9.3; 2/3 | – | 44.0 |
| Insobel/El Pueblo | 22 Apr–8 May 2015 | 600 | ? | ? 17/18 | ? 2 | ? 4/5 | – | – | – | – | ? 1 | ? 0/1 | ? |
| CIS | 23 Mar–19 Apr 2015 | 300 | ? | 49.5; 14 | 11.2; 3 | 22.6; 6 | 2.0; 0 | – | – | – | 6.8; 2 | – | 26.9 |
| Sociópolis | 15 Apr 2015 | 401 | ? | 52.0; 15/16 | 7.5; 2 | 17.0; 4/5 | 3.5; 0 | – | – | – | 5.7; 1/2 | 5.8; 1/2 | 35.0 |
| Sigma Dos/El Faro | 8–14 Apr 2015 | 1,000 | ? | 54.3; 15/16 | 8.8; 2 | 16.2; 4/5 | – | – | – | – | 9.6; 2 | 4.4; 0/1 | 38.1 |
| Infortécnica/Ceuta TV | 6 Nov 2014 | 406 | ? | 62.0; 16/17 | 16.5; 4/5 | 14.8; 3/4 | – | – | – | 6.7; 0/2 | – | – | 45.5 |
| Sigma Dos/El Faro | 23 Sep–7 Oct 2014 | 1,000 | ? | 54.6; 15/16 | 13.7; 4 | 16.4; 4/5 | – | – | – | 6.2; 1 | – | – | 38.2 |
| 2014 EP election | 25 May 2014 | —N/a | 25.9 | 40.3 (13) | 9.0 (3) | 22.5 (7) | 6.8 (2) | – | – | 3.7 (0) | 2.4 (0) | – | 17.8 |
| SyM Consulting | 22–27 Jan 2014 | 372 | 79.8 | 41.0; 16/17 | 9.6; 3 | 12.0; 4 | 4.8; 0/1 | 3.6; 0 | 6.0; 2 | – | – | – | 29.0 |
| SyM Consulting | 17–22 Sep 2013 | 432 | 66.1 | 42.1; 13/14 | 6.4; 3/4 | 16.2; 4/5 | 8.5; 2/3 | 2.1; 0 | 5.3; 0/1 | – | – | – | 25.9 |
| SyM Consulting | 1 Jun 2013 | ? | 58.0 | 54.1; 15/16 | 16.6; 5/6 | 11.7; 3/4 | 6.0; 0/1 | 0.7; 0 | 4.7; 0 | – | – | – | 37.5 |
| 2011 general election | 20 Nov 2011 | —N/a | 53.2 | 65.9 (19) | 5.4 (1) | 20.3 (5) | 3.3 (0) | – | – | – | – | – | 45.6 |
| 2011 Assembly election | 22 May 2011 | —N/a | 51.4 | 65.2; 18 | 14.3; 4 | 11.7; 3 | 2.7; 0 | 2.3; 0 | 1.9; 0 | – | – | – | 50.9 |

== Results ==
← Summary of the 24 May 2015 Assembly of Ceuta election results →
| Parties and alliances | Popular vote | | | Seats | |
| Parties and alliances | Votes | % | ±pp | Total | +/− |
|---|---|---|---|---|---|
| People's Party (PP) | 13,372 | 45.74 | –19.42 | 13 | –5 |
| Spanish Socialist Workers' Party (PSOE) | 4,104 | 14.04 | +2.34 | 4 | +1 |
| Caballas Coalition (Caballas) | 3,881 | 13.27 | –1.05 | 4 | ±0 |
| Movement for Dignity and Citizenship (MDyC) | 3,265 | 11.17 | New | 3 | +3 |
| Citizens–Party of the Citizenry (C's) | 1,758 | 6.01 | New | 1 | +1 |
| Democratic and Social Party of Ceuta (PDSC) | 531 | 1.82 | –0.52 | 0 | ±0 |
| The Greens–Green Group of Ceuta (LV–GV) | 511 | 1.75 | –0.10 | 0 | ±0 |
| United Left (IU) | 461 | 1.58 | New | 0 | ±0 |
| Vox (Vox) | 356 | 1.22 | New | 0 | ±0 |
| Union, Progress and Democracy (UPyD) | 329 | 1.13 | –1.53 | 0 | ±0 |
| Ceutan Free Party (PLCeutí) | 200 | 0.68 | New | 0 | ±0 |
| Blank ballots | 468 | 1.60 | +0.08 | | |
| Total | 29,236 | | | 25 | ±0 |
| Valid votes | 29,236 | 98.53 | –0.74 | | |
| Invalid votes | 435 | 1.47 | +0.74 | | |
| Votes cast / turnout | 29,671 | 48.03 | –3.34 | | |
| Abstentions | 32,111 | 51.97 | +3.34 | | |
| Registered voters | 61,782 | | | | |

Popular vote
| PP | 45.74% |
| PSOE | 14.04% |
| Caballas | 13.27% |
| MDyC | 11.17% |
| C's | 6.01% |
| PDSC | 1.82% |
| LV–GV | 1.75% |
| IU | 1.58% |
| Vox | 1.22% |
| UPyD | 1.13% |
| PLCeutí | 0.68% |
| Blank ballots | 1.60% |

Seats
| PP | 52.00% |
| PSOE | 16.00% |
| Caballas | 16.00% |
| MDyC | 12.00% |
| C's | 4.00% |
