= Javier Guerrero =

Javier Guerrero may refer to:

- Javier Guerrero García (born 1958), Mexican politician
- Javier Guerrero (Spanish politician)
- Xavier Guerrero (born Javier Guerrero, 1896–1974), Mexican muralist
