= People's Party of Ceuta =

People's Party of Ceuta Partido Popular de Ceuta
- President: Juan Jesús Vivas Lara
- Secretary-General: Yolanda Bel Blanca
- Founded: 1989; 37 years ago
- Headquarters: Teniente Arrabal, 4 Edificios Ainara III, Semisótano; Ceuta
- Ideology: Economic liberalism Christian democracy Regionalism
- Political position: Centre-right
- National affiliation: People's Party
- Assembly of Ceuta: 9 / 25
- Congress of Deputies (Ceuta seats): 1 / 1
- Senate (Ceuta seats): 1 / 2

Website
- www.ppceuta.es

The People's Party of Ceuta (Spanish: Partido Popular de Ceuta, PP) is the regional section of the People's Party of Spain (PP) in Ceuta. It was formed in 1989 from the re-foundation of the People's Alliance.

The People's Party won 6 out of 25 council seats in 1991, reaching second place behind Progress and Future of Ceuta (PFC). The PP won 9 seats in the 1995 Ceuta Assembly election, now being in first place. However, PFC's Basilio Fernández became mayor with the support of United Ceuta and the Spanish Socialist Workers' Party (PSOE). Divisions within Fernández's party led him to resign, which resulted in PP's Jesús Fortes taking the position on 22 July 1996. In the 1999 election, the Liberal Independent Group (GIL) won 12 seats, compared to PP's 8. An agreement with the PDSC (3 seats) and PSOE (2 seats) allowed Fortes to hold on for two months, until a vote of no confidence installed GIL's Antonio Sampietro on 22 August 1999. PP's Juan Jesús Vivas became mayor on 6 February 2001, when some GIL defectors helped the three opposition parties accomplish this.

Subsequently, the PP has consistently had strong electoral success, winning majorities: 19 seats in 2003, 19 in 2007, 18 in 2011, and 13 in 2015. The PP dropped to 9 seats in the 2019 and 2023 elections, but still remained the largest party. As of 2026, Juan Jesús Vivas has led the city of Ceuta for 25 years.
