= 2023 Ceuta Assembly election =

Election in the Spanish autonomous city of Ceuta

- 28 May 2023

All 25 seats in the Assembly of Ceuta 13 seats needed for a majority
- Registered: 63,301 1.2%
- Turnout: 34,685 (54.8%); 0.3 pp

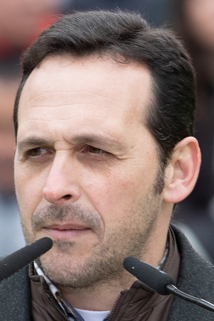

	First party	Second party	Third party
Leader	Juan Jesús Vivas	Juan Gutiérrez Torres	Juan Sergio Redondo
Party	PP	PSOE	Vox
Leader since	October 1999	28 September 2022	22 April 2019
Last election	9 seats, 31.1%	7 seats, 25.6%	6 seats, 22.4%
Seats won	9	6	5
Seat change	0	1	1
Popular vote	11,774	7,198	7,073
Percentage	34.3%	21.0%	20.6%
Swing	3.2 pp	4.6 pp	1.8 pp
	Fourth party	Fifth party
Leader	Fatima Hamed	Mohamed Mustafa
Party	MDyC	Ceuta Ya!
Leader since	27 October 2014	15 October 2021
Last election	2 seats, 7.0%	1 seat, 6.2% (Note: Results for Caballas in the 2019 election.)
Seats won	3	2
Seat change	1	1
Popular vote	3,848	3,442
Percentage	11.2%	10.0%
Swing	4.2 pp	3.8 pp
Mayor-President before election
Juan Jesús Vivas
PP
Elected Mayor-President
Juan Jesús Vivas
PP

The 2023 Ceuta Assembly election was held on Sunday, 28 May 2023, to elect the 8th Assembly of the autonomous city of Ceuta. All 25 seats in the Assembly were up for election. The election was held simultaneously with regional elections in twelve autonomous communities and local elections all throughout Spain.

== Electoral system ==
The Assembly of Ceuta was the top-tier administrative and governing body of the autonomous city of Ceuta. Voting for the Assembly was on the basis of universal suffrage, which comprised all nationals over eighteen, registered and residing in the municipality of Ceuta and in full enjoyment of their political rights, as well as resident non-national European citizens and those whose country of origin allowed Spanish nationals to vote in their own elections by virtue of a treaty.

The 25 members of the Assembly of Ceuta were elected using the D'Hondt method and a closed list proportional representation, with a threshold of five percent of valid votes—which included blank ballots—being applied.

The Mayor-President was indirectly elected by the plenary assembly. A legal clause required that mayoral candidates earned the vote of an absolute majority of councillors, or else the candidate of the most-voted party in the assembly was to be automatically appointed to the post. In the event of a tie, the appointee would be determined by lot.

== Parties and candidates ==
The electoral law allowed for parties and federations registered in the interior ministry, coalitions and groupings of electors to present lists of candidates. Parties and federations intending to form a coalition ahead of an election were required to inform the relevant Electoral Commission within ten days of the election call, whereas groupings of electors needed to secure the signature of at least one percent of the electorate in the constituencies for which they sought election, disallowing electors from signing for more than one list of candidates.

== Opinion polls ==
The tables below list opinion polling results in reverse chronological order, showing the most recent first and using the dates when the survey fieldwork was done, as opposed to the date of publication. Where the fieldwork dates are unknown, the date of publication is given instead. The highest percentage figure in each polling survey is displayed with its background shaded in the leading party's colour. If a tie ensues, this is applied to the figures with the highest percentages. The "Lead" column on the right shows the percentage-point difference between the parties with the highest percentages in a poll.

=== Graphical summary ===
Local regression trend line of poll results from 26 May 2019 to 28 May 2023, with each line corresponding to a political party.

=== Voting intention estimates ===
The table below lists weighted voting intention estimates. Refusals are generally excluded from the party vote percentages, while question wording and the treatment of "don't know" responses and those not intending to vote may vary between polling organisations. When available, seat projections determined by the polling organisations are displayed below (or in place of) the percentages in a smaller font; 13 seats were required for an absolute majority in the Assembly of Ceuta.

Polling firm/Commissioner	Fieldwork date	Sample size	Turnout	PP	PSOE	Vox	MDyC	Caballas	CS	Podemos	CY!	CA	Lead
2023 Assembly election	28 May 2023	—N/a	54.8	34.3; 9	21.0; 6	20.6; 5	11.2; 3	(Note: Within CY!.)	0.7; 0	0.6; 0	10.0; 2	–	13.3
EM-Analytics/El Plural	11–17 May 2023	250	?	34.1; 9	25.0; 7	21.3; 5	10.3; 2		0.8; 0	–	7.4; 2	–	9.1
EM-Analytics/El Plural	4–10 May 2023	250	?	33.4; 9	25.3; 7	21.6; 5	10.4; 2		0.8; 0	–	7.4; 2	–	8.1
EM-Analytics/El Plural	26 Apr–3 May 2023	250	?	33.5; 9	25.5; 7	21.2; 5	10.5; 2		0.8; 0	–	7.5; 2	–	8.0
EM-Analytics/El Plural	19–25 Apr 2023	250	?	33.5; 9	25.8; 7	20.8; 5	10.2; 2		0.6; 0	–	7.8; 2	–	7.7
GAD3/RTVCE	20–24 Apr 2023	803	?	39.3; 11	19.5; 5	21.3; 5/6	10.8; 2/3		0.3; 0	1.1; 0	6.0; 1	–	18.0
EM-Analytics/El Plural	12–18 Apr 2023	250	?	29.7; 8	25.6; 7	20.2; 6	9.7; 2		0.6; 0	–	8.3; 2	4.9; 0	4.1
SyM Consulting	7–11 Apr 2023	818	49.6	24.9; 6/7	21.9; 6	31.8; 8	10.7; 2/3		–	–	7.3; 2	–	6.9
EM-Analytics/El Plural	5–11 Apr 2023	250	?	30.4; 9	25.1; 7	19.9; 5	9.8; 2		0.6; 0	–	8.3; 2	4.9; 0	5.3
Dialoga Consultores/CeutaTV	9 Apr 2023	600	?	35.0; 9/11	31.2; 8/10	18.9; 4/6	5.5; 1/2		0.3; 0	0.3; 0	3.5; 0	4.2; 0/1	3.8
EM-Analytics/El Plural	27 Mar–4 Apr 2023	250	?	31.0; 9	24.7; 7	19.5; 5	9.8; 2		0.6; 0	–	8.4; 2	4.8; 0	6.3
GAD3/El Pueblo de Ceuta	23 Jan–10 Feb 2023	1,004	?	38.4; 11	21.9; 6	19.1; 5	9.6; 2		0.4; 0	–	5.0; 1	3.1; 0	16.5
SyM Consulting	5–9 Dec 2022	1,279	52.8	25.4; 6/7	20.2; 5	32.8; 9	7.4; 1/2		–	–	9.3; 3	1.9; 0	7.4
GAD3/El Pueblo de Ceuta	2–14 Sep 2022	684	?	36.3; 10	20.2; 5	18.4; 5	7.1; 2		0.4; 0	–	6.0; 1	9.9; 2	16.1
SyM Consulting	6–10 Jul 2022	1,116	53.8	25.4; 7	20.8; 5/6	31.9; 8/9	9.2; 2		–	–	7.2; 2	2.2; 0	6.5
NC Report/El Faro de Ceuta	3 Feb 2022	?	57.9	33.8; 9	27.4; 8	23.4; 6	5.1; 1		1.4; 0	1.4; 0	5.7; 1	–	6.4
SyM Consulting	16–19 Dec 2021	740	56.0	23.8; 6	22.1; 6	32.9; 8/9	11.6; 3		–	–	5.8; 1/2	–	9.1
EM-Analytics/Electomanía	30 Sep 2021	?	?	28.6; 8	23.6; 6	25.7; 7	10.3; 2	9.0; 2	1.5; 0	–	–	–	2.9
SyM Consulting	20–23 May 2021	732	53.2	26.6; 7	23.3; 6	28.2; 7/8	10.1; 2/3	7.8; 2	–	–	–	–	1.6
ElectoPanel/Electomanía	15 Feb 2021	400	?	31.7; 9	21.1; 6	22.4; 6	10.2; 2	10.4; 2	1.9; 0	–	–	–	9.3
SyM Consulting	9–12 Dec 2020	652	49.8	25.0; 7	20.1; 5/6	28.3; 7/8	8.9; 2	12.7; 3	–	–	–	–	3.3
ElectoPanel/Electomanía	16 Aug–26 Sep 2020	?	?	38.9; 10	22.1; 6	15.6; 4	10.9; 3	8.9; 2	2.3; 0	–	–	–	16.8
SyM Consulting	12–13 Sep 2020	687	50.8	29.8; 8	20.5; 5/6	23.4; 6/7	11.4; 3	9.7; 2	–	–	–	–	6.4
SyM Consulting	22–23 Jun 2020	564	59.3	35.4; 9/10	26.1; 7	14.5; 4	8.3; 2/3	9.2; 2	1.8; 0	–	–	–	9.3
SyM Consulting	25–26 May 2020	541	65.9	39.3; 10/11	18.2; 5	8.4; 2	16.8; 4/5	12.0; 3	1.4; 0	–	–	–	21.1
ElectoPanel/Electomanía	1 Apr–15 May 2020	?	?	40.0; 11	24.2; 7	16.4; 4	7.6; 2	6.4; 1	2.4; 0	–	–	–	15.8
SyM Consulting	1–2 Feb 2020	534	61.7	39.1; 10/11	24.9; 7	7.9; 2	12.5; 3	10.1; 2/3	1.6; 0	–	–	–	14.2
November 2019 general election	10 Nov 2019	—N/a	54.0	22.3 (6)	31.3 (9)	35.2 (10)	2.5 (0)	–	3.4 (0)	3.9 (0)	–	–	3.9
2019 Assembly election	26 May 2019	—N/a	54.5	31.1; 9	25.6; 7	22.4; 6	7.0; 2	6.2; 1	4.5; 0	1.5; 0	–	–	5.5

== Results ==
← Summary of the 28 May 2023 Assembly of Ceuta election results →
Parties and alliances	Popular vote			Seats	
Parties and alliances	Votes	%	±pp	Total	+/−
People's Party (PP)	11,774	34.34	+3.22	9	±0
Spanish Socialist Workers' Party (PSOE)	7,198	21.00	–4.60	6	–1
Vox (Vox)	7,073	20.63	–1.74	5	–1
Movement for Dignity and Citizenship (MDyC)	3,848	11.22	+4.26	3	+1
Ceuta Now! (Ceuta Ya!)^{1}	3,442	10.04	+3.82	2	+1
Citizens–Party of the Citizenry (CS)	239	0.70	–3.84	0	±0
We Can (Podemos)^{2}	192	0.56	–0.93	0	±0
Free (LB)	122	0.36	New	0	±0
Blank ballots	394	1.15	+0.55		
Total	34,282			25	±0
Valid votes	34,282	98.84	–0.30		
Invalid votes	403	1.16	+0.30		
Votes cast / turnout	34,685	54.79	+0.25		
Abstentions	28,616	45.21	–0.25		
Registered voters	63,301				
Sources
Footnotes: ^{1} Ceuta Now! results are compared to Caballas Coalition totals in the 2019 election.; ^{2} We Can results are compared to the totals of United We Can–United Left–Equo in the 2019 election.

Popular vote
PP	34.34%
PSOE	21.00%
Vox	20.63%
MDyC	11.22%
CY!	10.04%
Others	1.61%
Blank ballots	1.15%

Seats
PP	36.00%
PSOE	24.00%
Vox	20.00%
MDyC	12.00%
CY!	8.00%

== Aftermath ==
Investiture
Ballot →	17 June 2023	
Required majority →	13 out of 25 (Note: If no candidate reaches an absolute majority, the candidate from the largest party is elected as Mayor)	
Juan Jesús Vivas (PP): • PP (9)	9 / 25	check
Fatima Hamed (MDyC): • MDyC (3)	3 / 25	X mark
Mohamed Mustafa (Ceuta Ya!): • Ceuta Ya! (2)	2 / 25	X mark
Blank ballots: • PSOE (6); • Vox (5)	11 / 25	
Absentees	0 / 25	
