= Fatima Hamed =

Spanish politician

Member of the Assembly of Ceuta
- Incumbent
- Assumed office 24 May 2015

Personal details
- Born: 1978 (age 47–48) Ceuta, Spain
- Party: Movement for Dignity and Citizenship (since 2014)
- Other political affiliations: Sumar (since 2021), Caballas Coalition (until 2014)
- Education: National University of Distance Education
- Profession: Lawyer

Fatima Hamed Hossain (born 1978) is a Spanish lawyer and politician. She founded the Movement for Dignity and Citizenship (MDyC) in 2014 and has served as a member of the Assembly of Ceuta since 2015, the first Muslim woman to lead a group in the assembly. In 2021, she was one of five founders of Sumar.

== Biography ==
Born in Ceuta, a Spanish exclave in North Africa, Hamed was raised by Moroccan parents in Los Rosales, a neighbourhood with social problems. In 1998, she enrolled with the National University of Distance Education (UNED), where she qualified as a lawyer and later joined the faculty.

In late 2014, Hamed left the Caballas Coalition, and set up the Movement for Dignity and Citizenship (MDyC) ahead of the 2015 Ceuta Assembly election. The party came fourth with 11% of the votes and three seats, making her the first Muslim woman to lead a group in the assembly. In 2019, the party fell to 7% and lost a seat.

In 2021, Hamed received attention during a Spanish–Moroccan border crisis when she criticised the arrival of Vox leader Santiago Abascal in Ceuta and labelled him persona non grata. She was attacked by Carlos Verdejo, the party's spokesman in the Assembly of Ceuta, who called her an advocate of Jihad and Sharia and proposed her deportation to Morocco.

In November 2021, Hamed was one of five left-wing women who set up a new political platform, alongside deputy prime minister Yolanda Díaz, mayor of Barcelona Ada Colau, vice president of the Valencian Community Mónica Oltra and member of the Assembly of Madrid Mónica García.
