= Antonio Sampietro =

Spanish politician

Antonio Sampietro Casarramona (born 30 March 1949 in Barcelona) is a Spanish politician and architect. He was the third Mayor-President of Ceuta (one of Spain's autonomous cities) from 22 August 1999 until 6 February 2001. He was part of Jesús Gil's Liberal Independent Group (GIL) and served in several positions during Gil's mayoralty of Marbella.

== Biography ==
Sampietro was born on 30 March 1949 in Barcelona, Catalonia. He moved to the Basque Country for a while, later moving to Andalusia's Costa del Sol in the late '80s. By the early '90s, he had founded several construction and real estate development companies. He met Jesús Gil and participated in the founding of his party, the right-wing populist Liberal Independent Group (GIL), which achieved a landslide victory in the May 1991 local elections in Marbella. During the first term (1991–1995) of Jesús Gil's mayoralty of Marbella, Sampietro was a member of its council, deputy mayor of San Pedro de Alcántara in the municipality, and councillor for Urban Planning. During the 2013 trial for the Saqueo II case, Sampietro said that he had been removed by Gil for not complying with his requests regarding urban development projects, when they were not accompanied by technical and legal reports. He was acquitted in this Marbella corruption case. He left the city council and moved to Havana, Cuba in 1994, working in the private sector. In 1997, he returned to Spain to serve as GIL's general coordinator until 1999.

In the 1999 Ceuta Assembly election, GIL won 12 out of 25 seats, however an agreement between the People's Party (8 seats), the PDSC (3 seats) and the PSOE (2 seats) allowed the incumbent mayor Jesús Fortes to hold on for two months. Afterwards, Susana Bermúdez defected from the PSOE, and a vote of no confidence installed Sampietro on 22 August 1999. In 2000, a lawsuit alleged bribery for the defection; Sampietro was acquitted in 2006. The PP's Juan Jesús Vivas became mayor on 6 February 2001, when some GIL defectors helped the three opposition parties accomplish this. Afterwards, he was involved with small parties, namely his own Independent Reformist Party of Marbella and San Pedro which failed to win local elections, and the United Barbate Party. In 2008, he published the autobiography Marbella: the beginning and end of Gilism. A Cuban interlude. Ceuta: a round trip. In 2011, the far-right Platform for Catalonia attempted to recruit him.

In 2011, he founded Amigos del Bacalao (Friends of Cod), a group that organizes events with cod dishes.

== See also ==
- Liberal Independent Group
- History of Spain
