= Montserrat Lluis =

Spanish journalist and politician (born 1975)

Montserrat Lluis Serret (born 1975) is a Spanish journalist and politician for Vox. She held positions at Grupo Vocento and Cadena COPE before entering politics in 2022.

== Biography ==
Lluis was born in Tarragona and graduated in information sciences from the University of the Basque Country, where she won the National Graduate Award. She also obtained a master's degree in marketing from the Institute for Digital Development. She was a section leader from 1998 to 2004 for the newspaper El Correo in the Basque Country owned by Grupo Vocento, and was then deputy director of the national newspaper ABC. She moved on to Cadena COPE, where she held directorial positions for the television channels Trece and La 10. She also taught a master's course sponsored by ABC and COPE at Universidad CEU San Pablo.

In April 2022, Lluis entered politics when Vox named her as director general for coordination and social integration in the second government of Alfonso Fernández Mañueco. She resigned in August 2023, when she was named in the national organisation of Vox. She was named vice secretary for government action, a role communicating between the national leadership and regional branches and finding candidates for vacancies, which El Confidencial likened to human resources. She successfully negotiated with the People's Party (PP) for Vox to enter government in Extremadura, Aragon, Castile and León and Andalusia.

Lluis was eighth on Vox's list in the Madrid constituency for the Congress of Deputies in the 2023 Spanish general election, and was not elected. Three years later, she was second on the list, behind party leader Santiago Abascal.
