= Movement for Dignity and Citizenship =

Movement for Dignity and Citizenship Movimiento por la Dignidad y la Ciudadanía
- Leader: Fatima Hamed
- Founded: 27 October 2014
- Split from: Caballas Coalition
- Headquarters: C/Nicaragua Local, 6 - Ceuta
- Ideology: Ceutan autonomism Regionalism; Interculturalism; Progressivism
- Political position: Left-wing
- Assembly of Ceuta: 2 / 25

Website
- www.mdycceuta.com

The Movement for Dignity and Citizenship (Spanish: Movimiento por la Dignidad y la Ciudadanía, MDyC) is a left-wing autonomist party in the Spanish autonomous city of Ceuta.

== History ==
The party was formed in 2014 as a split of the Caballas Coalition, led by Fatima Hamed, the first Muslim woman to lead a political group in the Assembly of Ceuta.

Since 2015, it is a parliamentary force in Ceuta, sitting in the opposition to the People's Party local governments.

In June 2023, MDyC decided not to contest the snap general election celebrated that year. Even though they got offers to participate in lists from both Sumar, and PSOE. The party chose instead to endorse Sumar.

== Electoral results ==
=== Ceuta Assembly ===
Ceuta Assembly
Election	Votes	%	Seats	+/–	Leading candidate	Government
2015	3,265	11.17 (#4)	3 / 25	New	Fatima Hamed	Opposition
2019	2,353	6.96 (#4)	2 / 25	▼1	Fatima Hamed	Opposition
2023	3,839	11.24 (#4)	3 / 25	▲1	Fatima Hamed	Opposition
