= Ceuta Ya! =

Spanish political party in Ceuta

Ceuta Now! Ceuta Ya!
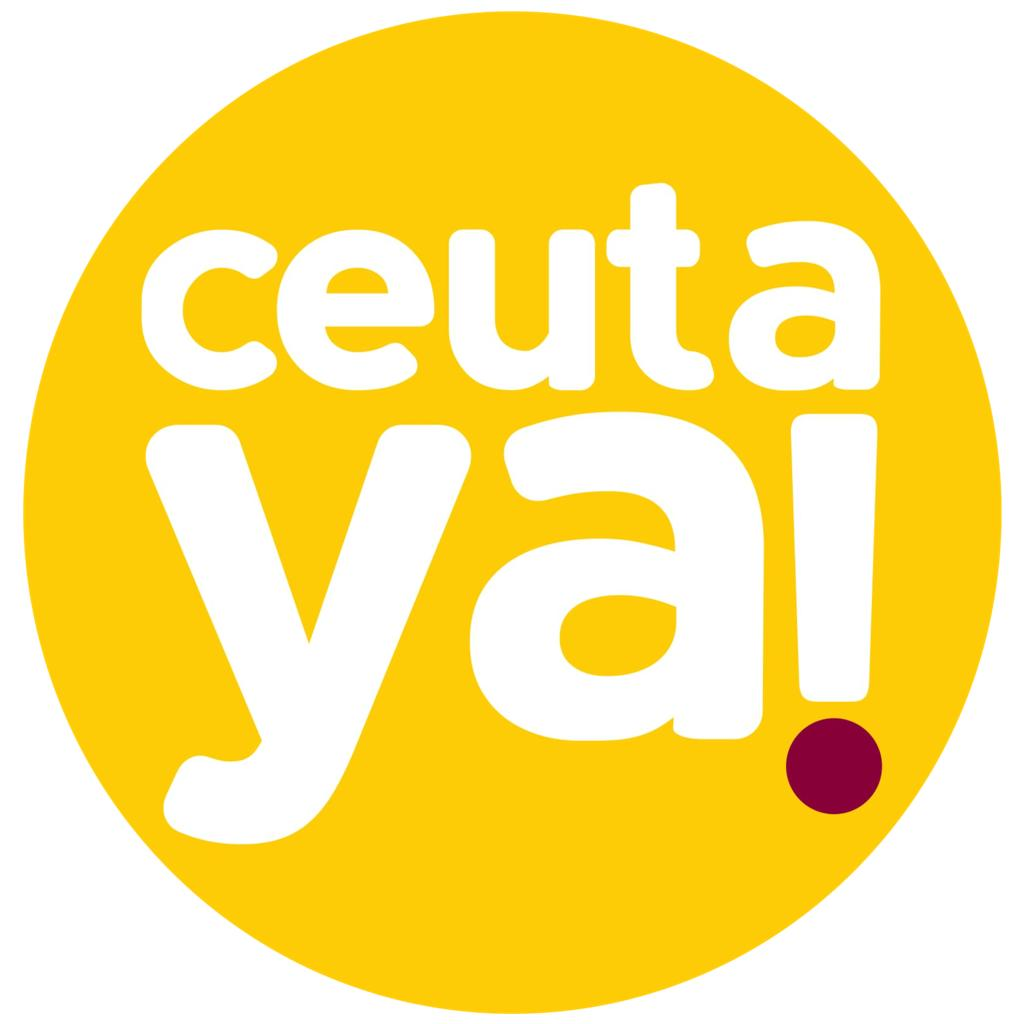
- Leader: Mohamed Mustafa Ahmed
- Founded: 15 October 2021; 4 years ago
- Preceded by: Caballas Coalition
- Ideology: Democratic socialism; Ceutan autonomism; Regionalism; Interculturalism; Progressivism; Muslim interests
- Political position: Left-wing
- Colors: Yellow
- Assembly of Ceuta: 2 / 25

Website
- https://www.ceutaya.es/

Ceuta Ya! (literally "Ceuta Now!") is a Spanish political party in Ceuta. The party is left-wing and localist.

The party was launched on 15 October 2021 by Mohamed Mustafa as a successor to the Caballas Coalition. On 23 November, after the resignation of former Caballas leader Mohamed Alí, Mustafa was sworn in as his replacement in the Assembly of Ceuta.

The party supports the elevation of Ceuta from an autonomous city to a full autonomous community, a policy also held by its predecessor. At its launch, party figures spoke of uniting the people of Ceuta against what they considered to be divisive politics of nationwide parties, particularly Vox.

In the 2023 Ceuta Assembly election, the party rose from 2,105 to 3,428 votes compared to its predecessor, going from one to two seats.

Ceuta Ya! did not contest the 2023 general election, stating this decision was taken to prevent vote dispersion that would have benefitted Vox.
