= Caballas Coalition =

Caballas Coalition Coalición Caballas
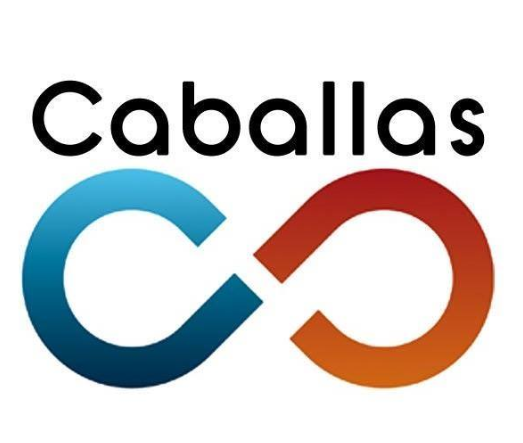
- Leader: Mohamed Alí
- Founded: 2011
- Dissolved: 15 October 2021
- Merger of: PSPC; UDCE
- Succeeded by: Ceuta Ya!
- Ideology: Democratic socialism Ceutan autonomism Regionalism; Interculturalism; Progressivism
- Political position: Left-wing
- National affiliation: Equo
- Colors: Green

Website
- http://www.caballasceuta.com/

The Caballas Coalition (Spanish: Coalición Caballas; i.e., Mackerel Coalition) was a left-wing regionalist party in the Spanish autonomous city of Ceuta in north Africa.

== History ==
The party formed for the 2011 election as a merger between the Ceutan Democratic Union (UDCE) and the Socialist Party of the People of Ceuta (PSPC). The coalition won 4,404 votes (14.34%) in the 2011 elections, earning 4 of the 25 seats in the Ceuta Assembly, making it the second-largest party after the People's Party (PP). The coalition aims for the official recognition of Moroccan Arabic (in the form called Ceuta Arabic) in Ceuta. The coalition, through its two member-parties, was endorsed with the Spanish Socialist Workers' Party (PSOE) until July 2013. The split came from differences of opinion over controversial comments towards women, made by a local Muslim cleric.

On 15 October 2021, the coalition announced its transformation into a platform called Ceuta Ya! (Ceuta Now!).

== Election results ==
=== Ceuta Assembly ===
Ceuta Assembly
Election	Votes	%	Seats	+/–	Leading candidate	Government
2011	4,407	14.32 (#2)	4 / 25	0 (Note: Compared to the combined totals of the Ceutan Democratic Union–United Left of Ceuta and the Socialist Party of the People of Ceuta in the 2007 election.)	Mohamed Alí	Opposition
2015	3,881	13.27 (#3)	4 / 25	0	Mohamed Alí	Opposition
2019	2,105	6.22 (#5)	1 / 25	3	Mohamed Alí	Opposition
