= Mayor-President of Ceuta =

Spanish municipal official

- Flag of Ceuta

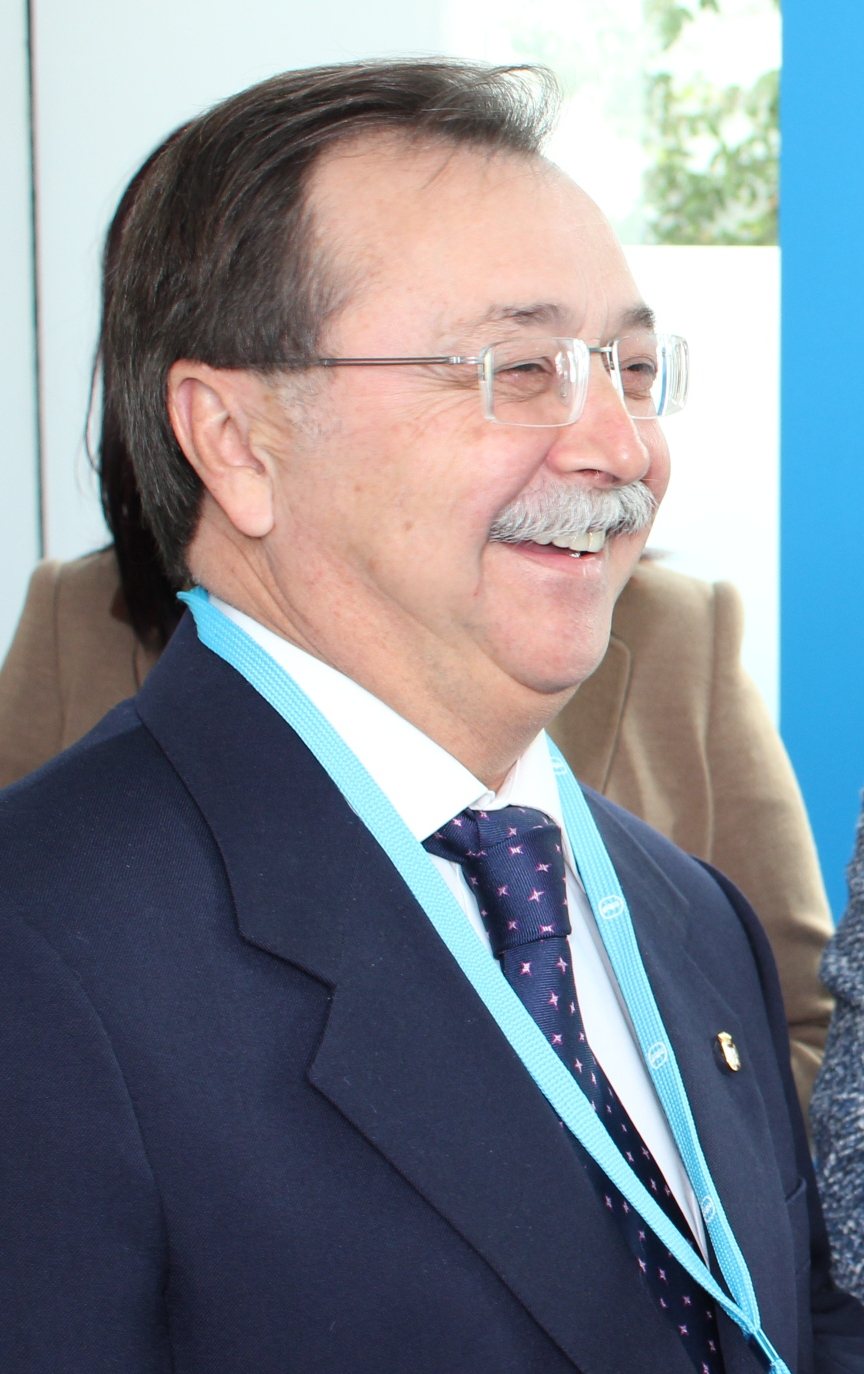
- Incumbent; Juan Jesús Vivas since 8 February 2001
- Style: The Most Excellent
- Nominator: Assembly of Ceuta
- Appointer: The Monarch countersigned by the Prime Minister
- Term length: Four years; no limit.
- Inaugural holder: Basilio Fernández López
- Formation: 19 June 1995

The Mayor-President of the Autonomous City of Ceuta (Spanish: Alcalde-Presidente de la Ciudad Autónoma de Ceuta) or simply the President of Ceuta, is the highest political position of the Autonomous City of Ceuta. Due to the special status of the Spanish autonomous cities, the president is also the mayor of the city, and as such the mayor-president acts as the head of government and as the presiding officer of the Assembly of Ceuta, the legislative branch of the city.

The current and 4th Mayor-President of Ceuta is Juan Jesús Vivas of the People's Party, who has held the office since 8 February 2001. Prior to June 1995, when the enclave's Statute of Autonomy was passed, the city was part of Province of Cádiz, although the position of mayor already existed.

== Duties and powers ==
The mayor-president has the responsibility to lead the government; appoint the government members; represent the city; convene and preside over the sessions of the Plenary; design, develop and execute the powers entrusted to the autonomous cities by the Constitution; dictate regulations; execute the budget; head the civil service and hire, fire or sanction the personnel at its service; head the local police; lead the urban planning; exercise all judicial actions to defend the interests of the city; and adopt all necessary measures in case of catastrophe.

== Election ==
The election system follows the general guidelines of all mayoral elections. The citizens vote for the local assemblies or councils on the basis of universal suffrage, with all nationals over eighteen, registered in the corresponding municipality and in full enjoyment of all political rights entitled to vote. The mayor-president is in turn elected by the plenary Assembly of Ceuta, with a legal clause providing for the candidate of the most-voted party to be automatically elected to the post in the event no other candidate is to gather an absolute majority of votes.

=== Cessation ===
The general cases of cessation are death, incapacitation or resignation.

As in the regional or State governments, the mayor-president can be removed by a vote of no confidence approved by the majority of the local assembly. This motion necessarily needs to proposed an alternative candidate, being a constructive vote of no confidence.

The mayor-president itself can also propose a vote of confidence in order to pass a relevant legislation and if the mayor-president fails to overcome the motion, the mayor must submit his resignation. The mayor-president can't propose more than one vote of confidence per year and this kind of motions can't be proposed on the last year of legislature.

In both processes, the mayor-president can not preside over the session, so it will correspond to one of the Vice Presidents of the Assembly.

== List of mayor-presidents of Ceuta ==
For a list of leaders in the period prior to Ceuta becoming an autonomous community (before 1995), see: List of governors of Ceuta

No.	Name (Birth–Death)	Term of office		Political party
1	Basilio Fernández López	19 June 1995	24 July 1996	Progress and Future of Ceuta
2	Jesús Cayetano Fortes Ramos	24 July 1996	26 August 1999	People's Party
3	Antonio Sampietro (born 1949)	26 August 1999	7 February 2001	Liberal Independent Group
4	Juan Jesús Vivas (born 1953)	7 February 2001	Incumbent	People's Party

== Sources ==
- World Statesmen.org
