= Juan Jesús Vivas =

Spanish politician

The Most Excellent Juan Jesús Vivas
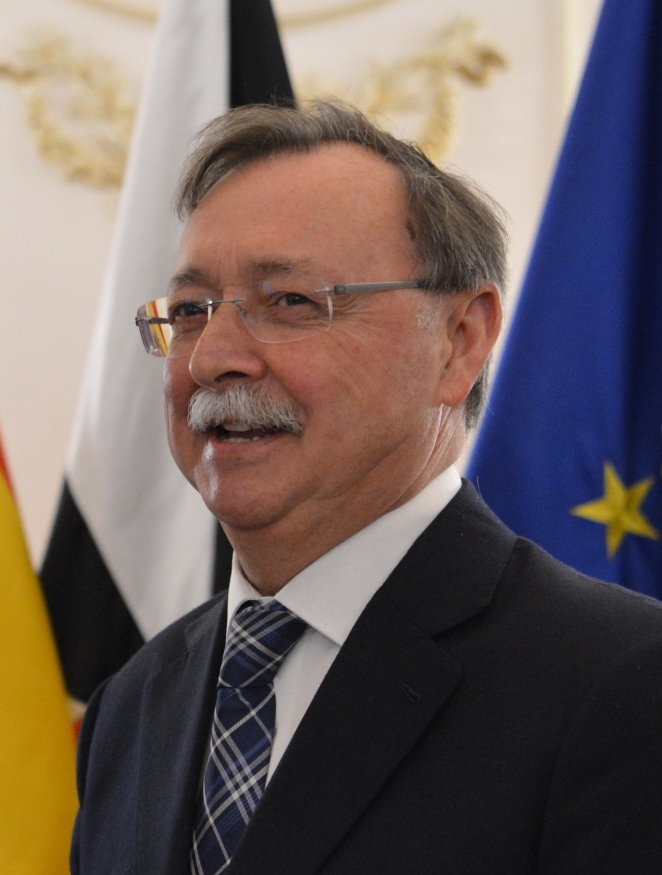
- Vivas in 2019

Mayor-President of Ceuta
- Incumbent
- Assumed office 8 February 2001
- Monarchs: Juan Carlos I (2001–2014); Felipe VI (2014–present)
- Preceded by: Antonio Sampietro

Chairman of the People's Party of Ceuta
- Incumbent
- Assumed office 25 May 2009
- Preceded by: Pedro Gordillo

Member of the Assembly of Ceuta
- Incumbent
- Assumed office 15 June 1999

Personal details
- Born: 27 February 1953 (age 73) Ceuta, Spain
- Party: People's Party of Ceuta
- Education: University of Málaga

Juan Jesús Vivas Lara (born 27 February 1953) is a Spanish politician who is the current Mayor-President of the autonomous city of Ceuta, since 8 February 2001. He is a member of the People's Party (PP).

== Biography ==
Born in Ceuta in 1953, Juan Jesús Vivas earned a degree in Economic Sciences from the University of Málaga. He became a member of the Assembly of Ceuta in 1999 and he was invested as Mayor-President of the autonomous city in 2001, after a successful motion of no-confidence launched against GIL's Mayor-President Antonio Sampietro.

Vivas tested positive for COVID-19 on 10 January 2022.
