= Assembly of Ceuta =

Spanish regional assembly

Assembly of Ceuta Asamblea de Ceuta
- Ceuta unicameral legislature

Type
- Type: Spanish regional legislature
- Houses: Unicameral

Leadership
- Mayor-President: Juan Jesús Vivas, PP since 8 February 2001

Structure
- Seats: 25
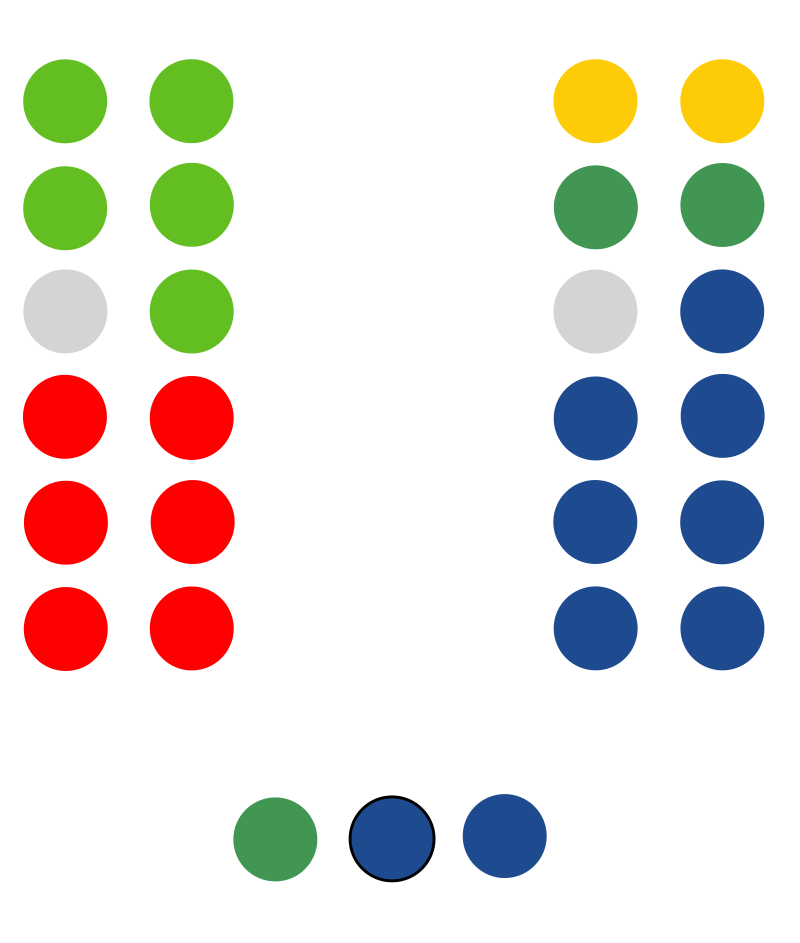
- Political groups: Government (9): PP (9); Opposition (16): PSOE (6); Vox (5); MDyC (3); CY! (2)
- Length of term: 4 years

Elections
- Last election: 2023
- Next election: 2027

Meeting place
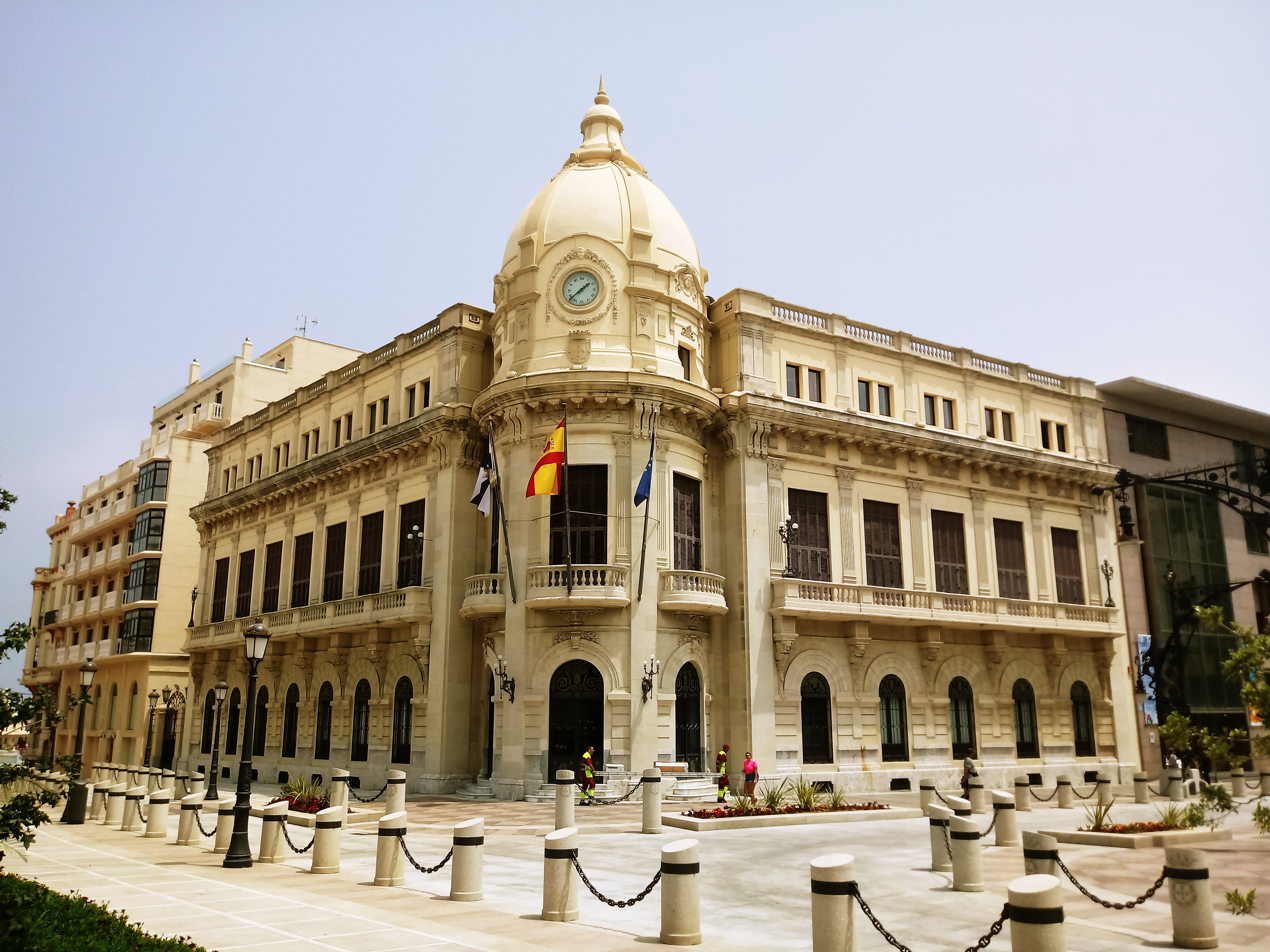
- Palace of the Assembly, Ceuta

Website
- https://www.ceuta.es/gobiernodeceuta/index.php/el-gobierno/la-asamblea

The Assembly of Ceuta (Spanish: Asamblea de Ceuta) is the regional legislature of the autonomous city of Ceuta, an exclave of Spain located on the north coast of Africa.

The Assembly has 25 members, elected by universal suffrage. Following an election, the members of the Assembly select a Mayor-President to serve as the head of government for the city.
